= Violin Sonata in D major =

Violin Sonata in D major may refer to:

- Violin sonata in D major (HWV 371) (Handel)
- Violin Sonata No. 23 (Mozart)
- Violin Sonata in D major (attributed to Mozart)
- Violin Sonata No. 1 (Beethoven)
- No. 1 of the Violin Sonatas, Op. 137 (Schubert)
- Violin Sonata No. 1 (Stanford)
- Violin Sonata No. 2 (Prokofiev)
- Violin Sonata No. 2 (Hindemith)
