= K251 =

K251 or K-251 may refer to:

- K-251 (Kansas highway), a state highway in Kansas
- K251BS, a radio station
- K251AU, a radio station
- K.251 Divertimento No. 11 (Mozart) in D major (1776)
