= Köchel catalogue =

Chronological catalogue of compositions by Wolfgang Amadeus Mozart

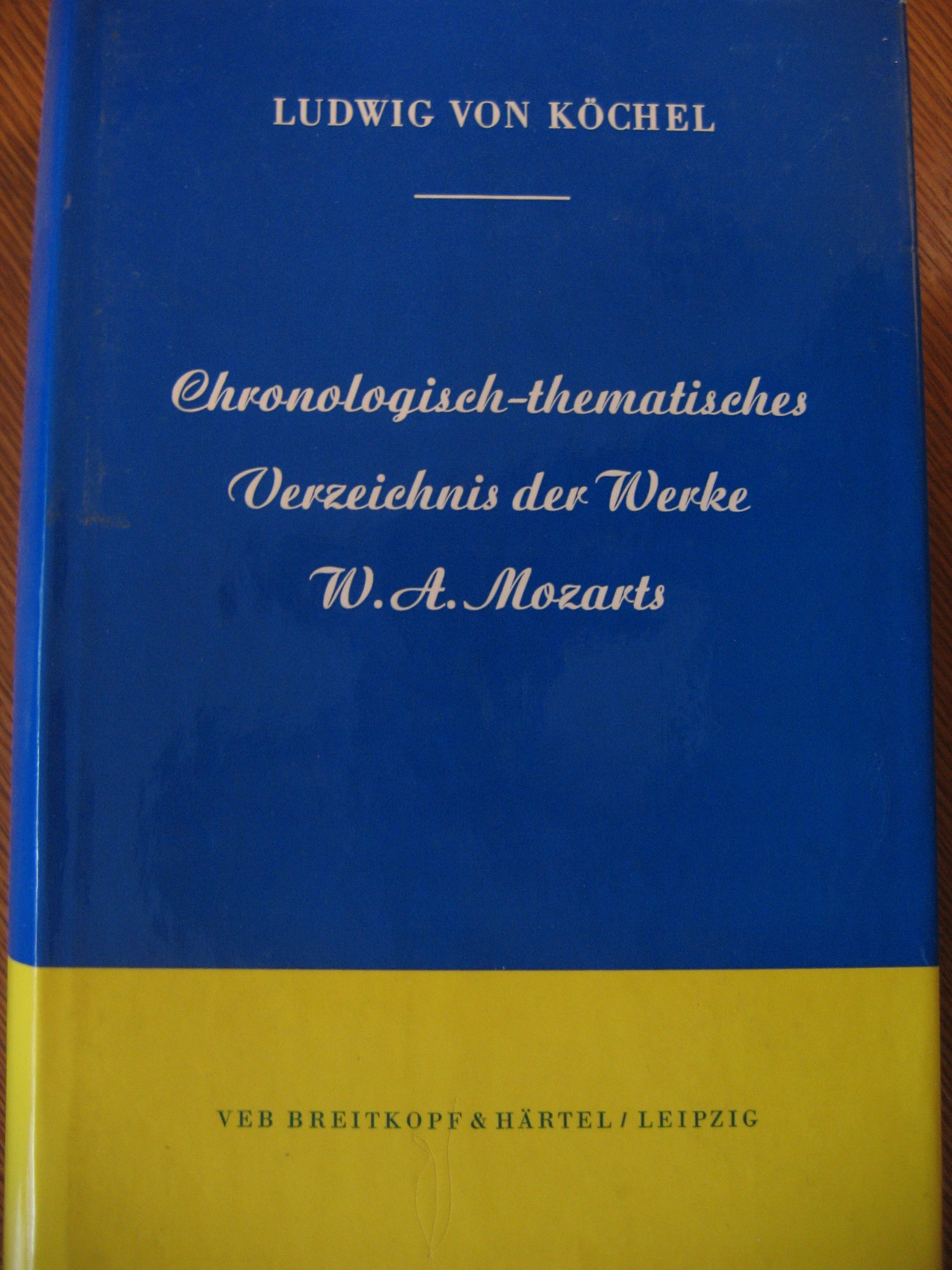
Köchel-Verzeichnis, published 1975 in East Germany

The Köchel catalogue (German: Köchel-Verzeichnis) is a catalogue of compositions by Wolfgang Amadeus Mozart, originally created by Ludwig Ritter von Köchel, in which the entries are abbreviated K. or KV. Its numbers reflect the ongoing task of compiling the chronology of Mozart's works, and provide a shorthand reference to the compositions. For example, according to Köchel's counting, Requiem in D minor is the 626th piece Mozart composed, thus is designated K. 626.

Köchel's original catalogue (1862) has been revised several times. Catalogue numbers from these revised editions are indicated either by parentheses or by superscript: K. 49 (47d) or K.^{6} 47d refers to the work numbered 47d in the sixth edition. The catalog was originally chronological, though revisions made chronological ordering of Mozart's works difficult and as of 2024 a new organizational system is used for the ninth version.

== History ==
In the decades after Mozart's death in 1791 there were several attempts to catalogue his compositions, for example by Franz Gleißner and Johann Anton André (published in 1833), but it was not until 1862 that Ludwig von Köchel succeeded in producing a comprehensive listing. Köchel's 551-page catalogue was titled Chronologisch-thematisches Verzeichniss sämmtlicher Tonwerke W. A. Mozart's (Chronological-thematic Catalogue of the Complete Musical Works of W. A. Mozart). Köchel attempted to arrange the works in chronological order, but many compositions written before 1784 could only be estimated, although Leopold Mozart had compiled a partial list of his son's earlier works; Mozart's catalogue of his own compositions (begun in February 1784 with K. 449) allows relatively precise dating of many of his later works. The catalogue included the opening bars of each piece, known as an incipit. Köchel divided the corpus into a main chronology of 626 works, and five appendices (Anhänge in German), abbreviated Anh. I–V which comprise:

1. Lost authentic works
2. Fragments by Mozart
3. Works by Mozart transcribed by others
4. Doubtful works
5. Misattributed works

From the time Köchel published his original catalogue in 1863 (now referred to as K^{1}), the dating of Mozart's compositions has been subject to constant revision. Many more pieces have since been discovered, re-dated, or re-attributed, necessitating multiple revised editions of the catalogue. Subsequent editions – especially the third edition (K^{3}) by Alfred Einstein (1937), and the sixth edition (K^{6}) by Franz Giegling, Gerd Sievers, and Alexander Weinmann (1964) – have reflected attempts to arrange the growing list of works in a more accurate chronological order, according to updated scholarship.

However, a major shortcoming of K^{1} was that there was no room to expand the strictly contiguous numbering in the main catalogue to allow for new discoveries or further reassessment of existing works. Simply creating a new sequential numbering according to the new chronology would shift most pieces to new numbers, causing confusion. For the 1937 edition (K^{3}) Einstein (following the analyses of Théodore de Wyzewa and Georges de St. Foix) reassigned some works from the original K^{1} appendices into the main catalogue by interpolating numbers with a lower-case letter suffix. In K^{6} some of these were, per intervening scholarship, returned to re-structured appendices:

- K. 626a
  - K. 626a I – 64 Cadenzas by Mozart to his own keyboard concertos
  - K. 626a II – Cadenzas by Mozart to keyboard concertos by other composers
- K. 626b – 42 sketches & other fragments by Mozart (replacing K^{3} Anh. II)
- Anh. A – Copies by Mozart of other composers' works
- Anh. B – Works by Mozart transcribed by others
- Anh. C – Doubtful and misattributed vocal (C 1–10) and instrumental (C 11-30) works

In response to the confusing renumbering between versions, and resistance by users to any further changes, the ninth edition (K^{9}) by Neal Zaslaw (2024) explicitly abandoned the goal of chronological ordering. Instead, to be more consistent with past usage, almost all works in the main catalogue that had been included in a previous edition of the main catalogue returned to the oldest number they had been given. Works newly included in the ninth edition's main catalogue were given numbers past 626, up to 721.

For example, Divertimento for Wind Octet in E♭ was renumbered multiple times:

- It was numbered K. Anh. 226 in K^{1};
- Einstein placed it in the K^{3} main catalogue as K. 196e, between K. 196 and K. 197;
- K^{6} reassigned it to the 'doubtful' appendix C as K. Anh. C 17.01;
- K^{9} reverted to Einstein's number K. 196e (though it is still considered a doubtful work).

Some works in Anh. A have been identified since 1965 as by Leopold Mozart. Many works in Anh. C have since been more reliably assigned to other composers, or to Mozart himself.

Editions of Köchel's catalogue
Edition	Year	Editors	Note
1	1862	Ludwig von Köchel	Original
2	1905	Paul von Waldersee	Limited revision: mostly addition of pieces that had since come to light
3	1937	Alfred Einstein	
4	1958	Alfred Einstein	Unchanged reprint
5	1961	Alfred Einstein	Unchanged reprint
6	1964	Franz Giegling; Gerd Sievers; Alexander Weinmann	
7	1965	Franz Giegling; Gerd Sievers; Alexander Weinmann	Unchanged reprint
8	1983	Franz Giegling; Gerd Sievers; Alexander Weinmann	Unchanged reprint
9	2024	Neal Zaslaw	Chronological ordering abandoned; works no longer renumbered

== List of existing Mozart compositions ==
To maintain as much of the original K-numbering of the list as possible, while re-ordering in the revised, chronological sequence, letters were added to the new numbers. The following list shows the latest edition (K^{9}), Köchel's original designation (K^{1}), and the sixth edition (K^{6}). Other addenda and supplements to the catalogue are marked Anhang. (This has been abbreviated to 'Anh.' in the list below.)

List of Mozart compositions
K^{9}	K^{1}	K^{6}	Composition	Date	Age	Location
1a		1a	Andante in C for Piano	early 1761	5	Salzburg
1b		1b	Allegro in C for Piano	early 1761	5	Salzburg
1c		1c	Allegro in F for Piano	11 December 1761	5	Salzburg
1d		1d	Minuet in F for Piano	16 December 1761	5	Salzburg
1,01	1	1e	Minuet in G for Piano	December 1761 – January 1762	5–6	Salzburg
1,02	1	1f	Minuet in C for Piano	December 1761 – January 1762	5–6	Salzburg
2	2	2	Minuet in F for Piano	January 1762	6	Salzburg
3	3	3	Allegro in B♭ for Piano	4 March 1762	6	Salzburg
4	4	4	Minuet in F for Piano	11 May 1762	6	Salzburg
5	5	5	Minuet in F for Piano	5 July 1762	6	Salzburg
9a	9a	5a	Allegro in C for Piano	1764	8	Salzburg
9b	9b	5b	Andante in B♭ for Piano	1764	8	Salzburg
6	6	6	Violin Sonata No. 1 in C	1762–64	6–8	Salzburg or Paris
7	7	7	Violin Sonata No. 2 in D	1762–64	6–8	Salzburg or Paris
8	8	8	Violin Sonata No. 3 in B♭	January 1764	7–8	Paris
9	9	9	Violin Sonata No. 4 in G	January 1764	7–8	Paris
10	10	10	Violin Sonata No. 5 in B♭	1764	8	London
11	11	11	Violin Sonata No. 6 in G	1764	8	London
12	12	12	Violin Sonata No. 7 in A	1764	8	London
13	13	13	Violin Sonata No. 8 in F	1764	8	London
14	14	14	Violin Sonata No. 9 in C	1764	8	London
15	15	15	Violin Sonata No. 10 in B♭	1764	8	London
15a – 15ss	Anh. 109b	15a – 15ss	The London Sketchbook, 43 untitled pieces	1765	9	London
16	16	16	Symphony No. 1 in E♭	August/September 1764	8	London
Anh.C 11.18	Anh. 220	16a	Symphony in A minor, Odense (spurious)			
19	19	19	Symphony No. 4 in D	1765	9	London
19a	Anh. 223	19a	Symphony in F	early 1765	9	London
19b	Anh. 222	19b	Symphony in C (fragment)	13 May 1765	9	London
21	21	19c	Aria for Tenor, "Va, dal furor portata"	1765	9	London
19d		19d	Piano Sonata in C for Four-Hands (doubtful)	13 May 1765	9	London
20	20	20	Motet in G minor, "God is our refuge"	July 1765	9	London
21a	Anh. 206	21a	Variations in A (lost)	July 1765	9	London
22	22	22	Symphony No. 5 in B♭	December 1765	9	The Hague
23	23	23	Aria for soprano and orchestra "Conservati fedele"	October 1765 and January 1766	9–10	The Hague
24	24	24	8 Variations in G on "Laat ons juichen, Batavieren!"	7 March 1766	10	The Hague
25	25	25	7 Variations in D on "Willem van Nassau"	7 March 1766	10	Amsterdam
26	26	26	Violin Sonata No. 11 in E♭	February 1766	10	The Hague
27	27	27	Violin Sonata No. 12 in G	February 1766	10	The Hague
28	28	28	Violin Sonata No. 13 in C	February 1766	10	The Hague
29	29	29	Violin Sonata No. 14 in D	February 1766	10	The Hague
30	30	30	Violin Sonata No. 15 in F	February 1766	10	The Hague
31	31	31	Violin Sonata No. 16 in B♭	February 1766	10	The Hague
32	32	32	Gallimathias musicum (quodlibet)	early March 1766	10	The Hague
32a		32a	The Third Sketchbook (lost)	Winter 1765–66	9–10	Netherlands
33	33	33	Kyrie in F	12 June 1766	10	Paris
33a		33a	Solos for Flute (lost)	1766	10	Lausanne
Anh.A 6		33B	"Klavierstück" in F	early October 1766	10	Zurich
33b		33b	Solos for Cello (lost)	1766	10	Donaueschingen
33c		33c	"Stabat mater" for 4 voices in G (lost)	1766	10	Paris or Salzburg
33d	Anh. 199	33d	Piano Sonata in G (lost)	1766	10	Salzburg
33e	Anh. 200	33e	Piano Sonata in B♭ (lost)	1766	10	Salzburg
33f	Anh. 201	33f	Piano Sonata in C (lost)	1766	10	Salzburg
33g	Anh. 202	33g	Piano Sonata in F (lost; doubtful)	1766	10	Salzburg
33h		33h	Waldhornstück (lost)	1766	10	Salzburg
36	36	33i	Recitative and aria for tenor and orchestra, "Or che il dover – Tali e cotanti sono"	December 1766	10	Salzburg
34	34	34	Offertory in C, "Scande coeli limina"	early 1767	10–11	Bavaria
35	35	35	Die Schuldigkeit des ersten Gebots	1767	11	Salzburg
42	42	35a	Grabmusik	Holy Week 1767	11	Salzburg
Anh.A 7	37	37	Piano Concerto No. 1 in F	April 1767	11	Salzburg
38	38	38	Apollo et Hyacinthus	13 May 1767	11	Salzburg
Anh.A 8	39	39	Piano Concerto No. 2 in B♭	June 1767	11	Salzburg
Anh.A 9	40	40	Piano Concerto No. 3 in D	July 1767	11	Salzburg
Anh.A 16	41	41	Piano Concerto No. 4 in G	July 1767	11	Salzburg
41a		41a	6 Divertimento (lost)	1767	11	Salzburg
41b		41b	"Bläserstücke verschiedener Besetzung" (lost)	1767	11	Salzburg
41c		41c	Various Marches (lost)	1767	11	Salzburg
41d		41d	Various Minuets (lost)	1767	11	Salzburg
41e		41e	Fugue (lost)	1767	11	Salzburg
41f		41f	Four-part Fugue (lost)	1767	11	Salzburg
41g		41g	Serenade for 2 Violins, Cello, and Organ (lost)	1767	11	Salzburg
67	67	41h	Church Sonata No. 1 in E♭	1772?	16?	Salzburg
68	68	41i	Church Sonata No. 2 in B♭	1772?	16?	Salzburg
69	69	41k	Church Sonata No. 3 in D	1772?	16?	Salzburg
76	76	42a	Symphony No. 43 in F (doubtful)	1767	11	Vienna
43	43	43	Symphony No. 6 in F	late 1767	11	Olomouc and Vienna
43a		43a	Duet for two sopranos, "Ach, was müßen wir erfahren?" (fragment)	October 1767	11	Vienna
45	45	45	Symphony No. 7 in D	16 January 1768	11	Vienna
45a	Anh. 221	45a	Symphony in G, "Alte Lambach"	1766 and 1767	10–11	The Hague
45b	Anh. 214	45b	Symphony No. 55 in B♭ (doubtful)	early 1768	12	Vienna
51	51	46a	La finta semplice	First half 1768	12	Vienna
50	50	46b	Bastien und Bastienne	September – October 1768	12	Vienna
52	52	46c	"Daphne, deine Rosenwangen"	Summer 1768	12	Vienna
46d		46d	Violin Sonata in C	1 September 1768	12	Vienna
46e		46e	Violin Sonata in F	1 September 1768	12	Vienna
47	47	47	Veni Sancte Spiritus in C	Autumn 1768	12	Vienna
139	139	47a	Missa solemnis in C minor, "Waisenhaus"	1768 – mid-1769	12–13	Vienna
47b		47b	Offertorium in C, "Benedictus sit Deus" (lost)	October/November 1768	12	Vienna
47c		47c	Trumpet Concerto (lost)	Autumn 1768	12	Vienna
49	49	47d	Missa brevis in G	October – November 1768	12	Vienna
53	53	47e	Song, "An die Freude"	November 1768	12	Vienna
48	48	48	Symphony No. 8 in D	13 December 1768	12	Vienna
65	65	61a	Missa brevis in D minor	14 January 1769	12	Salzburg
65a		61b	7 Minuets	26 January 1769	12	Salzburg
70	70	61c	Recitative and Aria for Soprano, "A Berenice"	28 February 1767 and 1769	11–13	Salzburg
103	103	61d	20 Minuets (I. Zwölf Menuette in der Ordnung letzter Hand; II. Acht Menuette aus der ursprünglichen Reihe)	1771–72	13	Salzburg
Anh.A 28	104	61e	6 Minuets (actually by Michael Haydn)			
Anh.C 13.05	105	61f	6 Minuets (actually by Michael Haydn)			
61g,01		61g	2 Minuets (the second one is now K^{9} Anh.A 25, because it is actually by Michael Haydn)	1769	13	Salzburg
61h		61h	6 Minuets	1769	13	Salzburg
62	62	62	March in D	Summer 1769	13	Salzburg
100	100	62a	Cassation in D (Serenade No. 1)	Summer 1769	13	Salzburg
63	63	63	Cassation in G	Summer 1769	13	Salzburg
99	99	63a	Cassation in B♭	Summer 1769	13	Salzburg
Anh.C 13.04	64	64	Minuet in D (actually by Leopold Mozart)			
66	66	66	Missa in C, "Dominicus"	October 1769	13	Salzburg
117	117	66a	Offertory (pro omni tempore) in C	September or October 1769	13	Salzburg
141	141	66b	Te Deum in C	End of 1769	13	Salzburg
66c	Anh. 215	66c	Symphony in D (lost)	1769?	13?	Salzburg?
66d	Anh. 217	66d	Symphony in B♭ (lost)	1769?	13?	Salzburg?
66e	Anh. 218	66e	Symphony in B♭ (lost)	1769?	13?	Salzburg?
71	71	71	Aria for Tenor "Ah più tremar non voglio" in F (fragment)	1769 or early 1770	13–14	Salzburg
72a	72a	72a	Molto Allegro in G (fragment)	6 January 1770	14	Verona
72b	Anh. 2	72b	Aria "Misero tu non sei"	26 January 1770	13	Salzburg
73	73 (K^{3} 75a)	73	Symphony No. 9 in C	1769 or Spring 1770	13–14	Salzburg
143	143	73a	Motet for Soprano in G, "Ergo interest" (doubtful)	early February 1773	17	Salzburg
78	78	73b	Aria for Soprano, "Per pietà, bell'idol mio"	1766	10	Milan
88	88	73c	Aria for Soprano, "Fra cento affanni"	February – March 1770	14	Milan
79	79	73d	Recitative and Aria for Soprano, "O temerario Arbace"	1766	10	Milan
73D		73D	Aria for Soprano, "Per quel paterno amplesso"	1766	10	Milan
77	77	73e	Recitative and Aria for Soprano, "Misero me...Misero pargoletto"	March 1770	14	Milan
80	80	73f	String Quartet No. 1 in G	15 March 1770	14	Lodi
123	123	73g	Contredanse in B♭	13–14 April 1770	14	Rome
Anh.H 24,17	94	73h	Minuet in D (doubtful)	1769/1770	13–14	Bologna or Rome
Anh.H 10,05		73i	Canon in A for 4 or 5 voices in 1	1772	16	
89	89	73k	Kyrie in G for 5 voices in 1	1772	16	Rome
81	81	73l	Symphony No. 44 in D (doubtful)	April 1770	14	Rome
97	97	73m	Symphony No. 47 in D (doubtful)	April 1770	14	Rome
95	95	73n	Symphony No. 45 in D (doubtful)	April 1770	14	Rome
82	82	73o	Aria for Soprano, "Se ardire, e speranza"	25 April 1770	14	Rome
83	83	73p	Aria for Soprano, "Se tutti i mali miei"	April – May 1770	14	Rome
84	84	73q	Symphony No. 11 in D (uncertain)	1770	14	Milan or Bologna
Anh.H 9,11, 9,14	89a	73r	4 Riddle Canons	Summer 1772	16	Bologna
85	85	73s	Miserere in A minor	July – August 1770	14	Bologna
Anh.A 34	122	73t	Minuet in E♭	early August 1770	14	Bologna
Anh.A 20, 21	44	73u	"Cibavit eos" (transcription of music by Johann Stadlmayr)	early August 1770	14	Bologna
Anh.H 24,16	86	73v	Antiphon in D minor, "Quaerite primum regnum Dei"	9 October 1770	14	Bologna
Anh.H 13,01		73w	Fugue in D for Piano	9 October 1770	14	Bologna
Anh.H, various	Anh. 109d	73x	14 Canonic Studies (No. 3 is K. 720; the others are in Anh.H of K^{9})	1772	16	
74	74	74	Symphony No. 10 in G	Spring 1770	14	Milan
87	87	74a	Mitridate, re di Ponto	26 December 1770	14	Bologna and Milan
74b		74b	Aria for Soprano, "Non curo l'affetto"	early 1771	14–15	Milan or Pavia
118	118	74c	Betulia liberata	March – July 1771	15	Italy and Salzburg
108	108	74d	Regina Coeli in C	May 1771	15	Salzburg
109	109	74e	Litaniae Lauretanae B.M.V. in B♭	May 1771	15	Salzburg
72	72	74f	Offertory in G, "Inter natos mulierum"	May or June 1771	15	Salzburg
75	75	75	Symphony No. 42 in F (doubtful)	Spring 1771	15	Salzburg
110	110	75b	Symphony No. 12 in G	July 1771	15	Salzburg
90	90	90	Kyrie in D minor (doubtful)	1771–1772	15–16	Salzburg
Anh.A 29	107;21b	107	3 Concerti for Piano after J.C. Bach	Winter 1770–1772	14–16	Salzburg
111	111	111	Ascanio in Alba	17 October 1771	15	Milan
111	120	111a	Finale of Symphony No. 48 in D (Ascanio in Alba)	August 1771	15	Milan
96	96	111b	Symphony No. 46 in C (doubtful)	October/November 1771	15	Milan
112	112	112	Symphony No. 13 in F	2 November 1771	15	Milan
113	113	113	Divertimento No. 1 in E♭	November 1771	15	Milan
114	114	114	Symphony No. 14 in A	30 December 1771	15	Salzburg
381	381	123a	Sonata in D for Piano Four-Hands	early 1772	16	Salzburg
124	124	124	Symphony No. 15 in G	21 February 1772	16	Salzburg
Anh.C 16.02		124A	Church Sonata in D (actually by Leopold Mozart)	1774	18	Salzburg
144	144	124a	Church Sonata No. 4 in D	1774	18	Salzburg
145	145	124b	Church Sonata No. 5 in F	1774	18	Salzburg
125	125	125	Litaniae de venerabili altaris sacramento in B♭	March 1772	16	Salzburg
136	136	125a	Divertimento in D "Salzburg Symphony No. 1"	early 1772	15–16	Salzburg
137	137	125b	Divertimento in B♭, "Salzburg Symphony No. 2"	early 1772	15–16	Salzburg
138	138	125c	Divertimento in F, "Salzburg Symphony No. 3"	early 1772	15–16	Salzburg
147	147	125g	Song, "Wie unglücklich bin ich nit"	1772	16	Salzburg
148	148	125h	Song, "Lobegesang auf die feierliche Johannisloge"	1772	16	Salzburg
126	126	126	Il sogno di Scipione	May 1772	16	Salzburg
127	127	127	Regina coeli in B♭	May 1772	16	Salzburg
128	128	128	Symphony No. 16 in C	May 1772	16	Salzburg
129	129	129	Symphony No. 17 in G	May 1772	16	Salzburg
130	130	130	Symphony No. 18 in F	May 1772	16	Salzburg
164	164	130a	6 Minuets	June 1772	16	Salzburg
131	131	131	Divertimento No. 2 in D	June 1772	16	Salzburg
132	132	132	Symphony No. 19 in E♭	July 1772	16	Salzburg
133	133	133	Symphony No. 20 in D	July 1772	16	Salzburg
134	134	134	Symphony No. 21 in A	August 1772	16	Salzburg
155	155	134a	String Quartet No. 2 in D	October – November 1772	16	Bozen and Verona
156	156	134b	String Quartet No. 3 in G	End of 1772	16	Milan
135	135	135	Lucio Silla	26 December 1772	16	Salzburg and Milan
Anh.A 35	Anh. 109	135a	Sketch of a Ballet "Le gelosie del Seraglio" (one trio is K. 665; the rest is K^{9} Anh.A 35 as an arrangement of work by Josef Starzer and François Granier)	December 1772	16	Salzburg and Milan
126	161/163	141a	Symphony No. 50 in D	March 1772 – late 1772	16	Salzburg
157	157	157	String Quartet No. 4 in C	End of 1772 – early 1773	16–17	Milan
158	158	158	String Quartet No. 5 in F	End of 1772 – early 1773	16–17	Milan
165	165	158a	Motet in F for Soprano, "Exsultate, jubilate"	January 1773	16–17	Milan
159	159	159	String Quartet No. 6 in B♭	early 1773	16–17	Milan
160	160	159a	String Quartet No. 7 in E♭	early 1773	16–17	Milan
186	186	159b	Divertimento No. 4 in B♭	March 1773	17	Milan or Salzburg
166	166	159d	Divertimento No. 3 in E♭	24 March 1773	17	Salzburg
184	184	161a	Symphony No. 26 in E♭	30 March 1773	17	Salzburg
199	199	161b	Symphony No. 27 in G	10? April 1773	17	Salzburg
162	162	162	Symphony No. 22 in C	19 April 1773	17	Salzburg
181	181	162b	Symphony No. 23 in D	19 May 1773	17	Salzburg
Anh.H 10,01	223	166e	Hosanna in G	Summer 1773	17	Salzburg
166f	Anh. 18	166f	Kyrie in C (fragment)	1772	16	Salzburg
166g	Anh. 19	166g	Kyrie in D (fragment)	1772	16	Salzburg
Anh.A 37	Anh. 23	166h	In te Domine in C (fragment)	1772	16	Salzburg
167	167	167	Missa in C, "Trinitatis"	June 1773	17	Salzburg
205	205	167A	Divertimento No. 7 in D	July 1773	17	Vienna
290	290	167AB	March in D (opening to K. 167A)	July 1773	17	Vienna
185	185	167a	Serenade No. 3 in D, "Antretter"	July and August 1773	17	Vienna
189	189	167b	March in D	July and August 1773	17	Vienna
168	168	168	String Quartet No. 8 in F	August 1773	17	Vienna
168a		168a	Minuet for a String Quartet in F	August 1773	17	Vienna
169	169	169	String Quartet No. 9 in A	August 1773	17	Vienna
170	170	170	String Quartet No. 10 in C	August 1773	17	Vienna
171	171	171	String Quartet No. 11 in E♭	August 1773	17	Vienna
172	172	172	String Quartet No. 12 in B♭	September 1773	17	Vienna
173	173	173	String Quartet No. 13 in D minor	September 1773	17	Vienna
180	180	173c	6 Variations in G on "Mio caro Adone" from La fiera di Venezia by Antonio Salieri	Autumn 1773	17	Vienna
345		173d	2 Choruses/5 Entr'actes for "Thamos, König in Ägypten"	3 October 1773	17	Salzburg
182	182	173dA	Symphony No. 24 in B♭	3 October 1773	17	Salzburg
183	183	173dB	Symphony No. 25 in G minor, "Little G minor Symphony"	5 October 1773	17	Salzburg
174	174	174	String Quintet No. 1 in B♭	December 1773	17	Salzburg
175	175	175	Piano Concerto No. 5 in D	December 1773	17	Salzburg
176	176	176	16 Minuets	December 1773	17	Salzburg
201	201	186a	Symphony No. 29 in A	6 April 1774	18	Salzburg
202	202	186b	Symphony No. 30 in D	5 May 1774	18	Salzburg
358	358	186c	Sonata in B♭ for Piano Four-Hands	Spring 1774	18	Salzburg
195	195	186d	Litaniae Lauretanae BMV in D	May 1774	18	Salzburg
190	190	186E	Concertone for two Violins and Orchestra in C	31 May 1774	18	Salzburg
191	191	186e	Bassoon Concerto in B♭	4 June 1774	18	Salzburg
192	192	186f	Missa Brevis in F	24 June 1774	18	Salzburg
193	193	186g	Dixit Dominus, Magnificat in C	July 1774	18	Salzburg
194	194	186h	Missa brevis in D	8 August 1774	18	Salzburg
179	179	189a	12 Variations in C on a Minuet by Fischer	6 December 1774	18	Salzburg
203	203	189b	Serenade No. 4 in D, "Colloredo"	Summer 1774	18	Salzburg
237	237	189c	March in D	Summer 1774	18	Salzburg
279	279	189d	Piano Sonata No. 1 in C	early 1775	19	Munich
280	280	189e	Piano Sonata No. 2 in F	early 1775	18–19	Munich
281	281	189f	Piano Sonata No. 3 in B♭	early 1775	18–19	Munich
282	282	189g	Piano Sonata No. 4 in E♭	early 1775	18–19	Munich
283	283	189h	Piano Sonata No. 5 in G	early 1775	18–19	Munich
200	200	189k	Symphony No. 28 in C	17? November 1773 or 1774	17–18	Salzburg
196	196	196	La finta giardiniera	13 January 1775	18	Salzburg
196a	Anh. 16	196a	Kyrie in G (fragment)	1787–1789	31–33	Munich
220	220	196b	Missa brevis in C, "Spatzen"	1775 or 1776	19–20	Munich
292	292	196c	Duo in B♭ for Bassoon and Cello	early 1775	18–19	Munich
196e	Anh. 226	Anh. C 17.01	Divertimento in E♭ for winds (doubtful)			
196f	Anh. 227	Anh. C 17.02	Divertimento in B♭ for winds (doubtful)			
222	222	205a	Offertory in D minor, "Misericordias Domini"	January or February 1775	18–19	Munich
284	284	205b	Piano Sonata No. 6 in D, "Dürnitz"	early 1775	18–19	Munich
206a		206a	Cello Concerto in F (lost)	March 1775	18–19	Munich
207	207	207	Violin Concerto No. 1 in B♭	Spring 1773	17	Salzburg
196	121	207a	Finale of Symphony No. 51 in D (La finta giardiniera)	End of 1774 – early 1775	18–19	Salzburg
208	208	208	Il re pastore	23 April 1775	19	Salzburg
209	209	209	Aria for Tenor, "Si mostra la sorte"	19 May 1775	19	Salzburg
209a		209a	Aria for Bass, "Un dente guasto e gelato" in D (fragment)	1775	19	Salzburg
210	210	210	Aria for Tenor, "Con ossequio, con rispetto"	May 1775	19	Salzburg
211	211	211	Violin Concerto No. 2 in D	14 June 1775	19	Salzburg
212	212	212	Church Sonata No. 6 in B♭	July 1775	19	Salzburg
213	213	213	Divertimento No. 8 in F	July 1775	19	Salzburg
204	204	213a	Serenade No. 5 in D	5 August 1775	19	Salzburg
215	215	213b	March in D	August 1775	19	Salzburg
208	102	213c	Finale of a Symphony No. 52 in C (Il re pastore)	23 April 1775 – end of 1775	19	Salzburg
214	214	214	March in C, "Il re pastore"	20 August 1775	19	Salzburg
216	216	216	Violin Concerto No. 3 in G, "Straßburg"	12 September 1775	19	Salzburg
217	217	217	Aria for Soprano, "Voi avete un cor fedele"	26 October 1775	19	Salzburg
218	218	218	Violin Concerto No. 4 in D	October 1775	19	Salzburg
219	219	219	Violin Concerto No. 5 in A, "Turkish"	20 December 1775	19	Salzburg
238	238	238	Piano Concerto No. 6 in B♭	January 1776	19–20	Salzburg
239	239	239	Serenade No. 6 in D, "Serenata notturna"	January 1776	19–20	Salzburg
240	240	240	Divertimento No. 9 in B♭	January 1776	19–20	Salzburg
252	252	240a	Divertimento No. 12 in E♭	January and August 1776	19–20	Salzburg
188	188	240b	Divertimento No. 6 in C	Mid 1773	17	Salzburg
224	224	241a	Church Sonata No. 7 in F	early 1776?	19–20	Salzburg
225	225	241b	Church Sonata No. 8 in A	early 1776?	19–20	Salzburg
241	241	241	Church Sonata No. 9 in G	January 1776	19–20	Salzburg
242	242	242	Concerto in F for three (or two) Pianos, No. 7, "Lodron"	February 1776	20	Salzburg
243	243	243	Litaniae de venerabili altaris sacramento in E♭	March 1776	20	Salzburg
244	244	244	Church Sonata No. 10 in F	April 1776	20	Salzburg
245	245	245	Church Sonata No. 11 in D	April 1776	20	Salzburg
246	246	246	Piano Concerto No. 8 in C, "Lützow"	April 1776	20	Salzburg
262	262	246a	Missa longa in C	1776	19	Salzburg
288	288	246c	Divertimento in F (fragment)	Summer 1776	20	Salzburg
247	247	247	Divertimento No. 10 in F, "Lodron No. 1" ("Lodronische Nachtmusik")	June 1776	20	Salzburg
248	248	248	March in F	June 1776	20	Salzburg
260	260	248a	Offertory in D, "Venite populi"	June 1776	20	Salzburg
250	250	248b	Serenade No. 7 in D, "Haffner"	21 July 1776	20	Salzburg
249	249	249	March in D, "Haffner"	20 July 1776	20	Salzburg
Anh.A 27	101	250a	4 Contredanses, (Serenade No. 2); actually by Michael Haydn			
251	251	251	Divertimento No. 11 in D	July 1776	20	Salzburg
253	253	253	Divertimento No. 13 in F	August 1776	20	Salzburg
254	254	254	Piano Trio No. 1 in B♭ (Divertimento)	August 1776	20	Salzburg
255	255	255	Recitative and Aria for Alto, "Ombra felice"	September 1776	20	Salzburg
256	256	256	Aria for Tenor, "Clarice cara mia sposa"	September 1776	20	Salzburg
257	257	257	Missa in C, "Credo" or "Spaur"	1775 and 1777	19–21	Salzburg
258	258	258	Missa brevis in C, "Piccolomini", formerly misidentified as "Spaur"	1775–1777	19–21	Salzburg
258a	Anh. 13	258a	Kyrie in C (fragment)	1787–1791	31–35	Vienna?
259	259	259	Missa brevis in C, "Organ Solo"	1775–1777	19–21	Salzburg
261	261	261	Adagio in E for Violin and Orchestra	1776	20	Salzburg
269	269	261a	Rondo in B♭ for Violin and Orchestra	1775–1777	19–21	Salzburg
263	263	263	Church Sonata No. 12 in C	December 1776	20	Salzburg
286	286	269a	Notturno in D for Four Orchestras (Serenade No. 8)	December 1776 or January 1777	20	Salzburg
Anh.C 29.01		269b	12 Contredanses for Graf Czernin (actually by Michael Haydn)			
270	270	270	Divertimento No. 14 in B♭	January 1777	20–21	Salzburg
271	271	271	Piano Concerto No. 9 in E♭, "Jeunehomme"	January 1777	20–21	Salzburg
267	267	271c	4 Contredanses	1777	20–21	Salzburg
274	274	271d	Church Sonata No. 13 in G	1777	21	Salzburg
278	278	271e	Church Sonata No. 14 in C	March – April 1777	21	Salzburg
266	266	271f	Trio in B♭	Spring 1777	20–21	Salzburg
289	289	271g	Divertimento No. 16 in E♭ (doubtful)	1777	21	Salzburg
287	287	271H	Divertimento No. 15 in B♭ major, "Lodron No. 2" ("Lodronische Nachtmusik")	June 1777	21	Salzburg
271a	271a	271i	Violin Concerto "No. 7" in D (possibly authentic; doubtful)	16 July 1777	21	Salzburg or Paris?
314	314	271k	Oboe Concerto in C / Flute Concerto No. 2 in D	January or February 1778	21–22	Mannheim
272	272	272	Recitative and Aria for Soprano, "Ah, lo previdi"	August 1777	21	Salzburg
277	277	272a	Offertory in F, "Alma Dei creatoris"	Summer or Autumn 1777	21	Salzburg
275	275	272b	Missa brevis in B♭	23 September 1777	21	Salzburg
273	273	273	Hymn in F, "Sancta Maria, mater Dei"	9 September 1777	21	Salzburg
309	309	284b	Piano Sonata No. 7 in C	October – November 1777	21	Mannheim
311	311	284c	Piano Sonata No. 9 in D	October – November 1777	21	Mannheim
307	307	284d	Arietta in C, "Oiseaux, si tous les ans"	30 October 1777 and 13 March 1778	21–22	Mannheim
Anh.A 42		284e	(Flute?) Concerto, really by Johann Baptist Wendling	November 1777	21	Mannheim
284f		284f	Rondeau for Piano (lost)	28/29 November 1777	21	Munich
285	285	285	Flute Quartet No. 1 in D	25 December 1777	21	Mannheim
285a		285a	Flute Quartet No. 2 in G (doubtful)	25 December 1777 and 14 February 1778	21–22	Mannheim
285b	Anh. 171	285b	Flute Quartet No. 3 in C	1781–1782	25–26	Vienna
313	313	285c	Flute Concerto No. 1 in G	January or February 1778	21–22	Mannheim
315	315	285e	Andante in C for Flute and Orchestra	January or February 1778	21–22	Mannheim
291,01		Anh. A 52	Adagio in D for Orchestra	1780	24	
301	301	293a	Violin Sonata No. 18 in G	February 1778	22	Mannheim
302	302	293b	Violin Sonata No. 19 in E♭	February 1778	22	Mannheim
303	303	293c	Violin Sonata No. 20 in C	February 1778	22	Mannheim
305	305	293d	Violin Sonata No. 22 in A	Spring 1778	22	Mannheim
Anh.G (various)		293e	19 Song Cadenzas	Spring 1778	22	Mannheim
294	294	294	Recitative and Aria for Soprano, "Alcandro, lo confesso"	24 February 1778	22	Mannheim
295	295	295	Aria for Tenor, "Se al labbro mio non credi"	27 February 1778	22	Mannheim
486a	486a	295a	Recitative and Aria for Soprano, "Basta, vincesti"	27 February 1778	22	Mannheim
308	308	295b	Arietta, "Dans un bois solitaire"	30 October 1777 and 13 March 1778	21–22	Mannheim
296	296	296	Violin Sonata No. 17 in C	11 March 1778	22	Mannheim
322	322	296a	Kyrie in E♭ (fragment; completed by M. Stadler)	early 1778	22	Mannheim
296c		296c	Sanctus in E♭ (in conjunction with K. 322/296a)	early 1778	22	Mannheim
297a	Anh. 1	297a	8 Pieces in a Miserere (lost)	Spring 1778	22	Paris
297b	Anh. 9	297b	Sinfonia Concertante for Four Winds in E♭ (lost)	April 1778	22	Paris
299	299	297c	Concerto for Flute and Harp in C	April 1778	22	Paris
298	298	298	Flute Quartet No. 4 in A	1786–1787	30–31	Vienna
354	354	299a	12 Variations for Piano on "Je suis Lindor"	1778	22	Paris
299b	Anh. 10	299b	Ballet, Les petits riens	11 July 1778	22	Paris
299c		299c	Ballet Intermezzo (fragment)	Summer 1778	22	Paris
320f	Anh. 103	299d	La Chasse (fragment)	Autumn 1778	22	Paris
300	300	300	Gavotte	1778	22	Paris
297	297	300a	Symphony No. 31 in D, "Paris"	late May/early June 1778	22	Paris
316	316	300b	Recitative and Aria for Soprano, "Popoli di Tessaglia"	8 January 1779	23	Munich
304	304	300c	Violin Sonata No. 21 in E minor	early summer 1778	22	Paris
310	310	300d	Piano Sonata No. 8 in A minor	Summer 1778	22	Paris
265	265	300e	Twelve Variations on "Ah vous dirai-je, Maman"	1781/1782	25	Vienna
353	353	300f	12 Variations in E♭ on "La belle Françoise"	1778	22	Paris
395	395	300g	Capriccio in C for Piano	1778	22	Munich
330	330	300h	Piano Sonata No. 10 in C	1783	27	Vienna or Salzburg
331	331	300i	Piano Sonata No. 11 in A, "Alla Turca"	1783	27	Vienna or Salzburg
332	332	300k	Piano Sonata No. 12 in F	1783	27	Vienna or Salzburg
306	306	300l	Violin Sonata No. 23 in D	Summer 1778	22	Paris
311A	Anh. 8	311A	Overture (lost or unidentified)	August 1778	22	Paris
315b	Anh. 3	315b	Scena	late August 1778	22	St. Germain
333	333	315c	Piano Sonata No. 13 in B♭, "Linz"	1783–1784	27–28	Linz and Vienna
264	264	315d	9 Variations in C on "Lison dormait"	late August or September 1778	22	Paris
315e	Anh. 11	315e	Music to "Semiramis"	November 1778	21	Mannheim
315f	Anh. 56	315f	Concerto for Violin, Piano, and Orchestra (fragment)	November 1778	21	Mannheim
315a	315a	315g	8 Minuets	early 1779	23	Salzburg
365	365	316a	Concerto in E♭ for Two Pianos, No. 10	early 1779	23	Salzburg
317	317	317	"Coronation Mass" in C	23 March 1779	23	Salzburg
329	329	317a	Church Sonata No. 15 in C	March 1779?	23	Salzburg
146	146	317b	Aria for Soprano in B♭, "Kommet her, ihr frechen Sünder"	March or April 1779	23	Salzburg
328	328	317c	Church Sonata No. 16 in C	early 1779?	22–23	Salzburg
378	378	317d	Violin Sonata No. 26 in B♭; arranged by Johann Anton André as Clarinet Quartet, Op. 79, No. 1	early 1779	22–23	Salzburg
318	318	318	Symphony No. 32 in G	26 April 1779	23	Salzburg
319	319	319	Symphony No. 33 in B♭	9 July 1779	23	Salzburg
320	320	320	Serenade No. 9 in D, "Posthorn"	3 August 1779	23	Salzburg
335	335	320a	Two marches in D	early August 1779	23	Salzburg
246b	246b	320B	Divertimento in D (fragment)	1772/1773	16–17	
334	334	320b	Divertimento No. 17 in D major	Summer 1780	24	Salzburg
445	445	320c	March in D	Summer 1780	24	Salzburg
364	364	320d	Sinfonia Concertante for Violin, Viola and Orchestra in E♭	1779	23	Salzburg
320e	Anh. 104	320e	Sinfonia Concertante for Violin, Viola, and Cello (fragment)	Summer 1779	23	Salzburg
321	321	321	Vesperae solennes de Dominica	1779	23	Salzburg
321a		321a	Magnificat in C (fragment)	1779	23	Salzburg
276	276	321b	Regina Coeli in C	1779	23	Salzburg
323	Anh. 15	323	Kyrie in C (fragment; completed by M. Stadler)	1779?	23	Salzburg
323a	Anh. 20	323a	Gloria in C (in conjunction with K. 323)	1779?	23	Salzburg
345	345	336a	Choruses and Entr'actes for Thamos, König in Ägypten	1779	23	Salzburg
344	344	336b	Zaide (Das Serail)	1779	23	Salzburg
343	343	336c	2 German Hymns	c. early 1787	30–31	Prague or Vienna
336	336	336d	Church Sonata No. 17 in C	March 1780	24	Salzburg
337	337	337	Missa solemnis in C	March 1780	24	Salzburg
338	338	338	Symphony No. 34 in C	29 August 1780	24	Salzburg
339	339	339	Vesperae solennes de confessore	1780	24	Salzburg
392	392	340a	Song, "Verdankt sei es dem Glanz"	August 1781 and May 1782	25–26	Vienna
391	391	340b	Song, "Sei du mein Trost, verschwiegne Traurigkeit"	August 1781 and May 1782	25–26	Vienna
390	390	340c	Song, "Ich würd auf meinem Pfad mit Tränen"	August 1781 and May 1782	25–26	Vienna
363	363	363	3 Minuets for Orchestra	1780	24	Salzburg
365a	Anh. 11a	365a	Scene for Schikanender's Peter der Grausame (fragment)	1780	24	Munich
366	366	366	Idomeneo, re di Creta	29 January 1781	25	Salzburg and Munich
367	367	367	Ballet for Idomeneo	29 January 1781	25	Salzburg and Munich
349	349	367a	Song, "Die Zufriedenheit"	8 November 1780 and mid-March 1781	24	Munich
351	351	367b	Song, "Komm, liebe Zither"	8 November 1780 and mid-March 1781	24	Munich
368	368	368	Recitative and Aria for Soprano, "Ma che vi fece"	January 1781	24–25	Munich
341	341	368a	Kyrie in D minor	1787–1791	31–35	Vienna
370	370	368b	Oboe Quartet in F	early 1781	24–25	Munich
369	369	369	Recitative and Aria for Soprano, "Misera, dove son!"	8 March 1781	25	Munich
361	361	370a	Serenade No. 10 for Winds in B♭, "Gran Partita"	1783–1784	27–28	Vienna
370b	Anh. 97	370b	Horn Concerto movement in E♭	21 March 1781	25	Vienna
371	371	371	Rondo in E♭ for Horn	21 March 1781	25	Vienna
372	372	372	Allegro in B♭ for Violin and Piano (fragment; completed by M. Stadler)	24 March 1781	25	Vienna
400	400	372a	Allegro in B♭ for Piano (fragment; completed by M. Stadler)	1781	25	Vienna
373	373	373	Rondo in C for Violin and Orchestra	2 April 1781	25	Vienna
379	379	373a	Violin Sonata No. 27 in G	April 1781	25	Vienna
374	374	374	Recitative and Aria for Soprano, "A questo seno deh vieni"	April 1781	25	Vienna
359	359	374a	12 Variations in G on "La Bergère Célimène" (by Antoine Albanèse 1729/31–1800)	June 1781	25	Vienna
360	360	374b	6 Variations in G minor on "Hélas, j'ai perdu mon amant" (recte "Au bord d'une fontaine" by Antoine Albanèse)	June 1781	25	Vienna
352	352	374c	8 Variations in F on "Dieu d'amour" from Les mariages samnites by André Grétry	June 1781	25	Vienna
376	376	374d	Violin Sonata No. 24 in F	Summer 1781	25	Vienna
377	377	374e	Violin Sonata No. 25 in F	Summer 1781	25	Vienna
380	380	374f	Violin Sonata No. 28 in E♭; arranged by Johann Anton André as Clarinet Quartet, Op. 79, No. 2	Summer 1781	25	Vienna
374g	Anh. 46	374g	Andantino in B♭ for Cello and Piano (fragment)	1782	26	Vienna
375	375	375	Serenade No. 11 in E♭ for Winds	15 October 1781	25	Vienna
448	448	375a	Sonata in D for Two Pianos	November 1781	25	Vienna
375b	Anh. 42	375b	Movement to a Piano Sonata for two Pianos in B♭	Spring 1782	26	Vienna
375c	Anh. 43	375c	Movement to a Piano Sonata for two Pianos in B♭	Spring 1782	26	Vienna
375d	Anh. 45	375d	Fugue in G for Two Pianos (fragment)	Spring 1782	26	Vienna
401	401	375e	Fugue in G minor for Organ (fragment)	Spring 1782	26	Vienna
Anh.H 12,14	153	375f	Fugue in G for Piano (fragment)	Spring 1782	26	Vienna
Anh.H 12,01	Anh. 41	375g	Fugue in G for Piano (fragment)	Spring 1782	26	Vienna
Anh.H 12,18		375h	Fugue in F for Piano (fragment; = K. 626b/14)	Spring 1782	26	Vienna
382	382	382	Rondo for Piano and Orchestra in D	March 1782	26	Vienna
Anh.H 10,22	229	382a	Canon in C minor for 3 voices in 1 (doubtful)	1782	26	Vienna
Anh.H 10,23	230	382b	Canon in C minor for 2 voices in 1 (doubtful)	1782	26	Vienna
231	231	382c	Canon in B♭ for 6 voices in 1, "Leck mich im Arsch" (doubtful)	1782	26	Vienna
Anh.A 39	233	382d	Canon in B♭ for 3 voices in 1, "Leck mir den Arsch fein recht schön sauber" (Wenzel Trnka)	1782	26	Vienna
Anh.A 40	234	382e	Canon in G for 3 voices in 1, "Bei der Hitz im Sommer eß ich" (Wenzel Trnka)	1782	26	Vienna
Anh.H 10,13	347	382f	Canon in D for 6 voices in 1	1782	26	Vienna
Anh.H 10,02	348	382g	Canon in G for 12 voices in 3, "V'amo di core teneramente" (doubtful)	1782	26	Vienna
119	119	382h	Aria for Soprano, "Der Liebe himmlisches Gefühl" (doubtful)	1782	26	Vienna
383	383	383	Aria for Soprano, "Nehmt meinen Dank, ihr holden Gönner!"	10 April 1782	26	Vienna
394	394	383a	Prelude and Fugue in C for Piano	early 1782	25–26	Vienna
Anh.H 12,26	Anh. 33 & Anh. 40	383b	Fugue for Piano in F (fragment)	Spring 1782	26	Vienna
383C	Anh. 32	383C	Fantasia in F minor for Piano (fragment)	1789	33	Vienna
383d	Anh. 38	383c	Theme and Variations for Organ in C (fragment)	Spring 1782	26	Vienna
383d	Anh. 38	383d	Theme for Variations in C (fragment)	Spring 1782	26	Vienna
408,01	408	383e	March in C	September 1782	26	Vienna
408,03	408c	383F	March in C	1782	26	Vienna
409	409	383f	Symphonic Minuet in C	May 1782	26	Vienna?
383g	Anh. 100	383g	Symphony in E♭ (fragment, lost)	May 1782	26	Vienna?
440	440	383h	Aria for Soprano "In te spero, o sposo amato"	May 1782	26	Vienna?
467a		383i	Movement to a Symphony in C (fragment)	May 1782	26	Vienna
384	384	384	Die Entführung aus dem Serail	16 July 1782	26	Vienna
389	389	384A	Duet for two Voices "Welch ängstliches Beben"	April 1782	26	Vienna
388	388	384a	Serenade No. 12 in C minor for Winds (later arranged as K. 406/516b)	July 1782 or late 1783	26–27	Vienna
384B		384B	Andante for Winds in B♭ (fragment)	1782	26	Vienna
384b		384b	March for Winds in B♭ (in conjunction with K. 384B)	July 1782	26	Vienna
196g	Anh. 96	384c	Allegro for Winds (in conjunction with K. 384b)	July 1782	26	Vienna
385	385	385	Symphony No. 35 in D, "Haffner"	July 1782	26	Vienna
408,02	408b	385a	March in D	1782	26	Vienna
Anh.H 20,01–12	393	385b	Solfeggios for Voice	August 1782?	26	Vienna
403	403	385c	Violin Sonata No. 30 in C (fragment; completed by M. Stadler)	1782?	26	Vienna
404	404	385d	Violin Sonata No. 31 in C (fragment; completed by M. Stadler)	1782	26	Vienna
480a	Anh.48/480a	385E	Allegro for Piano and Violin (fragment)	1782	26	Vienna
402	402	385e	Violin Sonata No. 29 in A (fragment; completed by M. Stadler)	August or September 1782	26	Vienna
396	396	385f	Fantasia for Piano & Violin in C minor (fragment)	August or September 1782	26	Vienna
397	397	385g	Fantasia in D minor (fragment)	1782	26	Vienna
385h	Anh. 34	385h	Adagio in D for Piano or Organ	1782	26	Vienna
399	399	385i	Suite in C for Piano (Overture, Allemande, Courante, & incomplete Sarabande)	early 1782	25–26	Vienna
Anh.H 12,11	154	385k	Fugue for Piano in G minor	early 1782	25–26	Vienna
Anh.H 12,29		385n	Fugue for four Singers in A	late 1782	26	Vienna
		385o	Piano Concerto in A (fragment; a sketch to K. 414)	late 1782	26	Vienna
414	414	385p	Piano Concerto No. 12 in A	1782	26	Vienna
386	386	386	Rondo for Piano and Orchestra in A	1782–1783	26–27	Vienna
412	412	386b	Horn Concerto No. 1 in D	1791	35	Vienna
407	407	386c	Horn Quintet in E♭	End of 1782	26	Vienna
386d	Anh. 25	386d	O Calpe! Dir donnert's am Fuße (Gibraltar) (fragment)	December 1782	26	Vienna
387	387	387	String Quartet No. 14 in G, "Spring"	31 December 1782	26	Vienna
413	413	387a	Piano Concerto No. 11 in F	1782–1783	26–27	Vienna
415	415	387b	Piano Concerto No. 13 in C	1782–1783	26–27	Vienna
Anh.C 21.02		404a	Arrangement of 6 Preludes and Fugues by J.S. and W.F. Bach	1782	26	Vienna
Anh.H 12,10	443	404b	Fugue for String Trio in G	1782	26	Vienna
Anh.A 46	405	405	Arrangement of 5 Fugues by J.S. Bach	1782	26	Vienna
Anh.H 12,27	Anh. 77	405a	Fugue for String Quartet in C minor (fragment)	1782–1784	26–28	Vienna
416	416	416	Scena and Rondo for Soprano, "Mia speranza adorata"	8 January 1783	26	Vienna
416a		416a	German Opera "Der Diener zweier Herren" (lost or unrealised)	8 January 1783	26	Vienna
435	435	416b	Aria for tenor and orchestra (sketch), "Mußt' ich auch durch tausend Drachen"	1783	27	Vienna
433	433	416c	Aria for bass and orchestra (sketch), "Männer suchen stets zu naschen"	1783	27	Vienna
446	446	416d	Music to a Pantomime in D (fragment)	February 1783	27	Vienna
398	398	416e	6 Variations on "Salve tu, Domine"	March 1783	27	Vienna
293	293	416f	Oboe Concerto in F (incomplete)	March 1783	27	Vienna
417	417	417	Horn Concerto No. 2 in E♭	27 May 1783	27	Vienna
427	427	417a	Great Mass in C minor	July 1782 – October 1783	27	Vienna
Anh.H (various)	Anh. 109f	417B	6 Sketches & Fragments to a Mass (K. 698 is an instrumental piece/theme in B♭; the rest is broken up throughout K^{9} Anh. H)	1770–1783	24–27	Vienna
421	421	417b	String Quartet No. 15 in D minor	June 1783	27	Vienna
Anh.H 14,21	Anh. 76	417c	Fugue for String Quartet in D minor (fragment)	1782–1784	26–28	Vienna
417d		417d	Allegro for String Quartet in E minor (fragment)	June 1784	28	Vienna
178	178	417e	Aria for Soprano, "Ah, spiegarti, oh Dio"	c. June 1783	27	Vienna?
418	418	418	Aria for Soprano, "Vorrei spiegarvi, oh Dio!"	20 June 1783	27	Vienna
419	419	419	Aria for Soprano, "No, no, che non sei capace"	June 1783	27	Vienna
420	420	420	Aria for Tenor, "Per pietà, non ricercate"	21 June 1783	27	Vienna
432	432	421a	Recitative and Aria for Bass, "Così dunque tradisci"	1783	27	Vienna
428	428	421b	String Quartet No. 16 in E♭	June – July 1783	27	Vienna
422	422	422	L'oca del Cairo	late 1783	27	Salzburg and Vienna
422a	Anh. 14	422a	Kyrie in D	1787–1789	31–33	Salzburg
423	423	423	Duo in G for Violin and Viola	c. summer 1783	27	Salzburg?
424	424	424	Duo in B♭ for Violin and Viola	c. summer 1783	27	Salzburg?
430	430	424a	Lo sposo deluso	late 1783	27	Salzburg and Vienna
425	425	425	Symphony No. 36 in C, "Linz"	October – November 1783	27	Linz
Anh.A 53	444	425a	Symphony No. 37 in G, Introduction to Symphony No. 25 by Michael Haydn (previously all was Symphony No. 37 in G)	late 1783 or 1784	27–28	Vienna
431	431	425b	Recitative and Aria for Tenor, "Misero! O sogno!"	December 1783	27	Vienna?
426	426	426	Fugue in C minor for Two Pianos	29 December 1783	27	Vienna
426a	Anh. 44	426a	Allegro in C minor for Two Pianos (fragment)	December 1783	27	Vienna
Anh.A 47.03	436	436	Notturno for Two Sopranos and Bass, "Ecco quel fiero" (Gottfried von Jacquin)	1783	27	Vienna
Anh.A 47.04	437	437	Notturno for Two Sopranos and Bass, "Mi lagnerò tacendo" (Gottfried von Jacquin)	1783	27	Vienna
Anh.A 47.02	438	438	Notturno for Two Sopranos and Bass, "Se lontan" (Gottfried von Jacquin)	c. 1783–1786	27–30	Vienna?
Anh.A 47.01	439	439	Notturno for Two Sopranos and Bass, "Due pupille" (Gottfried von Jacquin)	c. 1783–1786	27–30	Vienna?
Anh.A 47.05	346	439a	Notturno for Two Sopranos and Bass, "Luci care, luci belle" (Gottfried von Jacquin)	c. 1783–1786	27–30	Vienna?
439b	Anh. 229	439b	5 Divertimenti in B♭ (doubtful)	1783–1788	27–32	Vienna
441	441	441	Trio for Soprano, Tenor and Bass, "Liebes Manndel, wo ist's Bandel?"	1783	27	Vienna
441a		441a	Song, "Ja! grüß dich Gott"	1783	27	Vienna
442	442	442	3 Unrelated Fragments for a Piano Trio (completed by M. Stadler)	1783–1788	27–32	Vienna
447	447	447	Horn Concerto No. 3 in E♭	c. 1784–1787	28–31	Vienna
461	461	448a	5 (6) Minuets (the sixth is a fragment)	early 1784	27–28	Vienna
462	462	448b	6 Contredanses	January 1784	27–28	Vienna
463	463	448c	2 Minuets with Contredanses	early 1784	27–28	Vienna
449	449	449	Piano Concerto No. 14 in E♭, "First Ployer"	9 February 1784	28	Vienna
450	450	450	Piano Concerto No. 15 in B♭	15 March 1784	28	Vienna
451	451	451	Piano Concerto No. 16 in D	22 March 1784	28	Vienna
452	452	452	Quintet for Piano and Winds in E♭	30 March 1784	28	Vienna
452a	Anh. 54	452a	Quintet for Piano and Winds in B♭ (fragment)	1784	28	Vienna
387c	Anh. 55	452b	Chamber Music with Piano in C (fragment)	1784	28	Vienna
452c	Anh. 65	452c	Movement to a Piano Concerto in C (fragment; in conjunction with K. 453)	April 1784	28	Vienna
453	453	453	Piano Concerto No. 17 in G, "Second Ployer"	12 April 1784	28	Vienna
453a		453a	Funeral March for Piano in C minor	1784	28	Vienna
Anh.H 1,01		453b	Exercise Book for Barbara Ployer (including a Fugue in G minor for String Quartet, K^{9} Anh.H 12,17)	1784	28	
454	454	454	Violin Sonata No. 32 in B♭, for Regina Strinasacchi	21 April 1784	28	Vienna
460	460	454a	Eight/Two (K^{9}) Variations in A major on "Come un agnello" from Sarti's Fra i due litiganti il terzo gode (1782); the long version is spurious (K^{9} Anh.C 26.23)	c. June 1784	28	Vienna
455	455	455	10 Variations in G on "Unser dummer Pöbel meint"	25 August 1784	28	Vienna
456	456	456	Piano Concerto No. 18 in B♭, "Paradis"	30 September 1784	28	Vienna
457	457	457	Piano Sonata No. 14 in C minor	14 October 1784	28	Vienna
458	458	458	String Quartet No. 17 in B♭, "The Hunt"	9 November 1784	28	Vienna
458a	Anh. 75	458a	Minuet for String Quartet in B♭ (fragment)	November 1784	28	Vienna
458b	Anh. 71	458b	Rondo for String Quartet in B♭ (fragment)	November 1784	28	Vienna
459	459	459	Piano Concerto No. 19 in F	11 December 1784	28	Vienna
466a	Anh. 59	459a	Movement to a Piano Concerto in C (in conjunction with K. 459)	December 1784	28	Vienna
464	464	464	String Quartet No. 18 in A	10 January 1785	28	Vienna
464a	Anh. 72	464a	Rondo for String Quartet in A (rondo to K. 464; fragment)	10 January 1785	28	Vienna
465	465	465	String Quartet No. 19 in C, "Dissonance"	14 January 1785	28	Vienna
466	466	466	Piano Concerto No. 20 in D minor	10 February 1785	29	Vienna
467	467	467	Piano Concerto No. 21 in C	9 March 1785	29	Vienna
468	468	468	Song, "Lied zur Gesellenreise"	26 March 1785	29	Vienna
429	429	468a	Cantata, "Dir, Seele des Weltalls" (fragment)	1783	27	Vienna
469	469	469	Davide penitente	13 March 1785	29	Vienna
470	470	470	Andante to a Violin Concerto of Viotti (lost)	1785	29	Vienna
Anh.A 36	152	210a	Canzonetta for voice and piano "Ridente la calma" (arranged from Josef Mysliveček)	ca. 1785	29	Vienna
Anh.A 48		470a	Instrumentation for a Concerto for Violin by G.B. Viotti	April 1785	29	Vienna
471	471	471	Cantata, Die Maurerfreude (Score)	20 April 1785	29	Vienna
472	472	472	Song, "Der Zauberer"	7 May 1785	29	Vienna
473	473	473	Song, "Die Zufriedenheit"	7 May 1785	29	Vienna
474	474	474	Song, "Die betrogene Welt"	7 May 1785	29	Vienna
475	475	475	Fantasia for Piano in C minor	20 May 1785	29	Vienna
475a	Anh. 26	475a	Song, "Einsam bin ich, meine Liebe" in D minor (fragment, doubtful)	1785?	29	Vienna
476	476	476	Song, "Das Veilchen"	8 June 1785	29	Vienna
477a	Anh. 11a	477a	Cantata, "Per la ricuperata salute di Ofelia" (fragment)	September 1785	29	Vienna
478	478	478	Piano Quartet No. 1 in G minor	16 October 1785	29	Vienna
479	479	479	Quartet for soprano, tenor and two basses, "Dite almeno in che mancai" (Score), for La villanella rapita (1785)	5 November 1785	29	Vienna
477	477	479a	Maurerische Trauermusik (Masonic Funeral Music)	November 1785	29	Vienna
480	480	480	Trio for soprano, tenor and bass, "Mandina amabile" (Score), for La villanella rapita (1785)	21 November 1785	29	Vienna
434	434	480b	Aria for tenor, 2 basses and orchestra, "Del gran regno delle amazzone"	End of 1785	29	Vienna
481	481	481	Violin Sonata No. 33 in E♭	12 December 1785	29	Vienna
482	482	482	Piano Concerto No. 22 in E♭	16 December 1785	29	Vienna
483	483	483	Song with chorus, "Zerfließet heut"	End of 1785	29	Vienna
484	484	484	Song with chorus, "Ihr unsre neuen Leiter"	End of 1785	29	Vienna
411	411	484a	Adagio in B♭ for Two Clarinets and Three Basset Horns	c. end of 1785	29	Vienna?
440b	Anh. 95 (440b;484b)	484b	Allegro assai for Winds in B♭ (fragment)	end 1785	29	Vienna
440c	Anh. 93; 440c	484c	Adagio for Winds in F (fragment)	end 1785	29	Vienna
410	410	484d	Adagio in F for Two Basset Horns and Bassoon (= D Anh. III/11)	end 1785	29	Vienna?
484e		484e	Allegro for Basset Horn in F (fragment)	end 1785	29	Vienna
485	485	485	Rondo in D for Piano	10 January 1786	29	Vienna
486	486	486	Der Schauspieldirektor	7 February 1786	30	Vienna
488	488	488	Piano Concerto No. 23 in A	2 March 1786	30	Vienna
488a	Anh. 58	488a	Movement to a Piano Concerto in D (fragment)	March 1786	30	Vienna
488b	Anh. 63	488b	Movement to a Piano Concerto in A (in conjunction with K. 488; fragment)	March 1786	30	Vienna
488c	Anh. 64	488c	Movement to a Piano Concerto in A (in conjunction with K. 488; fragment)	March 1786	30	Vienna
488d		488d	Rondo for a Piano Concerto in A (in conjunction with K. 488; fragment)	March 1786	30	Vienna
489	489	489	Duet for Soprano and Tenor, "Spiegarti no poss'io"	10 March 1786	30	Vienna
490	490	490	Scena and Rondo for Soprano and Tenor, "Non più. Tutto ascoltai – Non temer, amato bene"	10 March 1786	30	Vienna
491	491	491	Piano Concerto No. 24 in C minor	24 March 1786	30	Vienna
537c	Anh. 62	491a	Movement to a Piano Concerto in E♭ (in conjunction with K. 491)	March 1786	30	Vienna
492	492	492	Le nozze di Figaro	1 May 1786	30	Vienna
493	493	493	Piano Quartet No. 2 in E♭	3 June 1786	30	Vienna
493a	Anh. 53	493a	Movement to a Piano Quartet in E♭ (original final movement to K. 493)	3 June 1786	30	Vienna
494	494	494	Rondo in F	10 June 1786	30	Vienna
494a	Anh. 98a	494a	Movement for a Horn Concerto in E (fragment)	Summer 1786	30	Vienna
495	495	495	Horn Concerto No. 4 in E♭	26 June 1786	30	Vienna
495a	Anh. 52	495a	Movement to a Piano Trio in G (in conjunction with K. 496)	June 1786	30	Vienna
496	496	496	Piano Trio No. 2 in G; arranged by Johann Anton André as Clarinet Quartet, Op. 79, No. 3	8 July 1786	30	Vienna
487	487	496a	12 Duos for Two Horns (Nos. 2, 4, 5, 7–12 doubtful)	27 July 1786	30	Vienna
497	497	497	Sonata in F for Piano Four-Hands	1 August 1786	30	Vienna
357,01	357/1	497a	Allegro in G for Piano Four-Hands (in conjunction with K. 500a)	late Summer 1786	30	Vienna
498	498	498	Trio in E♭ for Piano, Clarinet and Viola, "Kegelstatt"	5 August 1786	30	Vienna
499	499	499	String Quartet No. 20 in D, "Hoffmeister"	19 August 1786	30	Vienna
500	500	500	12 Variations in B♭	12 September 1786	30	Vienna
357,02	357/2	500a	Variations and Coda in G for Piano Four-Hands	September 1786	30	Vienna
501	501	501	5 Variations in G	4 November 1786	30	Vienna
501a	Anh. 51	501a	Allegro for Piano Trio in B♭ (fragment)	1786	30	Vienna
502	502	502	Piano Trio No. 3 in B♭	18 November 1786	30	Vienna
502a	Anh. 60	502a	Movement to a Piano Concerto in C (draft to K. 503)	November 1786	30	Vienna
503	503	503	Piano Concerto No. 25 in C	4 December 1786	30	Vienna
504	504	504	Symphony No. 38 in D, "Prague"	6 December 1786	30	Vienna
504a	Anh. 105	504a	Movement to a Symphony in G (in conjunction with K. 504)	December 1786	30	Vienna
505	505	505	Scena and Rondo for Soprano, "Ch'io mi scordi di te?"	26 December 1786	30	Vienna
506	506	506	Song, "Lied der Freiheit"	c. end of 1785	29	Vienna
		506a	Studies for Thomas Attwood	1785–1786	29–30	Vienna
Anh.H 11,15	507	507	Canon in F for 3 voices in 1	After 3 June 1786	30	Vienna
Anh.H 11,16	508	508	Canon in F for 3 voices in 1	After 3 June 1786	30	Vienna
Anh.H 11,18		508A	Canon in C for 3 voices in 1	After 3 June 1786	30	Vienna
Anh.H 11,19–26		508a	2 Canons in F for 3 voices in 1, 14 Canons in F for 2 voices in 1	After 3 June 1786	30	Vienna
509	509	509	6 German Dances	6 February 1787	31	Prague
232	232	509a	Canon in G for 4 voices in 1, "Lieber Freistadtler, lieber Gaulimauli"	After 4 July 1787	31	Vienna
		509b	Comedy "Der Salzburger Lump in Wien"	July 1787?	31?	Vienna
Anh.C 6.01	Anh. 28	509c	Comedy "Die Liebesprobe"	July 1787?	31?	Vienna
511	511	511	Rondo for Piano in A minor	11 March 1787	31	Vienna
512	512	512	Recitative and Aria for Bass, "Alcandro, lo confesso"	19 March 1787	31	Vienna
513	513	513	Aria for Bass, "Mentre ti lascio"	23 March 1787	31	Vienna
514	514	514	Rondo in D for horn and orchestra (actually an arrangement of KV 412,02 by Franz Xaver Süßmayr)			
514a	Anh. 80	514a	Movement for a String Quintet in B♭	1787	31	Vienna
515	515	515	String Quintet No. 3 in C	19 April 1787	31	Vienna
515a	Anh. 87	515a	Movement for a String Quintet in F (in conjunction with K. 515c)	not before March 1791	35	Vienna
228	228	515b	Double Canon in F for 4 voices in 2	24 April 1787	31	Vienna
515c	Anh. 79	515c	Movement for a String Quintet in A minor	not before March 1791	35	Vienna
516	516	516	String Quintet No. 4 in G minor	16 May 1787	31	Vienna
516a	Anh. 86	516a	Rondo for String quintet in G (fragment)	May 1787	32	Vienna
406	406	516b	String Quintet No. 2 in C minor (arrangement of K. 388/384a)	1777/1788	32	Vienna
516c	Anh. 91	516c	Allegro for Clarinet Quintet in B♭ (fragment)	1787	31	Vienna
516d		516d	Rondo for Clarinet Quintet in E♭ (fragment)	1787	31	Vienna
	Anh. 89	516e	Rondo for a Clarinet Quintet in E♭ (fragment)	1787	31	Vienna
Anh.H 24,11		516f	Musical Dice Game in C	1787	31	Vienna
517	517	517	Song, "Die Alte" (fragment)	18 May 1787	31	Vienna
518	518	518	Song, "Die Verschweigung" (fragment)	20 May 1787	31	Vienna
519	519	519	Song, "Das Lied der Trennung"	23 May 1787	31	Vienna
520	520	520	Song, "Als Luise die Briefe ihres ungetreuen Liebhabers verbrannte"	25 May 1787	31	Vienna
521	521	521	Sonata in C for Piano Four-Hands	29 May 1787	31	Vienna
522	522	522	Ein musikalischer Spaß	14 June 1787	31	Vienna
522a	Anh. 108	522a	Rondo for Orchestra in F (in conjunction with K. 522)	14 June 1787	31	Vienna
523	523	523	Song, "Abendempfindung an Laura"	24 June 1787	31	Vienna
524	524	524	Song, "An Chloe"	24 June 1787	31	Vienna
525	525	525	Serenade No. 13 in G, Eine kleine Nachtmusik	10 August 1787	31	Vienna
525a	Anh. 69	525a	Larghetto for Strings in C (draft to K. 525)	10 August 1787	31	Vienna
526	526	526	Violin Sonata No. 35 in A	24 August 1787	31	Vienna
526a	Anh. 50	526a	Movement to a Violin Sonata in A (draft to K. 526)	24 August 1787	31	Vienna
527	527	527	Don Giovanni	28 October 1787	31	Prague
528	528	528	Scena for Soprano, "Bella mia fiamma"	3 November 1787	31	Prague
529	529	529	Song, "Des kleinen Friedrichs Geburtstag"	6 November 1787	31	Prague
530	530	530	Song, "Das Traumbild"	6 November 1787	31	Prague
531	531	531	Song, "Die kleine Spinnerin"	11 December 1787	31	Vienna
Anh.A 54	532	532	Grazie agl'inganni tuoi (La Libertà a Nice), Sketch/fragment for a vocal trio and instruments (Michael Kelly)	1787	31	Vienna
533	533	533	Piano Sonata No. 15 in F	3 January 1788	31	Vienna
534	534	534	Contredanse, "Das Donnerwetter"	14 January 1788	31	Vienna
535	535	535	Contredanse, "La Bataille"	23 January 1788	31	Vienna
535a		535a	3 Contredanses	early 1788	31–32	Vienna
535b	Anh. 107	535b	Contredanse in B♭ (fragment)	early 1788	31–32	Vienna
536	536	536	6 German Dances	27 January 1788	32	Vienna
537	537	537	Piano Concerto No. 26 in D, "Coronation"	24 February 1788	32	Vienna
537a	Anh. 57	537a	Movement to a Piano Concerto in D (in conjunction with K. 537)	February 1788	32	Vienna
537b	Anh. 61	537b	Movement to a Piano Concerto in D minor (in conjunction with K. 537)	February 1788	32	Vienna
Anh.A 55		537d	Arrangement of Aria for Tenor by Carl Philipp Emanuel Bach	February 1788	32	Vienna
538	538	538	Aria for Soprano, "Ah se in ciel"	4 March 1788	32	Vienna
539	539	539	Song, "Ein deutsches Kriegslied"	5 March 1788	32	Vienna
540	540	540	Adagio in B minor for Piano	19 March 1788	32	Vienna
540a		540a	Aria for Tenor, "Dalla sua pace"	24 April 1788	32	Vienna
540b		540b	Duet for Soprano and Bass, "Per queste tue manine"	28 April 1788	32	Vienna
540c		540c	Recitative and Aria for Soprano, "In quali eccessi … Mi tradì quell'alma ingrata"	30 April 1788	32	Vienna
541	541	541	Arietta for Bass, "Un bacio di mano"	May 1788	32	Vienna
542	542	542	Piano Trio No. 4 in E	22 June 1788	32	Vienna
543	543	543	Symphony No. 39 in E♭	26 June 1788	32	Vienna
544	544	544	Incipit of "March in D 'Ein kleiner Marsch'" (fragment)	28 June 1788	32	Vienna
545	545	545	Piano Sonata No. 16 in C, "'Facile'"	26 June 1788	32	Vienna
546	546	546	Adagio and Fugue in C minor	26 June 1788	32	Vienna
546a	Anh. 47	546a	Allegro for Piano & Violin in G (fragment)	Summer 1787	31	Vienna
547	547	547	Violin Sonata No. 36 in F, "für Anfänger"	10 July 1788	32	Vienna
547a	Anh. 135	547a	Piano Sonata in F (fragment?)	July 1788	32	Vienna
54	54	Anh. 138a; 547b	5 Variations in F for Piano	July 1788	32	Vienna
548	548	548	Piano Trio No. 5 in C	14 July 1788	32	Vienna
549	549	549	Canzonetta for two Sopranos and Bass, "Piu non si trovano"	16 July 1788	32	Vienna?
550	550	550	Symphony No. 40 in G minor, "Great G minor Symphony"	25 July 1788	32	Vienna
551	551	551	Symphony No. 41 in C, "Jupiter"	10 August 1788	32	Vienna
552	552	552	Song, "Beim Auszug in das Feld"	11 August 1788	32	Vienna
553	553	553	Canon in C for 4 voices in 1, "Alleluia"	2 September 1788	32	Vienna
554	554	554	Canon in F for 4 voices in 1, "Ave Maria"	2 September 1788	32	Vienna
555	555	555	Canon in A minor for 4 voices in 1, "Lacrimoso son'io"	2 September 1788	32	Vienna
556	556	556	Canon in G for 4 voices in 1, "Grechtelt's enk"	2 September 1788	32	Vienna
557	557	557	Canon in F minor for 4 voices in 1, "Nascoso e il mio sol"	2 September 1788	32	Vienna
558	558	558	Canon in B♭ for 4 voices in 1, "Gehen wir im Prater"	2 September 1788	32	Vienna
559	559	559	Canon in F for 3 voices in 1, "Difficile lectu mihi Mars"	2 September 1788	32	Vienna
560	560a	559a	Canon in F for 4 voices in 1, "O du eselhafter Peierl"	2 September 1788	32	Vienna
560	560b	560	Canon in F for 4 voices in 1, "O du eselhafter Martin"	2 September 1788	32	Vienna
561	561	561	Canon in A for 4 voices in 1, "Bona nox! bist a rechta Ox"	2 September 1788	32	Vienna
562	562	562	Canon in A for 3 voices in 1, "Caro bell'idol mio"	2 September 1788	32	Vienna
Anh.H 10,16		562a	Canon in B♭ for 4 voices in 1	September 1788	32	Vienna
562c	Anh. 191	562c	Canon in C for 4 voices in 1	September 1788	32	Vienna
562e	Anh. 66	562e	String Trio in G (in conjunction with K. 563)	September 1788	32	Vienna
563	563	563	Divertimento in E♭ (Trio in E♭)	27 September 1788	32	Vienna
564	564	564	Piano Trio No. 6 in G	27 October 1788	32	Vienna
565	565	565	2 Contredanses (lost)	30 October 1788	32	Vienna
565a		565a	Contredanse in D (fragment)	October 1788	32	Vienna
Anh.A 56	566	566	Arrangement of Händel's Acis und Galathea	November 1788	32	Vienna
567	567	567	6 German Dances	6 December 1788	32	Vienna
568	568	568	12 Minuets	24 December 1788	32	Vienna
569	569	569	Aria "Ohne Zwang" (lost)	1789	33	Vienna
569a	Anh. 31	569a	Sonata movement for Piano in B♭ (fragment)	1787–1789	31–33	Vienna
570	570	570	Piano Sonata No. 17 in B♭	February 1789	33	Vienna
571	571	571	6 German Dances for Orchestra	21 February 1789	33	Vienna
571A	Anh. 106	571A	Minuet in A (fragment)	February 1789	33	Vienna
571a	Anh. 5	571a	Quartet for Soprano, two Tenors and Bass, "Caro mio Druck und Schluck"	c. 1789	33	Vienna?
Anh.A 57	572	572	Arrangement of Händel's Messiah	March 1789	33	Vienna
572a	Anh. 4	572a	Double canon for six voices (lost or unidentified)	March 1789	33	Leipzig
573	573	573	9 Variations in D	29 April 1789	33	Potsdam
574	574	574	Kleine Gigue in G for Piano	16 May 1789	33	Leipzig
575	575	575	String Quartet No. 21 in D, first of the three "Prussian Quartets"	June 1789	33	Vienna
576	576	576	Piano Sonata No. 18 in D	July 1789	33	Vienna
385h,02	Anh. 34/2	576a	Minuet for Piano in D	July 1789	33	Vienna
355	355	576b	Minuet for Piano in D	July 1789	33	Vienna
577	577	577	Rondo for Soprano, "Al desio, di chi t'adora"	July 1789	33	Vienna
578	578	578	Aria for Soprano, "Alma grande e nobil core"	August 1789	33	Vienna
579	579	579	Aria for Soprano, "Un moto di gioia mi sento"	August 1789	33	Vienna
580	580	580	Aria for Soprano, "Schon lacht der holde Frühling"	17 September 1789	33	Vienna
580a	Anh. 94	580a	Adagio for Winds in F	September 1789	33	Vienna
580b	Anh. 90	580b	Movement for a Clarinet Quintet in F	September 1789	33	Vienna
581	581	581	Clarinet Quintet in A	29 September 1789	33	Vienna
581a	Anh. 88	581a	Movement for a Clarinet Quintet in A	September 1789	33	Vienna
582	582	582	Aria for Soprano, "Chi sà, chi sà, qual sia"	October 1789	33	Vienna
583	583	583	Aria for Soprano, "Vado, ma dove? -- oh Dei!"	October 1789	33	Vienna
584	584	584	Aria for bass, "Rivolgete a lui lo sguardo"	December 1789	33	Vienna
585	585	585	12 Minuets	December 1789	33	Vienna
586	586	586	12 German Dances	December 1789	33	Vienna
587	587	587	Contredanse in C, "Der Sieg vom Helden Koburg"	December 1789	33	Vienna
587a	Anh. 85	587a	Allegro for String Quartet in G minor (fragment)	End 1789	33	Vienna
588	588	588	Così fan tutte	26 January 1790	33	Vienna
106	106	588a	Overture and 3 Contredanses (doubtful)	January 1790	33–34	Vienna
Anh.A 41	236	588b/Anh. 36	Andantino for Piano in E♭ (arranged from Christoph Willibald Gluck, "Non vi turbate")	1790	34	Vienna
589	589	589	String Quartet No. 22 in B♭, second of three "Prussian Quartets"	May 1790	34	Vienna
589a	Anh. 68	589a	Movement for a String Quintet B♭ (in conjunction with K. 590)	May 1790	34	Vienna
589b	Anh. 73	589b	Movement for a String Quintet F (in conjunction with K. 590)	May 1790	34	Vienna
590	590	590	String Quartet No. 23 in F, third of the three "Prussian Quartets"	June 1790	34	Vienna
590a	Anh. 29	590a	Sonata movement for Piano in F (fragment)	1787–1789	31–33	Vienna
590b	Anh. 30	590b	Rondo for Piano in F (fragment)	1787–1789	31–33	Vienna
590c	Anh. 37	590c	Rondo for Piano in F (fragment)	1787–1789	31–33	Vienna
312	312	189i/590d	Sonata movement for Piano in G minor (fragment)	1790/1791	34–35	Vienna
Anh.A 58	591	591	Arrangement of Händel's Alexander's Feast	July 1790	34	Vienna
Anh.A 63	592	592	Arrangement of Händel's Ode to Saint Cæcelia	July 1790	34	Vienna
Anh.A 64	625	592a	Comical Duet for Soprano and Bass, "Nun, liebes Weibchen"	August 1790	34	Vienna
592b	Anh. 83	592b	Movement for a String Quintet in D (draft for K. 593)	August 1790	34	Vienna
593	593	593	String Quintet No. 5 in D	December 1790	34	Vienna
593a	Anh. 35	593a	Adagio for Organ in D minor (fragment)	December 1790	34	Vienna
594	594	594	Adagio and Allegro in F minor for Mechanical Organ	October – December 1790	34	Vienna and ?
595	595	595	Piano Concerto No. 27 in B♭	5 January 1791	34	Vienna
596	596	596	Song, "Sehnsucht nach dem Frühling"	14 January 1791	34	Vienna
597	597	597	Song, "Im Frülingsanfang"	14 January 1791	34	Vienna
598	598	598	Song, "Das Kinderspiel"	14 January 1791	34	Vienna
599	599	599	6 Minuets	23 January 1791	34	Vienna
600	600	600	6 German Dances	29 January 1791	35	Vienna
601	601	601	4 Minuets	5 February 1791	35	Vienna
602	602	602	4 German Dances	5 February 1791	35	Vienna
603	603	603	2 Contredanses	5 February 1791	35	Vienna
604	604	604	2 Minuets	12 February 1791	35	Vienna
605	605	605	Three German Dances	12 February 1791	35	Vienna
607	607	605a	Contredanse, "Il Trionfo delle Donne" (fragment)	28 February 1791	35	Vienna
606	606	606	6 "Ländler"	28 February 1791	35	Vienna
608	608	608	Fantasia in F minor for a Mechanical Organ	3 March 1791	35	Vienna
609	609	609	5 Contredanses	1791	35	Vienna
610	610	610	Contredanse, "Les filles malicieuses"	6 March 1791	35	Vienna
611	611	611	German Dance	6 March 1791	35	Vienna
612	612	612	Aria for Bass, "Per questa bella mano"	8 March 1791	35	Vienna
613	613	613	8 Variations in F on "Ein Weib ist das herrlichste Ding"	March 1791	35	Vienna
613a	Anh. 81	613a	Allegro for String Quintet in E♭ (fragment)	March 1791	35	Vienna
613b	Anh. 82	613b	Allegro for String Quintet in E♭ (fragment)	March 1791	35	Vienna
614	614	614	String Quintet No. 6 in E♭	12 April 1791	35	Vienna
615	615	615	Chorus "Viviamo felici" (lost)	1791	35	Vienna
615a		615a	Andante in F for a Small Mechanical Organ	1791	35	Vienna
616	616	616	Andante in F for a Small Mechanical Organ	4 May 1791	35	Vienna
616a		616a	Fantasia in C for glass harmonica, flute, oboe, viola, and cello (fragment)	April–June 1791	35	Vienna
617	617	617	Adagio and Rondo for glass harmonica, flute, oboe, viola and cello	23 May 1791	35	Vienna
356	356	617a	Adagio in C for Glass Harmonica	1791	35	Vienna
618	618	618	Motet in D, "Ave verum Corpus"	17 June 1791	35	Baden
619	619	619	Cantata, "Die ihr des unermeßlichen Weltalls"	July 1791	35	Vienna
620	620	620	Die Zauberflöte	30 September 1791	35	Vienna
620a	Anh. 102	620a	Overture in E♭ (draft to Die Zauberflöte)	September 1791	35	Vienna
Anh.H 24,04	Anh. 78	620b	Contrapuntal Study	September 1791	35	Vienna
621	621	621	La clemenza di Tito	6 September 1791	35	Prague
621a	Anh. 245	621a	Aria for Bass, "Io ti lascio, o cara, addio"	c. September 1791	35	Prague?
584b	584b	621b	Basset horn Concerto in G (fragment)	October 1791	35	Vienna
622	622	622	Clarinet Concerto in A	October 1791	35	Vienna
623	623	623	Kleine Freimaurer-Kantate "Laut verkünde unsre Freude", cantata for solo voices, men's choir and orchestra, text by Emanuel Schikaneder	15 November 1791	35	Vienna
623a		623a	Song, "Laßt uns mit geschlungnen Händen" (intended final chorus to K. 623; doubtful)	November 1791	35	Vienna
Anh.G (various)	624	626a	Cadenzas for Piano Concertos; K. 40i, 107/1, 175, 238, 246, 271, 365, 413, 414, 415, 449, 450, 451, 453, 456, 459, 488 & 595	1768–1791	12–35	Vienna
626	626	626	Requiem in D minor	October–December 1791	35	Vienna
Anh.A 66		626b/16	Allegro in D major, K. 626b/16	1773 (uncertain)		Vienna
Anh.H 19,03		626b/48	Finger Exercises for Piano in C	End of 1780	24	Vienna
Anh.C 1.39	221	Anh. A 1	Kyrie in C major	spurious (by Johann Ernst Eberlin)		
Anh.C 1.40	Anh. 21	Anh. A 2	Lacrimosa in C minor	spurious (by Johann Ernst Eberlin)		
Anh.C 3.42	327	Anh. A 10	Adoramus te in C minor	spurious (by Quirino Gasparini)		
Anh.A 22	93	Anh. A 22	"De profundis clamavi" in C minor	spurious (by Johann Georg Reutter)		
Anh.A 51	18	Anh. A 51	Symphony No. 3 in E♭	spurious (by Carl Friedrich Abel; Mozart substituted two clarinets for 2 oboes)		
Anh.A 52	291	Anh. A 52	Fugue in D major	spurious; by Michael Haydn		
46	46	Anh. B	Quintet in B♭	spurious; anonymous arrangement of parts of K. 361/370a		
140	140	Anh. C 1.12	Missa brevis in G (doubtful)	1773	17	Salzburg
142	142	Anh. C 3.04	"Tantum ergo" in B♭ major (doubtful)	Mozart's authorship doubtful		
197	197	Anh. C 3.05	"Tantum ergo" in D major (doubtful)	Mozart's authorship doubtful		
Anh.C 1.13	340	Anh. C 3.06	Kyrie (lost; doubtful)	1780	24	Salzburg
198	198	Anh. C 3.08	Offertorium "Sub tuum praesidium" (doubtful)	1773	17	Salzburg
Anh.C 3.09	177	Anh. C 3.09	Convertentur sedentes in D major	spurious (by Leopold Mozart)		
Anh.C 8.55		Anh. C 3.15	Sancta Maria in G major	spurious (by Friedrich Heinrich Himmel)		
Anh.C 8.48	350	Anh. C 8.48	Wiegenlied ("Schlafe mein Prinzchen")	spurious (by Bernhard Flies)		
Anh.C 9.03	441b	Anh. C 9.03	Canon for two voices, "Beym Arsch ist’s finster"	1783	27	Vienna
Anh.C 11.02	17	Anh. C 11.02	Symphony No. 2 in B♭	spurious (by Leopold Mozart)		
74g	Anh. 216; K^{3} 74g	Anh. C 11.03	Symphony No. 54 in B♭ (doubtful)	1771	15	Salzburg
Anh.C 11.04	98	Anh. C 11.04	Symphony No. 56 in F (doubtful)	November 1771?	15?	Milan?
Anh.C 11.07		Anh. C 11.07	Symphony in D (lost or unidentified)	1769?	13?	Salzburg?
Anh.C 11.08		Anh. C 11.08	Symphony in F (lost)	1769?	13?	Salzburg?
Anh.C 13.01		Anh. C 13.01	Minuet with trio in C	spurious (by Kaspar Anton Karl van Beethoven)		
Anh.C 13.02	510	Anh. C 13.02	Country Dances (9) ("Quadrilles"), spurious	spurious		
Anh.C 14.01	297b	Anh. C 14.01	Sinfonia concertante in E♭ major, spurious	spurious		
Anh.C 14.04	268	Anh. C 14.04	Violin Concerto "No. 6" in E♭ (spurious)	1780?	24	Munich?
Anh.C 14.06		Anh. C 14.06	Oboe Concerto in E♭ major	Mozart's authorship doubtful		
Anh.C 17.12	187	Anh. C 17.12	Divertimento No. 5 in C	spurious (by Leopold Mozart; arrangement of dances by Josef Starzer and Christoph Willibald Gluck)		
Anh.C 23.01	55	Anh. C 23.01	Violin Sonata in C	spurious (composer unknown)		
Anh.C 23.02	56	Anh. C 23.02	Violin Sonata in C	spurious (composer unknown)		
Anh.C 23.03	57	Anh. C 23.03	Violin Sonata in C	spurious (composer unknown)		
Anh.C 23.04	58	Anh. C 23.04	Violin Sonata in E♭	spurious (composer unknown)		
Anh.C 23.05	59	Anh. C 23.05	Violin Sonata in C	spurious (composer unknown)		
Anh.C 23.06	60	Anh. C 23.06	Violin Sonata in E minor	spurious (composer unknown)		
Anh.C 23.07	61	Anh. C 23.07	Violin Sonata in A	spurious (by Hermann Friedrich Raupach)		
498a	498a	Anh. C 25.04	Piano Sonata in B♭	spurious (by August Eberhard Müller); possibly 1st and 3rd movements authentic fragments (still doubtful)		
Anh.C 27.03	K^{2}. 528a	Anh. C 27.03	Fantasia in G minor for organ	1787? (incomplete)		
Anh.C 27.04		Anh. C 27.04	Romance in A♭	doubtful		
Anh.C 27.10		Anh. C 27.10	Fugue in E (probably by August Alexander Klengel)	incomplete		
626b/01			Four sketch leaves (lost)			
626b/03,01			Sketch leaf (doubtful, lost)			
626b/03,02			Sketch leaf (doubtful, lost)			
626b/03,03			Sketch leaf			
626b/05			"Musique" (lost)			
626b/15			Untitled (lost)			
626b/22			"Fragment of a duetto" (lost)			
626b/22			"Fragment of a duetto" (lost)			
626b/49			"Marcia" (lost)			
626b/50			"Sketch leaf" (lost)			
626b/51			"A few bars of music" (lost)			
626b/52			"Musical manuscript" (lost)			
626b/53			"Viola part for a contradance" (lost)			
626b/55			"Autograph musical manuscript" (lost)			
626b/56			"Autograph musical manuscript" (lost)			
627			Clavier concerto movement (lost)	9 June 1763	7	Salzburg
628			Divertimento in C for piano four hands (lost)	1764–1765	8–9	London
629			Two piano pieces (second is a fragment)	1765	9	
630			Violin Sonata in D major (doubtful)	1766	10	
631			Arias for voice and orchestra (lost)	1765–1766	9–10	London, The Hague
632			Instrumental piece in C (doubtful)	1765–1766	9–10	
633			Aria "Quel destrier che all'albergo è vicino" (doubtful, lost)	1765–1766	9–10	London, The Hague
634			Polonaise in F (doubtful)	1767	11	
635			Piano Piece in G (fragment, doubtful)	1767	11	Salzburg
636			Concerto movement in G (doubtful)	1767	11	Salzburg
637			Song "Oragna figata fa marina gamina fa" for 1 or 2 voices (fragment)	1766	10	
638			Instrumental piece in G♯ minor for orchestra	1766	10	
639			Piece for Maximilian III Joseph, Elector of Bavaria (lost)	9 November 1766	10	
640			Solos for violin (lost)	1766 – September 1768	10–12	
641			Solos for viola da gamba (lost)	1766 – September 1768	10–12	
642			Aria for Nepomucena Wolff (lost)	1767	11	Olomouc
643			Symphonies (lost)	1768	12	
644			Arias (lost)	July 1768	12	Vienna
645			Six trios for two violins and cello (lost)	September 1768	12	
646			Aria "Cara, se le mie pene" for soprano and orchestra	1769	13	
647			Aria in D for soprano and orchestra (fragment)	1769	13	
648			Serenade in C Ganz kleine Nachtmusik for two violins and bass	1766–1769	10–13	
649			Piano piece in C (doubtful)	1769	13	
650			Allegro in C for clavier (doubtful)	1769	13	
651			Two Latin motets for soprano and orchestra (lost)	February 1770	14	Milan
652			Motet "Venti, fulgura, procellae" for soprano and orchestra (doubtful)	1770–1780	14–24	Milan
653			Cassation in C (lost)	1764 – September 1771	8–15	
654			Offertory "O supremum coeli Numen" (doubtful)	1771	15	
655			Two Church Sonatas in D and G (lost)	1771	15	Salzburg
656			Piano piece in C (fragment)	1771	15	
657			Nine piano pieces (doubtful)	7 September 1771	15	Milan
658	Anh. 207	Anh. C 27.06	Ballet for "Ascanio in Alba" K. 111 (fragment, doubtful)	1771	15	Milan
659	Anh. 207	Anh. C 27.06	Twelve variations for clavier (doubtful)	1771	15	Milan
660			Fugue in D minor for clavier (fragment)	1771–1773	15–17	Salzburg
661			Four minuets for dance ensemble (fourth is a fragment)	June 1772	16	Salzburg
662			Twelve songs for voice and "Harmoniale" (doubtful)	1774	18	Salzburg or Vienna
663			Orchestral piece in E♭ (fragment)	1773	17	
664			Melodic notation in B♭, probably for dance ensemble "Le matelot" (fragment)	1773	17	Salzburg
665			Trio in C	1773	17	
666	KV^{3} Anh. 223c	Anh. A 50	Divertimento in D for two solo violins and orchestra (fragment)	1773–1775	17–19	
667			Recitative "Campagne amene" for soprano and orchestra (for K. 208 No. 3)	1775	19	Salzburg
668			Operetta (lost)	19 February 1776	20	Salzburg
669			Vocal movement in C	1776	20	Salzburg
670			Overture in D (fragment)	1776	20	Salzburg
671			Modulating Prelude (F-e)	1776–1777	20–21	
672			Antiphon "Alma Redemptoris Mater" in F (lost)	23 September 1777	21	Salzburg
673			Flute Concerto (lost or unrealised)	1777–1778	21–22	Mannheim, Paris
674			Two dance movements in D for orchestra (fragment)	1778	22	Paris
675			Piece in B♭ for dance ensemble or orchestra (fragment)	1778	22	
676			March (lost)	1780	24	
677			Church Sonata in C (lost)	1780	24	
678			Cantata (lost or unrealised)	June–September 1781	25	
679			Instrumental piece in B♭ (probably for 12 winds and double bass; fragment)	1781	25	
680			String Quartet Movement in E (fragment)	1781	25	
681			Larghetto and Allegro in E♭ for 2 pianos (fragment completed by Maximilian Stadler)	1781–1783	25–27	
682			Instrumental piece in C (probably for dance ensemble; fragment)	1782	26	
683			Duet "Ho un pensiero nel cervello" for soprano, tenor, and orchestra (fragment for "L'oca del Cairo", K. 422)	June–September 1783	27	
684			Rondo (fragment) and lost piece for "Pianoforte de l'harmonie parfaite" (doubtful)	1783 (up to November)	27	
685			Aria in B♭ for bass (fragment)	1783	27	
686			Trio (probably for 2 violins and cello) in C minor (fragment)	1783	27	
687			Trio movement (probably for 2 violins and cello) in C (fragment)	1783	27	
688			Violin sonata movement in C (fragment)	21 April 1784	28	
689			Aria for Margarethe Marchand (lost or unrealised)	21 July 1784	28	
690			Instrumental piece in G for piano or dance ensemble (fragment)	1784–1787	28–31	
691	K^{3}. Anh. 190a/[01]	626b/32 (1)	Melodic notation in F (fragment)	1784–1787	28–31	Vienna
692			Two Freemason songs (lost)	1785	29	
693			Orchestral piece in E minor (fragment)	1785	29	
694			Allegro in D for orchestra (fragment)	1785–1786	29–30	
695			Piano piece in C (fragment)	1785–1786	29–30	
696			Canon in E♭ for 3 sopranos and bass	1785	29	
697			Trio movement in C (fragment)	1785	29	
698			Theme in B♭ (fragment)	1785	29	
699	Anh. 24	626b/26	Duet "Ich nenne dich, ohn' es zu wissen" in B♭ for two voices (discant) and piano (fragment)	1785–1787	29–31	
700			"Giunse il momento alfine" – "Non tardar, amato bene" (fragment; predecessor of aria "Giunse alfin il momento – Deh vieni non tardar" from "Le nozze di Figaro", K. 492)	March–June 1786	30	
701			Melodic notation in C minor (fragment)	1785–1786	29–30	
702			Melodic notation in C minor (fragment)	1785–1786	29–30	
703			Instrumental piece in A♭ (fragment?)	1787	31	
704			Melodic notation in G minor (fragment)	1787	31	
705			Melodic notation in G (fragment)	1787	31	
706			Vocal movement in D minor (fragment, without text)	1787	31	Vienna
707			Credo in D (fragment)	1787	31	Vienna
708			Adagio in B minor for piano (fragment; predecessor of K. 540)	1788	32	
709			Melodic notation in C (probably for dance ensemble)	1785–1788	29–32	
710			Allegretto in B♭ (for piano or dance ensemble; fragment)	1785–1788	29–32	
711			Instrumental piece in B♭ (for piano or dance ensemble; fragment)	1787–1788	31–32	
712			Recitative "Ahi, cosa veggio!" for soprano and orchestra for aria K. 583 "Vado, ma dove? Oh Dei!" (doubtful)	October–November 1789	33	
713			Recitative "No, caro, fa coraggio e in me ti fida" for soprano and orchestra (doubtful)	July–August 1790	34	
714			Der Stein der Weisen: three contributions in Act II (doubtful)	1790 (by 11 September)	34	
715			Recitative "Ah, da me s'allontani" for soprano and orchestra for aria K. 419 "No, che non sei capace" (doubtful)	1791 (by 16 April)	35	
716			Duet "Pamina, wo bist du?" for tenor, bass, and orchestra for K. 620 "Die Zauberflöte" (probably a fragment; doubtful)	June–September 1791	35	
717			Aria "Se mai senti spirarti sul volto" (lost, doubtful)			
718			Adagio in F for string quartet (lost)	1781	25	
719			Two German dances in E and C for 2 violins and bass (fragments, doubtful)			
720	KV^{2} Anh. 109d	73x/03	Melodic notation in D	1772	16	Salzburg
721	KV^{3} Anh. 255a	Anh.C 8.16	Song, Prüfung des Küssens "Meine weise Mutter spricht" (lost, doubtful)	1784	28	

== Recordings ==
Recordings of the complete works of Mozart have been issued three times: on the occasion of the bicentenary of Mozart's death in 1991, Philips Classics Records released a 180-CD collection in 45 box sets and each CD in a jewel case, The Complete Mozart Edition, between 1990 and 1991. A selection of 25 CDs from this set, The Best of the Complete Mozart Edition, was published in 1995. The full selection was then released again in 17 box sets as The Compact Complete Mozart Edition in 2000. The Philips collection was made with recordings from world-renowned artists and is of high audio quality. On the occasion of Mozart's 250th birthday in 2006, Brilliant Classics released a single box with 170 CDs, plus one with liner notes to all works and the libretti to vocal works, Mozart Complete Edition. In 2016, for the 225th anniversary of Mozart's death, Decca Classics and Deutsche Grammophon in partnership with the International Mozarteum Foundation released a box of 200 CDs with 2 hardback books with a new Mozart biography by Cliff Eisen and a newly developed short Köchel guide. Mozart 225: The New Complete Edition contains premiere performances of previously lost compositions and never recorded fragments, as well as key works in alternative versions and recordings of legendary historic performances.

== See also ==
- List of compositions
  - Church sonatas
  - Concert arias, songs and canons
  - Masses
  - Operas
  - Piano concertos
  - Solo piano compositions
  - Symphonies
  - Symphonies of spurious or doubtful authenticity
