= Violin Sonata No. 19 (Mozart) =

- by W. A. Mozart
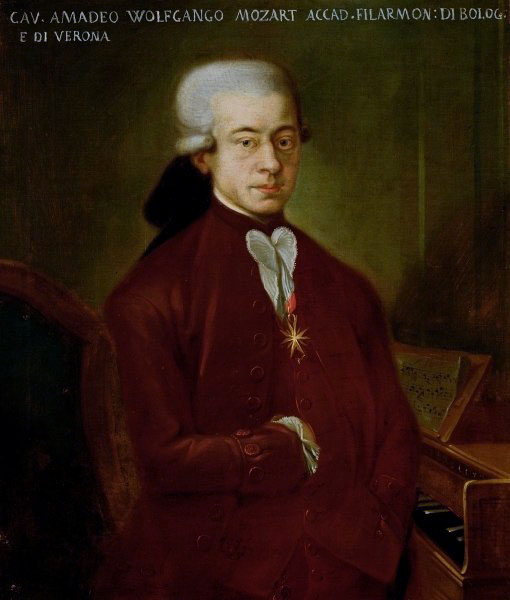
- 1777 Bologna portrait of Mozart
- Key: E♭ major
- Catalogue: K. 302/293b
- Composed: Mannheim, March 1778
- Dedication: Countess Palatine Elisabeth Auguste of Sulzbach
- Published: 1778
- Duration: c. 12 minutes
- Movements: 2
- Scoring: Violin and piano

Violin Sonata No. 19 in E♭ major (K. 302/293b) was composed by Wolfgang Amadeus Mozart in March 1778 in Mannheim, Germany and was first published in the same year as part of Mozart's Opus 1 collection, which was dedicated to Maria Elisabeth, Electress of the Palatinate and are consequently known as the Palatine Sonatas.

The work consists of two movements:

1. Allegro
2. Andante grazioso
