= Flute Quartet No. 4 (Mozart) =

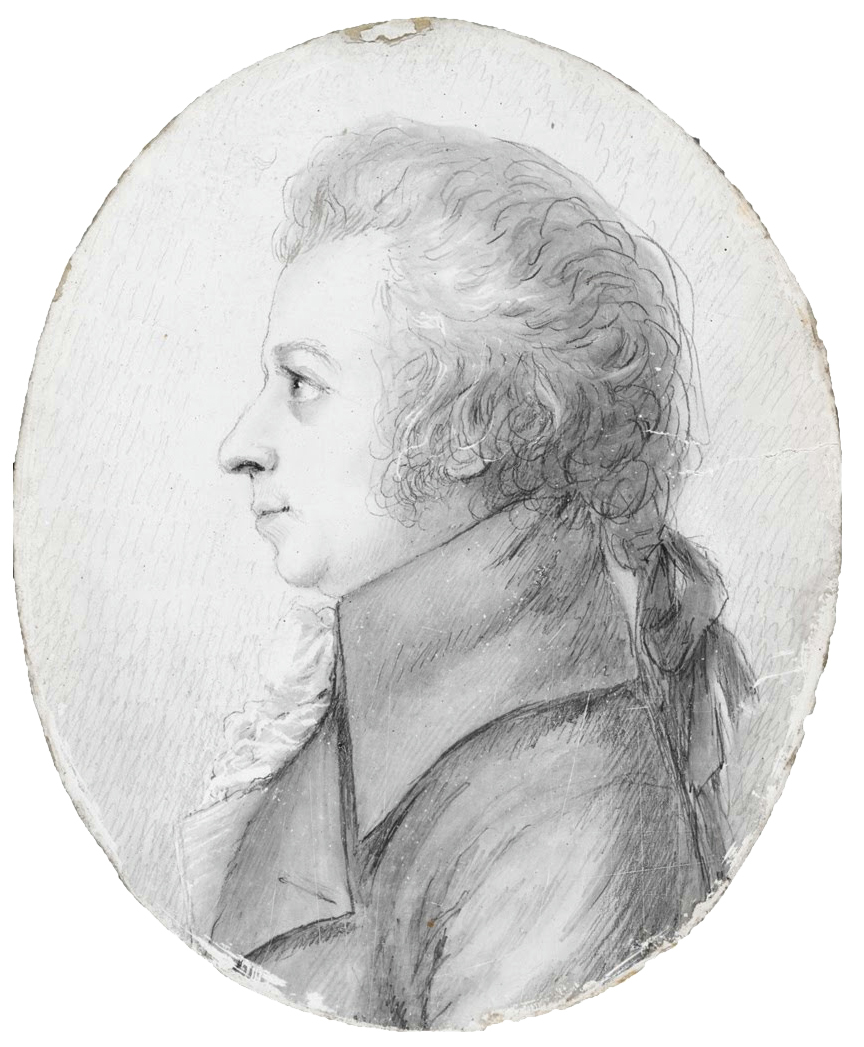
Stock's 1789 miniature of Mozart

The Flute Quartet No. 4 in A major, K. 298, by Wolfgang Amadeus Mozart is Mozart's final composition for flute quartet. Unlike the previous three quartets, written for the flutist Ferdinand De Jean, the Quartet in A is believed to have been written for recreational purposes, as opposed to on commission. The low Köchel number is misleading. The work is thought to have been written sometime in 1786 or 1787, only a few years before the composer's death.

It is in three movements:

1. Andante (Theme and variations, 2/2) – Allegretto (6/8)
2. Menuetto (D major, 3/4)
3. Rondeau: Allegretto grazioso (2/4)

The third movement is notable for its humorously detailed tempo indication: "Rondieaoux: Allegretto grazioso, ma non troppo presto, però non troppo adagio. Così-così—con molto garbo ed espressione" (or, translated, "A joke rondo: Allegretto grazioso, but not too fast, nor too slow. So-so—with great elegance and expression").

A typical performance lasts about 11 minutes.
