= Symphony No. 18 (Mozart) =

1772 symphony by W. A. Mozart

- by W. A. Mozart
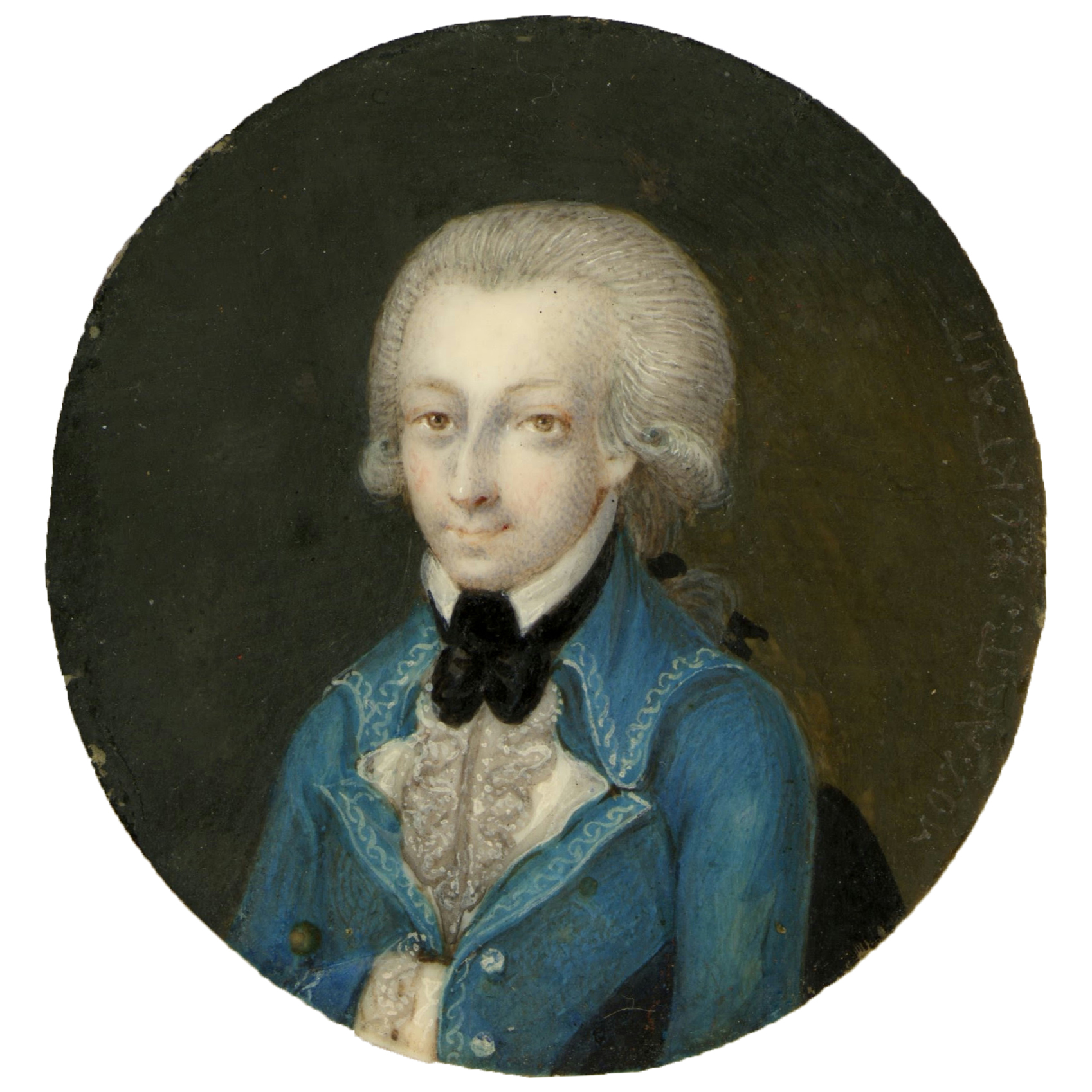
- Mozart in 1773, portrait by Martin Knoller
- Key: F major
- Catalogue: K. 130
- Composed: May 1772
- Duration: c. 21 minutes
- Movements: 4
- Scoring: Orchestra

Symphony No. 18 in F major, K. 130, was the third and last of three symphonies composed by Wolfgang Amadeus Mozart in May 1772, when he was sixteen years old.

== Structure ==
I. Allegro

II. Andantino grazioso

III. Menuetto

IV. Molto allegro

The symphony is scored for two flutes, four horns, and strings. The horns are tuned differently: two pairs each are in F and B♭ for the second movement, while they are in C and F for the remainder of the symphony. There are no oboes in this symphony; Mozart used flutes instead for the first time. He also used a second pair of horns throughout this work, which is a rarity in his oeuvre.

In this symphony and the others he wrote around this time, he writes for combinations of wind instruments that would not have been available to him – the official list of instrumentalists in the court orchestra included only two/three horns and no flutes. In the case of this symphony, Mozart may have been relying on the common practice where wind players could play several instruments, for example the oboists of the orchestra having flutes as a second instrument.

There are four movements:

1. Allegro, 4/4
2. Andantino grazioso, 3/8 in B♭ major
3. Menuetto – Trio, 3/4 (C major)
4. Molto allegro, 4/4
