= Piano Trio No. 3 (Mozart) =

1786 composition by W. A. Mozart

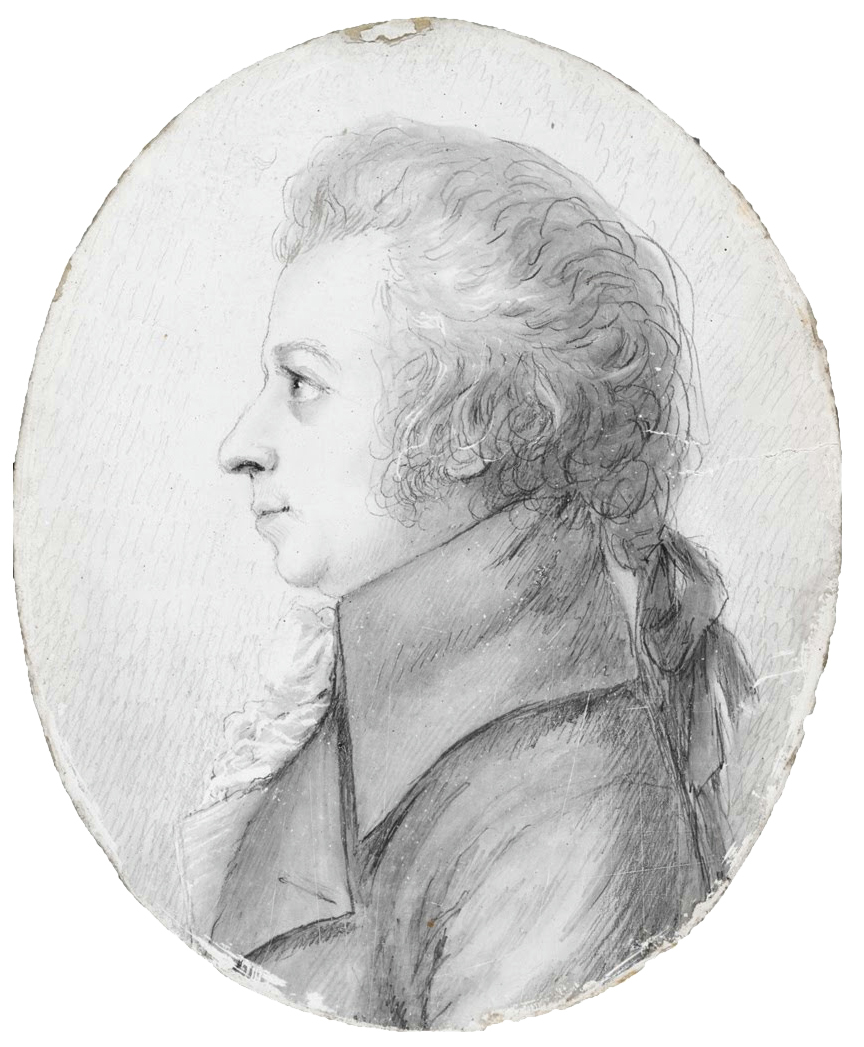
Dora Stock's 1789 miniature of Mozart

The Piano Trio No. 3 in B♭ major, K. 502, was written by Wolfgang Amadeus Mozart in 1786. It is scored for piano, violin and cello.

== Movements ==
The piano trio consists of three movements:

1. Allegro
2. Larghetto in E♭ major
3. Allegretto
