= Kleiner Trauermarsch, K. 453a =

1784 piano composition by W. A. Mozart

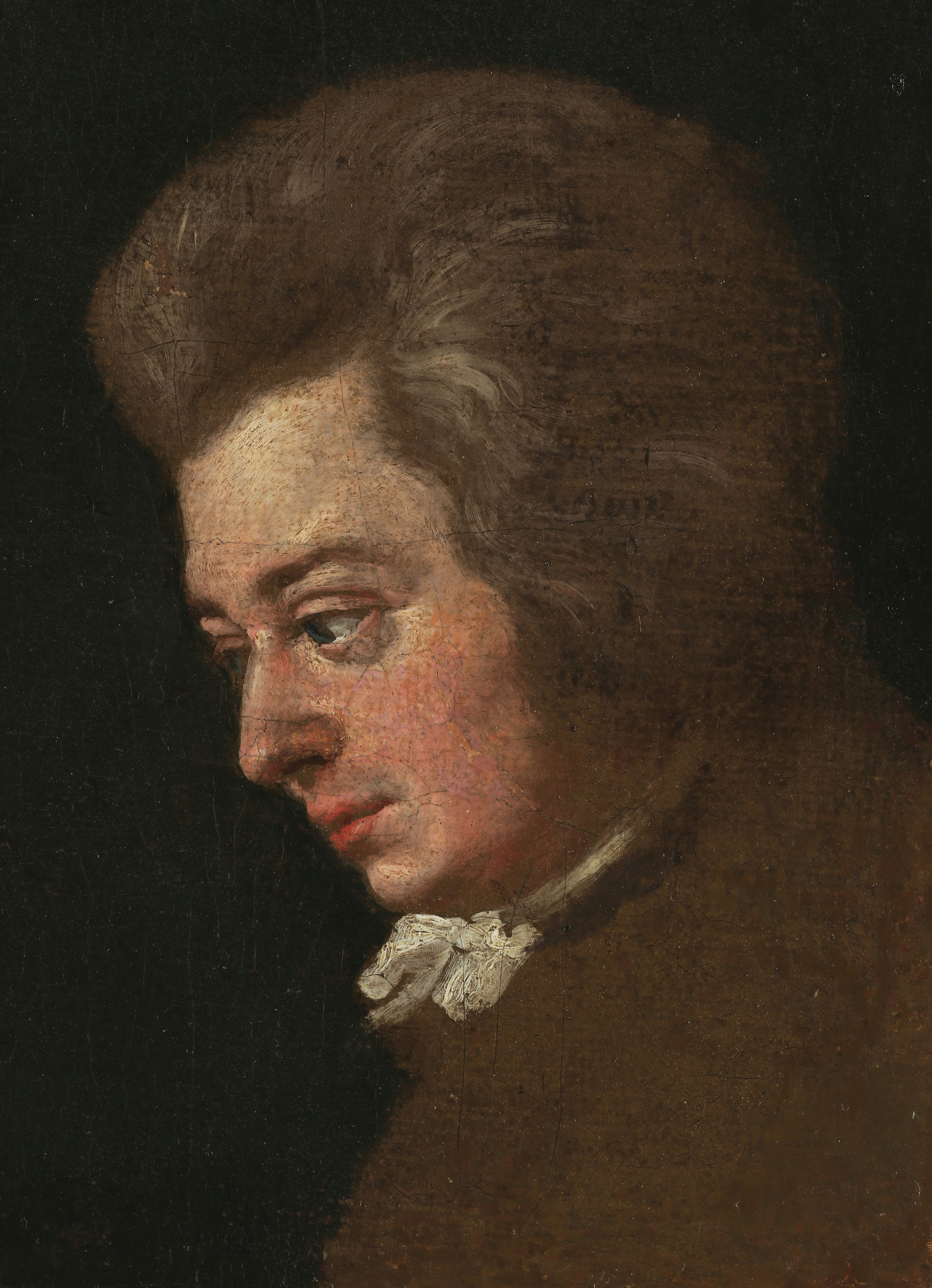
Detail of Lange's 1782–83 Mozart portrait

"Kleiner Trauermarsch" ("Little Funeral March") in C minor, K. 453a, is a keyboard work composed in 1784 by Wolfgang Amadeus Mozart, written in the notebook of his student Barbara Ployer.

The piece is subtitled Marche funebre del Sigr Maestro Contrappunto (Funeral March for Mr. Master Counterpoint); Mozart's grotesque exaggeration of conventional features of funeral marches mark it as a humorous parody. It consists of two sections of eight bars each, both repeated, and has no counterpoint. A performance takes about two minutes.

It was first published in 1930. The autograph has been lost in 1945.
