= Flute Quartet No. 3 (Mozart) =

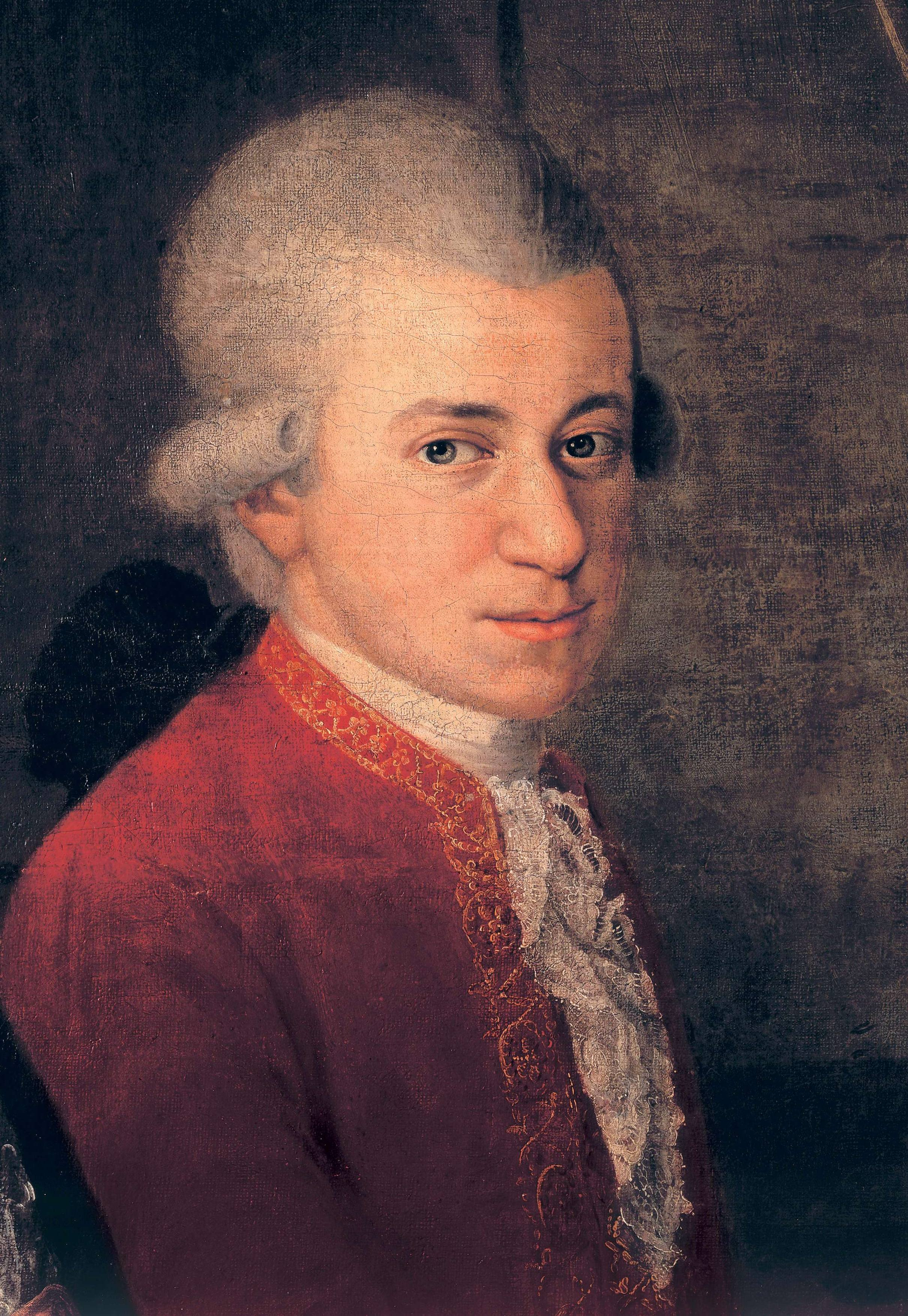
Detail of Wolfgang from the 1780–81 Portrait of the Mozart Family

Wolfgang Amadeus Mozart's Flute Quartet No. 3 in C major, K. Anh. 171/285b, is the last of three quartets for the amateur flautist Ferdinand De Jean. Mozart's manuscript designates this work for flute, violin, viola and cello. Despite following directly after the first two flute quartets in the Köchel catalogue, the Quartet in C was almost certainly written a few years later, likely sometime between the years 1781 to 1782.

The quartet is in two movements:

1. Allegro, 3/4
2. Andantino, Theme and variations

The second movement was adapted by Mozart from the sixth movement of his Serenade No. 10, K. 361.

A typical performance lasts roughly 15½ minutes.
