= Twelve Variations on "La belle Françoise" =

1778 composition by W. A. Mozart

- Theme and variations by Wolfgang Amadeus Mozart
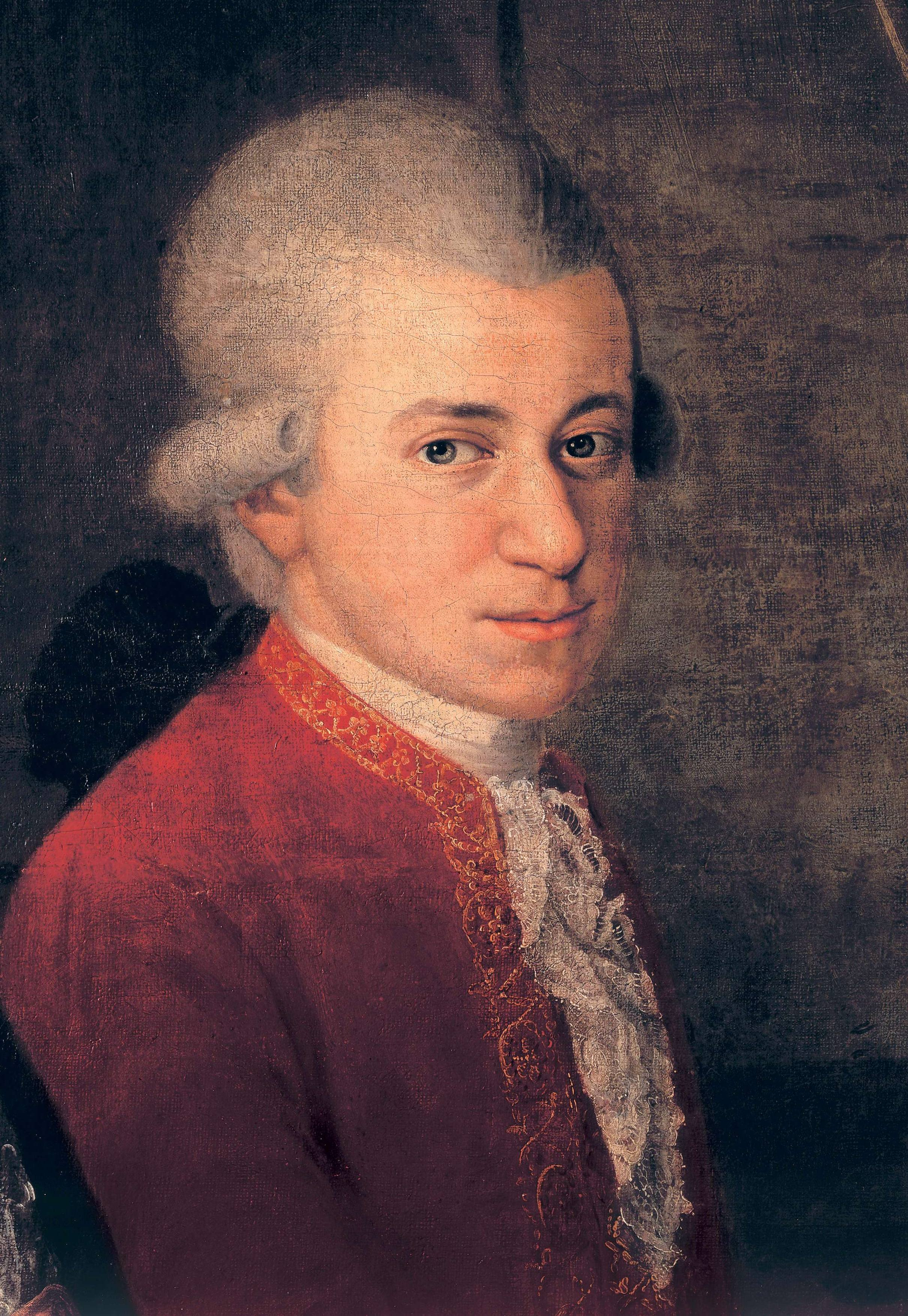
- Mozart around 1780
- Native name: Zwölf Variationen über "La belle Françoise"
- Key: E♭ major
- Catalogue: K. 353/300f
- Period: Classical music
- Form: Theme and variations
- Composed: 1778 – Paris (disputed)
- Published: 1781 – Vienna
- Duration: 16 minutes
- Movements: 1
- Scoring: Piano

Twelve Variations on "La belle Françoise" (German: Zwölf Variationen über "La belle Françoise") in E♭ major, K. 353/300f, is a set of theme and variations composed for piano by Wolfgang Amadeus Mozart. Written after the popular French tune "La belle Françoise", it was presumably completed when Mozart was 22 years old.

== Background ==
These variations were presumably composed by Mozart sometime between April and September 1778, during his stay in Paris. While little concrete evidence exists regarding the origin of the piece, it was later published in 1781 in Vienna, alongside other sets of variations and compositions based on French melodies—most notably the Twelve Variations on "Ah vous dirai-je, Maman". Because of this, the exact date of composition remains a subject of debate. Sets of variations such as the Twelve Variations were generally well-received and marketable to both publishers and the public, which explains why Mozart dedicated part of his time in the 1780s to writing works in this form. As of 2025, only fragments of the original autograph manuscript have survived, and the piece has been preserved primarily through subsequent publications and reprints.

== Structure ==
The piece is scored for piano and consists of fourteen sections: the theme itself and twelve variations, the last variation being followed by a coda which restates the theme. It has an approximate duration of sixteen minutes. It is in the key of E♭ major and both the theme and the vast majority of variations are in 6/8. Variation IX, the minore variation, is in E♭ minor. The sections can be presented as follows:

Structure
Variation	Title or tempo marking	Time signature	Bars
Theme	—	6/8	12
I	—	6/8	12
II	—	6/8	12
III	—	6/8	12
IV	—	6/8	12
V	—	6/8	12
VI	—	6/8	12
VII	—	6/8	12
VIII	—	6/8	12
IX	Minore	6/8	12
X	Maggiore	6/8	12
XI	Adagio	6/8	12
XII	Presto	2/4	29
Coda	Tempo primo	6/8	10
