= Flute Quartet No. 2 (Mozart) =

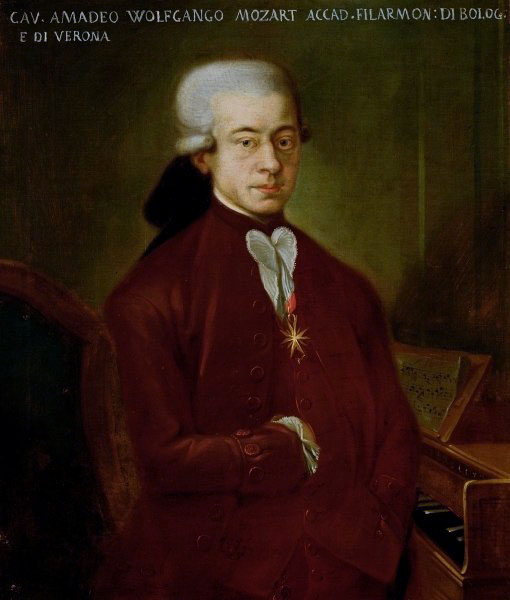
1777 portrait of Mozart

The Flute Quartet No. 2 in G major, K. 285a, by Wolfgang Amadeus Mozart is the second of three quartets for the amateur flautist Ferdinand De Jean, and was likely written between 1777 and 1778; indeed, the composition is listed directly after the Flute Quartet No. 1 in the Köchel catalogue.

The quartet is in two movements:

1. Andante, 3/4
2. Tempo di Menuetto, 3/8

A typical performance lasts a little under 12 minutes.
