= Symphony No. 13 (Mozart) =

1771 symphony by W. A. Mozart

- by W. A. Mozart
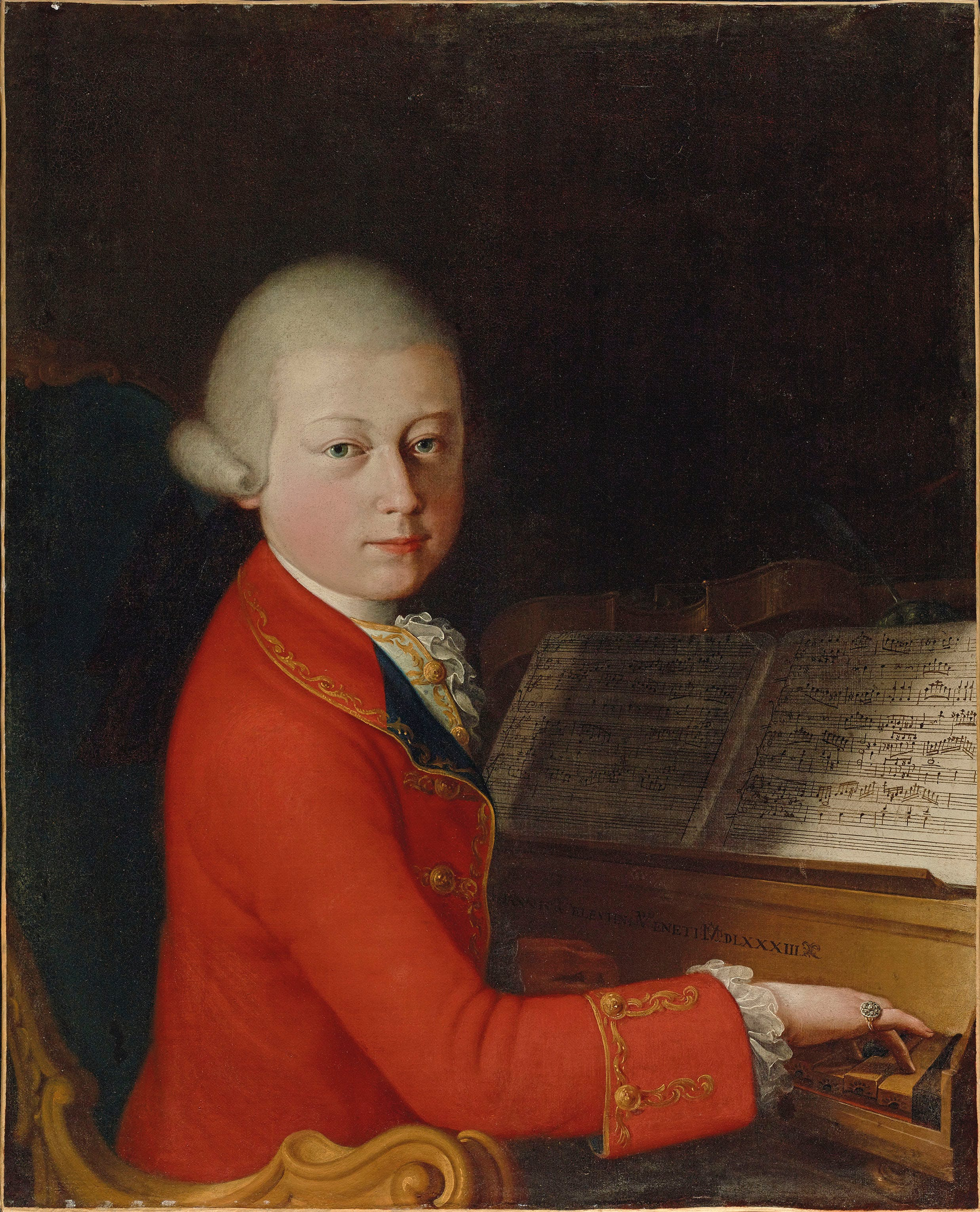
- 1770 Verona portrait of Mozart
- Key: F major
- Catalogue: K. 112
- Composed: Milan, 1771
- Duration: c. 14 minutes
- Movements: 4
- Scoring: Orchestra with continuo

Symphony No. 13 in F major, K. 112, by Wolfgang Amadeus Mozart, was written in Milan during his second journey to Italy in the autumn of 1771. Nicholas Kenyon describes Symphony No. 13 as the last in "conventional mode"—thereafter "we are in the beginnings of a different world."

Its probable first performance was at a concert given by Leopold and Wolfgang Mozart at the residence of Albert Michael von Mayr, on 22 or 23 November 1771. This concert may also have seen the premiere of Mozart's 12th symphony.

== Music ==
The symphony is orchestrated for 2 oboes, 2 horns, bassoon, strings, and continuo.

The symphony is in four movements, the second of which is scored for strings alone. The third movement minuet may have been written earlier, and then incorporated into the symphony—the autograph manuscript shows the minuet copied in Leopold's hand.

1. Allegro, 3/4
2. Andante, 2/4 (B♭ major)
3. Menuetto – Trio, 3/4 (C major)
4. Molto allegro, 3/8
