= Divertimento No. 17 (Mozart) =

Musical composition by W. A. Mozart composed in 1779–1780

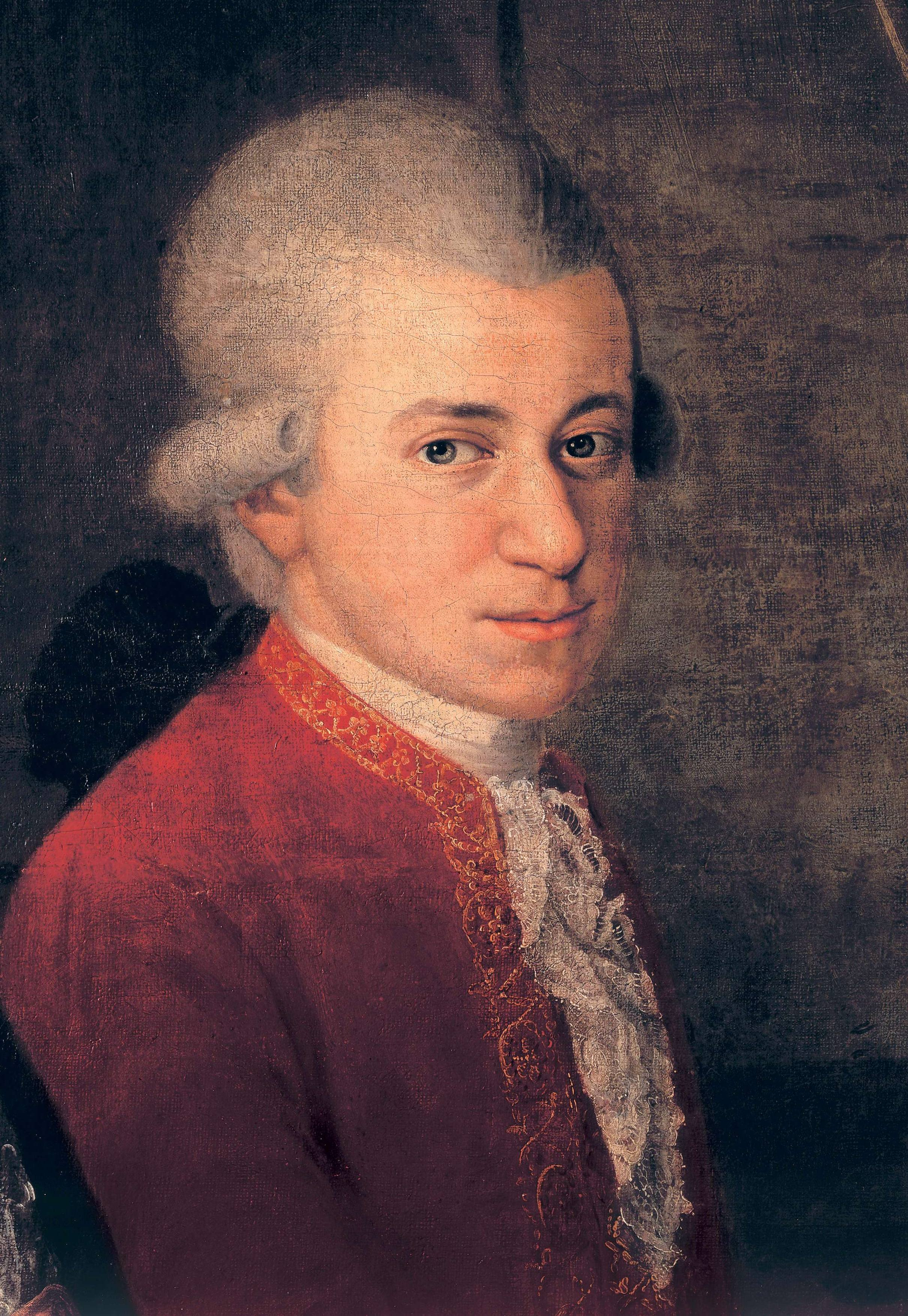
Detail of Wolfgang from the 1780–81 Portrait of the Mozart Family

The Divertimento No. 17 in D major, K. 334/320b, was composed by Wolfgang Amadeus Mozart between 1779 and 1780 and was possibly composed for commemorating the graduation of a close friend of Mozart's, Georg Sigismund Robinig, from his law studies at the University of Salzburg in 1780. Lasting about 42 minutes, it is the longest of the divertimenti by Mozart.

== Instrumentation ==
This divertimento is scored for two violins, viola, double bass, and two horns.

== Movements ==
This divertimento consists of six movements:

1. Allegro (in D major and in sonata form)
2. Tema con variazioni (Andante) (in D minor, theme and 6 variations, fourth variation in D major)
3. Menuetto – Trio (in D major and in compound ternary form, trio in G major)
4. Adagio (in A major and in sonata form)
5. Menuetto – Trio I – Trio II (in D major and in rondo form, where the first trio is in D minor and the second trio is in B minor)
6. Rondo (Allegro) (in D major and in sonata rondo form)

In Kurt Sanderling's recording of this piece, both the Adagio and the second Menuetto are omitted. In the recording with Florian Heyerick conducting the Kurpfälzisches Kammerorchester, Mannheim, part of the Rondo is omitted.
