= Violin Sonata No. 20 (Mozart) =

- by W. A. Mozart
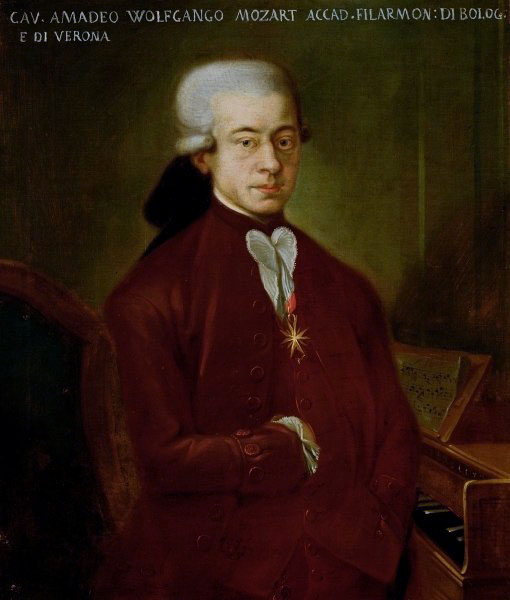
- 1777 Bologna portrait of Mozart
- Key: C major
- Catalogue: K. 303/293c
- Composed: Mannheim, March 1778
- Dedication: Countess Palatine Elisabeth Auguste of Sulzbach
- Published: 1778
- Duration: c. 13 minutes
- Movements: 2
- Scoring: Violin and piano

Violin Sonata No. 20 in C Major (K. 303/293c) was composed by Wolfgang Amadeus Mozart in March 1778 in Mannheim, Germany and was first published in the same year as part of Mozart's Opus 1 collection, which was dedicated to Maria Elisabeth, Electress of the Palatinate and are consequently known as the Palatine Sonatas.

The work consists of two movements:

1. Adagio – Allegro molto – Adagio – Allegro molto
2. Tempo di Menuetto
