= Serenade No. 5 (Mozart) =

1775 composition by W. A. Mozart

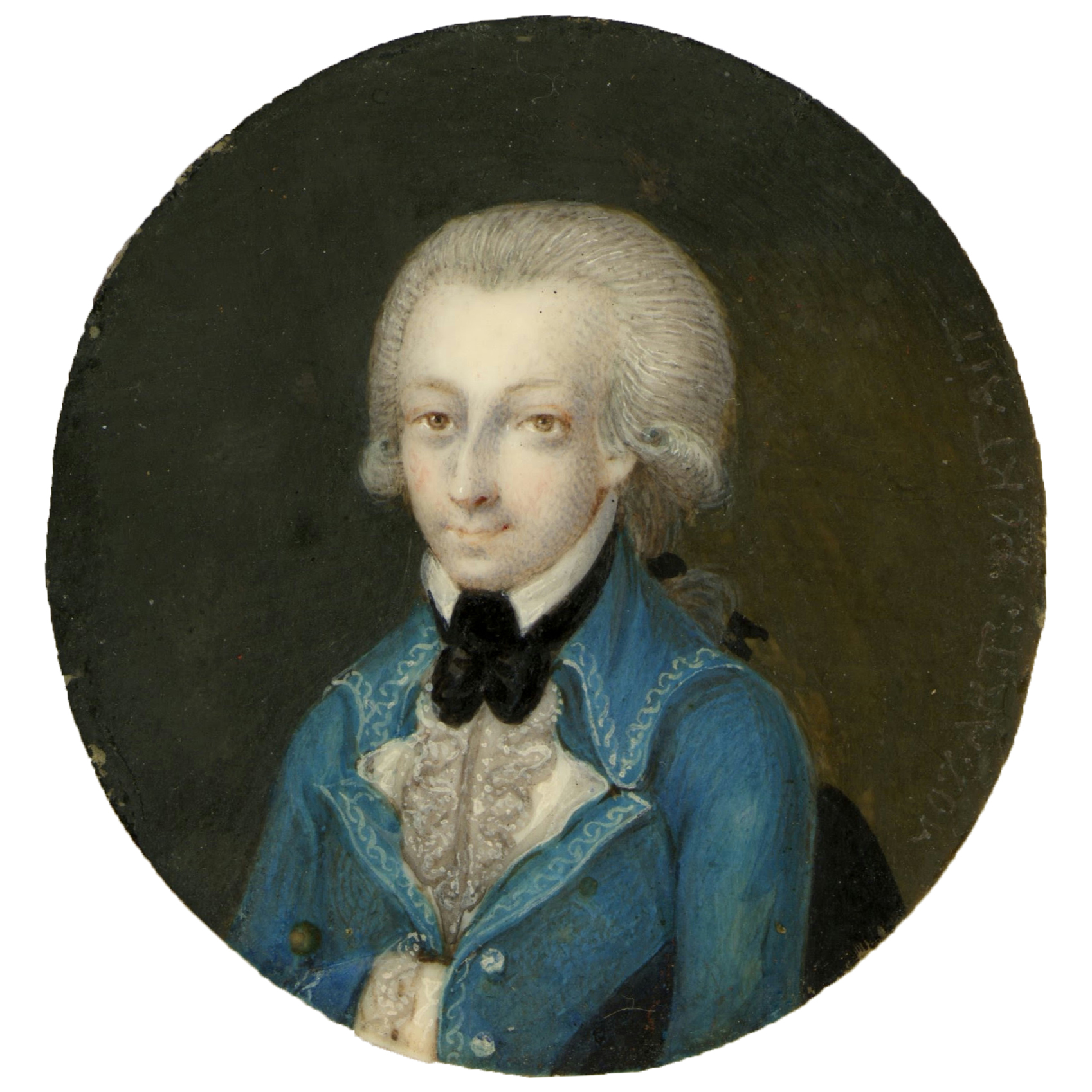
1773 miniature of Mozart

The Serenade No. 5 in D major, K. 204/213a was written on 5 August 1775 by Wolfgang Amadeus Mozart for ceremonies at the University of Salzburg. The work is very similar to the serenade K. 203, composed for Salzburg the previous summer.

== Structure ==
The serenade is scored for two oboes (doubling flutes), bassoon, two horns in D, A, and G, two trumpets in D, and strings. There are seven movements:

1. Allegro assai, 4/4
2. Andante moderato in A major, 3/4
3. Allegro in A major, 2/2
4. Menuetto & Trio, 3/4
5. [Andante] in G major, 2/4
6. Menuetto and Trio, 3/4
7. Andantino Grazioso, 2/4 – Allegro, 3/8

The March in D, K. 215/213b, was used as an introduction or exit for this work.

The second, third and fourth movements all feature the solo violin prominently, forming a three-movement violin concerto within the serenade. This is similar to the K. 203 serenade from the previous year. Mozart probably played the solo violin part himself.

Like most of his orchestral serenades, a symphony was arranged from a subset of the serenade's movements. The "Serenade Symphony" for this work consists of movements one, five, six and seven (the non-concerto movements).
