= Divertimento No. 11 (Mozart) =

1776 composition by W. A. Mozart

- Nannerl-Septett
- by W. A. Mozart
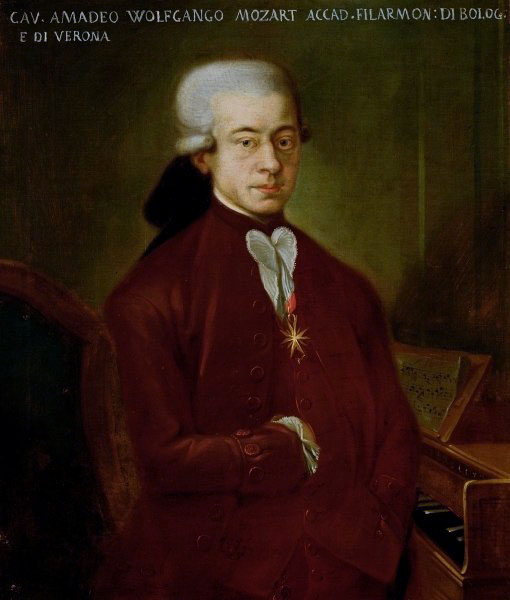
- 1777 portrait of Mozart
- Key: D major
- Catalogue: K. 251
- Composed: 1776
- Duration: c. 25-30 minutes
- Movements: 6
- Scoring: Oboe, two horns, two violins, viola, double bass

The Divertimento No. 11 in D major, K. 251, is a composition by Wolfgang Amadeus Mozart. It was written in July 1776 in Salzburg, possibly for the name day of Mozart's sister, Nannerl on July 26 or her birthday on July 30. The work is scored for oboe, two horns, two violins, viola and double bass.

== Movements ==
There are six movements:

1. Molto allegro,
2. Menuetto, 3/4
3. Andantino, 2/4 in A major
4. Menuetto: Tema con variazioni, 3/4
5. Rondo: Allegro assai,
6. Marcia alla francese,

The opening movement is in monothematic sonata form where instead of a true second subject in the dominant key of A major, the first subject appears in A minor. The trio of the first minuet is for strings only and the Andantino third movement is in rondo form. The fourth movement is an unusual mix of minuet and variation form. Here, the three variations serve as the "trios" with the minuet-theme returning da capo after each variation. The first variation features the solo oboe, the second features solo violin and in the third variation, the second violin makes runs underneath the theme. The horns are silent in all variations. The sixth movement is a rondo where the structure can be represented as "ABABA".
