= Violin Sonata No. 23 (Mozart) =

- by W. A. Mozart
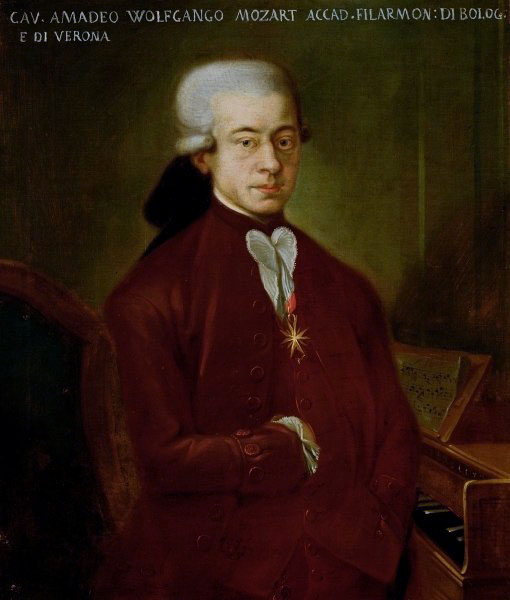
- 1777 Bologna portrait of Mozart
- Key: D major
- Catalogue: K. 306
- Composed: Paris, 1778
- Published: 1778
- Duration: c. 23 minutes
- Movements: 3
- Scoring: Violin and piano

Wolfgang Amadeus Mozart's Violin Sonata No. 23 in D Major, K. 306, was completed in 1778 in Paris.

The sonata contains three movements:

1. Allegro con spirito, 4/4
2. Andantino cantabile, 3/4 in G major
3. Allegretto—Allegro, 2/4 then 6/8

(Some sources and scores list the second movement as Andante cantabile.)
