= Violin Sonata in D major (attributed to Mozart) =

Late 18th-century composition

The Violin Sonata in D major, K. 630, is a composition for violin and piano (or harpsichord) published in England during the 18th century under the name of Wolfgang Amadeus Mozart. It is typical of many such works intended for use by amateur musicians in a domestic setting, with the attribution to a well known composer being used to boost sales. As with Mozart's earliest violin sonatas, the keyboard instrument is dominant.

== Background ==
The composition first appeared in an undated score published by J. Bland of London entitled "A favorite Sonata for the Piano Forte or Harpsichord, with an accompaniment for a Violin, Composed by W.A. Mozart".

Scholars have been unable to date the published score to earlier than 1780, which casts strong doubt on Mozart being the actual composer as his last visit to London was in the 1760s.

== Structure ==
The composition, which has a typical performance time of around seven and a half minutes, is in two movements:

1. Allegro
2. Rondo: Grazioso
