= List of compositions by Wolfgang Amadeus Mozart =

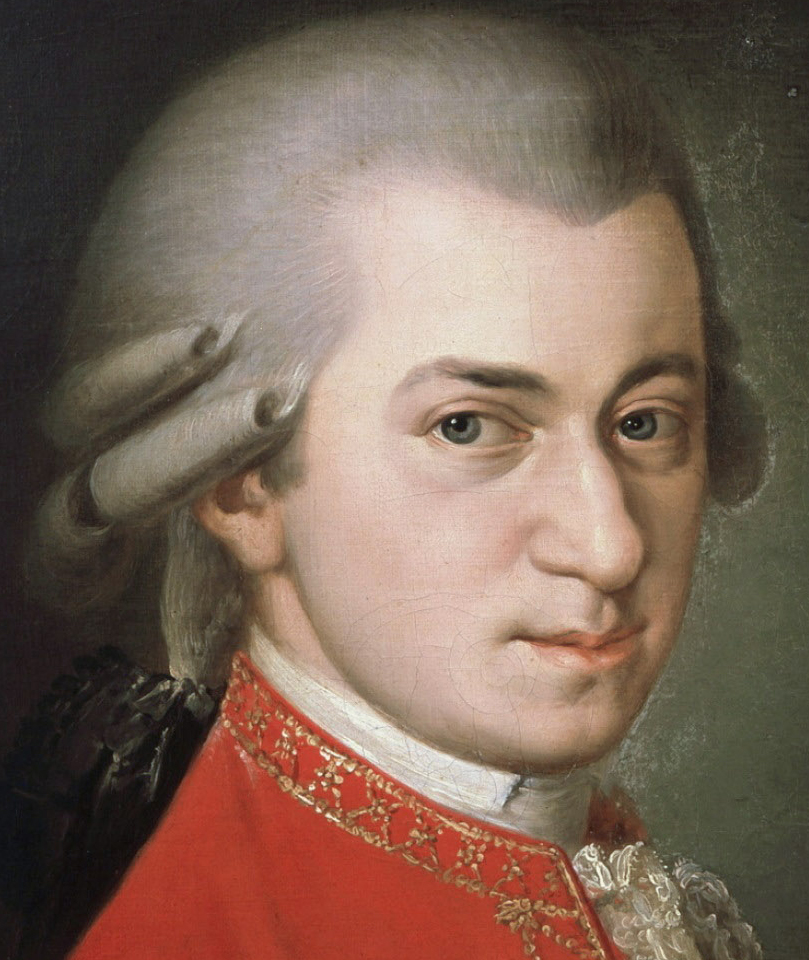
Wolfgang Amadeus Mozart, c. 1782-83

Wolfgang Amadeus Mozart (1756–1791) was a prolific and influential composer of the Classical period who wrote in many genres. Perhaps his best-admired works can be found within the categories of operas, piano concertos, piano sonatas, symphonies, string quartets, and string quintets. Mozart also wrote many violin sonatas; other forms of chamber music; violin concertos, and other concertos for one or more solo instruments; masses, and other religious music; organ music; masonic music; and numerous dances, marches, divertimenti, serenades, and other forms of light entertainment.

== How Mozart's compositions are listed ==
- The indication "K." or "KV" refers to Köchel Verzeichnis (Köchel catalogue), i.e. the (more or less) chronological catalogue of Mozart's works by Ludwig von Köchel. This catalogue has been amended several times, leading to ambiguity over some KV numbers (see e.g. Symphony No. 24 and Symphony No. 25, numbered K. 173dA and 173dB in the 6th edition).

The superscipt numbers in the tables (e.g. K^{6}) refer to catalogue edition numbers.

- The compositions listed below are grouped thematically, i.e. by type of composition.
- Only relatively few of Mozart's compositions have opus numbers, as not so many of his compositions were published during his lifetime, so numbering by opus number proves quite impractical for Mozart compositions.

== Sacred choral music ==
Mozart's sacred choral music consists of masses, litanies, vespers, psalms, church music, oratorios, cantatas, a Requiem and other shorter and fragmentary works. Beginning in 1768 and ending in 1791, his sacred works are considered some of the most important and influential ever written. Pulling away from the basis of the sacred works of Bach or Handel, which at the time of his later output (around 1780 to 1791) had gone out of fashion, his sacred works eventually resulted in the Requiem, which was left unfinished at his early death in 1791.

=== Masses (1768–1783) ===
K^{1}	K^{6}	Composition	Date	Location
139	47a	Missa solemnis in C minor, "Waisenhaus"	1768–1769	Vienna
49	47d	Missa brevis in G	October – November 1768	Vienna
65	61a	Missa brevis in D minor	14 January 1769	Salzburg
66	66	Mass in C, "Dominicus"	October 1769	Salzburg
140	Anh. 235d	Missa brevis in G, "Pastoral" (attribution uncertain)	1773	Salzburg
167	167	Mass in C, "Missa in honorem Sanctissimae Trinitatis"	June 1773	Salzburg
192	186f	Missa brevis in F	24 June 1774	Salzburg
194	186h	Missa brevis in D	8 August 1774	Salzburg
220	196b	Mass in C, "Spatzen"	1775 or 1776	Munich
262	246a	Missa longa in C	1776	Salzburg
257	257	Mass in C, "Credo"	1775	Salzburg
258	258	Mass in C, "Piccolomini"	1775–1777	Salzburg
259	259	Mass in C, "Organ Solo"	1775–1777	Salzburg
275	272b	Mass in B♭	23 September 1777	Salzburg
317	317	Mass in C, "Coronation Mass"	23 March 1779	Salzburg
337	337	Mass in C, "Solemnis"	March 1780	Salzburg
427	417a	Great Mass in C minor	July 1782 – October 1783	Vienna

=== Litanies (1771–1776) ===
K^{1}	K^{6}	Composition	Date	Location
109	74e	Litaniae Lauretanae B.M.V. in B♭	May 1771	Salzburg
125	125	Litaniae de venerabili altaris sacramento in B♭	March 1772	Salzburg
195	186d	Litaniae Lauretanae B.M.V. in D	May 1774	Salzburg
243	243	Litaniae de venerabili altaris sacramento in E♭	March 1776	Salzburg

=== Vespers and psalms (1774–1780) ===
K^{1}	K^{6}	Composition	Date	Location
193	186g	Dixit Dominus in C	July 1774	Salzburg
321	321	Vesperae solennes de Dominica in C	1779	Salzburg
339	339	Vesperae solennes de Confessore in C	1780	Salzburg

=== Church music (1765–1791) ===
K^{1}	K^{6}	Composition	Date	Location
20	20	"God is Our Refuge" in G minor	July 1765	London
34	34	Offertory in C, "Scande coeli limina"	early 1767	Bavaria
47	47	Veni sancte Spiritus in C	Autumn 1768	Vienna
117	47b	Offertory in C, "Benedictus sit Deus"	October – November 1768	Vienna
141	66b	Te Deum in C	1769	Salzburg
143	73a	Recitative and aria for soprano; "Ergo interest"	February 1773	Salzburg
85	73s	Miserere in A minor	July – August 1770	Bologna
44	73u	Antiphon in A minor; "Cibavit eos"	1770	Bologna
86	73v	Antiphon in D minor; "Quaerite primum regnum Dei"	9 October 1770	Bologna
108	74d	Regina coeli in C	May 1771	Salzburg
72	74f	Offertorium in G; "Inter natos mulierum"	May – June 1771	Salzburg
127	127	Regina coeli in B♭	May 1772	Salzburg
165	158a	Motet for soprano in F; "Exsultate, jubilate"	January 1773	Milan
177	Anh. C3.09	Offertorium; "Sub exposito venerabili" (doubtful)		
198	Anh. C3.08	Offertorium; "Sub tuum praesidium" (doubtful)	1773	Salzburg
222	205a	Offertory in D minor; "Misericordias Domini"	January – February 1775	Munich
260	248a	Offertorium in D; "Venite populi"	June 1776	Salzburg
277	272a	Offertorium in F; "Alma Dei creatoris"	Summer – Autumn 1777	Salzburg
273	273	"Sancta Maria, mater Dei" in F	9 September 1777	Salzburg
276	321b	Regina coeli in C	1779	Salzburg
618	618	"Ave verum Corpus" in D	17 June 1791	Baden

=== Oratorios, hymns and cantatas (1767–1785) ===
K^{1}	K^{6}	Composition	Date	Location
35	35	Die Schuldigkeit des ersten Gebots	1767	Salzburg
42	35a	Grabmusik	1767	Salzburg
118	74c	La Betulia liberata	March – July 1771	Italy and Salzburg
142	Anh. C 3.04	Tantum Ergo in B♭		
146	317b	Aria for soprano; "Kommet her, ihr frechen Sünder"	March – April 1779	Salzburg
197	Anh. C 3.05	Tantum Ergo in D		
343	336c	"Zwei deutsche Kirchenlieder", O Gotteslamm, Als aus Ägypten Israel	1779	Salzburg
469	469	Davide penitente	13 March 1785	Vienna

=== Requiem (1791) ===
The Requiem in D minor was Mozart's last composition, written between October and December of 1791. It was left unfinished at his death on 5 December 1791, and after his burial on 6 December, Constanze asked Franz Xaver Süssmayr to complete the remainder of the work (from bar 9 of the "Lacrimosa" to the final "Communio)". Constanze originally asked Joseph Eybler, but he could not. It is thought that his respect for the late Mozart was too great. Eybler wrote out the existing parts that Mozart had written out prior to his death, and did not go beyond the end of the ninth bar of the "Lacrimosa". Eybler's autograph is the only score of the original version of the Requiem, ending at the ninth bar of the "Lacrimosa".

Süssmayr continued writing the Requiem on Mozart's manuscript, and so it was never specified where Mozart stopped and Süssmayr started. The version by Süssmayr is the most commonly recorded and performed version of the work, with the completed "Offertorium", "Sanctus", "Benedictus" and "Communio". Süssmayr made minor corrections to the "Domine Jesu" and "Hostias", but the "Sanctus" is the first movement entirely by him. The 20th century has seen the appearance of numerous alternative completions that are either trying to simply correct Süssmayr's shortcomings or going so far as eliminating as much of Süssmayr as possible.

K^{1}	K^{6}	Composition	Date	Location
626	626	Requiem in D minor	October–December 1791	Vienna

=== Fragments and unfinished works (1766–1791) ===
K^{9}	K^{1}	K^{6}	Composition	Date	Location
33	33	33	Kyrie in F	12 June 1766	Paris
89	89	73k	Kyrie in G	1772	Rome
90	90	90	Kyrie in D minor	1771–1772	Salzburg
Anh.H 10,01	223	166e	Hosanna in G	Summer 1773	Salzburg
166f	Anh. 18	166f	Kyrie in C (fragment)	1772	Salzburg
166g	Anh. 19	166g	Kyrie in D (fragment)	1772	Salzburg
91	Anh. 17	186i	Kyrie in D (by Reutter, completed by Franz Xaver Süssmayr)	1774	Salzburg
196a	Anh. 16	196a	Kyrie in G (fragment)	1787–1789	Munich
258a	Anh. 13	258a	Kyrie in C (fragment)	1787-1791	Vienna?
322	322	296a	Kyrie in E♭ (fragment; completed by M. Stadler)	early 1778	Mannheim
323	Anh. 15	323	Kyrie in C (fragment; completed by M. Stadler)	1779?	Salzburg
323a	Anh. 20	323a	Gloria in C (in conjunction with K. 323)	1779?	Salzburg
341	341	368a	Kyrie in D minor	1787–1791	Vienna
422a	Anh. 14	422a	Kyrie in D (fragment)	1787–1789	Salzburg

== Theatre music ==
=== Operas (1767–1791) ===
Mozart's operas, if Die Schuldigkeit des ersten Gebots, Zaide, L'oca del Cairo, Lo sposo deluso and Der Stein der Weisen are included, add up to 23 works. The works mentioned are sometimes excluded from lists of Mozart's operas due to their debatable form. Die Schuldigkeit des ersten Gebots is regarded as a "sacred drama", Zaide, L'oca del Cairo and Lo sposo deluso are unfinished, with only uncompleted fragments making up the latter, and Der Stein der Weisen is a collaborative work.

K^{1}	K^{6}	Composition	Period	Premiere date	Premiere location	Notes
38	38	Apollo et Hyacinthus	1767	13 May 1767	Great Hall, University of Salzburg	Latin intermezzo
51	46a	La finta semplice	1768	1 May 1769	Archbishop's Palace, Salzburg	Opera buffa. Originally composed in 1768, by the time Marco Coltellini had revised the libretto by Carlo Goldoni, the Mozarts were scheduled to leave Vienna, and so it received its premiere when they arrived back in Salzburg in 1769.
50	46b	Bastien und Bastienne	1768	2 October 1890	Architektenhaus, Berlin	Singspiel. Possibly premiered in Vienna, October 1768, in the garden of Dr. Franz Mesmer, but this is disputed. The first certified performance was on 2 October 1890 at the Architektenhaus, Wilhelmstraße 92 in Berlin
87	74a	Mitridate, re di Ponto	1770	26 December 1770	Teatro Regio Ducale, Milan	Opera seria. Libretto by Vittorio Amedeo Cigna-Santi, based on Racine's Mithridate.
111	111	Ascanio in Alba	1771	17 October 1771	Teatro Regio Ducale, Milan	Festa teatrale. Libretto by Giuseppe Parini. Commissioned by the Empress Maria Theresa for the marriage of her son, Archduke Ferdinand Karl, to Maria Beatrice d'Este on 15 October 1771.
126	126	Il sogno di Scipione	1771	1 May 1772 (possibly)	Archbishop's Palace, Salzburg	Azione teatrale. Libretto by Pietro Metastasio. Composed originally for Prince-Archbishop Sigismund von Schrattenbach, but he died before the work could be performed. Mozart then dedicated it to Schrattenbach's successor, Hieronymus Colloredo.
135	135	Lucio Silla	1772	26 December 1772	Teatro Regio Ducale, Milan	Opera seria. Libretto by Giovanni de Gamerra, revised by Metastasio.
196	196	La finta giardiniera	1774–1775	13 January 1775	Salvatortheater, Munich	Dramma giocoso. Libretto possibly by Giuseppe Petrosellini (disputed). Later converted into a German singspiel for performances in Vienna in 1790 (Die Gärtnerin aus Liebe). Until 1970, the only version of La finta giardiniera was the German one, until the Italian libretto and score was discovered.
208	208	Il re pastore	1775	23 April 1775	Archbishop's Palace, Salzburg	Serenata. Libretto by Metastasio, edited by Giambattista Varesco, based on Tasso's Aminta (1573). Commissioned for a visit by the Archduke Maximilian Francis of Austria to Salzburg.
345	336a	Thamos, König in Ägypten	1773 and 1779	4 April 1774	Theater am Kärntnertor, Vienna	Incidental music to a play written by Tobias Philipp von Gebler. The 1774 performance in Vienna consisted of only two choruses. The work in its entirety premiered sometime between 1779 and 1780 in Salzburg.
344	336b	Zaide	1779–1780	27 January 1866	Frankfurt	Singspiel (incomplete). Libretto by Johann Andreas Schachtner. Begun in Salzburg 1779, it was later abandoned in 1780. It was never performed in Mozart's lifetime, and received its premiere in Frankfurt on January 27, 1866, for the 110th Anniversary of Mozart's birth. Usually, either Mozart's Symphonies Nos. 26 or 32 are used as the overture, due to both works being in the Italian sinfonia form.
366	366	Idomeneo, re di Creta	1780–81	29 January 1781	Cuvilliés Theatre, Munich	Opera seria. Libretto by Giambattista Varesco. Mozart wrote a ballet to accompany the opera (K. 367), which he himself considered more of a Lullian divertissement. Regarded as Mozart's first "mature" opera, it is one of his earliest operas to still be regularly performed today.
384	384	Die Entführung aus dem Serail	1781–82	16 July 1782	Burgtheater, Vienna	Singspiel. Libretto by Gottlieb Stephanie, based on Bretzner's Belmont und Constanze, oder Die Entführung aus dem Serail.
422	422	L'oca del Cairo	1783	6 June 1867	Théâtre des Fantaisies-Parisiennes, Paris	Dramma giocoso (incomplete). Libretto by Giambattista Varesco. Begun in July 1783 but abandoned in October. Only seven numbers in the first act survive, plus some recitative and a sketch for a further aria. The existing music amounts to around 45 minutes.
430	424a	Lo sposo deluso	1783	6 June 1867	Théâtre des Fantaisies-Parisiennes, Paris	Opera buffa (incomplete). Libretto once attributed to Lorenzo da Ponte, but may have been by Giuseppe Petrosellini. Begun in 1780 and abandoned in 1783, only the overture and four numbers survive. It received its first stage performance on 6 June 1867 at the Théâtre des Fantaisies-Parisiennes, along with L'oca del Cairo.
486	486	Der Schauspieldirektor	1786	7 February 1786	Schönbrunn Palace, Vienna	Singspiel. Libretto by Gottlieb Stephanie. It was written as a musical entry in a competition, with Der Schauspieldirektor competing in the German category, against an Italian opera: Prima la musica e poi le parole by Antonio Salieri.
492	492	Le nozze di Figaro	1785–86	1 May 1786	Burgtheater, Vienna	Opera buffa. Libretto by Lorenzo da Ponte, based on Beaumarchais's La folle journée, ou le Mariage de Figaro.
527	527	Don Giovanni	1787	29 October 1787	Estates Theatre, Prague	Dramma giocoso. Libretto by Lorenzo da Ponte, based on Bertati's Don Giovanni Tenorio. For the Vienna premiere six months later, Mozart composed a new finale, in which the entire ensemble comes together in resolution ("Questo è il fin"). Mozart originally intended for the Commendatore scene ("Don Giovanni, a cenar teco m'invitasti") to end the opera, but the finale had to be changed due to the differing musical tastes between Prague and Vienna.
588	588	Così fan tutte	1789–90	26 January 1790	Burgtheater, Vienna	Dramma giocoso. Libretto by Lorenzo da Ponte. The subject of the opera did not offend Viennese audiences at the time, but during the 19th and 20th centuries the opera was considered risqué, vulgar and highly immoral. It was rarely performed, and when it was it was presented in a expurgated version.
625	592a	Der Stein der Weisen	1790	11 September 1790	Theater auf der Wieden, Vienna	Singspiel. Libretto by Emanuel Schikaneder. Pasticcio written by Mozart in collaboration with Johann Baptist Henneberg, Franz Xaver Gerl, Benedikt Schack and Emanuel Schikaneder. The only surviving part by Mozart is the duet "Nun, liebes Weibchen, ziehst mit mir", K. 625/592a. Everyone except Mozart contributed to act 1.
621	621	La clemenza di Tito	1791	6 September 1791	Estates Theatre, Prague	Opera seria. Libretto by Metastasio, revised by Caterino Mazzolà.
620	620	Die Zauberflöte	1791	30 September 1791	Theater auf der Wieden, Vienna	Singspiel. Libretto by Emanuel Schikaneder (who also played Papageno in the premiere).

=== Ballet music (1778–1783) ===
Mozart's small amount of ballet music are regarded as minor works, and a majority of them are either fragmented, incomplete or spurious. His only full-scale ballets are K. Anh. 10 and K. 367, the rest are all either small stand-alone works or incomplete works. The Gavotte in B♭, K. 300, isn't technically ballet music, but a dance, and so would nowadays be catalogued with Mozart's other dance music. But the Neue Mozart-Ausgabe regards it as ballet music.

K^{9}	K^{1}	K^{6}	Composition	Date	Location
299b	Anh. 10	299b	Les petits riens	11 July 1778	Paris
299c		299c	Ballet (fragment)	Summer 1778	Paris
320f	Anh. 103	299d	La Chasse in A (fragment)	Autumn 1778	Paris
300	300	300	Gavotte in B♭	1778	Paris
367	367	367	Ballet for Idomeneo	29 January 1781	Salzburg and Munich
446	446	416d	Music to a Pantomime (fragment)	February 1783	Vienna

=== Arias, songs and vocal ensembles (1765–1791) ===
Throughout Mozart's life, he wrote a large number of stand-alone arias and vocal ensembles. Most of these are concert arias, with some being alternative arias or ensembles to operas. His first work in this field was written in 1765 ("Va, dal furor portata") and the last in 1791 ("Io ti lascio, o cara, addio"). He also wrote two works for multiple vocalists (K. 479 and K. 480), either intended to be played alone or as an interjection ensemble in an operatic work. His other "secular" vocal works include canons and lieder.

K^{9}	K^{1}	K^{6}	Composition	Date	Location
21	21	19c	Aria for tenor; "Va, dal furor portata"	1765	London
23	23	23	Aria for soprano; "Conservati fedele"	October 1765	The Hague
36	36	33i	Recitative and aria for tenor; "Or che il dover...Tali e cotanti sono"	December 1766	Salzburg
70	70	61c	Recitative and aria for soprano; "A Berenice...Sol nascente"	28 February 1767	Salzburg
71	71	71	Aria for tenor; "Ah più tremar non voglio" (fragment)	early 1770	Salzburg
78	78	73b	Aria for soprano; "Per pietà, bell'idol mio"	1766	Milan
88	88	73c	Aria for soprano; "Fra cento affanni"	February – March 1770	Milan
79	79	73d	Recitative and aria for soprano; "O temerario arbace...Per quel paterno amplesso"	1766	Milan
646			Aria for soprano; "Cara, se le mie pene"	1769	Salzburg
77	77	73e	Recitative and aria for soprano; "Misero me...Misero pargoletto"	March 1770	Milan
82	82	73o	Aria for soprano; "Se ardire, e speranza"	25 April 1770	Rome
83	83	73p	Aria for soprano; "Se tutti i mali miei"	April – May 1770	Rome
74b		74b	Aria for soprano; "Non curo l'affetto"	early 1771	Milan or Pavia
209	209	209	Aria for tenor; "Si mostra la sorte"	19 May 1775	Salzburg
209a		209a	Aria for bass; "Un dente guasto e gelato" (fragment)	1775	Salzburg
210	210	210	Aria for tenor; "Con ossequio, con rispetto"	May 1775	Salzburg
217	217	217	Aria for soprano; "Voi avete un cor fedele"	26 October 1775	Salzburg
255	255	255	Recitative and aria for alto; "Ombra felice...Io ti lascio, e questo addio"	September 1776	Salzburg
256	256	256	Aria for tenor; "Clarice cara mia sposa"	September 1776	Salzburg
272	272	272	Recitative and aria for soprano; "Ah, lo previdi...Ah, t'invola agl'occhi miei"	August 1777	Salzburg
294	294	294	Recitative and aria for soprano; "Alcandro lo confesso...Non sò d'onde viene"	24 February 1778	Mannheim
295	295	295	Aria for tenor; "Se al labbro mio non credi"	27 February 1778	Mannheim
486	486a	295a	Recitative and aria for soprano; "Basta, vincesti...Ah, non lasciarmi, no"	27 February 1778	Mannheim
316	316	300b	Recitative and aria for soprano; "Popoli di Tessaglia!...Io non chiedo"	8 January 1779	Mannheim
368	368	368	Recitative and aria for soprano; "Ma che vi fece, o stelle...Sperai vicino il lido"	January 1781	Munich
369	369	369	Recitative and aria for soprano; "Misera, dove son!...Ah! non son io che parlo"	8 March 1781	Munich
374	374	374	Recitative and aria for soprano; "A questo seno deh vieni...Or che il cielo"	April 1781	Vienna
119	119	382h	Aria for soprano; "Der Liebe himmlisches Gefühl"	1782	Vienna
383	383	383	Aria for soprano; "Nehmt meinen Dank, ihr holden Gönner!"	10 April 1782	Vienna
440	440	383h	Aria for soprano; "In te spero, o sposo amato"	May 1782	Vienna?
416	416	416	Recitative and rondo for soprano; "Mia speranza adorata...Ah non sai"	8 January 1783	Vienna
435	435	416b	Aria for tenor; "Mußt' ich auch durch tausend Drachen" (sketch)	1783	Vienna
433	433	416c	Aria for bass; "Männer suchen stets zu naschen" (sketch)	1783	Vienna
178	178	417e	Aria for soprano; "Ah, spiegarti, oh Dio"	June 1783	Vienna?
418	418	418	Aria for soprano; "Vorrei spiegarvi, oh Dio!"	20 June 1783	Vienna
419	419	419	Aria for soprano; "No, no, che non sei capace"	June 1783	Vienna
420	420	420	Aria (rondo) for tenor; "Per pietà, non ricercate"	21 June 1783	Vienna
432	432	421a	Recitative and aria for bass; "Così dunque tradisci...Aspri rimorsi atroci"	1783	Vienna
431	431	425b	Recitative and aria for tenor; "Misero! O sogno...Aura, che intorno spiri"	December 1783	Vienna?
Anh.A 36	152	210a	Vocal piece for soprano and piano; "Ridente la calma" (arranged from J. Mysliveček)	ca. 1785	Vienna
479	479	479	"Dite almeno in che mancai" (Score) for soprano, tenor and two basses, for La villanella rapita (1785)	5 November 1785	Vienna
480	480	480	"Mandina amabile" (Score) for soprano, tenor and bass, for La villanella rapita (1785)	21 November 1785	Vienna
434	434	480b	Aria for tenor and 2 basses; "Del gran regno delle amazzone"	End of 1785	Vienna
505	505	505	Recitative and aria (rondo) for soprano; "Ch'io mi scordi di te?...Non temer, amato bene"	26 December 1786	Vienna
512	512	512	Aria for bass; "Alcandro lo confesso"	19 March 1787	Vienna
513	513	513	Aria for bass; "Mentre ti lascio"	23 March 1787	Vienna
528	528	528	Recitative and aria for soprano; "Bella mia fiamma...Resta, oh cara"	3 November 1787	Prague
538	538	538	Aria for soprano; "Ah se in ciel, benigne stelle"	4 March 1788	Vienna
539	539	539	A German battle song for bass; "Ich möchte wohl der Kaiser sein"	5 March 1788	Vienna
541	541	541	Arietta for bass; "Un bacio di mano"	May 1788	Vienna
577	577	577	Rondo for soprano; "Al desio, di chi t'adora"	July 1789	Vienna
578	578	578	Aria for soprano; "Alma grande e nobil core"	August 1789	Vienna
580	580	580	Aria for soprano; "Schon lacht der holde Frühling"	17 September 1789	Vienna
582	582	582	Aria for soprano; "Chi sà, chi sà, qual sia"	October 1789	Vienna
583	583	583	Aria for soprano; "Vado, ma dove? oh Dei!"	October 1789	Vienna
612	612	612	Aria for bass; "Per questa bella mano"	8 March 1791	Vienna

== Orchestral works ==
=== Symphonies ===
Mozart's symphonic production covers a 24-year interval, from 1764 to 1788. According to recent investigations, Mozart wrote not just the 41 symphonies reported in traditional editions, but possibly over 60 complete works of this type. However, by convention, the original numbering has been retained, and so his last symphony is still known as "No. 41". Some of the symphonies (K. 297, 385, 550) were revised by the author after their first versions.

=== Piano concertos ===
Mozart's concertos for piano and orchestra are numbered from 1 to 27. The first four numbered concertos are early works. The movements of these concertos are arrangements of keyboard sonatas by various contemporary composers (Raupach, Honauer, Schobert, Eckart, C. P. E. Bach). There are also three unnumbered concertos, K. 107, which are adapted from piano sonatas by J. C. Bach. Concertos 7 and 10 are compositions for three and two pianos respectively. The remaining twenty-one, listed below, are original compositions for solo piano and orchestra. Among them, fifteen were written in the years from 1782 to 1786, while in the last five years Mozart wrote just two more piano concertos.

- Piano Concerto No. 5 in D major, K. 175 (1773)
- Piano Concerto No. 6 in B♭ major, K. 238 (1776)
- Piano Concerto No. 7 in F major for Three Pianos, "Lodron", K. 242 (1776)
- Piano Concerto No. 8 in C major, "Lützow", K. 246 (1776)
- Piano Concerto No. 9 in E♭ major, "Jenamy", K. 271 (1777)
- Piano Concerto No. 10 in E♭ major for Two Pianos, K. 365/316a (1779)
- Piano Concerto No. 11 in F major, K. 413/387a (1782-83)
- Piano Concerto No. 12 in A major, K. 414/385p (1782)
- Piano Concerto No. 13 in C major, K. 415/387b (1782-83)
- Piano Concerto No. 14 in E♭ major, K. 449 (1784)
- Piano Concerto No. 15 in B♭ major, K. 450 (1784)
- Piano Concerto No. 16 in D major, K. 451 (1784)
- Piano Concerto No. 17 in G major, K. 453 (1784)
- Piano Concerto No. 18 in B♭ major, K. 456 (1784)
- Piano Concerto No. 19 in F major, K. 459 (1784)
- Piano Concerto No. 20 in D minor, K. 466 (1785)
- Piano Concerto No. 21 in C major, K. 467 (1785)
- Piano Concerto No. 22 in E♭ major, K. 482 (1785)
- Piano Concerto No. 23 in A major, K. 488 (1786)
- Piano Concerto No. 24 in C minor, K. 491 (1786)
- Piano Concerto No. 25 in C major, K. 503 (1786)
- Piano Concerto No. 26 in D major, "Coronation", K. 537 (1788)
- Piano Concerto No. 27 in B♭ major, K. 595 (1791)

There are also two isolated rondos for piano and orchestra:

- Rondo for piano and orchestra in D major, K. 382 (1782)
- Rondo for piano and orchestra in A major, K. 386 (1782)

The early arrangements are as follows:

- Piano Concerto No. 1 in F major, K. 37 (1767)
- Piano Concerto No. 2 in B♭ major, K. 39 (1767)
- Piano Concerto No. 3 in D major, K. 40 (1767)
- Piano Concerto No. 4 in G major, K. 41 (1767)
- Three Piano Concertos in D major, G major and E♭ major, K. 107 (1771 or 1765)

=== Violin concertos ===
Mozart's five violin concertos were written in Salzburg around 1775, except the first around 1773. They are notable for the beauty of their melodies and the skillful use of the expressive and technical characteristics of the instrument, though Mozart likely never went through all the violin possibilities that others (e.g. Beethoven and Brahms) did after him. (Alfred Einstein notes that the violin concerto-like sections in the serenades are more virtuosic than in the works titled Violin Concertos.)

- Violin Concerto No. 1 in B♭ major, K. 207 (1773)
- Violin Concerto No. 2 in D major, K. 211 (1775)
- Violin Concerto No. 3 in G major, "Straßburg", K. 216 (1775)
- Violin Concerto No. 4 in D major, K. 218 (1775)
- Violin Concerto No. 5 in A major, "Turkish", K. 219 (1775)

Mozart also wrote a concertone for two violins and orchestra, an adagio and two stand-alone rondos for violin and orchestra.

- Concertone for two Violins and Orchestra in C major, K. 190/186E (1774)
- Adagio for violin and orchestra in E major, K. 261 (1776)
- Rondo for violin and orchestra in B♭ major, K. 269/261a (between 1775 and 1777)
- Rondo for violin and orchestra in C major, K. 373 (1781)

In addition, there are three works that are spuriously attributed to Mozart.

- Violin Concerto in E♭ major, K. 268/365b/Anh. C 14.04 ("No. 6") (1780) (attributed to Johann Friedrich Eck)
- Violin Concerto in D major, "Kolb", K. 271a/271i ("No. 7") (1777) (doubtful)
- Violin Concerto in D major, "Adélaïde", K. Anh. 294a/Anh. C 14.05 (1933) (actually written by Marius Casadesus)

=== Horn concertos ===
Arguably the most widely played concertos for horn, the four Horn Concertos are a major part of most professional horn players' repertoire. They were written for Mozart's lifelong friend Joseph Leutgeb. The concertos (especially the fourth) were written as virtuoso vehicles that allow the soloist to show a variety of abilities on the valveless horns of Mozart's day.

The Horn Concertos are characterized by an elegant and humorous dialogue between the soloist and the orchestra. Many of the autographs contain jokes aimed at the dedicatee.

- Horn Concerto No. 1 in D major, K. 412 (1791, unfinished at Mozart's death)
- Horn Concerto No. 2 in E♭ major, K. 417 (1783)
- Horn Concerto No. 3 in E♭ major, K. 447 (c. 1784–7)
- Horn Concerto No. 4 in E♭ major, K. 495 (1786)

There are some other unfinished Mozart works for horn and orchestra:

- Horn Concerto, K. 370b+371 in E♭ major (1781)
- Horn Concerto, K. 494a in E major (c. 1785–6)

=== Woodwind concertos ===
K. 299 (3rd movement, Rondeau allegro)
Concerto for Flute, Harp, and Orchestra

- Bassoon Concerto in B♭ major, K. 191 (1774)
- Concerto for Flute, Harp, and Orchestra in C major, K. 299 (1778)
- Oboe Concerto in C major, K. 314 (1777) (has come down to us as the second flute concerto, but was almost certainly an oboe concerto)
- Flute Concerto No. 1 in G major, K. 313 (1778)
- Flute Concerto No. 2 in D major, K. 314 (1778) (an arrangement of the above Oboe Concerto)
- Andante for flute and orchestra in C major, K. 315/285e (1778)
- Clarinet Concerto in A major, K. 622 (1791; originally was for basset horn and was in the key of G major)
- Bassoon Concerto in B♭ major, K. 230a/Anh. C 14.03 (discovered in a set of parts in The Hague and attributed to Mozart; authenticity widely doubted from the start. Most likely composed by François Devienne)
- Oboe Concerto in E♭ major, K. 294b/Anh. C 14.06 (doubtful authenticity)

Others

- Basset Horn Concerto in G major, K. 584b/621b (fragment; transcribed and finished to become the well-known clarinet concerto)
- Oboe Concerto in F major, K. 293/416f – Allegro (fragment)
- Flute Concerto, K. 673 (lost or unrealised)

=== Concertante symphonies ===
K. 364 (3rd movement, Presto)
Sinfonia Concertante for Violin, Viola and Orchestra

- Sinfonia Concertante for Violin, Viola and Orchestra in E♭ major, K. 364 (1779)
- Sinfonia Concertante for Oboe, Clarinet, Horn, Bassoon and Orchestra in E♭ major, K. 297b (Anh. 9 and later Anh. C 14.01) (probably spurious arrangement of lost Sinfonia Concertante for Flute, Oboe, Horn, Bassoon and Orchestra from 1778)

These were not Mozart's only attempts at the genre; another fragmentary work was also composed around the same time, though not completed.

- Sinfonia Concertante for Violin, Viola, Cello and Orchestra in A major, K. 320e (Anh. 104) (c. 1779, fragment)

=== Other concertos ===
- Concerto for Violin, Piano, and Orchestra in D major, K. 315f (Anh. 56) (1778, fragment)
- Concerto for Trumpet, K. 47c (1768, lost or unrealised)
- Cello Concerto, K. 206a (1775, lost or unrealised)

== Piano music ==
Mozart's earliest composition attempts begin with piano sonatas and other piano pieces, as this is the instrument on which his musical education took place. Almost everything that he wrote for piano was intended to be played by himself (or by his sister, also a proficient piano player). Examples of his earliest works are those found in Nannerl's Music Book. Between 1782 and 1786, Mozart wrote 20 works for piano solo (including sonatas, variations, fantasias, suites, fugues, rondo) and works for piano four hands and two pianos.

=== Dual piano/performer works ===
==== Piano four-hands ====
- Sonata in C major for keyboard four-hands, K. 19d (doubtful) (London, May 1765)
- Sonata in D major for piano four-hands, K. 381/123a (1772)
- Sonata in B♭ major for piano four-hands, K. 358/186c (1774)
- Sonata in F major for piano four-hands, K. 497 (Vienna, August 1786)
- Sonata in C major for piano four-hands, K. 521 (1787)
- Sonata in G major for piano four-hands, K. 357 (incomplete) (1786)
- Fugue in G minor, K. 401 (incomplete) (1782)
- Andante and 5 Variations in G major, K. 501 (1786)
- Adagio and Allegro in F minor for a mechanical organ, K. 594 (1790) (organ, composer's transcription)
- Fantasia in F minor, K. 608 (1791) (organ, composer's transcription)

Others

- Allegro in G major, K. 357/497a (1786-87; fragment)

==== Two pianos ====
- Sonata for Two Pianos in D major, K. 448/375a (1781)
- Fugue in C minor for Two Keyboards, K. 426 (1783) (transcribed in 1788 for string quartet as K. 546)
- Larghetto and Allegretto for Two Pianos in E♭ major, K. 681 (completed by Maximilian Stadler)

Others

- Allegro in C minor for Two Pianos, K.Anh. 44/426a (1783-86; fragment)

== Chamber music ==
=== Chamber music with piano ===
==== Violin music ====
Mozart also wrote sonatas for keyboard and violin. For the most part, these are keyboard-centric sonatas where the violin plays a more accompanying role. In later years, the role of the violin grew to not just a support to the other solo instrument, but to build a dialogue with it.

The 'Violin Sonatas', KV 10–15, are unique in that they include an ad lib. cello part along with the score for violin and keyboard. The Neue Mozart-Ausgabe (1966) therefore includes them along with the other keyboard trios, although the Köchel catalogue (K^{6}, 1964) lists them as normal violin sonatas. In his notes to the first complete recording of this edition, Gottfried Kraus defends the decision to classify them as piano trios on the basis that the treble part involves double stops and passages that are characteristic violin writing, and that the first edition included a separate part for the cellist, which makes it likely that Mozart had a piano trio in mind.

===== Violin sonatas =====
====== Childhood violin sonatas (1762–66) ======
- Violin Sonatas, KV 6–9 (1762-64)
  - Sonata No. 1 in C for Keyboard and Violin, K. 6 (1762-1764)
  - Sonata No. 2 in D for Keyboard and Violin, K. 7 (1763-1764)
  - Sonata No. 3 in B♭ for Keyboard and Violin, K. 8 (1763-1764)
  - Sonata No. 4 in G for Keyboard and Violin, K. 9 (1764)
- Violin Sonatas, KV 10–15 (1764)
  - Sonata No. 5 in B♭ for Keyboard with Violin (or Flute) and Cello, K. 10 (1764)
  - Sonata No. 6 in G for Keyboard with Violin (or Flute) and Cello, K. 11 (1764)
  - Sonata No. 7 in A for Keyboard with Violin (or Flute) and Cello, K. 12 (1764)
  - Sonata No. 8 in F for Keyboard with Violin (or Flute) and Cello, K. 13 (1764)
  - Sonata No. 9 in C for Keyboard with Violin (or Flute) and Cello, K. 14 (1764)
  - Sonata No. 10 in B♭ for Keyboard with Violin (or Flute) and Cello, K. 15 (1764)
- Violin Sonatas, KV 26–31 (1766)
  - Sonata No. 11 in E♭ for Keyboard and Violin, K. 26 (1766)
  - Sonata No. 12 in G for Keyboard and Violin, K. 27 (1766)
  - Sonata No. 13 in C for Keyboard and Violin, K. 28 (1766)
  - Sonata No. 14 in D for Keyboard and Violin, K. 29 (1766)
  - Sonata No. 15 in F for Keyboard and Violin, K. 30 (1766)
  - Sonata No. 16 in B♭ for Keyboard and Violin, K. 31 (1766)
- Sonata in D major for Keyboard and Violin, K. 630 (1766, doubtful)

====== Mature violin sonatas (1778–88) ======
- Violin Sonata No. 17 in C major, K. 296 (1778)
- Violin Sonata No. 18 in G major, K. 301 (1778)
- Violin Sonata No. 19 in E♭ major, K. 302 (1778)
- Violin Sonata No. 20 in C major, K. 303 (1778)
- Violin Sonata No. 21 in E minor, K. 304 (1778)
- Violin Sonata No. 22 in A major, K. 305 (1778)
- Violin Sonata No. 23 in D major, K. 306 (1778)
- Violin Sonata No. 24 in F major, K. 376 (1781)
- Violin Sonata No. 25 in F major, K. 377 (1781)
- Violin Sonata No. 26 in B♭ major, K. 378 (1779)
- Violin Sonata No. 27 in G major, K. 379 (1781)
- Violin Sonata No. 28 in E♭ major, K. 380 (1781)
- Violin Sonata No. 29 in A major, K. 402 (1782; fragment, completed by Maximilian Stadler)
- Violin Sonata No. 30 in C major, K. 403 (1782; fragment, completed by M. Stadler)
- Violin Sonata No. 31 in C major, K. 404 (1782; fragment)
- Violin Sonata No. 32 in B♭ major, K. 454 (1784)
- Violin Sonata No. 33 in E♭ major, K. 481 (1785)
- Violin Sonata No. 34 in B♭ major, K. 372 (1781; fragment, completed by M. Stadler)
- Violin Sonata No. 35 in A major, K. 526 (1787)
- Violin Sonata No. 36 in F major, K. 547 (1788)

===== Variations for violin and piano =====
- 12 Variations in G major on "La Bergère Célimène", K. 359 (1781)
- 6 Variations in G minor on "Hélas, j'ai perdu mon amant", K. 360 (1781)

==== Piano trios ====
- Piano Trio No. 1 in B♭ major (Divertimento), K. 254 (1776)
- Piano Trio No. 2 in G major, K. 496 (1786)
- Piano Trio No. 3 in B♭ major, K. 502 (1786)
- Piano Trio No. 4 in E major, K. 542 (1788)
- Piano Trio No. 5 in C major, K. 548 (1788)
- Piano Trio No. 6 in G major, K. 564 (1788)

Others

- Piano Trio in D minor, K. 442 (1785–88; fragment, completed by M. Stadler)
- Piano Trio in B♭ major, K.Anh. 51/501a (1786; fragment)
- Piano Trio in G major, K.Anh. 52/495a (1786; fragment)

==== Piano quartets ====
- Piano Quartets (piano, violin, viola, cello):
  - Piano Quartet No. 1 in G minor, K. 478 (1785)
  - Piano Quartet No. 2 in E♭ major, K. 493 (1786)

==== Other chamber music with piano ====
K. 452 (3rd movement, Allegretto)
Quintet for Piano and Winds

- Quintet for Piano and Winds (piano, oboe, clarinet, horn, bassoon) in E♭ major, K. 452 (1784)
- Trio for Clarinet, Viola and Piano in E♭ major, "Kegelstatt", K. 498 (1786)

Fragments

- Quintet for Piano and Winds (piano, oboe, clarinet, basset horn, bassoon) in B♭ major, K. Anh. 54/452a (1784; fragment)

=== Chamber music without piano ===
==== String duos ====
- Duo for Violin and Viola No. 1 in G major, K. 423 (1783)
- Duo for Violin and Viola No. 2 in B♭ major, K. 424 (1783)

==== String trios ====
- Trio for 2 Violins and Cello in B♭ major, K. 266/271f (1777)
- Divertimento for String Trio (violin, viola, and cello) in E♭ major, K. 563 (1788)
- Ganz kleine Nachtmusik for 2 violins and cello, K. 648 (mid to late 1760s)

Others

- Preludes and Fugues for Violin, Viola and Cello, K. 404a (1782)
- Trio for Violin, Viola and Cello in G major, K. Anh. 66/562e (1788, fragment)

==== String quartets ====
- String Quartet No. 1 in G major, "Lodi", K. 80/73f (1770)
- Milanese Quartets, K. 155–160 (1772–1773)

This cycle, in three movements, is interesting as far as these works can be considered precursors of the later—more complete—string quartets.
- String Quartet No. 2 in D major, K. 155/134a (1772)
- String Quartet No. 3 in G major, K. 156/134b (1772)
- String Quartet No. 4 in C major, K. 157 (1772–73)
- String Quartet No. 5 in F major, K. 158 (1772–73)
- String Quartet No. 6 in B♭ major, K. 159 (1773)
- String Quartet No. 7 in E♭ major, K. 160/159a (1773)

- Viennese Quartets, K. 168–173 (1773)

Much more stylistically developed. In Vienna Mozart is believed to have heard the op. 17 and op. 20 quartets of Joseph Haydn, and had received from them a deep impression.
- String Quartet No. 8 in F major, K. 168 (1773)
- String Quartet No. 9 in A major, K. 169 (1773)
- String Quartet No. 10 in C major, K. 170 (1773)
- String Quartet No. 11 in E♭ major, K. 171 (1773)
- String Quartet No. 12 in B♭ major, K. 172 (1773)
- String Quartet No. 13 in D minor, K. 173 (1773)

- Haydn Quartets, K. 387, 421, 428, 458, 464, 465, Op. 10 (1782–1785)

Mozart returned to the quartet in the early 1780s after he had moved to Vienna, met Haydn in person, and developed a friendship with the older composer. Haydn had just published his set of six quartets, Op. 33, which are thought to have been a stimulus to Mozart in returning to the genre. These quartets are often regarded as among the pinnacles of the genre.
- String Quartet No. 14 in G major, "Spring", K. 387 (1782)
- String Quartet No. 15 in D minor, K. 421/417b (1783)
- String Quartet No. 16 in E♭ major, K. 428/421b (1783)
- String Quartet No. 17 in B♭ major, "The Hunt", K. 458 (1784)
- String Quartet No. 18 in A major, K. 464 (1785)
- String Quartet No. 19 in C major, "Dissonance", K. 465 (1785)

- String Quartet No. 20 in D major, "Hoffmeister", K. 499 (1786)

This work was published by (dedicated to?) Franz Anton Hoffmeister, as well as the Prussian Quartets.

- Prussian Quartets, K. 575, 589, 590, Op. 18 (1789–1790)

Mozart's last three quartets, dedicated to the King of Prussia, Friedrich Wilhelm II, are noted for the cantabile character of the parts for cello (the instrument played by the king himself), the sweetness of sounds and the equilibrium among the different instruments.
- String Quartet No. 21 in D major, K. 575 (1789) “Prussian No. 1”
- String Quartet No. 22 in B♭ major, K. 589 (1790) “Prussian No. 2”
- String Quartet No. 23 in F major, K. 590 (1790) “Prussian No. 3”

Others

- Fugues for 2 Violins, Viola and Cello, K. 405 (1782)
- Adagio and Fugue in C minor for 2 Violins, Viola and Cello, K. 546 (1788) (a transcription from Fugue in C minor for Two Keyboards, K. 426)
- Canon in C major for 2 Violins, Viola and Cello, K. Anh. 191/562c (1788, doubtful)
- String Quartet in E minor, K. 417d (1789; fragment)
- String Quartet in G minor, K. 587a (1789; fragment)
- String Quartet in E major, K. 680 (c. 1781–1782; fragment)
- Adagio for String Quartet in F, K. 718 (1781; lost)

==== String quintets ====
The string quintets (K. 174, 406, 515, 516, 593, 614), for two violins, two violas and cello. Charles Rosen wrote that "by general consent, Mozart's greatest achievement in chamber music is the group of string quintets with two violas."

- String Quintet No. 1 in B♭ major, K. 174 (1773)
- String Quintet No. 2 in C minor, K. 406 (516b) – This is a transcription for string quintet of the earlier Serenade for wind octet in C minor, K. 388. (1787)
- String Quintet No. 3 in C major, K. 515 (1787)
- String Quintet No. 4 in G minor, K. 516 (1787)
- String Quintet No. 5 in D major, K. 593 (1790)
- String Quintet No. 6 in E♭ major, K. 614 (1791)

Others

- String Quintet in B♭ major, K. 514a (fragment; 1787 or later)
- String Quintet in A minor, K. 515c+515a (fragment; 1791)

==== Other chamber music without piano ====
- Flute Quartets (flute, violin, viola, cello):
  - Flute Quartet No. 1 in D major K. 285 (1777–1778)
  - Flute Quartet No. 2 in G major K. 285a (1777–1778)
  - Flute Quartet No. 3 in C major K. Anh. 171/285b (1781–1782)
  - Flute Quartet No. 4 in A major K. 298 (1786–1787)
- Sonata for Bassoon and Violoncello in B♭ major, K. 292 (1775)
- Oboe Quartet (oboe, violin, viola, cello) in F major, K. 370 (1781)
- Horn Quintet (horn, violin, two violas, cello) in E♭ major, K. 407 (1782)
- Adagio in F major for two basset horns and bassoon, K. 410/484d (1785)
- Adagio in B♭ major for two clarinets and three basset horns, K. 411/484a (1785)
- 12 Duets for two horns in C major, K. 487 (1786, incorrectly published as being for basset horns)
- Clarinet Quintet (clarinet, two violins, viola, cello) in A major, K. 581 (1789)
- Adagio and Rondo for glass harmonica, flute, oboe, viola and cello, K. 617 (1791)
- Adagio in C major for Glass Harmonica, K. 356/617a (1791)
- Adagio in F major for clarinet and three basset horns, K.Anh. 93
- Adagio in F major for clarinet and three basset horns, K.Anh. 94
- Allegro assai in B♭ major for two clarinets and three horns, K.Anh. 95
- Allegro in B♭ major, K.Anh. 96 (for 2 oboes, 2 clarinets, 2 bassoons, and 2 horns)

Fragments

- Andante in B♭ major, K. 384B (fragment; for 2 oboes, 2 clarinets, 2 bassoons, and 2 horns)
- Allegro in C major for basset horn and ??, K. 484e (fragment; with undetermined instrumentation)
- Clarinet Quintet fragment in B♭ major, K. 516c/Anh. 91 – Allegro (for clarinet, 2 violins, viola, cello; 1787)
- Clarinet Quintet fragment in E♭ major, K. 516d – Andante (for clarinet, 2 violins, viola, cello; 1787)
- Clarinet Quintet fragment in E♭ major, K. 516e/Anh. 89 – Rondò (for clarinet, 2 violins, viola, cello; 1787)
- Clarinet Quintet fragment in F major, K. 580b/Anh. 90 – Allegro (for clarinet, basset horn, violin, viola and cello; 1789)

== Serenades, divertimenti, and other instrumental works ==
The production for instrumental ensembles includes several divertimenti, cassations, notturni, serenades, marches, dances, and a quodlibet, besides, of course, his symphonies. Mozart's production for orchestra is written for string ensembles (like the early Divertimenti K. 136–138), as well as for wind ensembles and the varied combinations of strings and winds.

=== Serenades ===
- Cassation in D major (Serenade No. 1), K. 100/62a (1769)
- 4 Contredanses in F major (Serenade No. 2), K. 101/250a (1776)
- Serenade No. 3 in D major, K. 185/167a "Antretter" (1773)
- Serenade No. 4 in D major, K. 203/189b "Colloredo" (1774)
- Serenade No. 5 in D major, K. 204/213a (1775)
- Serenade No. 6 in D major, K. 239 "Serenata Notturna" (1776)
- Serenade No. 7 in D major, K. 250/248b "Haffner" (1776)
- Notturno in D for Four Orchestras (Serenade No. 8), K. 286/269a (December 1776 or January 1777) (each of the four "orchestras" consists of 2 horns in D, violins I and II, viola and cello)
- Serenade No. 9 in D major, K. 320 "Posthorn" (1779)
- Serenade No. 10 for twelve winds and double bass in B♭ major, K. 361/370a "Gran Partita" (1781)
- Serenade No. 11 for winds in E♭ major, K. 375 (1781–82)
- Serenade No. 12 for winds in C minor, K. 388/384a "Nacht Musique" (1782)
- Serenade No. 13 for string quartet and double bass in G major, K. 525 "Eine kleine Nachtmusik" (1787)
- Serenade in C or Ganz kleine Nachtmusik for 2 violins and cello, K. 648 (mid to late 1760s)

=== Cassations ===
- Cassation in G major, K. 63 (1769)
- Cassation in B♭ major, K. 99/63a (1769; Probable first performance based on ensemble)
- Cassation in D major, K. 100/62a (alternative title: Serenade No. 1) (1769)

=== Divertimenti ===
- Divertimento No. 1 in E♭ major, K. 113 (1771)
- Divertimento No. 2 in D major, K. 131 (1772)
- Divertimento for string quartet or string orchestra in D major, K. 136/125a ("Salzburg Symphony No. 1") (1772)
- Divertimento for string quartet or string orchestra in B♭ major, K. 137/125b ("Salzburg Symphony No. 2") (1772)
- Divertimento for string quartet or string orchestra in F major, K. 138/125c ("Salzburg Symphony No. 3") (1772)
- Divertimento No. 3 for winds in E♭ major, K. 166/159d (1773)
- Divertimento No. 4 for winds in B♭ major, K. 186/159b (1773)
- Divertimento No. 5 for winds in C major, K. 187 (Anh. C 17.12) (1773) (spurious, by Leopold Mozart)
- Divertimento No. 6 for winds in C major, K. 188/240b (1773)
- Divertimento No. 7 in D major, K. 205/167A (1773)
- Divertimento No. 8 for winds in F major, K. 213 (1775)
- Divertimento No. 9 for winds in B♭ major, K. 240 (1776)
- Divertimento No. 10 in F major, K. 247 "Lodron Night Music No. 1" ("Lodronische Nachtmusik") (1776)
- Divertimento No. 11 in D major, K. 251 "Nannerl-Septett" (1776)
- Divertimento No. 12 for winds in E♭ major, K. 252/240a (1776)
- Divertimento No. 13 for winds in F major, K. 253 (1776)
- Divertimento for piano, violin and violoncello in B♭ major, K. 254 ("Piano Trio No. 1") (1776)
- Divertimento No. 14 for winds in B♭ major, K. 270 (1777)
- Divertimento No. 15 in B♭ major, K. 287/271h "Lodron Night Music No. 2" ("Lodronische Nachtmusik") (1777)
- Divertimento No. 16 for winds in E♭ major, K. 289/271g (1777) (doubtful)
- Divertimento No. 17 in D major, K. 334/320b (1779–80)
- Five Divertimentos (25 pieces) for three basset horns in B♭ major, K. 439b (Anh. 229) (1783)
- Divertimento for two horns and strings in F major "A Musical Joke" ("Ein musikalischer Spaß"), K. 522 (1785–87?)
- Divertimento for string trio in E♭ major, K. 563 (1788)

==== Others ====
- Quodlibet, Gallimathias musicum in D major, K. 32 (1766)
- March and Divertimento in C major; the music title when the two marches of K. 214 are played before and after the three movements of Symphony in C major, K. 208+(102/213c) (Il re pastore) (1772, 1775)

Three Milanese Quartets called "Divertimento":

- String Quartet No. 2 in D major, K. 155/134a ("Divertimento") (1772)
- String Quartet No. 5 in F major, K. 158 ("Divertimento") (1772–73)
- String Quartet No. 6 in B♭ major, K. 159 ("Divertimento") (1773)

Incomplete

- Divertimento in F major, K. 288/246c (1777) (incomplete)
- Divertimento in D major, K. 320B (1772–73) (incomplete)

=== Marches ===
- March in D major, K. 62 (Introduction to K. 100 Serenade, also used in Mitridate, re di Ponto) (1769)
- March in D major, K. 189/167b (probably to open/close K. 185 Serenade) (1773)
- March in C major, K. 214 (two marches opening and closing the divertimento—three movements of Symphony in C major, K. 208+(102/213c)—Il re pastore) (1775)
- March in D major, K. 215/213b (to open and/or close Serenade, K. 204) (1775)
- March in D major, K. 237/189c (to open and/or close Serenade, K. 203) (1774)
- March in F major, K. 248 (for use with Divertimento No. 10, K. 247) (1776)
- March in D major, K. 249 (to open and/or close Serenade, "Haffner", K. 250) (1776)
- March in D major, K. 290 (for use with Divertimento No. 7, K. 205/167A) (1772)
- March in D major, K. 335/320a, No. 1 (probably to open Serenade, "Posthorn", K. 320) (1779)
- March in D major, K. 335/320a, No. 2 (probably to close Serenade, "Posthorn", K. 320) (1779)
- March in C major, K. 408/383e, No. 1 (1782)
- March in D major, K. 408/385a, No. 2 (1782)
- March in C major, K. 408/383F, No. 3 (1782)
- March in D major, K. 445/320c (for use with Divertimento No. 17, K. 334) (1780)
- March, K. 676 (1780, lost)
- March in D major, K. 544 (1788, fragment)

==== Incomplete ====
- March in B♭ major, K. 384b (1782?) (incomplete)

=== Dances ===
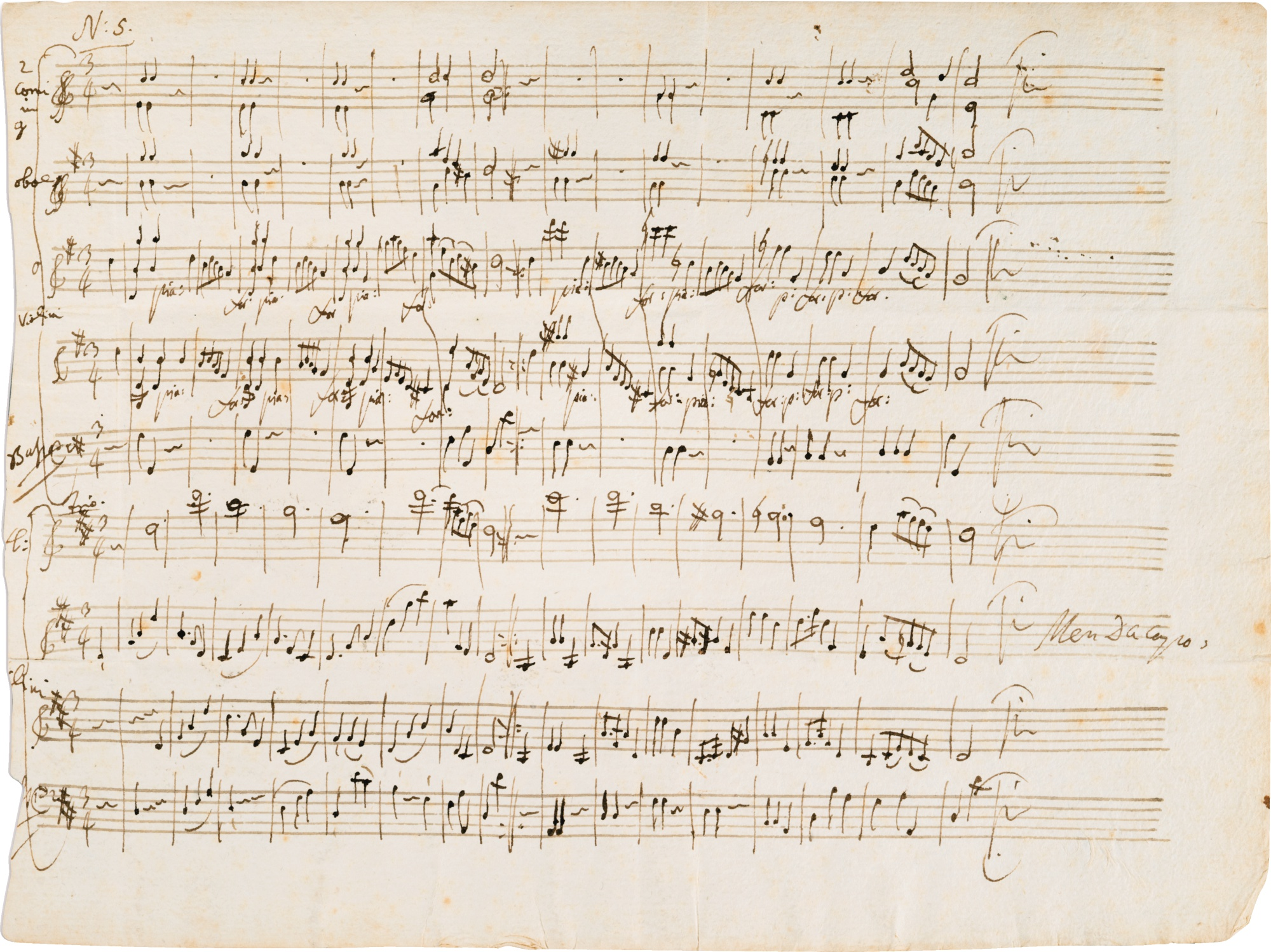
Autograph manuscript of the Minuet K. 164, number 5

Mozart left a huge production of dances for orchestra in different genres, including more than 100 minuets, over 30 contra dances, over 50 allemandes (Teitsch, Ländler, or German Dances), a gavotte (French folk dance) and ballet and pantomime music.

In his production of minuets, Mozart generally followed Haydn's example, preferring the slow character of the dance. Allemandes written between 1787 and 1791 were mainly for public balls in Vienna. In the Contredanse production, also written mainly in Vienna, some examples of program music are found, like Il Temporale, K. 534, La Bataille, K. 535, Canary, K. 600/5, etc.

Minuet

- 7 Menuets, K. 61b/65a (1769)
- 2 Menuets, K. 61g (1769–70)
- 6 Menuets, K. 61h (including No. 3 Symphony in D major, K. 135+61h) (1769?)
- 20 Menuets, K. 103/61d (1770-71)
- 6 Menuets, K. 104/61e (1770–71)
- 6 Menuets, K. 105/61f (doubtful) (1770-71)
- Menuet in E♭ major, K. 122/73t (1770)
- 6 Menuets, K. 164/130a (1772)
- 16 Menuets, K. 176 (1773)
- 3 Menuets, K. 363 (1783?)
- Symphonic Minuet in C major, K. 409/383f (1782)
- 5 Menuets, K. 461/448a (1784)
- 2 Minuets with Contredanses in F major and B♭ major (Quadrilles), K. 463/448c (1784)
- 12 Menuets, K. 568 (1788)
- 12 Menuets, K. 585 (1789)
- 6 Menuets, K. 599 (1791)
- 4 Menuets, K. 601 (1791)
- 2 Menuets, K. 604 (1791)

Contra dance

- 4 Contredanses, K. 101/250a (alternative title: Serenade No. 2) (1776)
- Overture and 3 Contredanses, K. 106/588a (doubtful) (1790)
- Contredanse in B♭ major, K. 123/73g (1770)
- 4 Contredanses, K. 267/271c (1777)
- 2 or 4 Contredanses for Count Johann Rudolf Czernin, K. 269b (1777)
- 6 Contredanses, K. 462/448b (1784)
- 9 Countredanses, K. 510/Anh.C 13.02 (1787)
- Contredanse in D major, "Das Donnerwetter" (The Thunderstorm), K. 534 (1788)
- Contredanse in C major, "La Bataille", K. 535 (1788)
- 3 Contredanses, K. 535a (1788)
- Contredanse in B♭ K. 535b (fragment) (1788)
- 2 Contredanses, K. 565 (lost) (1788)
- Contredanse in D K. 565a (fragment) (1788)
- Contredanse in C major, "Der Sieg vom Helden Koburg" (Coburg's Victory), K. 587 (1789)
- 2 Contredanses, K. 603 (1791)
- Contredanse in E♭ major, "Il Trionfo delle Donne", K. 607/605a (1791)
- 5 Contredanses, K. 609 (includes No. 1 "Non più andrai") (1791)
- Contredanse in G major, "Les filles malicieuses", K. 610 (1791)

Allemande

- 6 German Dances, K. 509 (1787)
- 6 German Dances, K. 536 (1788)
- 6 German Dances, K. 567 (1788)
- 6 German Dances, K. 571 (1789)
- 12 German Dances, K. 586 (1789)
- 6 German Dances, K. 600 (includes No. 5 Trio: "Der Kanarienvogel" The Canary) (1791)
- 4 German Dances, K. 602 (includes No. 3 "Die Leirer") (1791)
- Three German Dances, K. 605 (includes No. 3 "Die Schlittenfahrt" Sleigh Ride) (1791)
- 6 Ländler in B♭ major, "Ländlerische Tänze", K. 606 (1791)
- German Dance in C major, K. 611 "Die Leirer" (1791)

Others

- Sketch of a ballet, Le gelosie del Serraglio, K. Anh. 109/135a (1772, fragment)
- Ballet, Les petits riens (The Little Nothings), K. Anh. 10/299b (1778)
- Sketches for a ballet intermezzo, "Bagatelles Ballet Pantomime", K. 299c (1778, fragment)
- La Chasse (The Hunt) in A major, K. Anh. 103/299d, (1778, fragment)
- Gavotte in B♭ major, K. 300 (1778)
- Ballet music for Idomeneo, K. 367 (1781)
- Musik zu einer Pantomime: Pantalon und Colombine (Music to a Pantomime) in D major, K. 446/416d (1783, fragment)

== Church sonatas ==
- Church Sonata No. 1 in E♭, K. 67/41h (1772)
- Church Sonata No. 2 in B♭, K. 68/41i (1772)
- Church Sonata No. 3 in D, K. 69/41k (1772)
- Church Sonata No. 4 in D, K. 144/124a (1774)
- Church Sonata No. 5 in F, K. 145/124b (1774)
- Church Sonata No. 6 in B♭, K. 212 (1775)
- Church Sonata No. 7 in F, K. 224/241a (1776)
- Church Sonata No. 8 in A, K. 225/241b (1776)
- Church Sonata No. 9 in G, K. 241 (1776)
- Church Sonata No. 10 in F, K. 244 (1776)
- Church Sonata No. 11 in D, K. 245 (1776)
- Church Sonata No. 12 in C, K. 263 (1776)
- Church Sonata No. 13 in G, K. 274/271d (1777)
- Church Sonata No. 14 in C, K. 278/271e (1777)
- Church Sonata No. 15 in C, K. 328/317c (1779)
- Church Sonata No. 16 in C, K. 329/317a (1779)
- Church Sonata No. 17 in C, K. 336/336d (1780)

Others

- Church Sonata in C major, K. 124c (fragment)
- Church Sonata in D major, K. Anh. 65a (fragment; spurious, attributed to Leopold Mozart)
- Church Sonata in C, K. 677 (1780, lost)

== Organ music ==
- Fugue in E♭ major, K. 153 (375f) (incomplete) (1782)
- Fugue in G minor, K. 154 (385k) (incomplete) (1782)
- Ouverture in C major, K. 399 (385i) (1782)
- Fugue in G minor, K. 401 (375e) (incomplete) (1782)
- Kleine Gigue in G, K. 574 (1789)
- Adagio in D minor, K.Anh. 35/593a (1790)
- Adagio and Allegro in F minor for a Mechanical Organ, K. 594 (1790)
- Fantasia in F minor for a Mechanical Organ, K. 608 (1791)
- Andante in F for a Small Mechanical Organ, K. 616 (1791)

== Masonic music ==
The following are compositions written for the Masonic Lodge:

- Song for tenor and piano, "Lobegesang auf die feierliche Johannisloge" ("O heiliges Band der Freundschaft treuer Brüder") [O sacred bond of friendship between true brothers], K. 148/125h, (1772)
- Cantata for two tenors, male chorus, and orchestra, Dir, Seele des Weltalls, K. 429/468a (fragment, completed by Maximilian Stadler) (1783)
- Song for tenor and piano, "Lied zur Gesellenreise: Die ihr einem neuen Grad", K. 468, "for use at installation of new journeymen" (1785)
- Cantata for tenor, male chorus, and orchestra, Die Maurerfreude (The Freemason's Joy) K. 471 (1785)
- The Masonic Funeral Music (Maurerische Trauermusik), K. 477/479a (1785), for orchestra, which was composed for an actual Masonic funeral
- Two songs for tenor, male chorus and organ used for the opening and closing ceremonies of the lodge in Austria "Zur Neugekrönten Hoffnung":
  - "Zerfließet Heut, Geliebter Brüder", K. 483 (1786)
  - "Ihr Unsre Neuen Leiter", K. 484 (1786)
- The Little German Cantata (Kleine Deutsche Kantate) ("Die ihr die unermeßlichen Weltalls Schöpfer ehrt"), for tenor and piano, for use at meetings of the Colony of the Friends of Nature, K. 619 (1791)
- The Kleine Freimaurer-Kantate (Little Masonic Cantata) "Laut verkünde unsre Freude", for two tenors, bass, male chorus, and orchestra, K. 623 (1791)
- Song for male chorus and orchestra, "Laßt uns mit geschlungnen Händen", K. 623a, ("for the close of the lodge" and intended final chorus to K. 623) (1791; doubtful)

== Handel adaptations ==
- Acis und Galatea, K. 566 (1788)
- Der Messias, K. 572 (1789)
- Das Alexander-Fest, K. 591 (1790)
- Ode auf St. Caecilia, K. 592 (1790)

== See also ==
- Mozart symphonies of spurious or doubtful authenticity
