= K127 =

K127 or K-127 may refer to:

- K-127 (Kansas highway), a former state highway in Kansas
- Kyocera K127, a cell phone
- K. 127, Regina coeli, a 1772 composition by Wolfgang Amadeus Mozart
