= K194 =

K194 or K-194 may refer to:

- K-194 (Kansas highway), a state highway in Kansas
- Mass in D major, K. 194
