= K36 =

K36 may refer to:

- K-36 trailer, an American military trailer
- Ikeda Station (Hokkaido)
- NPP Zvezda K-36, an ejection seat
- "Or che il dover – Tali e cotanti sono", a concert aria by Wolfgang Amadeus Mozart
- Potassium-36, an isotope of potassium
- Rio Grande class K-36, an American steam locomotive
