= K47 =

K47 may refer to:

- K-47 (Kansas highway)
- HMS Polyanthus (K47), a Flower-class corvette of the Royal Navy
- INS Vinash (K47), a Veer-class corvette of the Indian Navy
- Keystone K-47 Pathfinder, an American airliner
- Junkers K 47, a Swedish fighter aircraft
- Potassium-47, an isotope of potassium
- Shiranuka Station, in Hokkaido, Japan
- Veni Sancte Spiritus (Mozart), by Wolfgang Amadeus Mozart
