= K217 =

K217 or K-217 may refer to:

- K-217 (Kansas highway), a former state highway in Kansas
- K. 217 ("Voi avete un cor fedele"), a 1775 concert aria by W. A. Mozart
- HMS Swale (K217), a former UK Royal Navy ship
