= Mass No. 3 =

Mass No. 3 may refer to:

- Mass No. 3 (Bruckner), in F minor, by Anton Bruckner
- Mass No. 3 (Haydn), Missa Cellensis in C major, by Joseph Haydn
- Mass No. 3 (Mozart), Dominicus in D minor, by Wolfgang Amadeus Mozart
- Mass No. 3 (Schubert), in B-flat major, by Franz Schubert
