= K273 =

K273 or K-273 may refer to:

- K-273 (Kansas highway), a former state highway in Kansas
- K273BH, a radio station
- K.273 Sancta Maria, mater Dei by Mozart (1777)
