= Symphony No. 52 =

Symphony No. 52 may refer to:

- Symphony No. 52 (Haydn) in C minor by Joseph Haydn, 1771–72
- Symphony No. 52 (Mozart) in C major (K. 208+102) by Wolfgang Amadeus Mozart, 1775
