= Grabmusik =

1767 cantata by Wolfgang Amadeus Mozart

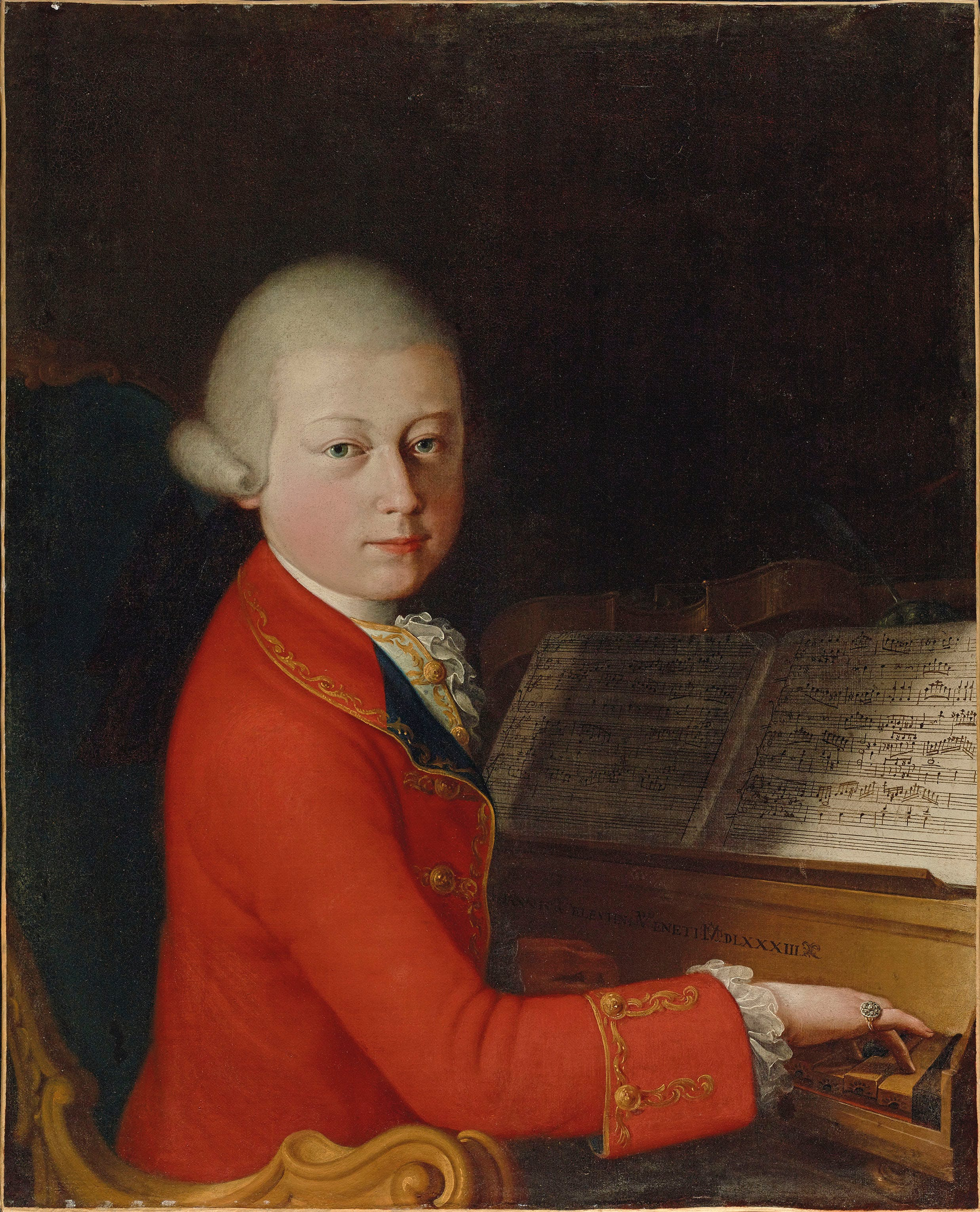
Portrait of Mozart attributed to Giambettino Cignaroli, c. 1770

Grabmusik (Grave Music), K. 42/35a, is a 20-minute cantata by Wolfgang Amadeus Mozart. Translated variously into Cantata on Christ's Grave and Music for the Holy Sepulchre, it was composed in Salzburg during Holy Week in 1767. The circumstances of the work's composition are bizarre, as the eleven-year-old Mozart was closeted at the order of Sigismund von Schrattenbach, who doubted the authenticity of the previous works attributed to him, and subsequently required him to write the cantata in the course of a week.

The author of the text is unknown, but there have been several assumptions among musicologists, reflecting the attribution of Mozart's previous sacred singspiel Die Schuldigkeit des ersten Gebots.

== Background ==
It was (and still is) customary for a passion oratorio to be performed on Good Friday in several parts of Southern Germany, with evidence of Leopold II writing such sepolcri with his court musicians in Vienna. Traditionally, these oratorios would be staged dramatically, with spectacular scenic design and even division of the stage into three parts: Heaven, Earth and Hell, along with corresponding division of the orchestra. These performances took place with music by popular Italian composers such as Antonio Draghi and Antonio Caldara (Draghi's setting with text by Nicolò Minato was staged in Vienna in 1696; the music has subsequently been lost).

The story surrounding the composition of Mozart's Grabmusik has generally been accepted by musicologists, although there have been other explanations. The popular narrative is that the Prince-Archbishop at the time, Sigismund von Schrattenbach, did not believe that such musically mature compositions could have been written by a boy of Wolfgang's age. To quote Karl Gustav Fellerer:

[Schrattenbach] not crediting that such masterly compositions were really those of a child, shut him up for a week, during which he was not permitted to see anyone, and was left with only music paper, and the words of an oratorio. During this short time he composed a very capital oratorio, which was most highly approved of upon being performed.

The earliest extant evidence of this narrative derives from the English intellect Daines Barrington, where it is referenced in his 1769 report on the young Mozart to the Royal Society. This story could very well be apocryphal, and is doubted by musicologist Maynard Solomon in his 1995 biography on the composer, although there is a similar story from later on in Wolfgang's childhood. During his first Italian trip, he spent the summer of 1770 with Count Gian Luca Pallavicini, whose house was situated near Bologna. Before departing, Wolfgang applied for admission to the Accademia Filarmonica, and was required to undergo a series of tests to garner a membership. He was instructed to write a contrapuntal work, in the strict style observed by the Accademia, that is, the Renaissance style of liturgical music. According to Mozart's father, Leopold, Wolfgang took a "mere half hour" to complete a 22-bar long composition (the antiphon "Quaerite primum regnum Dei", K. 86/73v). There are annotations by Giovanni Battista Martini, Mozart's mentor, but the work was still approved by two examiners and Wolfgang was duly given a membership.

In the notes of her book on Mozart's early operas, Carolyn Gianturco states that the work composed during the time Wolfgang was closeted was in fact Die Schuldigkeit des ersten Gebots. This claim has been opposed by musicologist and Mozart scholar Rudolph Angermüller, who concludes that, due to the multifaceted nature of the singspiel, it is difficult to relate the story to the work. The entirety of the score of Die Schuldigkeit des ersten Gebots takes up 106 sheets, and considering all of the recitatives are in Leopold's hand, there is no conclusive evidence that the work could have been written in examination conditions. Furthermore, Angermüller brings up the unlikeliness that a 10 year old boy would be able to compose a work of such size in the course of a week.

== Text, scoring ==
The text of the work is centred around a dialogue between a Soul (bass) and an Angel (soprano). The author of the text is still unknown, and has sparked debate amongst scholars. Among those considered have been Jacobus Antonius Wimmer (1725–1774), who was also considered as an author for the libretto of Die Schuldigkeit des ersten Gebots, as well as Johann Andreas Schachtner, a trumpet player and family friend of the Mozarts. In connection to Die Schuldigkeit des ersten Gebots, Ignatz Anton von Weiser was also considered, although Giegling regards the structure of the verse for the Grabmusik stylistically to be too different.

The cantata is scored for 2 oboes, violins I and I, violas I and II, cello (with optional bassoon and organ), and horns in D and E-flat.

The autograph score of the complete work was bought by Johann Anton André from Mozart's widow, Constanze, before it was passed down to his heirs. It was subsequently auctioned on 12 October 1929, but remained unsold and in the private collection of Heinrich Hinterberger (1892–1970). It was in the collection of the Peters Music Library until 1939 when it was purchased by Walter Hinrichsen (1907–1969). It was then placed in the Prussian State Library and was thought of as lost until it resurfaced in the newly established Berlin State Library in 1991.

== Movements ==
The cantata consist of eight movements:

1. "Wo bin ich? bittrer Schmerz!" – bass recitative
2. "Felsen, spaltet euren Rachen" – bass aria, D major/D minor/D major
3. "Geliebte Seel', was redest du?" – soprano recitative
4. "Betracht dies Herz und frage mich" – soprano aria, G minor
5. "O Himmel! was ein traurig Licht" – bass recitative
6. "Jesu, was hab ich getan?" / "Schau dies Herz nur reuvoll an" – duet, E-flat major
7. "O lobenswerter Sinn!" – soprano recitative
8. "Jesu, wahrer Gottessohn" – SATB choir, C major, E-flat major, C major

== Recordings ==
There have been very few recordings of Mozart's Grabmusik. Some of the notable ones are:

- 1988 – Ann Murray (soprano), Stephen Varcoe (baritone) – Südfunk-Chor, Radio-Sinfonieorchester Stuttgart, conducted by Sir Neville Marriner – Philips Classics 2 CDs 422 360-2 (included in volume 22 of The Complete Mozart Edition).
- 1990 – Edith Wiens (soprano), Thomas Hampson (baritone) – Concentus Vocalis, Wiener Akademie, conducted by Martin Haselböck – Novalis, CD 150 068-2 (reissued in 2003 by Brilliant Classics for their own Mozart Edition).
- 1991 – Sylvia McNair (soprano), Thomas Hampson (baritone) – Arnold Schoenberg Chor, Concentus Musicus Wien, conducted by Nikolaus Harnoncourt – Teldec CD 4509-98928-2 (part of Harnoncourt's project to record Mozart's complete sacred music, between 1982–1998).
- 2018 – Anna Lucia Richter (soprano), Jacques Imbrailo (baritone) – The Mozartists, conducted by Ian Page – Signum Classics CD SIGCD547 (paired with Bastien und Bastienne).
