= Mass in D major =

Mass in D major may refer to:

- Mass in D major, K. 194 (Mozart)
- Missa solemnis (Beethoven)
- Mass in D major (Dvořák)
- Mass in D (Smyth)
