= Sonata for piano four-hands, K. 497 =

1786 composition by Wolfgang Amadeus Mozart

Sonata for piano four-hands
- by W. A. Mozart
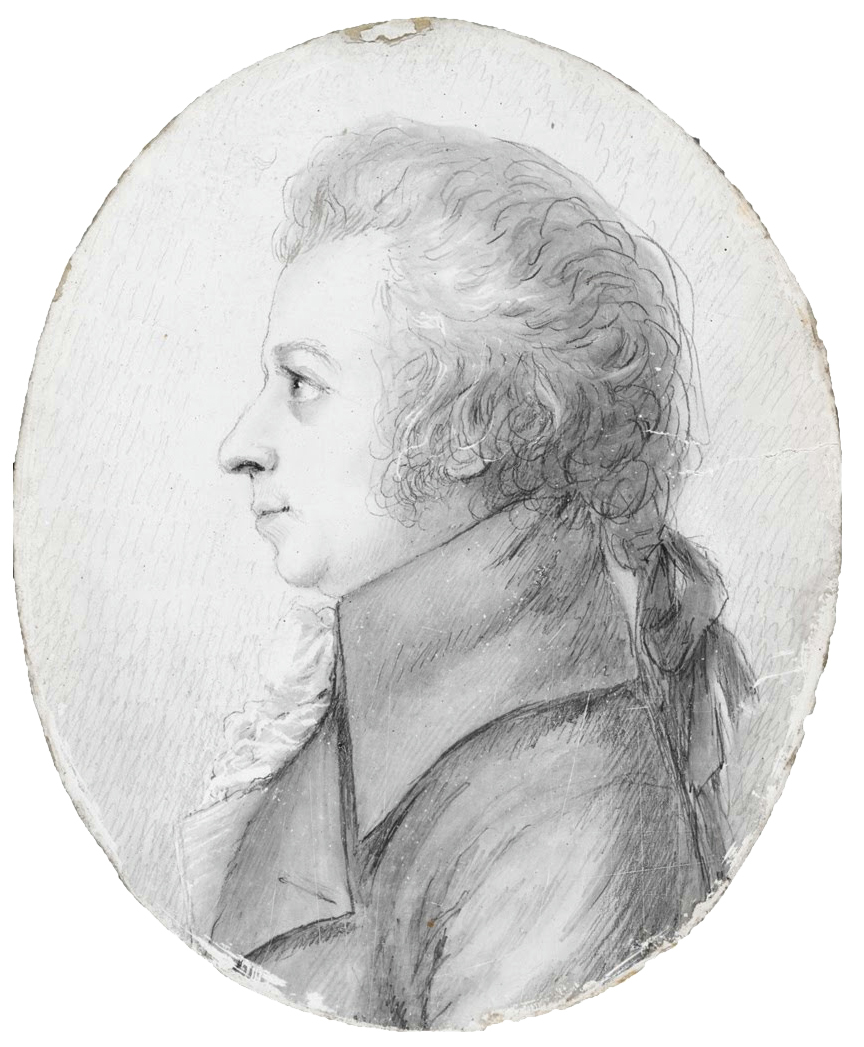
- Mozart in 1789, drawing by Dora Stock
- Key: F major
- Catalogue: K. 497
- Composed: 1786
- Movements: 3

The Sonata for piano four-hands in F major, K. 497, is a sonata for piano four-hands in three movements composed by Wolfgang Amadeus Mozart in 1786.

The autograph manuscript of the sonata is preserved in the Fitzwilliam Museum, Cambridge.

== History ==
Mozart composed the sonata for piano four-hands in F major in Vienna in August 1786, between composing his operas Le nozze di Figaro and Don Giovanni. He may have written it to play it with a student, Nikolaus Joseph von Jacquin's daughter Franziska von Jacquin.

== Movements ==
The sonata is structured in three movements:

1. Adagio – Allegro di molto
2. Andante
3. Allegro

It is Mozart's only sonata for piano four-hand with a slow introduction to the first movement.

Recordings on fortepianos include:

- George Malcolm, András Schiff. Mozart. Piano Music for 4 Hands. Label: London, 1993. Fortepiano by Anton Walter (Mozart's own).
- Rolf Junghanns, Bradford Tracey. Mozart, Beethoven, Weber. Vierhändige Klaviermusik von Mozart, Beethoven und Weber. Label: FSM. Fortepiano by Adlam & Burnett (Goudhurst) after Matthäus Heilmann (Mainz, c. 1780).
- Bart van Oort, Ursula Dütschler. Mozart. Label: Brilliant Classics, 2001. Fortepiano by Chris Maene (Ruiselede, 2000) after Walter (c. 1795).
- Yoshio Watanabe, Akiko Sakikawa. Mozart. Label: ALM Records, 2004. Fortepiano by Ferdinand Hofmann (Vienna, c. 1790-1795).
- Marie Kuijken, Veronica Kuijken. Mozart. Sonatas for Four Hands. Label: Challenge Classics, 2009. Fortepiano by Claude Kelecom after Johann Andreas Stein.
- Julian Perkins, Emma Abbate. Mozart. Piano Duets, Volume 2. Label: Resonus Classics, 2017. Fortepiano by Michael Rosenberger (Vienna, c. 1800).
