= Voi avete un cor fedele =

1775 soprano aria by W. A. Mozart

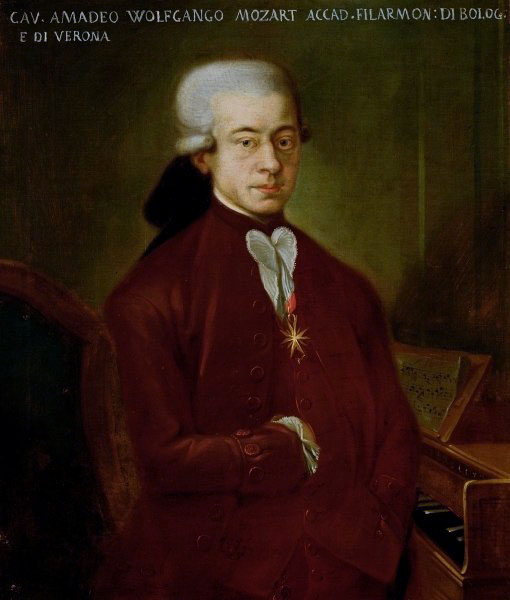
1777 portrait of Mozart

"Voi avete un cor fedele", K. 217, is a concert aria by Wolfgang Amadeus Mozart for solo soprano and orchestra, composed in Salzburg, dated 26 October 1775. Written around the time of the composition of Mozart's five violin concertos. In this aria, the character Dorina contemplates a new romantic partner.

A travelling Italian opera company visited Salzburg, and asked Mozart to write an insertion aria for an opera buffa being performed based on a play by the dramatist Carlo Goldoni titled Le Nozze di Dorina. The scholar Stanley Sadie noted that it is not clear whether the opera in question was Le nozze (1755) by the Italian composer Baldassare Galuppi to a libretto by Carlo Goldoni or Gioacchino Cocchi's Le Nozze di Dorina (1762) to the same libretto. The aria "is substantial, with ironic overtones, set in alternating slow and fast sections, shows a remarkable advance in comic aptitude in its gestures and its timing as compared with anything in La finta giardiniera", which Mozart had completed few months earlier. Julian Rushton, however, disagrees with Sadie's glowing assessment, wondering where the aria's "giddy coloratura" fits into the comic scheme of the opera.

The aria was published by Breitkopf & Härtel in 1882. It remains a popular concert piece, often performed and recorded.

== Description ==
Sung by the character Dorina, the aria is marked Andantino grazioso, then allegro, and consists of 126 bars in the key of G major. The vocal range reaches from D_{4} to B_{5}. A typical performance lasts for around seven minutes. The work calls for two oboes, two natural horns in G and strings. The time signature for the Andantino grazioso is 3/4 triple metre, then for the allegro, common time. The aria contains scales and trills with bravura passages.

== Text ==
Voi avete un cor fedele,
Come amante appassionato:
Ma mio sposo dichiarato,
Che farete? cangerete?
Dite, allora che sarà?
Manterrete fedeltà?

Ah! non credo.
Già prevedo,
Mi potreste corbellar.
Non ancora,
Non per ora,
Non mi vuò di voi fidar.

You have a faithful heart,
like any impassioned lover;
but once my troth is plighted,
tell me, what will you do?
Will you change?
Will you remain faithful?

Ah, I cannot believe it!
It is already foretold,
you will make a fool of me.
Not yet,
not for now
will I trust in you.
