= Kyocera K127 =

Mobile phone

Kyocera Marbl
- Compatible networks: PCS
- Form factor: Clamshell
- Dimensions: 3.39 in x 1.73 in x 0.83 in (86 mm x 44 mm x 21 mm)
- Weight: 2.96 oz (84 g)
- Battery: 900 mAh Li-ion
- Display: 128x128 pixel LCD Color Display

The Kyocera K127, sometimes referred to as the Kyocera Marbl, is a clamshell-style phone from Kyocera. Features include:

- LCD color display - 128 x 128 pixels
- BREW downloadable games
- Contact directory stores personal and business information (200 entries)
- Web access: WAP 2.0 Browser
- EMS capable
- GPS Locator
- Voice Dialing

Other technical data:

- Form Factor: Clamshell
- Battery Life: Talk: 3.7 hours, Standby: 180 hours

== Carriers ==
- Virgin Mobile USA
