= Per questa bella mano =

1791 concert aria by Mozart

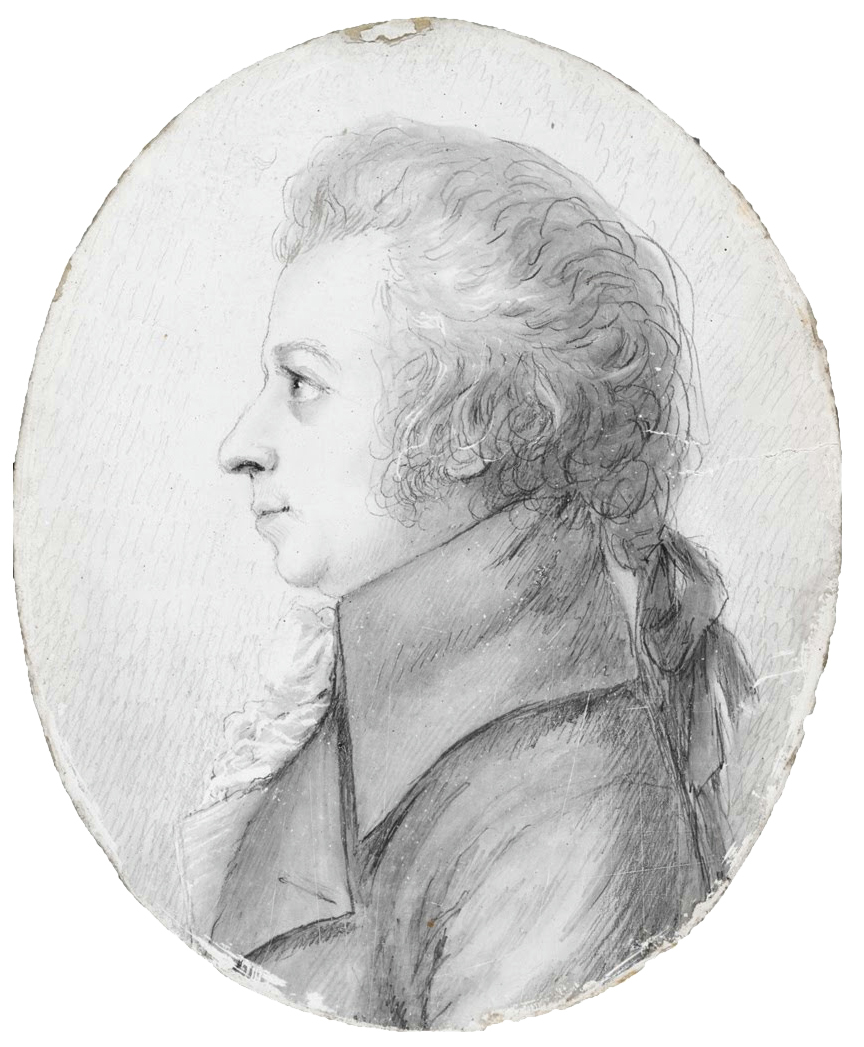
Dora Stock's 1789 miniature of Mozart

"Per questa bella mano", K. 612, is a concert aria by Wolfgang Amadeus Mozart for solo bass with an obbligato double bass. Composed in Vienna, it is dated 8 March 1791 in Mozart's own catalogue. It is well known by players of the double bass, with difficult scale work and double stops. It may have been composed as an interlude in a performance of an opera buffa, written by another composer. The aria remains a popular and often performed concert piece today.

== Description ==
The work calls for one flute, two oboes, two bassoons, two horns in D, solo double bass, bass singer, and strings.

The piece is in two sections; a slow 6/8 andante, finishing with an allegro in common time. The text is a romantic declaration of love. The aria is in the key of D major.

The original singer was Franz Xaver Gerl, who notably sung the roles of Don Giovanni, Figaro and Sarastro. The original double bass player was Friederich Pischelberger.

== Text ==
The text of this aria is of unknown origin. It has been speculated that the libretto was from the comic opera Le vicende d'amore (1784), written by Giambattista Neri; however, the two libretti are completely unrelated. The only similarities that they share are the opening four words "per questa bella mano", in Neri's libretto "per questa mano bella".

Per questa bella mano
Per questi vaghi rai
Giuro, mio ben, che mai
Non amerò che te.

L'aure, le piante, i sassi,
Che i miei sospir ben sanno,
A te qual sia diranno
La mia costante fè.

Volgi lieti o fieri sguardi,
Dimmi pur che m'odi o m'ami,
Sempre acceso ai dolci dardi,
Sempre tuo vo' che mi chiami,
Nè cangiar può terra o cielo
Quel desio che vive in me.

By this fair hand,
by these lovely eyes,
I swear, my dearest, that never
will I love anyone but you.

The breezes the plants, the stones,
which know my sighs full well,
will tell you how constant
is my fidelity.

Turn your proud gaze happily on me
and say whether you hate or love me!
Ever inflamed by your tender glances,
I want you to call me yours forever;
neither earth nor heaven can change
that desire which dwells within me.
