= Adagio and Fugue in C minor (Mozart) =

Composition for string quartet by Mozart

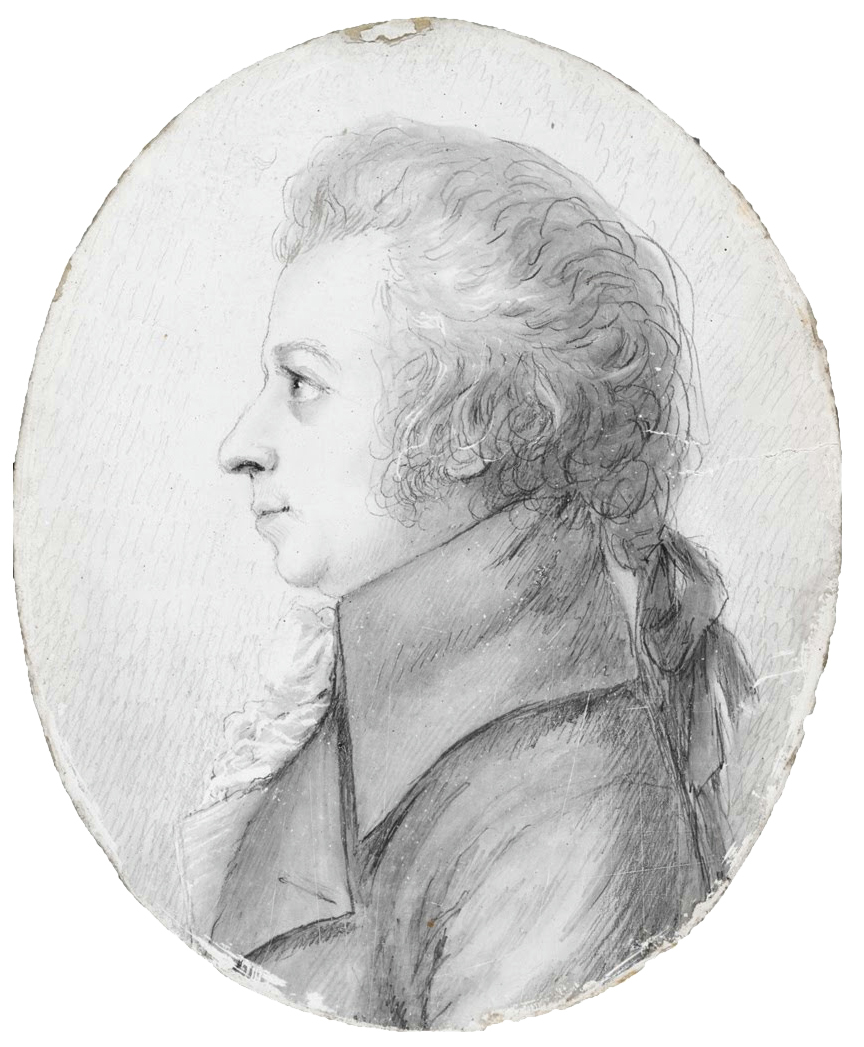
Stock's 1789 miniature of Mozart

The Adagio and Fugue in C minor, K. 546, is a composition by Wolfgang Amadeus Mozart for strings. Mozart entered it into his own work catalogue on 26 June 1788 in Vienna as "A short Adagio for two violins, viola and bass, for a fugue which I wrote some time ago for two Pianos". The fugue in question was the two piano fugue in C minor, K. 426, written in December 1783.

== Form ==
The work is in two sections:

1. Adagio
2. Fuga (Allegro)

The 52-bar Adagio has a very ominous and foreboding tone; musicologist Robert D. Levin said: "Angular outbursts alternate with an unearthly hush; its suggestions of violence and mysticism make the ensuing geometry of the fugue seem a relief". The adagio section is notated in 3/4 time, and the fugue is written as an Allegro common time.

== Composition ==
The reason for the work's composition remains a mystery, as there is no known commission for it. One theory is that it was composed on a suggestion by F. A. Hoffmeister, who originally published the work. 1788 was also a time of significant contrapuntal composition for Mozart; in that year he composed a five-part fugue in the key of C major, for the finale of his Symphony No. 41 K.551, so possibly fugal ideas were prominent in Mozart's mind at this time.

The autograph of the fugue of K.546 is in the British Library (Add MS 28966). The autograph of the Adagio is missing. In modern times, the work is typically played for string quartet, though, a few recordings can be found using the interpreted orchestral version.
