= Johann Andreas Schachtner =

Johann Andreas Schachtner (9 March 1731 – 20 July 1795) was a German musician. He was court trumpeter in Salzburg, and friend there of the family of Wolfgang Amadeus Mozart; he was also a librettist for Mozart.

== Life ==
Schachtner was born in Dingolfing in Bavaria, and was educated at a Jesuit school in Ingolstadt. In Salzburg he studied the trumpet, and became in 1754 trumpeter to the Prince-Bishop. From 1781 he held the office of Spielgraf (an official who mediated between the nobility and musicians).

He knew the Mozart family in Salzburg, and played chamber music, as second violin, at the house of Wolfgang's parents. Years later he wrote, at the request of Mozart's sister Maria Anna Mozart, a letter (dated 24 April 1792, given in full in Otto Jahn's biography of Mozart, vol.1 p. 19), which gives a description of Wolfgang in his early years.

He wrote for Mozart the libretto of an opera, which was later completed by Johann Anton André who named the opera Zaide; and he translated the libretto of Idomeneo into German for Mozart.
