= Johann Anton André =

German composer and music publisher (1775–1842)

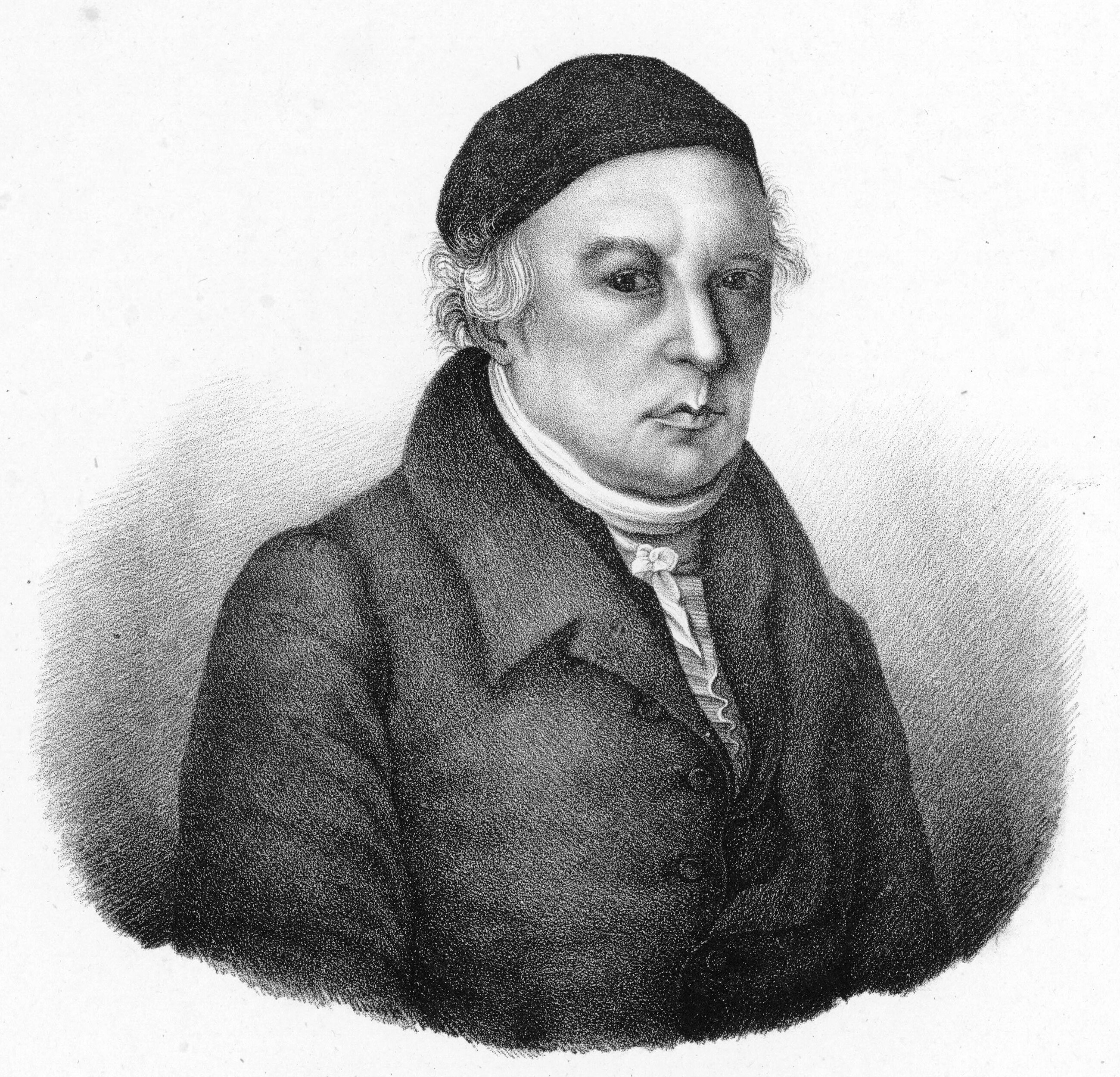
Johann Anton André

Johann Anton André (6 October 1775 – 6 April 1842) was a German composer and music publisher of the Classical period, best known for his central place in Mozart research.

== Life ==
Born in Offenbach am Main, André wrote operas, symphonies, masses, and lieder, as well as an unfinished Lehrbuch der Tonsetzkunst (Textbook of the Art of Composition) in two volumes. His teachers were Ferdinand Frenzel (violin) and Johann Georg Vollweiler (theory and composition). In 1799, André purchased a large volume of Mozart's musical papers (the Mozart-Nachlass) from the composer's widow Constanze, and brought them to Offenbach. This collection contained over 270 autographs and included the operas The Marriage of Figaro and The Magic Flute, a series of string quartets and string quintets, several piano concertos, and Eine kleine Nachtmusik. Based on these autographs, the André publishing house (founded in 1774 by André's father Johann André (1741–99) and still owned by the family today) prepared and issued some highly respected editions of Mozart's works, bringing many compositions into print for the first time. For this, André earned the title "father of Mozart research". He supplied the title Zaide to Mozart's hitherto unnamed and incomplete singspiel. André's father Johann André had set the same text to music, before Mozart commenced his singspiel.

The success of the firm turned crucially upon a meeting in Munich in 1799 between André and Alois Senefelder, the inventor of lithography. Senefelder agreed to collaborate with André and granted his firm the right of applying the new printing method to the printing of music for the first time. The first lithographed score was the vocal score of André's own opera Die Weiber von Weinsberg, which came off the press in 1800. In 1839, André handed over the business to his son Johann August André (1817–87).
