= Va, dal furor portata =

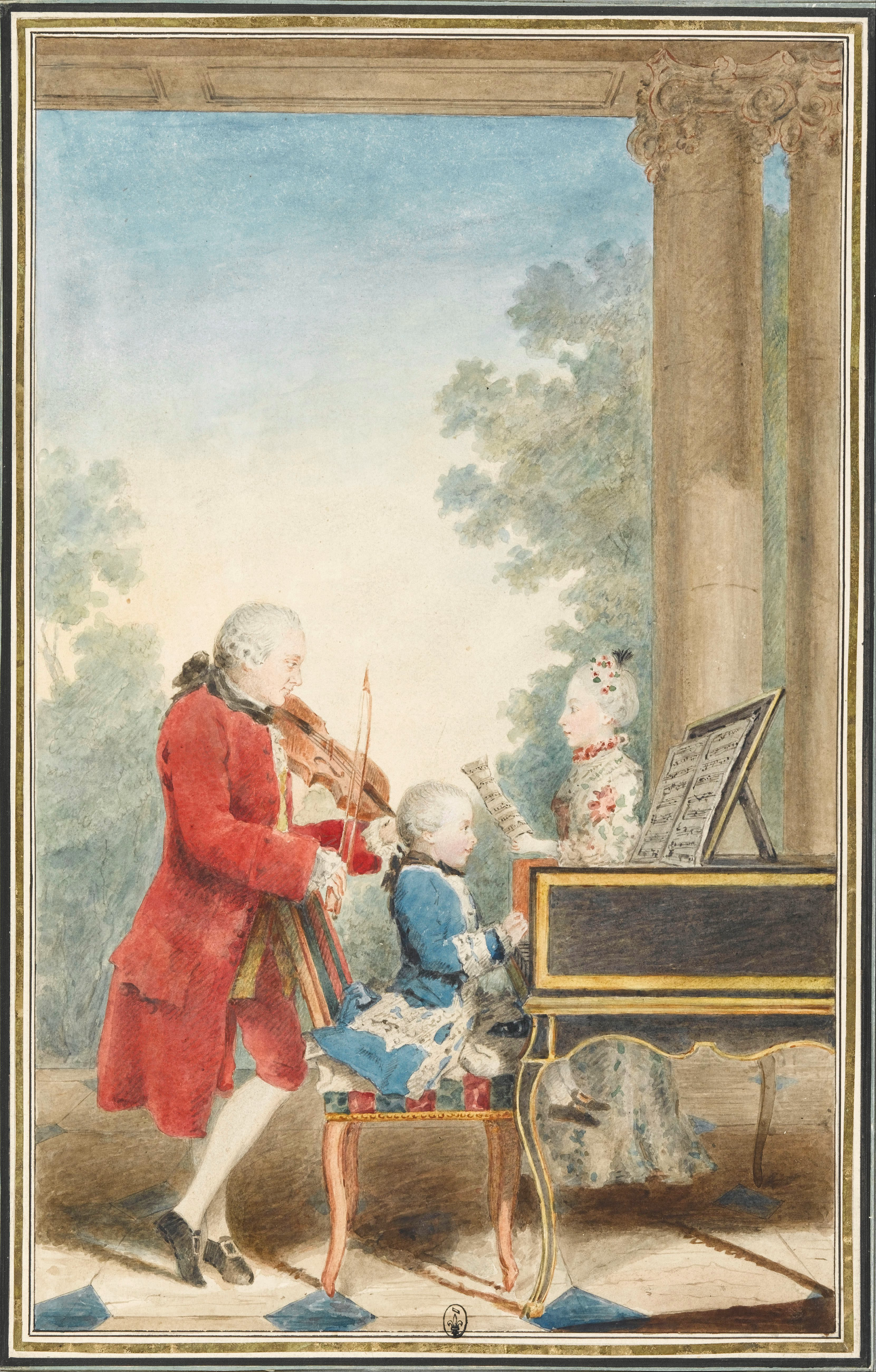
Carmontelle's 1763–64 Mozart family portrait

"Va, dal furor portata", K. 21 / K^{6} 19c, is an early concert aria in C major for tenor and orchestra by Wolfgang Amadeus Mozart. It was written 1765 in London during the Mozart family grand tour around Europe when Mozart was nine years old. The words are from Metastasio's Ezio, act 2, scene 4, by the character Massimo.

== Instrumentation ==
The work is scored for two oboes, two bassoons, two natural horns in C, strings and tenor.

== Libretto ==
Va, dal furor portata,
Palesa il tradimento;
Ma ti sovvenga ingrata,
Il traditor qual'è.

Scopri la frode ordita,
Ma pensa in quel momento,
Ch'io ti donai la vita,
Che tu la togli a me.

Go, transported by fury,
reveal the treachery;
but remember, ingrate,
who is the traitor.

Disclose the deception that was planned;
but at the moment consider
that I gave you life
and you take it from me.

== Sources ==
- "Va, dal furor portata", KV 21: Score and critical report (in German) in the Neue Mozart-Ausgabe
- "Va, dal furor portata": Scores at the International Music Score Library Project
