= Adagio and Allegro in F minor for a mechanical organ, K. 594 =

Composition by Wolfgang Amadeus Mozart

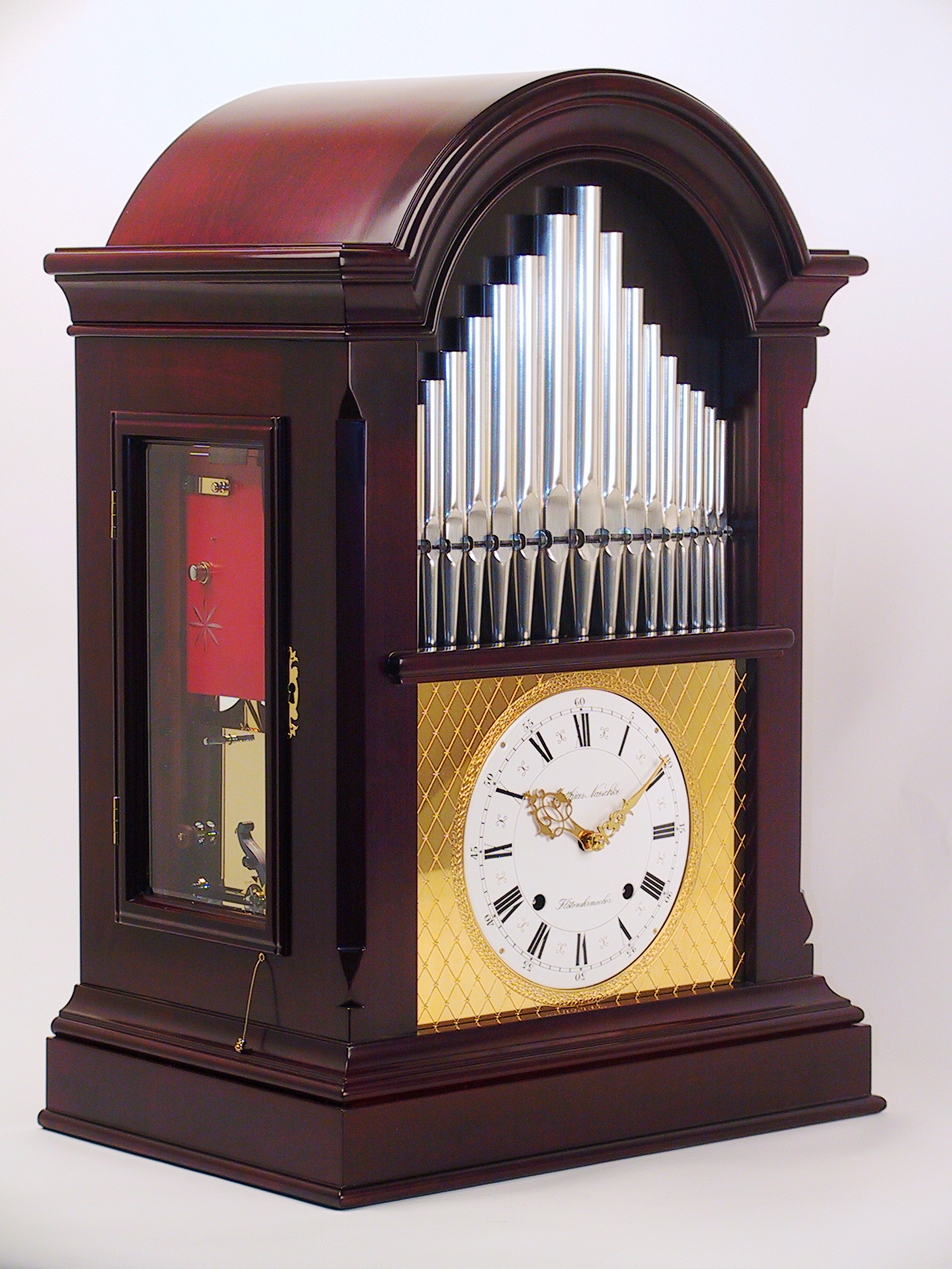
A German mechanical pipe organ clock

Adagio and Allegro in F minor for a mechanical organ, K. 594, is a composition by Wolfgang Amadeus Mozart, completed in late 1790.

== Background ==
The piece was commissioned by Count Joseph Deym von Stritetz for use as a funeral mass to be played on a mechanical organ clock in the mausoleum for the recently deceased Generalfeldmarschall (Field Marshal) Ernst Gideon von Laudon, part of the Müllersche Kunstgalerie, the wax art gallery and organ museum of "Joseph Müller" (which was the Count Deym's assumed name). This displayed a casket covered with glass, through which one could view a wax figure of the Field Marshal. When the clock struck the hour, a lament was heard: a new one each week, one of which was Mozart's Adagio and Allegro.

Although Mozart intended the piece to be played on a mechanical clockwork organ, he wished later that it could be played on a conventional organ. In a letter to his wife Constanze dated 3 October 1790, he wrote, "If it were on a large clock-work with a sound like an organ, I'd be glad to do it; but as it is a thing made up of tiny pipes only, which sound too shrill and childish for me". As time passed, Mozart seemed to be content with the decision, saying later that the work and its installation in the gallery in "fruitlessness and purity and compatibility to the works of art eclipses anything that anyone has ever succeeded in producing". The piece takes about twelve minutes to perform.

== Music ==
An excerpt from K. 594

The piece has three movements.

1. Adagio
2. Allegro
3. Adagio

The first movement is an adagio lasting two minutes and serving as an introduction. It is composed of a main theme, a bridge and a recapitulation of the main theme. This and the closing adagio are stately elegies, the music is "weeping" with predominantly descending chromatic lines.

The second movement of the piece lasts eight minutes. It has a lighter mood, with a faster tempo. Framed by the opening and closing adagios, this middle section depicts the military career of the Field Marshal. The last bars capture the uncertainties of a military career, where Mozart breaks away from an augmented sixth chord and leaves it hanging in the air, unresolved, for almost four full beats.

The final movement lasts roughly two minutes and returns to the darker mood of the first movement, recapitulating its main theme.

== Other works for mechanical organ ==
In 1791, Mozart wrote another piece in F minor for mechanical organ, "Ein Orgel Stück für eine Uhr" (an organ piece for a clock), K.608. This composition is believed to have also been commissioned by Count Deym.
