= Sancta Maria, mater Dei =

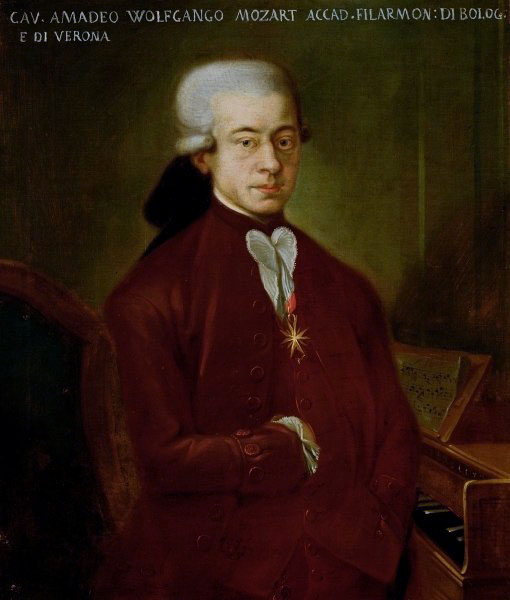
1777 portrait of Mozart

Sancta Maria, mater Dei (Holy Mary, mother of God), K. 273, is an act of Consecration to Blessed Virgin Mary in F major, written by Wolfgang Amadeus Mozart for SATB choir, first and second violins, violas and basso continuo of violoncello, double bass and organ. Mozart entered the work into his catalogue on 9 September 1777 in Salzburg.

== History ==
In the summer of 1777, the 21-year-old Mozart was desperate to leave Salzburg, and so asked Archbishop Colloredo to allow him and his father, Leopold, to find their income elsewhere. The archbishop's response was to dismiss both of them from his service, however he later felt remorse, and allowed Leopold to resume his job of deputy Kapellmeister. Mozart composed this act of consecration for the feast of the Nativity of the Blessed Virgin Mary (8 September), before setting out on 23 September 1777 with his mother on their journey to Augsburg, Mannheim, and Paris, where she died.

== Text ==
The text with English translation is as follows:

Latin

Sancta Maria, mater Dei,
ego omnia tibi debeo,
sed ab hac hora singulariter
me tuis servitiis devoveo.
Te patronam,
te sospitatricem eligo.
Tuus honor et cultus
aeternum mihi cordi fuerit,
quem ego nunquam deseram
neque ab aliis mihi subditis
verbo factoque violari patiar.
Sancta Maria, tu pia
me pedibus tuis advolutum recipe,
in vita protege,
in mortis discrimine defende.
Amen.

English

Holy Mary, Mother of God,
I owe all to you,
And from this hour
I devote myself only to your service.
You as a protector,
you as a preserver I choose.
Your reverence and honour
will be eternally in my heart,
which I shall never desert
nor submit, from others liable to me,
to it being violated by deed and by word.
Holy Mary, pious,
receive me, begging at your feet,
in life protect me,
defend me from the risk of death.
Amen.

The full title of the manuscripts and published scores are "Sancta Maria mottetto de B.V.M." or "Graduale ad festum b. M. v. : "Sancta Maria, mater Dei"" (that is: Motet of/for the Blessed Virgin Mary, or Gradual for the Festival of the Blessed Virgin Mary.) The title of the first (known?) (1804, Anton Böhm ) published edition was "Sancta Maria, mater Dei : motette zu Marienfesten für Chor, 2 Violinen, Viola, Kontrabass und Orgel.". Additionally, according to Neue Mozart-Archiv, the autograph and parts-copies have "offertorium" written (but not in Mozart's or any identified hand).
