= Veni Sancte Spiritus (Mozart) =

Mozart's Church Mass created in 1768

- Offertorium
- by Wolfgang Amadeus Mozart
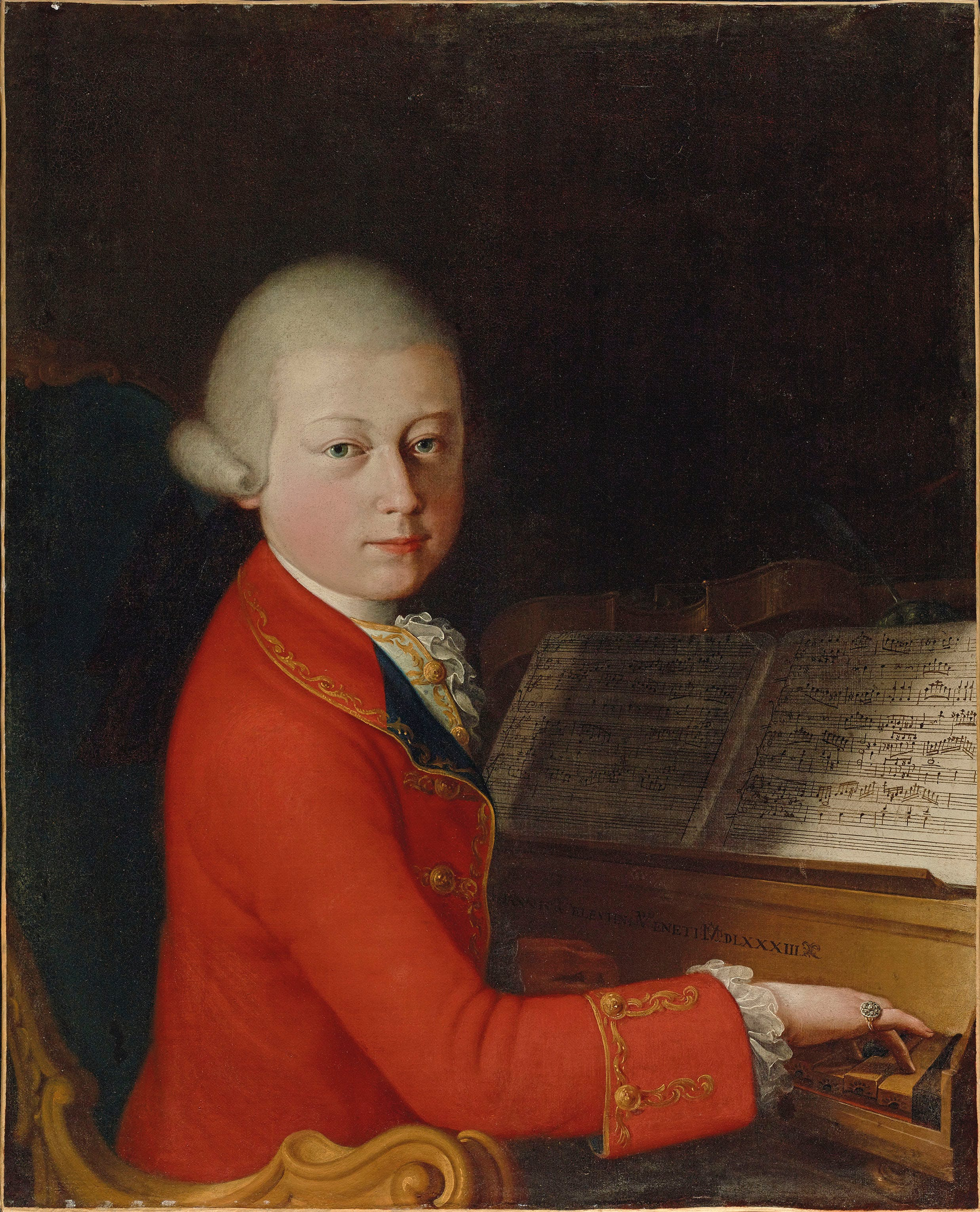
- 1770 Verona portrait of Mozart
- Key: C major
- Catalogue: K. 47
- Form: Motet
- Text: Pentecostal antiphon
- Language: Latin
- Composed: 1768
- Scoring: SATB solo and choir, orchestra

Veni Sancte Spiritus (Come, Holy Spirit), K. 47, is a sacred composition for choir and orchestra by Wolfgang Amadeus Mozart. He wrote it in Vienna in 1768 at age 12. He scored the work in C major for mixed choir SATB with a few solo lines, orchestra and organ. The text is a Pentecost antiphon, Ad invocandum Spiritum Sanctum (For invoking the Holy Spirit), which begins with the same words as the sequence Veni Sancte Spiritus, but continues differently. Mozart added the subtitle Offertorium, mentioning the intended use during the offertory of a church service. The beginning of the words suggests Pentecost, but the general call for the Holy Spirit seems more likely to have been composed in the fall.

The work is structured in two parts: the text of the antiphon and an extended Alleluia. The first part is in 3/4 time and marked Allegro, the second in 2/4 time and marked Presto. The choir sings most of the time, only occasionally interspersed by solo lines set for two voices. The orchestral parts are for two oboes, two horns, two trumpets, timpani, strings and organ. The music is influenced by his teachers Leopold Mozart, Michael Haydn and Johann Ernst Eberlin.

The Alleluia is sometimes performed independently.
