= Mass in D minor, K. 65 =

1769 composition by W. A. Mozart

Missa brevis in D minor
- Mass by W. A. Mozart
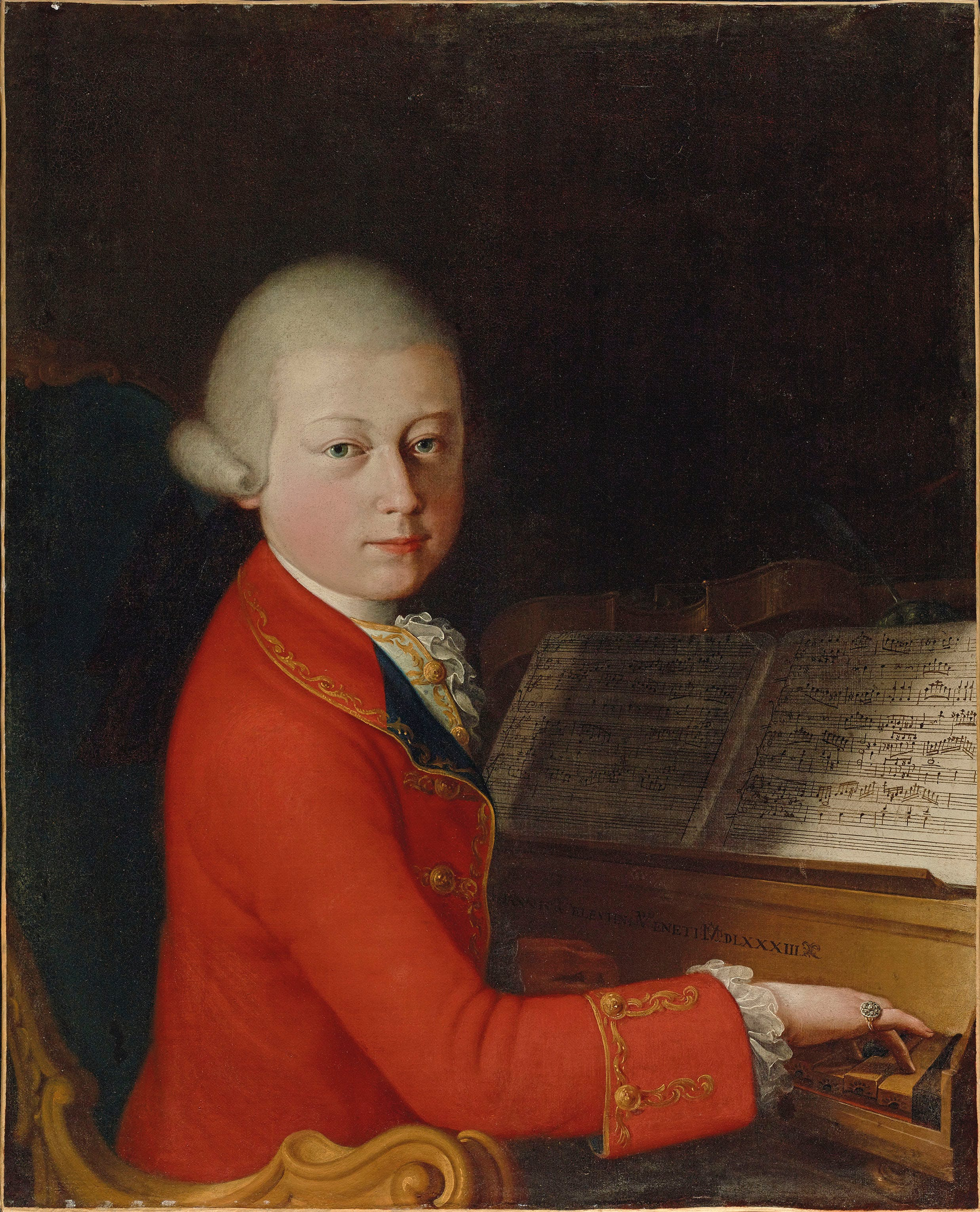
- Mozart aged 14 in January 1770
- Key: D minor
- Catalogue: K. 65/61a
- Composed: 14 January 1769: Salzburg
- Movements: 6
- Vocal: SATB choir and soloists
- Instrumental: 3 trombones; 2 violins; continuo

The Missa brevis in D minor, K. 65/61a, is a mass composed by Wolfgang Amadeus Mozart (12 years old at the time) and completed on 14 January 1769. It is scored for SATB soloists and choir, violin I and II, 3 trombones colla parte, and basso continuo.

The long held belief, based on Sigismund Keller's assertion in 1873, that this mass was first performed on 5 February 1769, the pre-Lenten Sunday of Quinquagesima, in the University of Salzburg's Kollegienkirche to open a forty-hour vigil, has later been shown as untenable. As a Lenten mass, the Gloria could not have been performed.

This is Mozart's shortest setting of the Order of Mass, and his only missa brevis set in a minor key.

The mass is divided into six movements.

1. Kyrie Adagio, D minor, common time
  "Kyrie eleison" – Allegro, D minor, 3/4
2. Gloria Allegro moderato, D minor, common time
3. Credo Allegro moderato, D minor, 3/4
  "Et incarnatus est" Adagio, D minor, cut common time
  "Et resurrexit" Allegro moderato, D minor, 3/4
  "Et vitam venturi saeculi" Più mosso, D minor, cut common time
4. Sanctus Adagio, D minor, cut common time
  "Pleni sunt coeli et terra" Allegro, D minor, common time
  "Hosanna in excelsis" Allegro, D minor, 3/4
5. Benedictus Andante, G minor, common time; soprano/alto duet
  "Hosanna in excelsis" Allegro, D minor, 3/4
6. Agnus Dei Andante, D minor, common time
  "Dona nobis pacem" Vivace, D minor, 3/8
