= Regina coeli (Mozart) =

Sacred choral music by Wolfgang Amadeus Mozart

- Sacred choral music by W. A. Mozart
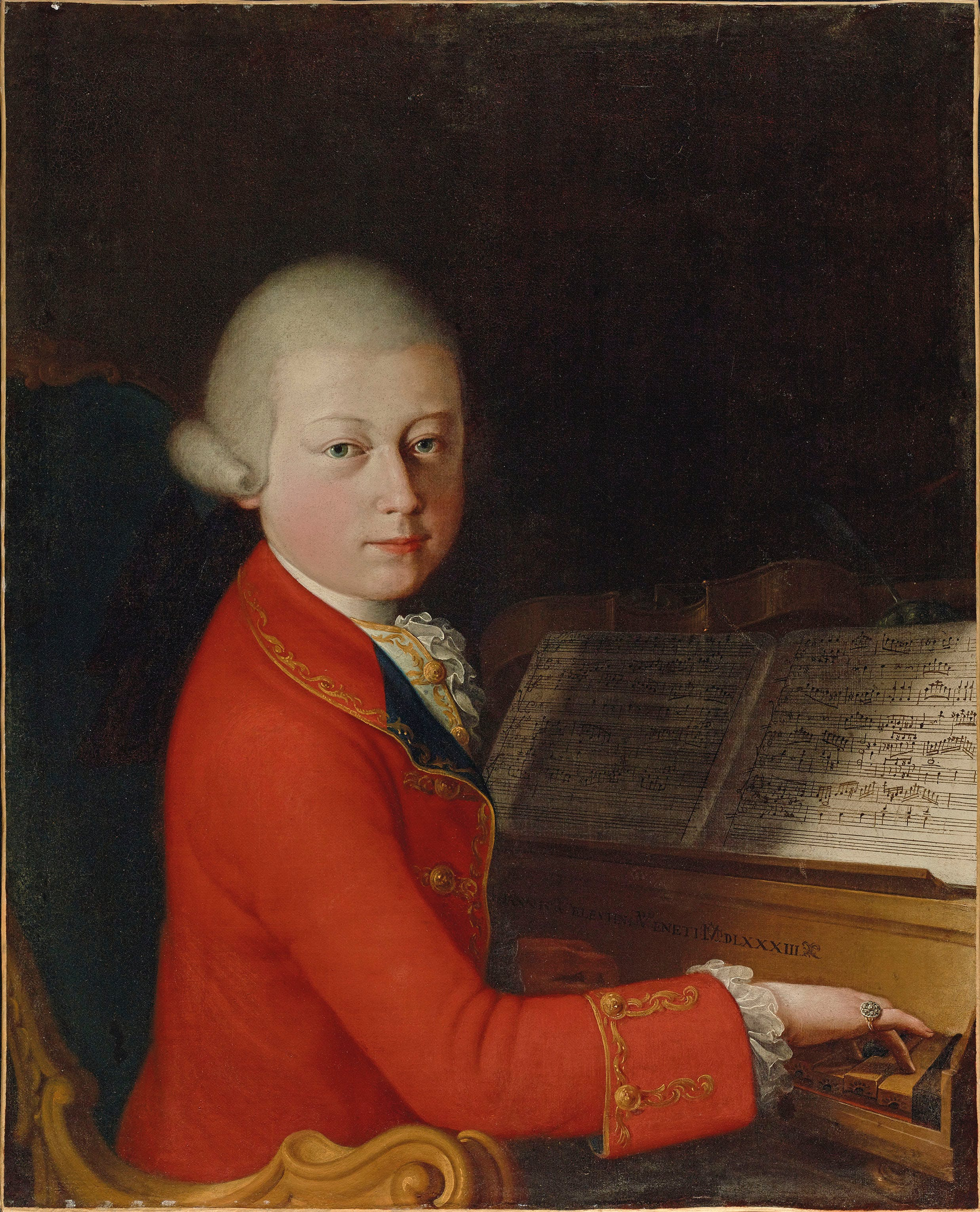
- 1770 Verona portrait of Mozart
- Key: C major
- Catalogue: K. 276
- Text: Regina caeli
- Language: Latin
- Composed: 1779
- Scoring: SATB soloists and choir, orchestra

Regina coeli (Queen of Heaven), a Marian antiphon, was set by Wolfgang Amadeus Mozart three times during his time at the Salzburg Cathedral. The best-known composition of the Latin Regina caeli for Eastertide is K. 276, a setting for four soloists, choir and orchestra, probably written in 1779. He wrote two earlier settings, K. 108 and K 127, both for soprano, choir and orchestra.

== History and music ==
When Wolfgang Amadeus Mozart was working at Salzburg Cathedral, he set the Latin Marian antiphon Regina caeli for Eastertide three times. The earliest is K. 108, a setting for soprano, choir and orchestra, written in May 1771 after Mozart's return from Italy. A year later, he wrote K. 127 for the same vocal forces, as a work in three movements. The solo part was composed for Maria Magdalena Haydn, the wife of Michael Haydn, sister in law of Joseph Haydn and court singer, probably in 1779, after his return from Paris. Mozart composed a setting for four soloists, four-part choir and orchestra, K. 276.

=== K. 108 ===
The Regina coeli in C major, KV 108, was written in 1771. It is in four movements for solo soprano and orchestra. Mozart adapted the style of the Italian concerto, with the choir mostly in motet style. The orchestra features trumpets and timpani.

=== K. 127 ===
The Regina coeli in B-flat major, K. 127, is styled like an concerto, with an opening fast movement in sonata form, a slow middle movement, and another fast movement, again in sonata form. In the first movement, the instruments present the themes. In the second movement, the setting of the text is dominant, with precedence over musical form, such as choral interjections "Resurrexit" within an arioso "Quia quem meruisti". In the final movement, "Alleluja", the virtuoso soprano interacts with the choir.

=== K. 276 ===
Mozart's third setting of the Marian calls for an orchestra of two trumpets and timpani, two oboes, strings and basso continuo. It is in C major, and in one movement, in which the soloists often alternate with the choir. The complete text is rendered again at the end, giving it the idea of a recapitulation.
