= Symphony, K. 208+102 (Mozart) =

1775 composition by W. A. Mozart

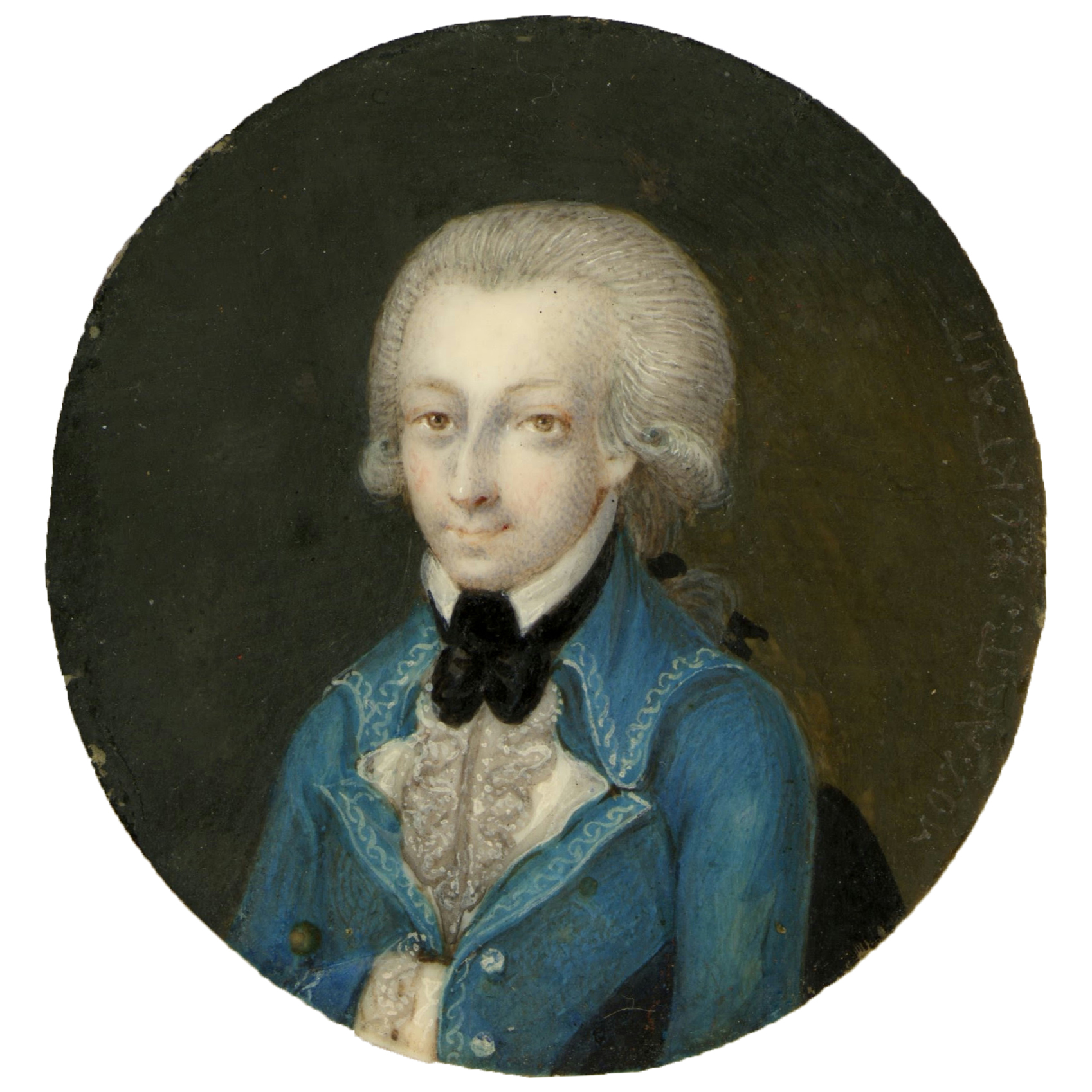
1773 miniature of Mozart

The Symphony in C major "No. 52", K. 208+102, was composed by Wolfgang Amadeus Mozart in 1775. The first two movements are from the opera Il re pastore, K. 208, and the last movement, K. 102/213c, was composed separately. The movements are played one after another without a break.

The Alte Mozart-Ausgabe (published 1879–1882) gives the numbering sequence 1–41 for the 41 numbered symphonies. The unnumbered symphonies (some, including K. 102, published in supplements to the Alte-Mozart Ausgabe until 1910) are sometimes given numbers in the range 42 to 56, even though they were written earlier than Mozart's Symphony No. 41 (written in 1788). The symphony K. 208+102 is given the number 52 in this numbering scheme.

== Music ==
The symphony is scored for two flutes, two oboes, two horns, two trumpets and strings. The flutes are silent for the third movement.

The symphony consists of the following movements:

1. Molto allegro, 4/4
2. Andantino, 6/8
3. Presto assai, 2/4

The first movement is the overture of the opera Il re pastore, while the second movement is the first aria from it, Aminta's "Intendo, amico rio", with the castrato voice replaced by a solo oboe. Eight additional bars were composed to replace the final bar of the aria, so as to allow the movement to lead directly into the third movement. The second movement is not written out completely, and Mozart may have indicated to a copyist to replace the voice with a solo oboe. It was once considered that the March in C, K. 214, might be connected to the final movement, but this hypothesis has been disproven.
