= Or che il dover – Tali e cotanti sono =

1776 concert aria by W. A. Mozart

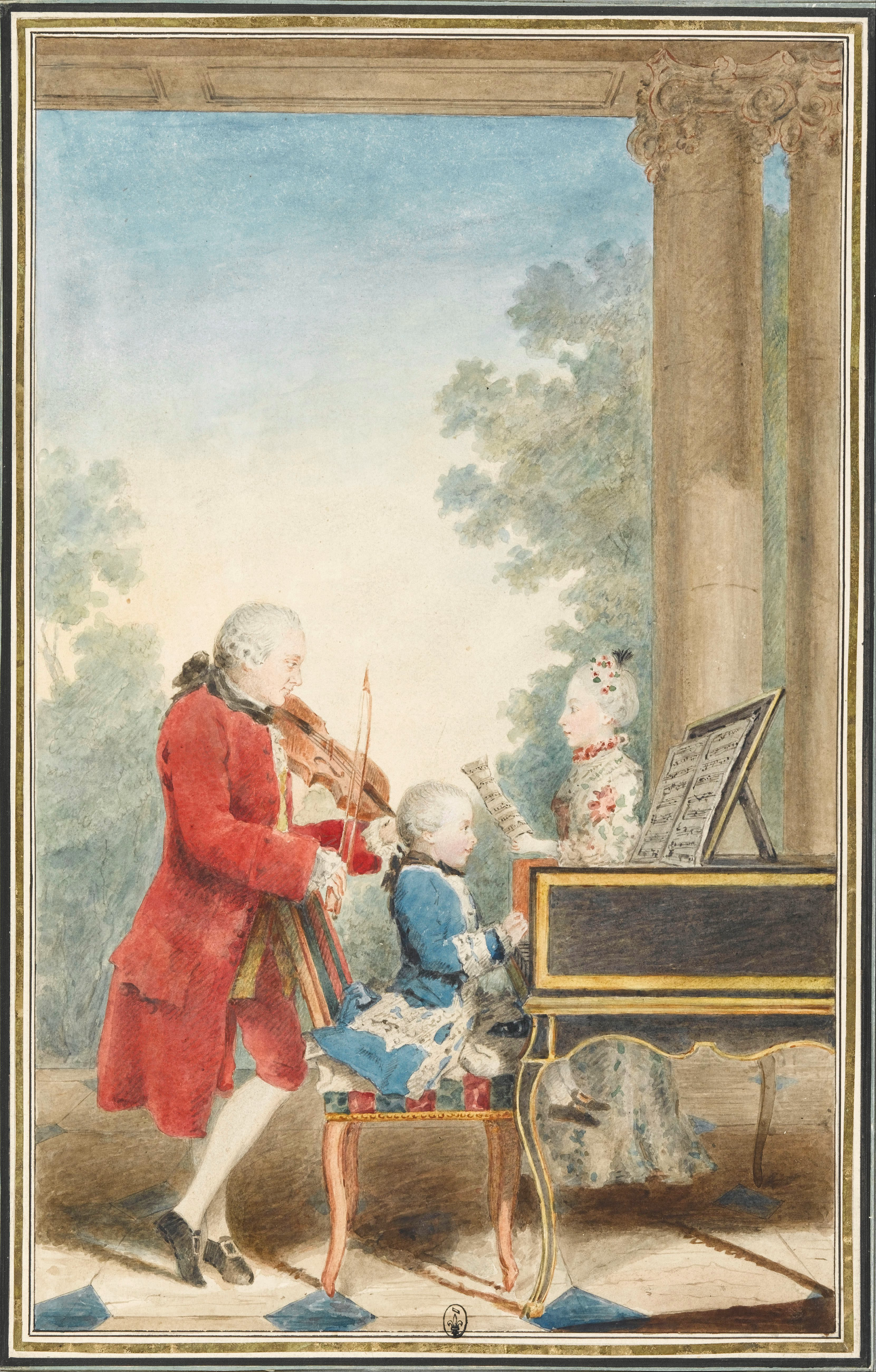
Carmontelle's 1763–64 Mozart family portrait

"Or che il dover – Tali e cotanti sono", K. 36, is a concert aria in D major for tenor and orchestra by Wolfgang Amadeus Mozart.

== Background ==
The aria was written in late 1766 in Salzburg when Mozart was ten years old. The author of the lyrics is unknown. It was the first composition by Mozart since his family's return to Salzburg from their Grand Tour, and was first performed on 21 December 1766 as part of an entertainment marking the anniversary of the installation as archbishop of Sigismund von Schrattenbach.

The work is scored for two oboes, two bassoons, two horns in D, two trumpets in D, timpani, strings and tenor. It is Mozart's first use of trumpets and drums.

== Libretto ==
The aria is performed as a licenza, a tribute to a patron on a festive occasion. The text given to Mozart used the abbreviation Riv^{o} for riverendo throughout, and Mozart set the music for this single syllable. When sung, some rewriting of Mozart's rhythm is required to accommodate the extra syllables.

Or che il dover m'astringe,
In scelte e corte rime
Grato mostrarmi a qual onor sublime,
Di cui ci ricolmaste, o prence eccelso,
Ne' miei pensieri immerso
Ricerco un buon concetto.

Rumino colla mente,
Penso, ripenso, e poi non trovo niente.
Febo e le Muse in mio soccorso imploro;
Compariscono tutte a me dinanzi,
Confuse in volto e colle cetre infrante.

D'un simile scompiglio
Le chiedo la ragion, tacer le miro,
E dopo mille al più sospir cocenti
Una così ripose:
Riverendo pastor, t'accheta, e in simil
Giorno non obbligarci a dire il nostro
Scorno; sulle rive della Salza ogni
Nostro potere, ogni saper fu crine
Da quella luce onde il suo prence è cinto.

Tali e contanti sono
Di Sigismondo i merti,
Che i nostri ingegni incerti,
Non sanno qual riverendo cor.

Se la pietà si canta;
La giustizia non cede,
Ch'ogni virtù, riverendo,
Siede in trono suo cor.

Now that duty compels me,
in select and brief verses,
to show my gratitude for that eminent honour
with which you have overwhelmed us, august prince,
I delve deep into my thoughts
for an inspiration.

I rack my brains,
consider, reflect, but find nothing
I involve Phoebus and the muses to my aid;
they all appear before me
shamefaced and with broken lyres.

I ask the reason
for such confusion, and see them mute;
and after a thousand or so burning sighs
one thus replies:
Revered shepard, be appeased, and on such a day
do not force us to confess our shame.
On the banks of the Salzach,
all our power, all our wisdom was as nothing
to that light with which your prince is surrounded.

So great and so many
are Sigismund's merits
that our paltry minds
cannot know that illustrious heart.

If this compassion is hymned,
it is not at the expense of his justice,
for every virtue, Excellency,
is enthroned in your heart.
