= Mass in D major, K. 194 =

This mass was published 5 years after Mozart's death in 1791

Missa brevis in D major
- Mass by W. A. Mozart
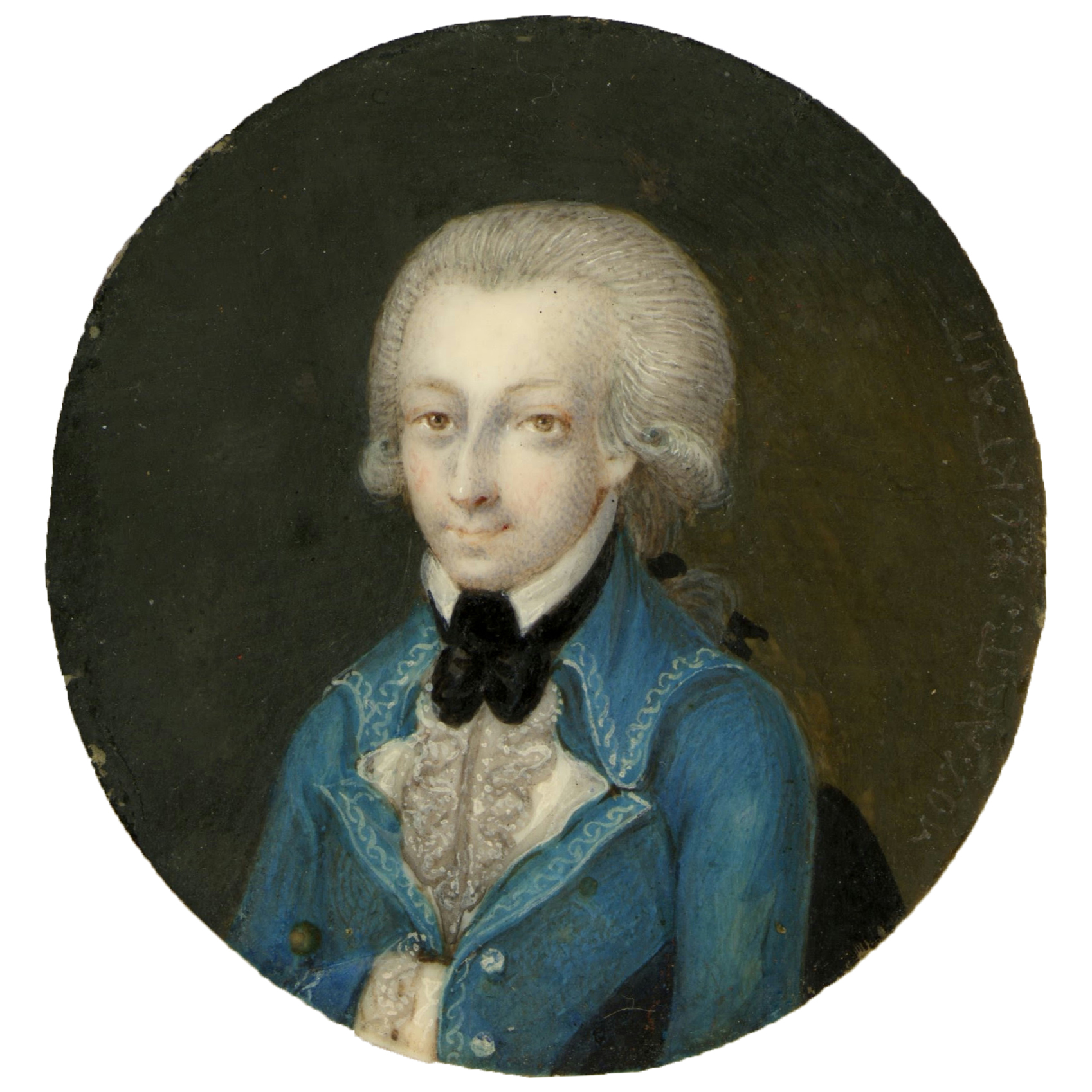
- 1773 miniature of Mozart
- Key: D major
- Catalogue: K. 194/186h
- Composed: 1774: Salzburg
- Published: 1793
- Movements: 6
- Vocal: SATB choir and soloists
- Instrumental: brass; strings; continuo

The Missa brevis in D major, K. 194/186h, is a mass composed by Wolfgang Amadeus Mozart and completed on 8 August 1774. It is scored for SATB soloists, SATB choir, violin I and II, 3 trombones colla parte, and basso continuo.

This missa brevis is thought to have been composed for ordinary liturgical use in the Salzburg Cathedral, under the directive of Archbishop Colloredo. Mozart tried to satisfy Colloredo's demands for brevity and concision in the composition of this mass – none of the movements have an orchestral prelude, the orchestra itself is highly reduced, there is very little fugal writing, and much of the setting is homophonic. In 1793, the Lotter house published the mass posthumously; it was the first of Mozart's masses to appear in print.

The mass consists of six movements. Performances require approximately 15 minutes.

1. Kyrie Andante, D major, 4/4
2. Gloria Allegro moderato, D major, 4/4
3. Credo Allegro, D major, 3/4
  "Et incarnatus est" Andante moderato, D major, 4/4
  "Et resurrexit" Allegro, D major, 3/4
4. Sanctus Andante, D major, 4/4
  "Pleni sunt coeli et terra" Allegro, D major, 3/4
5. Benedictus Andante ma non troppo, G major, 4/4
  "Hosanna in excelsis" Allegro, D major, 3/4
6. Agnus Dei Andante, B minor → D major, 3/4
  "Dona nobis pacem" Allegro, D major, 4/4
