= Mozart Monument =

Mozart Monument. Mozart Memorial or Mozartdenkmal may refer to a number of monuments to Wolfgang Amadeus Mozart:

- The Mozart Monument (Vienna), in the Austrian city of Vienna where Mozart spent much of his life
- The Mozart Monument (Salzburg), in the Austrian city of Salzburg where Mozart was born
- The Mozart Monument (Frankfurt am Main), in the German city of Frankfurt am Main
- The Mozart Monument (Baku), in the Azerbaijani city of Baku
- The statue of Wolfgang Amadeus Mozart, London, in the city where Mozart composed his first two symphonies
- The Beethoven–Haydn–Mozart Memorial, in the German city of Berlin
