= Statue of Wolfgang Amadeus Mozart, London =

Statue in London, England

Coordinates: 51.4908°N 0.1529°W

Wolfgang Amadeus Mozart
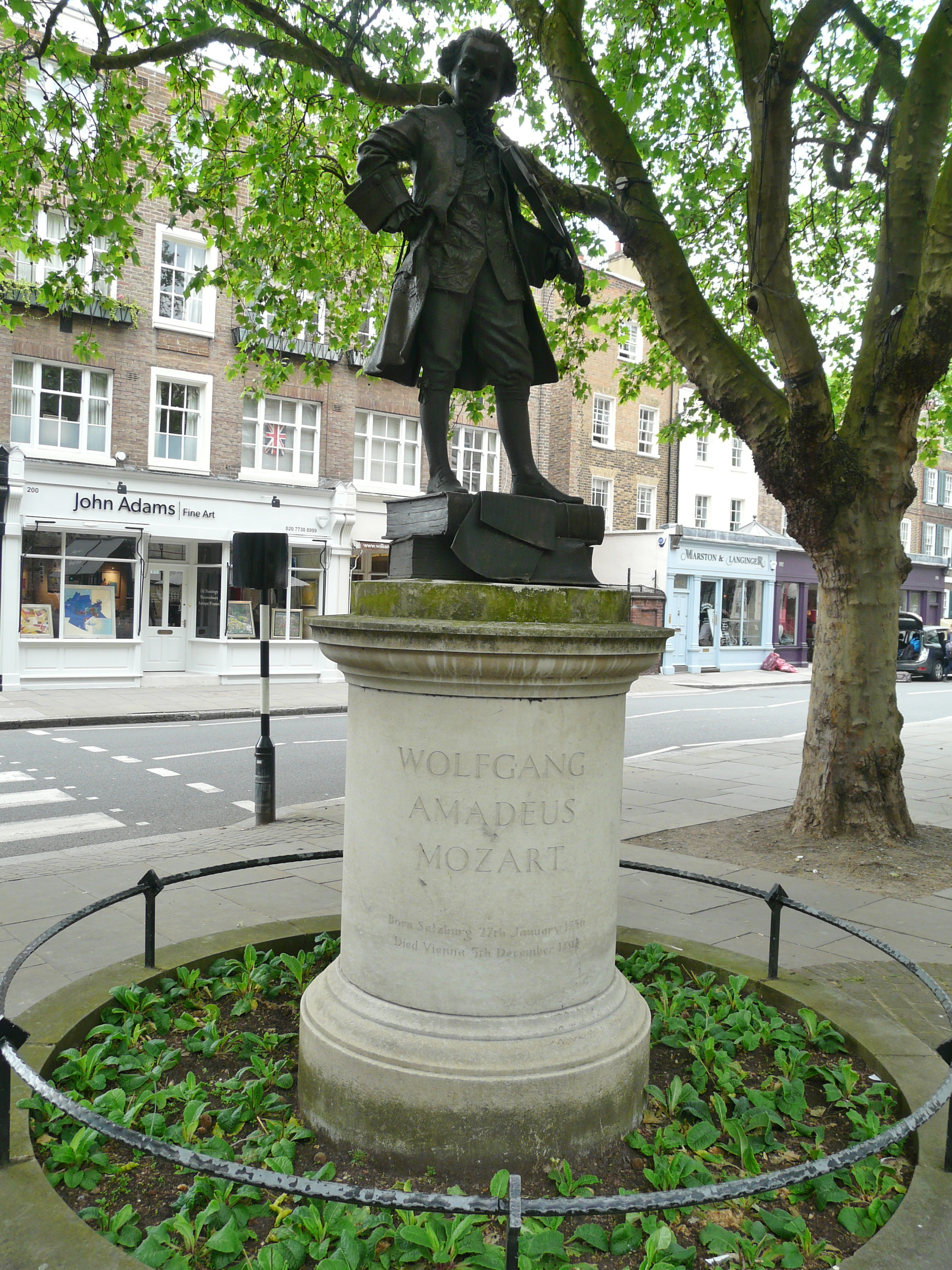
- Artist: Philip Jackson
- Completion date: 1994
- Subject: Wolfgang Amadeus Mozart
- Location: London

The statue of Wolfgang Amadeus Mozart is a statue on Orange Square in Belgravia, London. It stands near 180 Ebury Street where Mozart briefly lived and composed his first symphony.

During the Mozart family grand tour, Mozart lived for 15 months in London aged eight. Originally, the Mozart family had been staying in Leicester Square but decided to move out to the, at the time, more rural setting of Ebury Street.

The statue depicts Mozart at a young age holding a violin and standing on some books. Its design is by Philip Jackson and was unveiled in 1994 by Princess Margaret.
