= Sonata for piano four-hands =

Sonata for piano four-hands may refer to:

- Sonata in C major for keyboard four-hands, K. 19d (Mozart)
- Sonata in C major for piano four-hands, K. 521 (Mozart)
- Sonata in D major for piano four-hands, Op. 6 (Beethoven)
- Sonata in B-flat major for piano four-hands, D 617 (Schubert)
- Sonata in C major for piano four-hands, D 812 (Schubert)
- Sonata for piano, four hands (Shapero)

== See also ==
- List of compositions for piano duo
