= 180 Ebury Street =

Former home of Wolfgang Amadeus Mozart in London, England

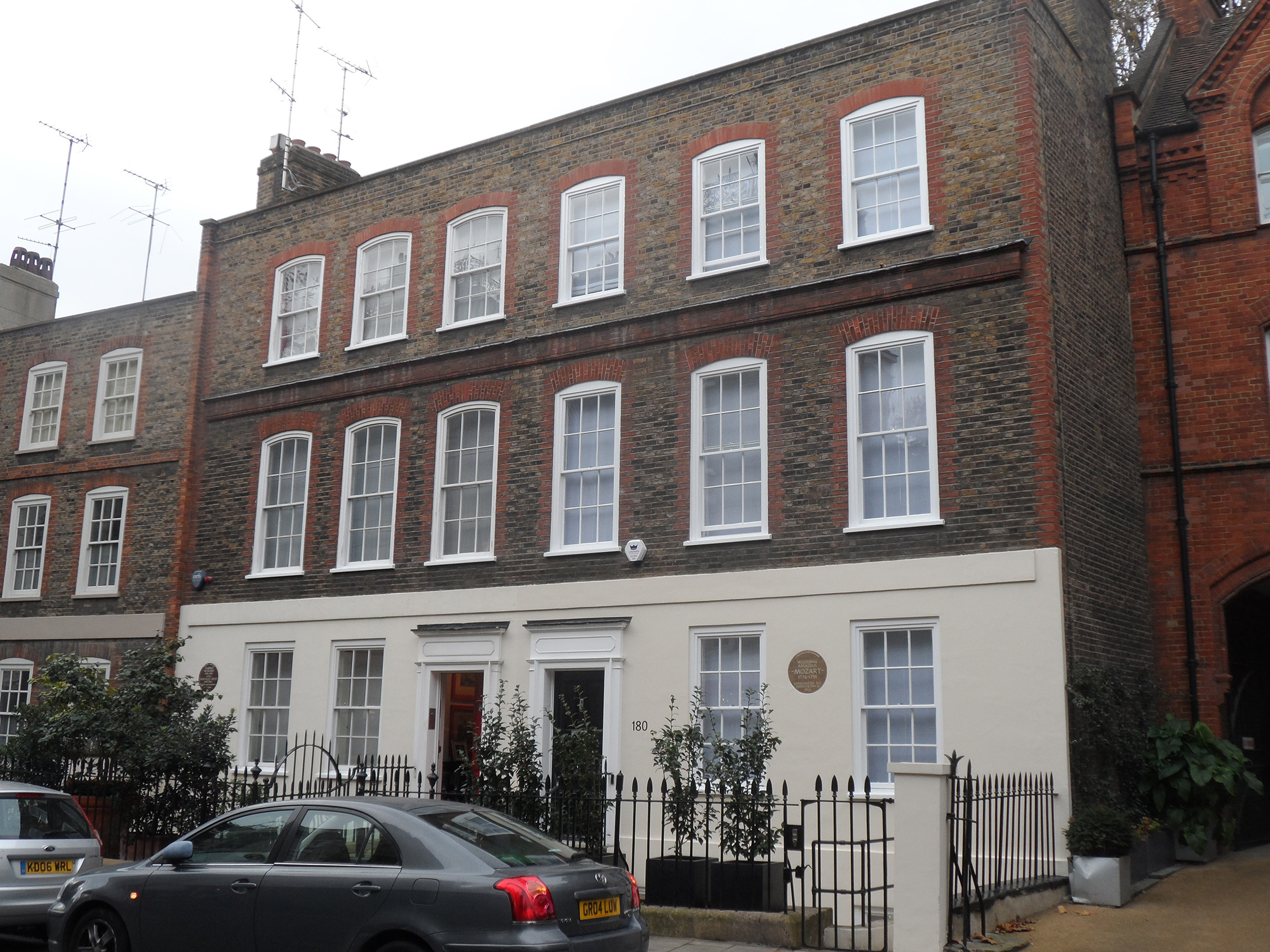
- 180 Ebury Street

- Location within Central London
- 51°29′29″N 0°09′09″W
- OS grid reference: TQ 28353 78563

Listed Building – Grade I
- Official name: 180 Ebury Street, SW1
- Designated: 24 February 1958
- Reference no.: 1211215

180 Ebury Street in the Belgravia district of London was the home of the composer Wolfgang Amadeus Mozart and his family from 5 August 1764 to 24 September 1764 during the Mozart family's grand tour of Europe.

The house was built in the early to mid-eighteenth century as part of a terrace. Mozart composed his first symphony here in 1764. The house has been listed at Grade I due to its association with Mozart.

The building is now marked with a London County Council plaque placed in 1939 to commemorate Mozart's residence. The plaque was re-erected in 1951 following damage in the Second World War.

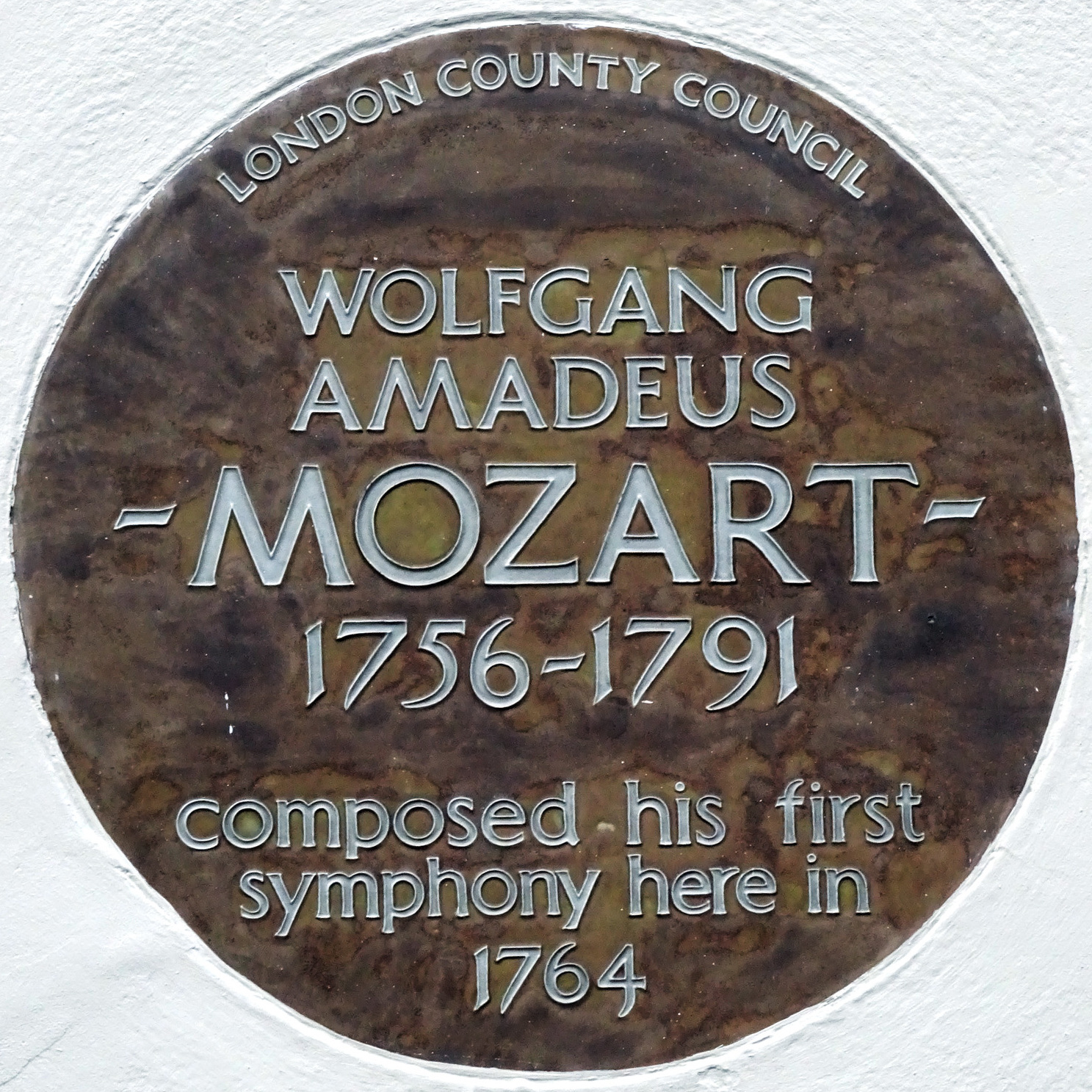
The plaque marking Mozart's residence

== See also ==
- Mozarthaus Vienna
- 20 Frith Street
