= Symphony No. 5 (Mozart) =

1765 symphony by W. A. Mozart

- by W. A. Mozart
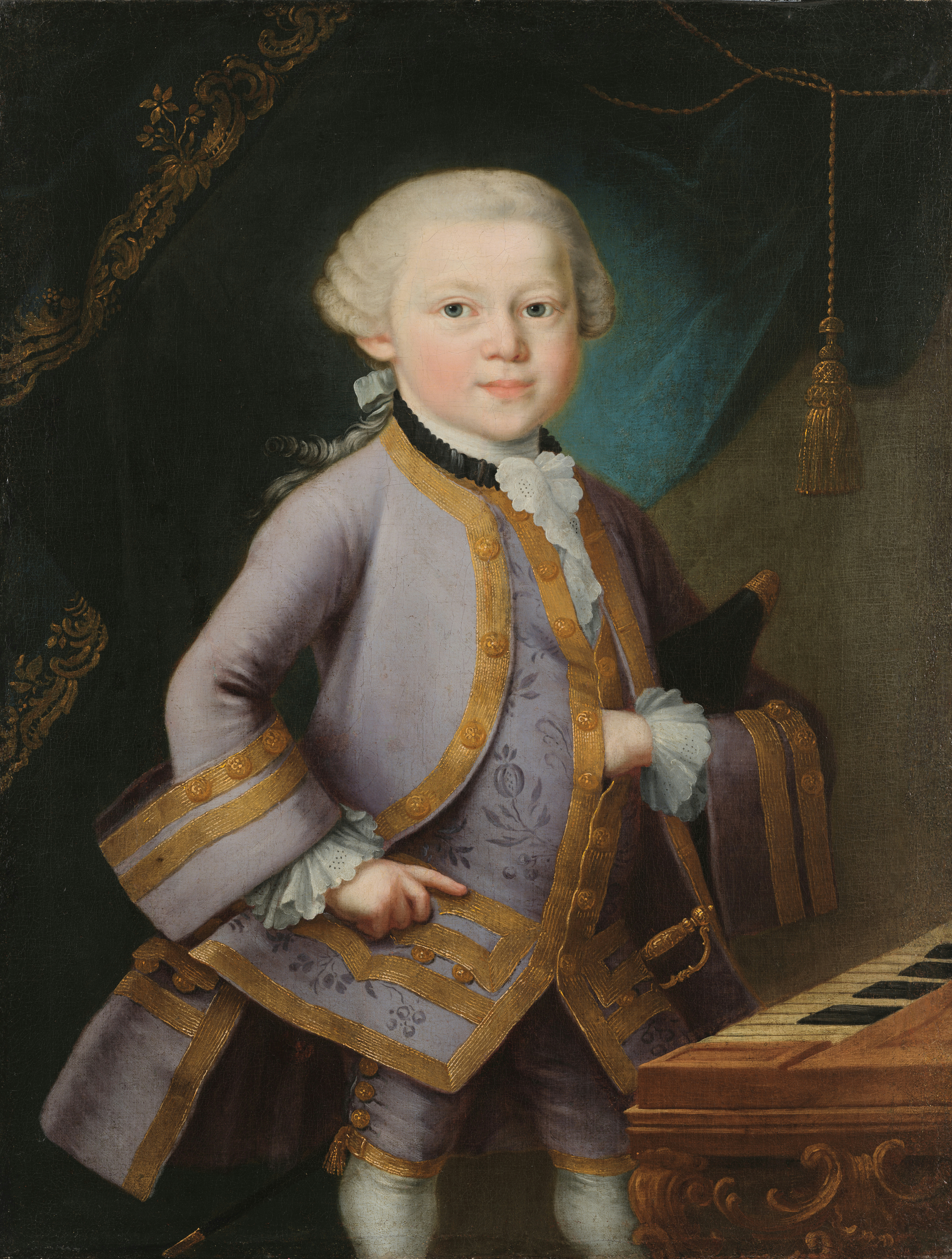
- Mozart at the time he composed the symphony
- Key: B♭ major
- Catalogue: K. 22
- Composed: December 1765, The Hague
- Duration: 8 minutes
- Movements: 3
- Scoring: Orchestra with continuo

The Symphony No. 5 in B♭ major, K. 22, was composed by Wolfgang Amadeus Mozart in The Hague in December 1765, at the age of nine, while he was on his musical tour of Western Europe. Mozart fell seriously ill during his stay in The Hague, and he wrote this symphony probably while he was convalescing from his illness.

It is Mozart's shortest symphony, lasting only 8 minutes – one minute less than his 32nd which lasts 9 minutes.

== Music ==
The symphony is scored for two oboes, two horns in B♭, strings, and basso continuo.

The form is that of a three-movement Italian overture:

1. Allegro,
2. Andante, 2/4 (in G minor)
3. Molto allegro, 3/8

All three movements are coloured especially prominently by horns. A rousing first movement in the key of B♭ major opens the symphony, followed by a more solemn, mournful movement in the relative key of G minor. A short, boisterous finale closes the work. The opening theme to the finale is borrowed from the finale to keyboard concerto by Johann Christian Bach whom Mozart had met the previous year in London. The same theme would also appear in a much later, more mature work of Mozart's: the act 2 finale of his 1786 opera buffa, Le nozze di Figaro, K. 492.

== Discography ==
Below is an incomplete list of recordings of the symphony:

Year	Conductor	Orchestra	Label
1973	Neville Marriner	Academy of St. Martin in the Fields	Philips Classics
1991	Charles Mackerras	Prague Chamber Orchestra	Telarc
1995	Nicholas Ward	Northern Chamber Orchestra	Naxos
2013	Ádám Fischer	Danish National Chamber Orchestra	Dacapo Records
