= Mozart Monument (Frankfurt am Main) =

Monument in Frankfurt am Main, Germany, Austria

Mozart Monument, Frankfurt am Main
- Mozart-Denkmal
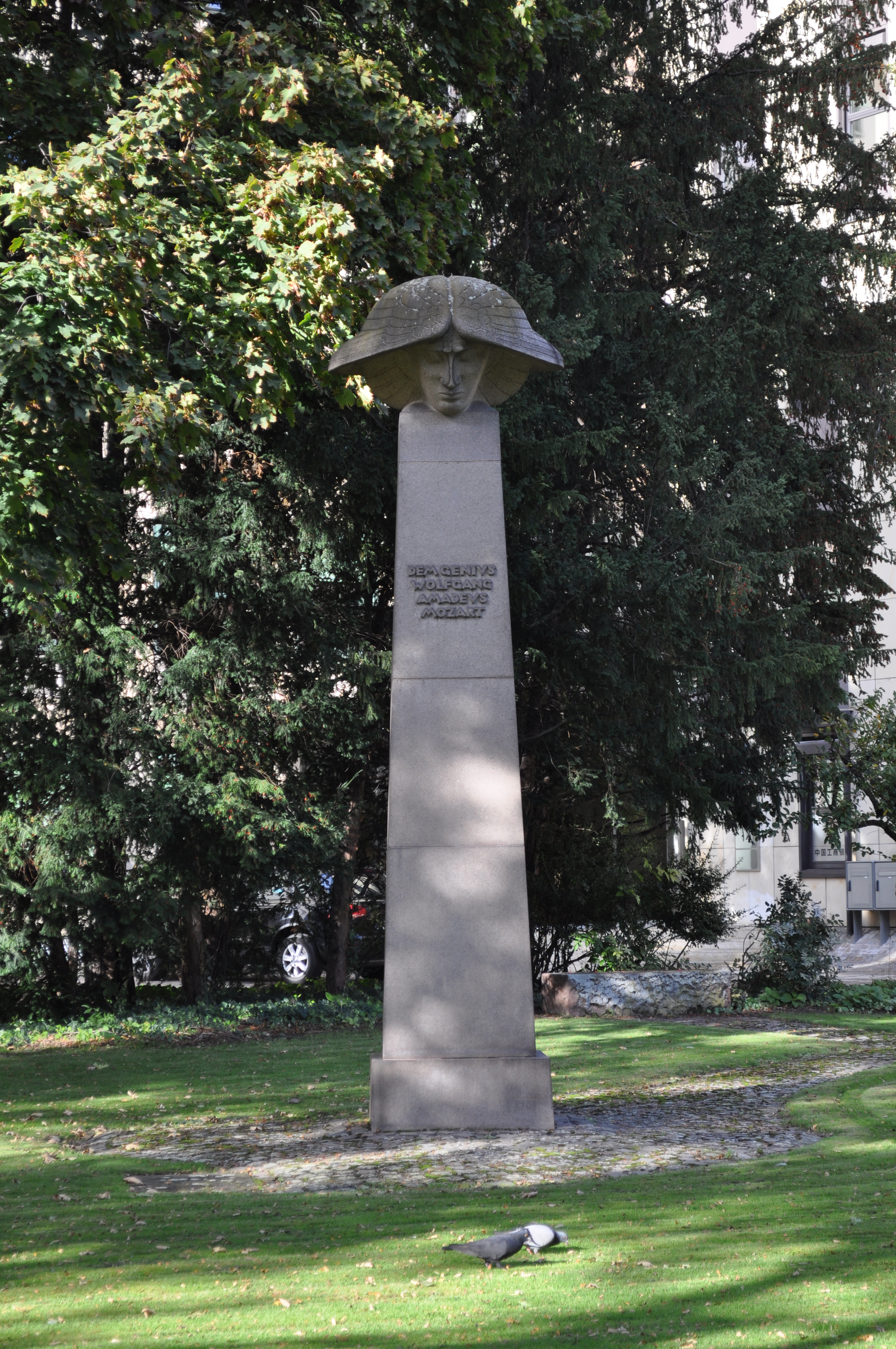
- Interactive map of Mozart Monument, Frankfurt am Main
- Location: Mozartplatz
- Coordinates: 50°07′02″N 8°40′29″E
- Designer: Gerhard Marcks
- Type: Statue
- Material: Swedish granite
- Height: Over 4.9 m
- Dedicated to: Wolfgang Amadeus Mozart

The Mozart Monument (German: Mozart-Denkmal) in Mozartplatz, Frankfurt am Main commemorates the composer Wolfgang Amadeus Mozart.

== History ==
Mozart visited Frankfurt in 1763 as a child, during the Mozart family grand tour of Europe. He also visited in October 1790, when he performed two piano concertos, Nos. 19 and 26 (K. 459 and K. 537), at the time of the coronation of Leopold II as Holy Roman Emperor. None of the buildings associated with his stays has survived, making the monument the only memorial in the city to commemorate his visits.

In 1913, Georg Bäumler created a Mozart Monument in Frankfurt based on a design by K. Krüger. However, it was completely destroyed by Allied air raids on Frankfurt during the Second World War. After the war, a new monument was erected. On 11 May 1963, the 200th anniversary of the composer's first visit, the new Mozart Monument, created by Gerhard Marcks, was unveiled in Mozartplatz in front of the building at Bockenheimer Anlage 15.

== Description ==
The monument consists of a column over 4.90 meters high, topped by a bust wearing a winged hat. The hat has a wingspan of 1.45 meters. Swedish granite was used in its construction. The monument bears the inscription "To the Genius Wolfgang Amadeus Mozart".

== Location ==
The Mozart Monument is located on Mozartplatz, a small square in the Innenstadt of Frankfurt. The square takes its name from the monument itself, and the immediate streetscape includes residential and commercial buildings along the Bockenheimer Anlage.
