= Piece in F for Keyboard, K. 33B (Mozart) =

1766 piano composition by W. A. Mozart

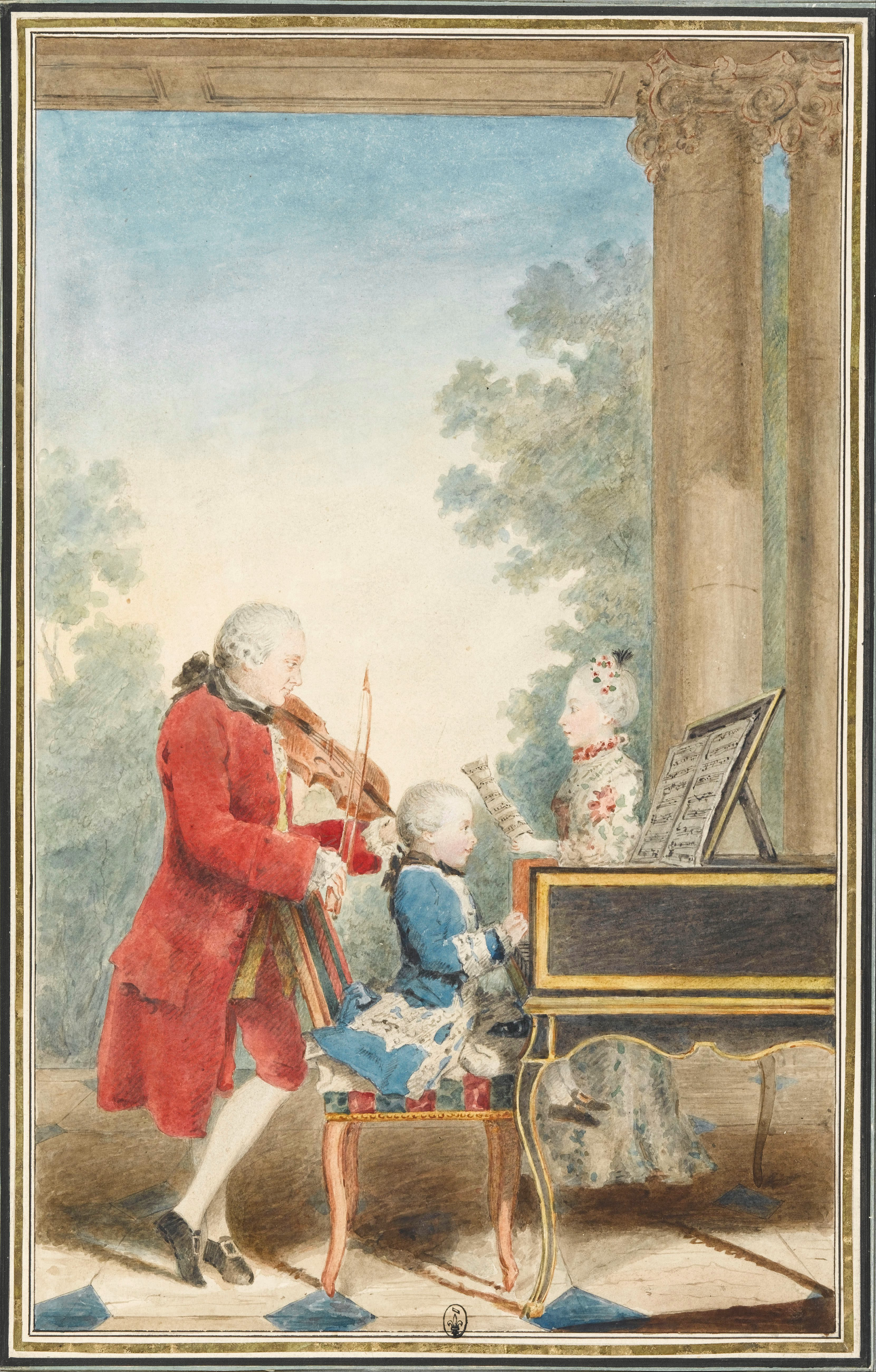
Carmontelle's 1763–64 Mozart family portrait

The Klavierstück in F (Piece in F for keyboard), K. 33B/Anh.A 6, is a keyboard work written by Wolfgang Amadeus Mozart sometime during early October 1766; its tempo marking is Allegro. It is 26 bars long, divided into two sections of 12 and 14 bars, each repeated. It is suspected to be an arrangement of work by another composer.

Mozart wrote this piece in pencil on the back of a circular by the Zürcher Musikkollegium (Zurich Music College) dated 30 September 1766, when the Mozart family came to the end of their Grand Tour. The circular invited sponsors, music lovers and other people who might be interested to concerts by "the young (9 years old) Master Mozart as well as his maiden sister" (Maria Anna – Nannerl) on October 7 and 9. It can be assumed that Mozart played or improvised this lively piece in one of those concerts, the programs to which are lost. Mozart wrote it on the back of the circular probably as a souvenir for the college's board; otherwise he would have used his sister's notebook or his third book of sketches (Skizzenbuch), which is also lost. The autograph became known very late (in 1942), and so is missing from Alfred Einstein's 3rd edition of the Köchel catalogue.

This piece appeared shortened in the 1984 film Amadeus, when the child Mozart played it blindfolded on the harpsichord.
