= Ebury Street =

Street in Belgravia, London

Coordinates: 51.4944°N 0.1489°W

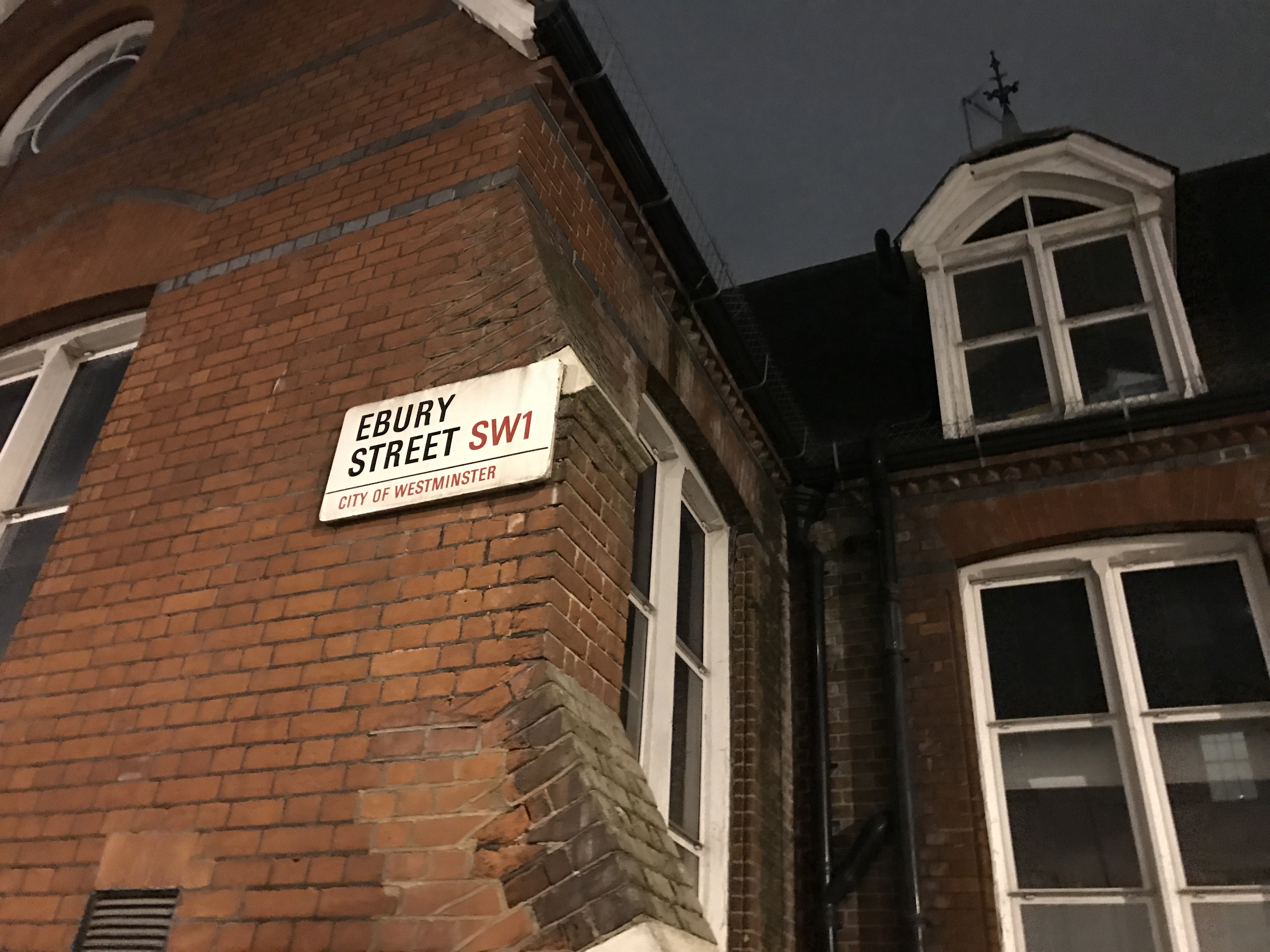
Ebury Street

Ebury Street (/ˈiːbəri/) is a street in Belgravia, City of Westminster, London. It runs from a Grosvenor Gardens junction south-westwards to Pimlico Road. It was built mostly in the period 1815 to 1860.

Odd numbers 19 to 231 are on the south-east side; the others, 16 to 230, are opposite. Numbers 2 to 14 have largely been replaced by a renamed terrace of eight houses known as Lygon Place, recessed behind a small green.

== History ==
A local estate, "Eia", is mentioned in the Domesday Book.

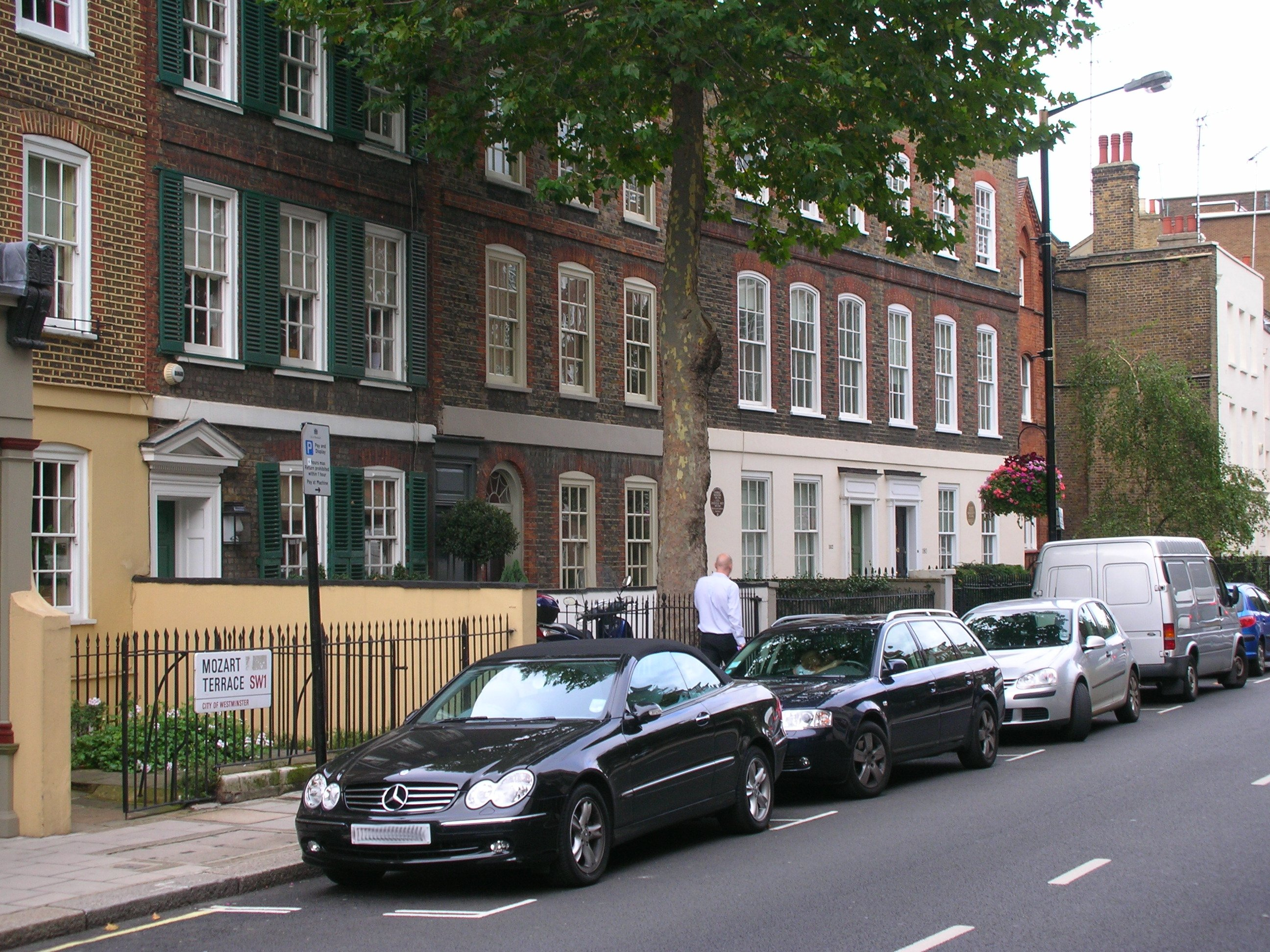
Mozart Terrace

The surviving houses 180–188 were called "Fivefields Row" when Mozart stayed there for a very short time in 1764. Cundy St flats on the south-east side are interesting 1950s mid-rise apartments set back from the road, mainly replacing sections damaged by bombing in the London Blitz. These are due for demolition. This is where Prince Charles spent the night with Camilla Parker Bowles just before his wedding to Diana Spencer

22b Ebury Street was built in 1830 as a Baptist church. It was divided into flats in the 20th century.

Immediately following World War I, number 42 was the workplace or head office of the "Soldiers' Embroidery Industry". Textile bags and workboxes were so-labelled, adding the words "Made by the Totally Disabled", i.e. disabled veterans doing rehabilitation work.

The street contains a number of blue plaques to commemorate former residents.

== Notable buildings ==
Mozart Terrace was in the late 18th century known as Fivefields Row. It can also be numerically addressed as Ebury Street.

=== Niche restaurants ===
La Poule au Pot is an expensive restaurant leased from Grosvenor Estates, below social housing managed by Peabody.

Ken Lo's Memories of China is a restaurant established in 1981 by Ken Lo (d. 2001).

=== Other uses ===
Where Ebury Street meets Pimlico Road is a triangular public paved area with seating and a bronze statue of Mozart (aged 8) by Philip Jackson. The triangle was known for many years as "Pimlico Green" (and still is by older residents) but was renamed Orange Square due to the local pub nearby being called The Orange, the latter reflecting the localised misnomer of "squares" in two notable instances: a very thin rectangle grid with a main road running through its longer bisection forms Eaton Square and Chester Square is likewise more street than green. A minority of houses have been converted to hotels.

Buildings dating from the mid to late 20th century front parts of the street toward either end: Coleshill Flats, Kylestrome House, Kilmuir House (a conversion), and Belgravia Court. Numbers 2 to 14 have largely been replaced by a renamed terrace of eight houses known as Lygon Place, recessed behind a small green (see below).

== Notable residents ==
- Ian Fleming lived from 1934 to 1945 at 22b. (blue plaque)
- In 1847 Alfred Tennyson, 1st Baron Tennyson lived at number 42.
- Noël Coward kept a room at number 111 which his parents had run as a lodging house.
- Isaac Gompertz lived in and died at number 45.
- George Moore lived and died at number 121. (blue plaque)
- Wolfgang Amadeus Mozart lived at "Fivefields Row" from 5 August to 24 September 1764, approximately number 180. (plaque)
- Vita Sackville-West lived with her husband, Harold Nicolson, at number 182. Their son Nigel was born here. (plaque)
- William Downey, photographer (1829–1915), had studios at numbers 57 and 61.
- The photographer Mabel Sophia Clerke, operating as M. Shadwell Clerke, had a studio at 117 Ebury Street in the early 20th century.
- Sid Halley, a fictional character created by author Dick Francis, lives in Ebury Street in Come to Grief (1995).
- The actress Dame Edith Evans lived at number 109. (blue plaque)

== Lygon Place ==
Lygon Place is a terrace of initial-category (Grade II-) listed buildings recessed by a small green and facing the street. The terrace dates from about 1900 and is an Arts and Crafts-influenced design, by Eustace Balfour and Hugh Thackeray Turner. Notable former residents include Freeman Freeman-Thomas, 1st Marquess of Willingdon. Number 5 was a residence of the Italian Air Attaché. Institutions based here included the Margarine and Shortening Manufacturers' Association; the Lion Services Club; and the Institution of Highways and Transportation.

== Gallery ==
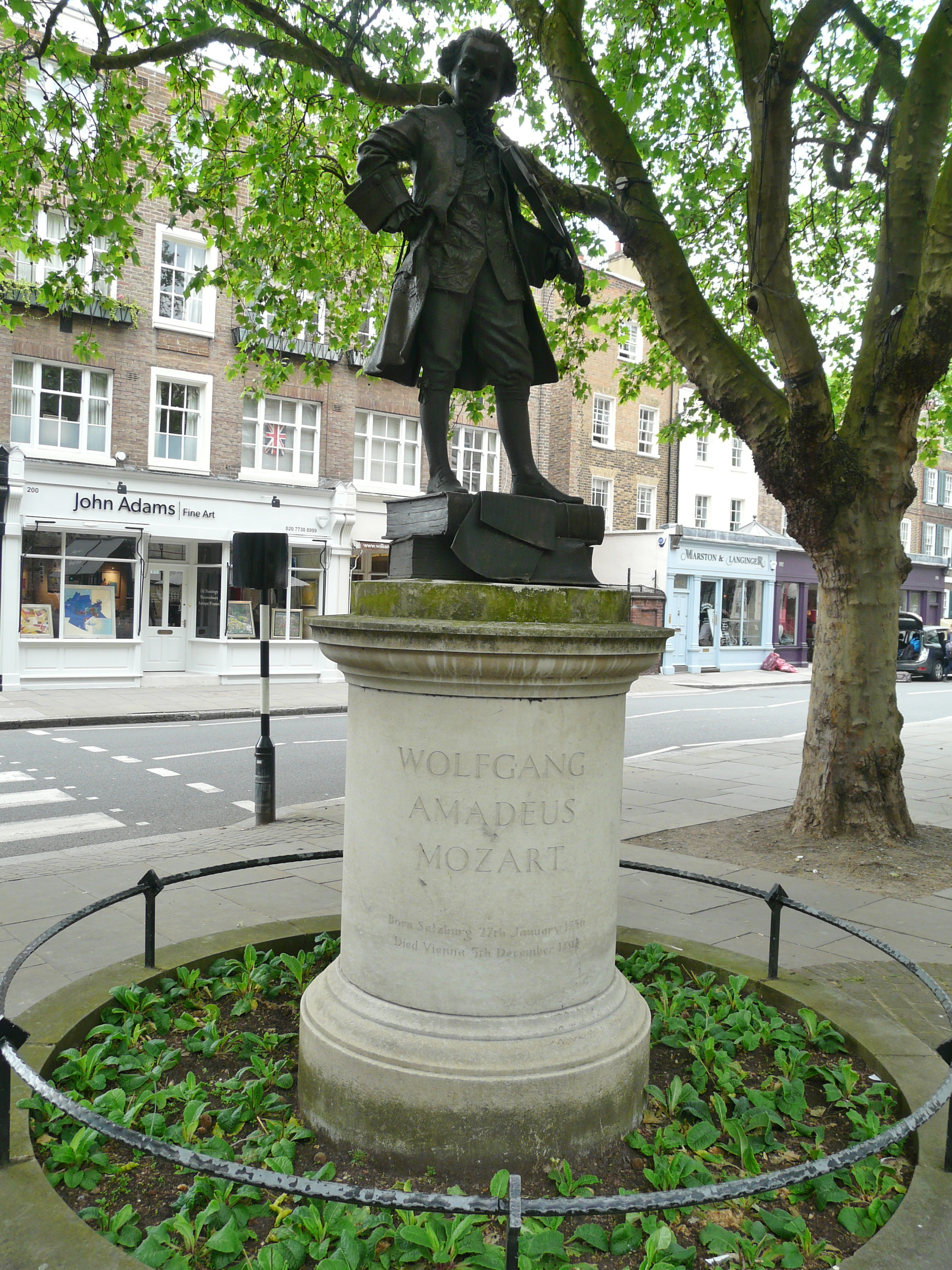
Bronze statue of Mozart

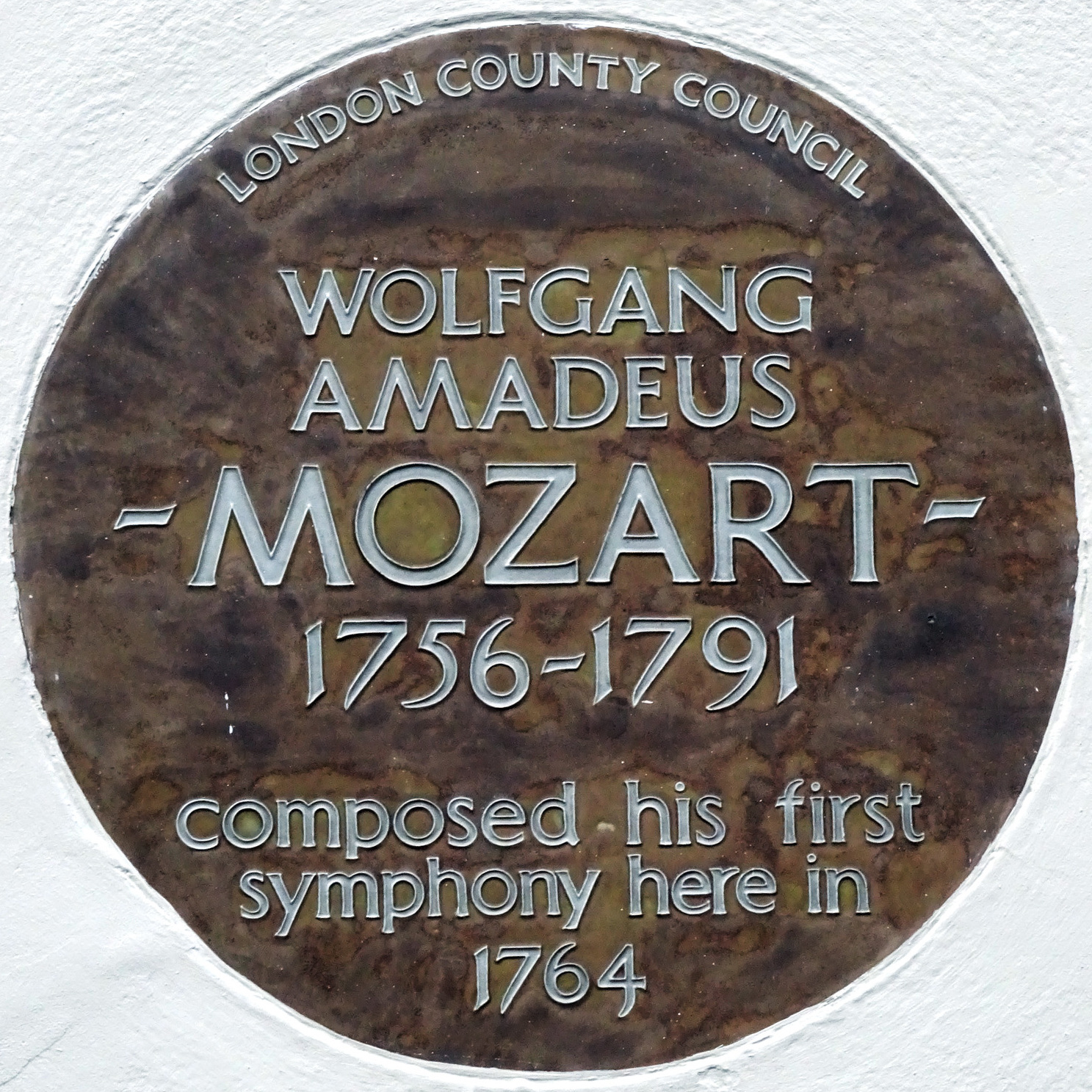
Plaque to Mozart

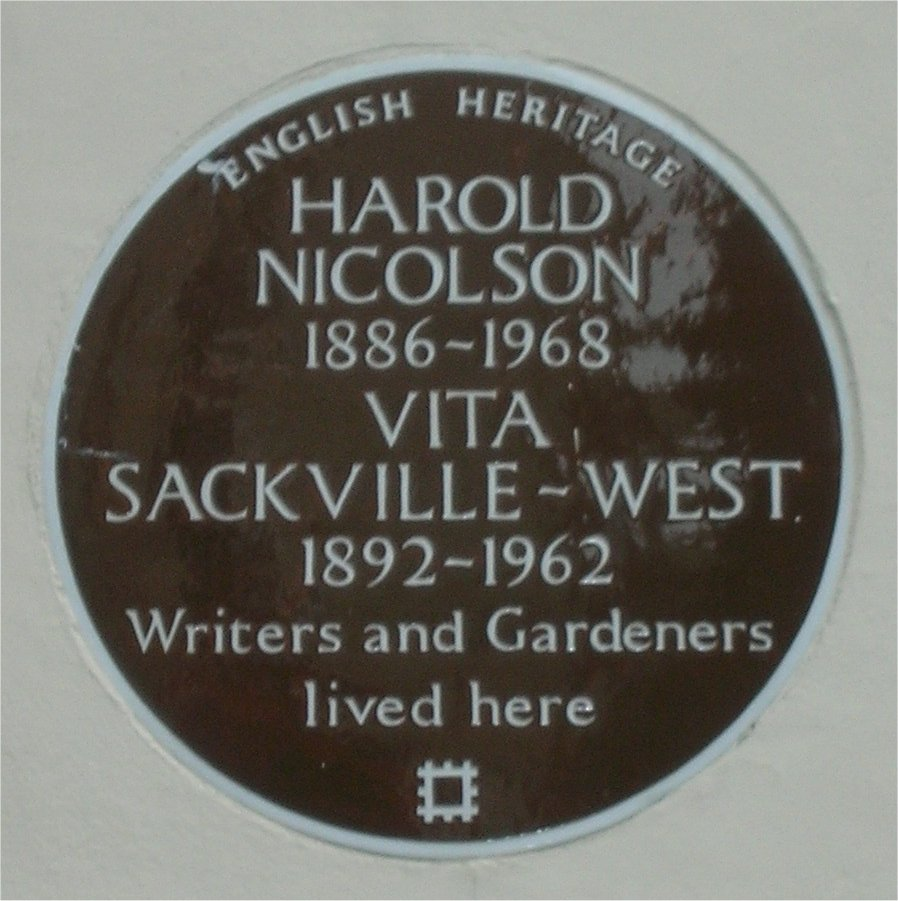
Plaque to Vita Sackville-West and Harold Nicolson
