= Symphony No. 1 (Mozart) =

First symphony (1764) by W. A. Mozart

- by W. A. Mozart
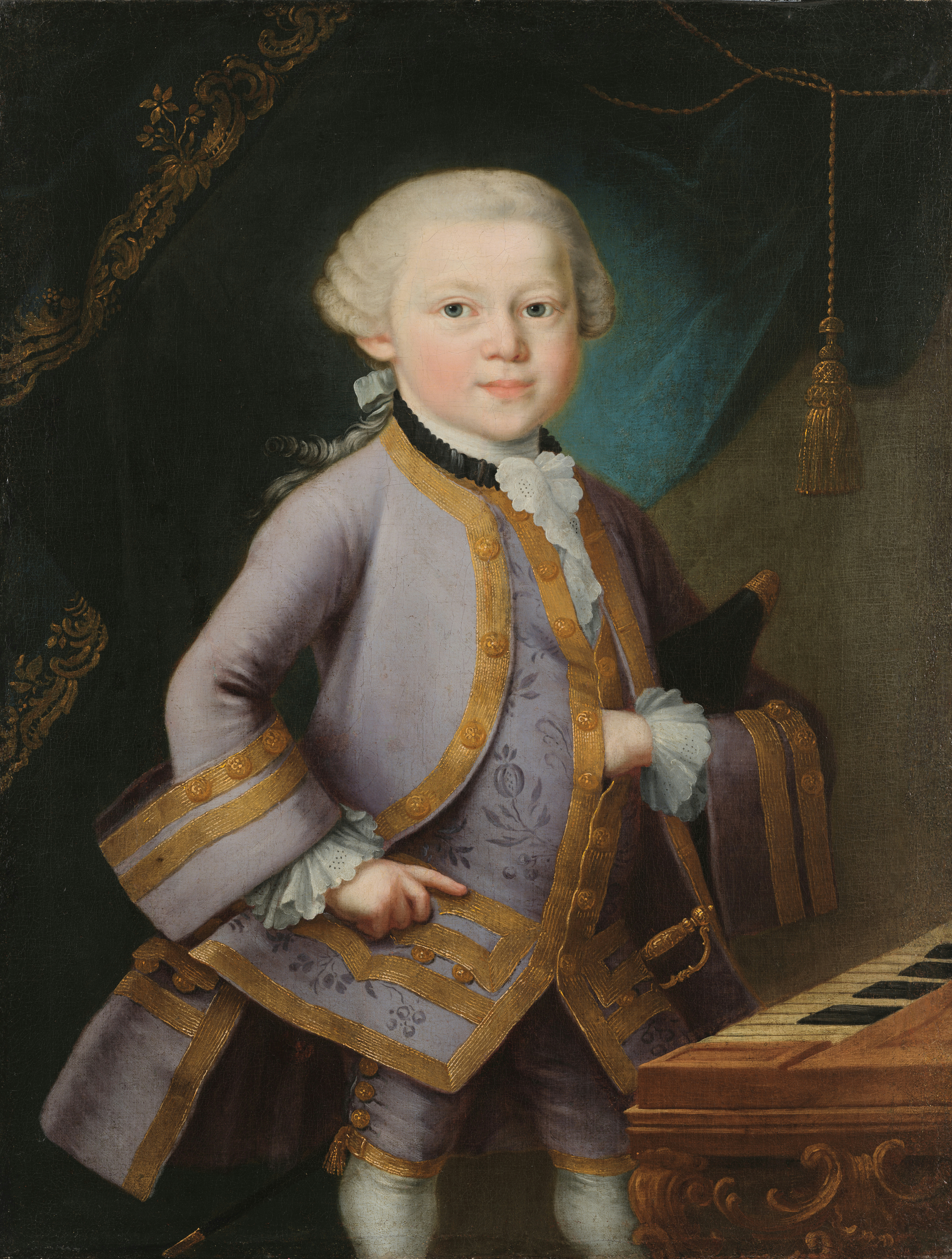
- 1763 portrait of Mozart at age seven, painted before he composed the symphony
- Key: E♭ major
- Catalogue: K. 16
- Composed: August/September 1764, London
- Published: 1879, Leipzig
- Publisher: Breitkopf & Härtel
- Duration: c. 12 minutes
- Movements: 3
- Scoring: Orchestra

Premiere
- Date: 21 February 1765
- Location: Theatre Royal Haymarket, London
- Conductor: Wolfgang Amadeus Mozart

The Symphony No. 1 in E♭ major, K. 16, is Wolfgang Amadeus Mozart's first ever symphony, written in August or September 1764 at the age of only eight. By this time, he was already notable in Europe as a child prodigy (Wunderkind) but had composed little music.

The autograph manuscript of the symphony is today preserved in the Jagiellonian Library in Kraków, Poland.

A typical performance lasts about 12 minutes.

== Background ==
The symphony was written on the Mozart family's Grand Tour of Europe in London when they had to move to Chelsea during the summer of 1764, when Leopold caught a cold on the way home one night, with a severe throat infection. The house at 180 Ebury Street, now in the borough of Westminster, where this symphony was written, is marked with a plaque.

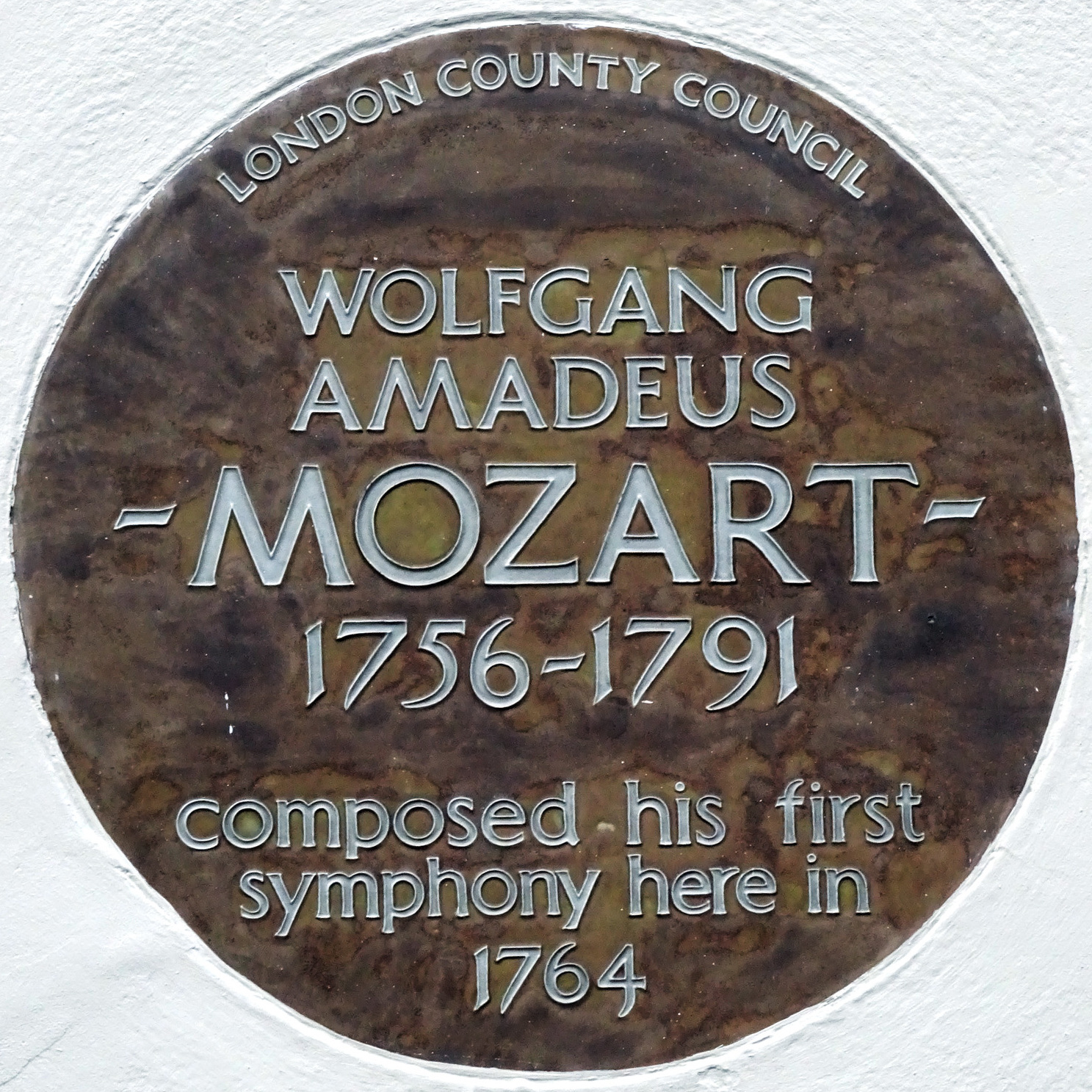
Commemorating plaque at 180 Ebury Street, in Belgravia

Leopold was seriously ill and for his recovery demanded total silence with absolutely no noise to be made anywhere in the house, not even music. He forbade anyone from touching the keyboard, according to a recall by Nannerl made in her later years, so Mozart occupied himself by composing the symphony silently in his mind.

The symphony was first performed on 21 February 1765 at the Little Theatre, Haymarket, directed by Mozart himself, in a concert given by him and Nannerl. It shows the influence of several composers, including his father and the sons of J. S. Bach, especially Johann Christian, an important early symphonist working in London whom Mozart had met during his time there.

== Music ==
The symphony is scored for two oboes, two horns in E♭, and strings.

The work is in three movements:

1. Molto allegro,
2. Andante, C minor, 2/4
3. Presto, 3/8

=== I. Molto allegro ===
The first movement opens with an exuberant unison fanfare; it is then answered quietly by a gentler accompanied passage accompanied by the basso continuo. The contrast between loud and soft passages here provides the movement's principal character.

(complete movement, MIDI-based rendition)

In his book on the piano concertos, Cuthbert Girdlestone pointed out the similarity between the opening of this symphony and that of the Piano Concerto No. 22, K. 482, composed some twenty years later.

=== II. Andante ===
(complete movement, MIDI-based rendition)

In the second movement, bars 7ff, Mozart uses the four note motif C–D–F–E which appeared in several of his later works, including his symphonies 33 and 41 "Jupiter", specifically the fourth movement of the latter. The horns play this theme above a slow, heavy bass line which likely reflects his concern for his father's severe illness. Marc Rochester suggests that shivering strings remind listeners of the cold English winter weather under which the symphony was composed.

=== III. Presto ===
The exuberant brief closing movement of the symphony, dominated by the horns and violins, according to Rochester, reflects the young Mozart's inability to stay serious for long. The strings play a brief unison figure exploring chromaticism, which audiences at the time found questionable.

(complete movement, MIDI-based rendition)

== Discography ==
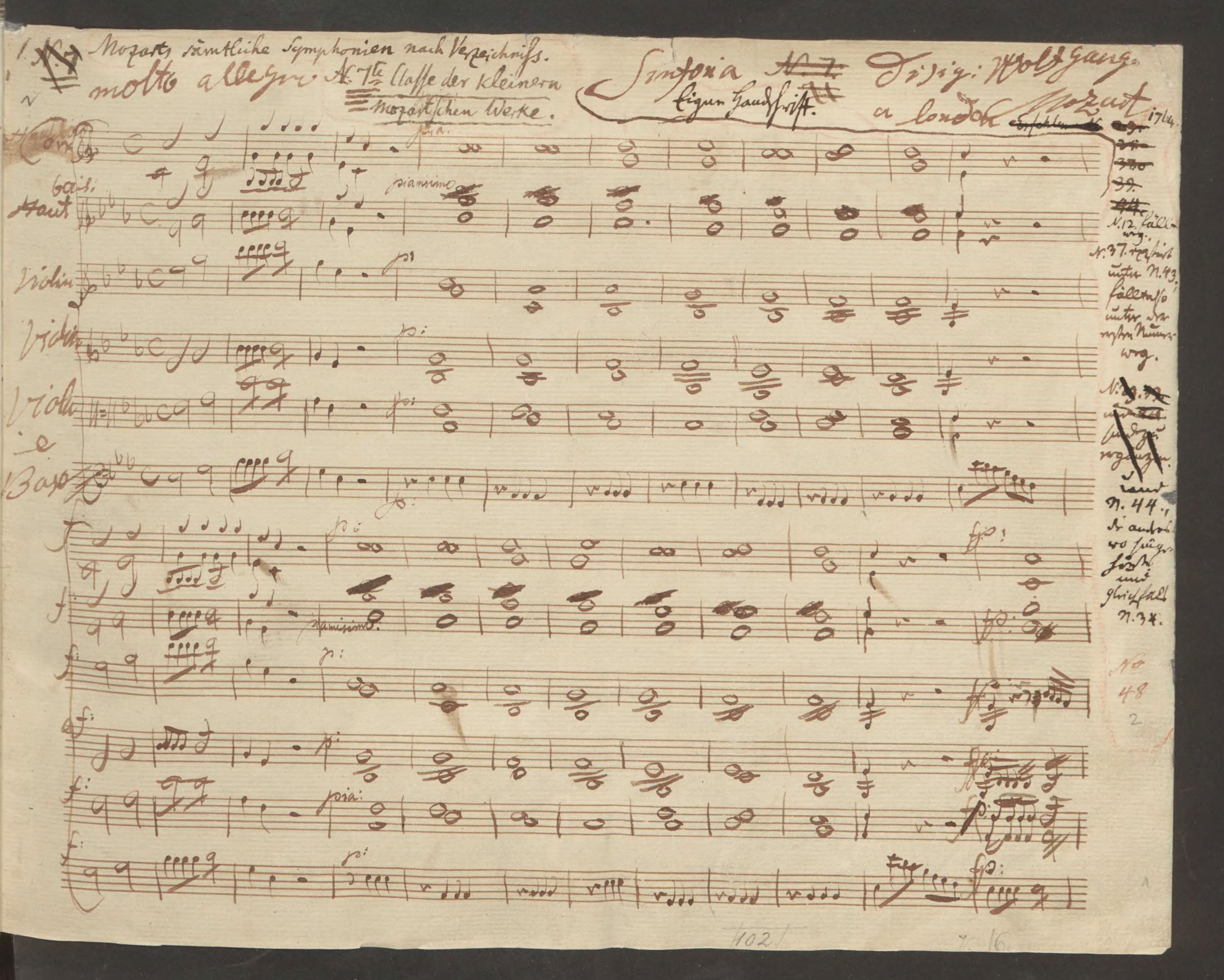
First page of the autograph manuscript

Year	Conductor	Orchestra	Label
1973	Neville Marriner	Academy of St. Martin in the Fields	Philips Classics
1991	Charles Mackerras	Prague Chamber Orchestra	Telarc
1992	James Levine	Vienna Philharmonic	Deutsche Grammophon
1995	Nicholas Ward	Northern Chamber Orchestra	Naxos
2005	Klaus Tennstedt	Bavarian Radio Symphony Orchestra	Profil Medien
2013	Ádám Fischer	Danish National Chamber Orchestra	Dacapo Records
2018	Ian Page	The Mozartists	Signum Records
2024	Luca Bertazzi	Chamber orchestra of the Conservatory of Music "Lucio Campiani", Mantua	Conservatory of Music "Lucio Campiani", Mantua
