= Sonata in C major for keyboard four-hands, K. 19d =

The Sonata in C major, K. 19d, is a work for piano four-hands once thought to be composed by Wolfgang Amadeus Mozart in 1765 when he was nine years old in England. Composed in the traditional sonata form, it is one of the very few works thought to be written by Mozart for four-handed play.

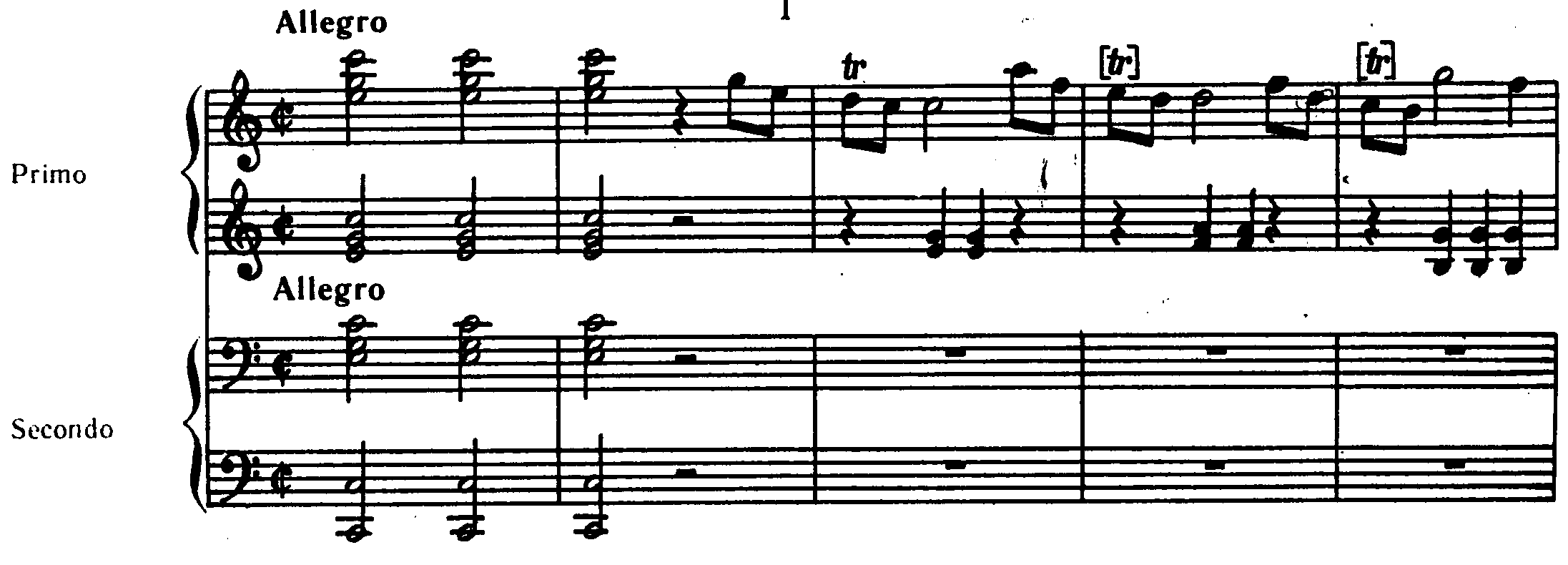
Start of the Allegro of K. 19d

== Form ==
The sonata consists of three movements:

1. Allegro moderato
2. Menuetto and Trio
3. Rondo: Allegretto

=== Allegro moderato ===
The first movement, 107 bars long and in common time, begins with a strong triple-playing of a C major chord. In typical sonata form, the work presents its main theme, and develops upon it. Toward the middle section (bar 40), the work drops down in tone to a darker, more ominous version of the main theme, before picking back up to the light C major chord.

=== Menuetto and Trio ===
The second movement is 54 bars long and in 3/4 time, sounding very much like an Andante. The opening minuet consists of 26 bars before transitioning to a trio, lasting a mere eight bars, which repeats and then closes with the finished minuet. It is written in a very typical 18th-century minuet fashion.

=== Rondo: Allegretto ===
The final movement, 181 bars long and in 2/4 time, begins with a modulating chord phrase that is as much joyful as it is exciting. It can almost be likened to that of the final theme of Mozart's own "Gran Partita", K. 370a – 7. Finale. At bar 142, the movement switches from an ever-exciting allegretto, to a slow adagio in 3/4 time lasting for 19 bars, before finally switching back to the rondo's main theme in 2/4 time at Allegro. The movement is in a standard sonata rondo form.

== Authenticity ==
Discovered in 1921, the two printed versions of the work that have been found were found in Paris and London, both of them being dated to sometime in 1789. It was possibly composed during the Mozarts' London tour in 1765. On 13 May 1765, Mozart and his sister, Nannerl, reportedly played an authentic original Mozart composition on a two-manual harpsichord in Hickford's Great Room, Brewer Street, with reports such as "the two children will play together on the same harpsichord, and put upon it a handkerchief, without seeing the keys". It is possible that Nannerl was once in possession of this and another four-hand sonata, but both are now lost.

Since there is no other known clavier four-hand work dated to this time, this work, K. 19d, was generally accepted as authentic and put into the catalogue for Mozart's works. Recently the authenticity of the work has been disputed, with the general consensus of most scholars being that the work was, in fact, not written by Mozart. Since 1993, the Neue Mozart-Ausgabe has removed the piece for the authentic section of "Keyboard music" to "Works of Spurious or Doubtful Authenticity". Theories amongst scholars suggest that the work is one possibly by another of the Mozarts during their London tour, such as Leopold or even Nannerl. An interesting point toward the work's possible authenticity is the fact that the writings for both the right and left hand in the score occasionally collide with one another. This strongly suggests that the original work was composed specifically for the aforementioned two-manual harpsichord. However, it is likely that the Mozarts did not play four-hand sonatas at this time, but rather, they performed four-hand concertos for keyboard instead.

== Recordings ==
- 1976 – Ingrid Haebler (piano I), Ludwig Hoffmann (piano II) – Philips
- 1978 – Erik Smith (harpsichord I), Humphrey Burton (harpsichord II) – Decca
- 2001 – Ursula Dütschler (fortepiano I), Bart van Oort (fortepiano II) – Brilliant Classics
