= 20 Frith Street =

Building in Soho, Westminster, England

Coordinates: 51°30′51″N 0°07′55″W

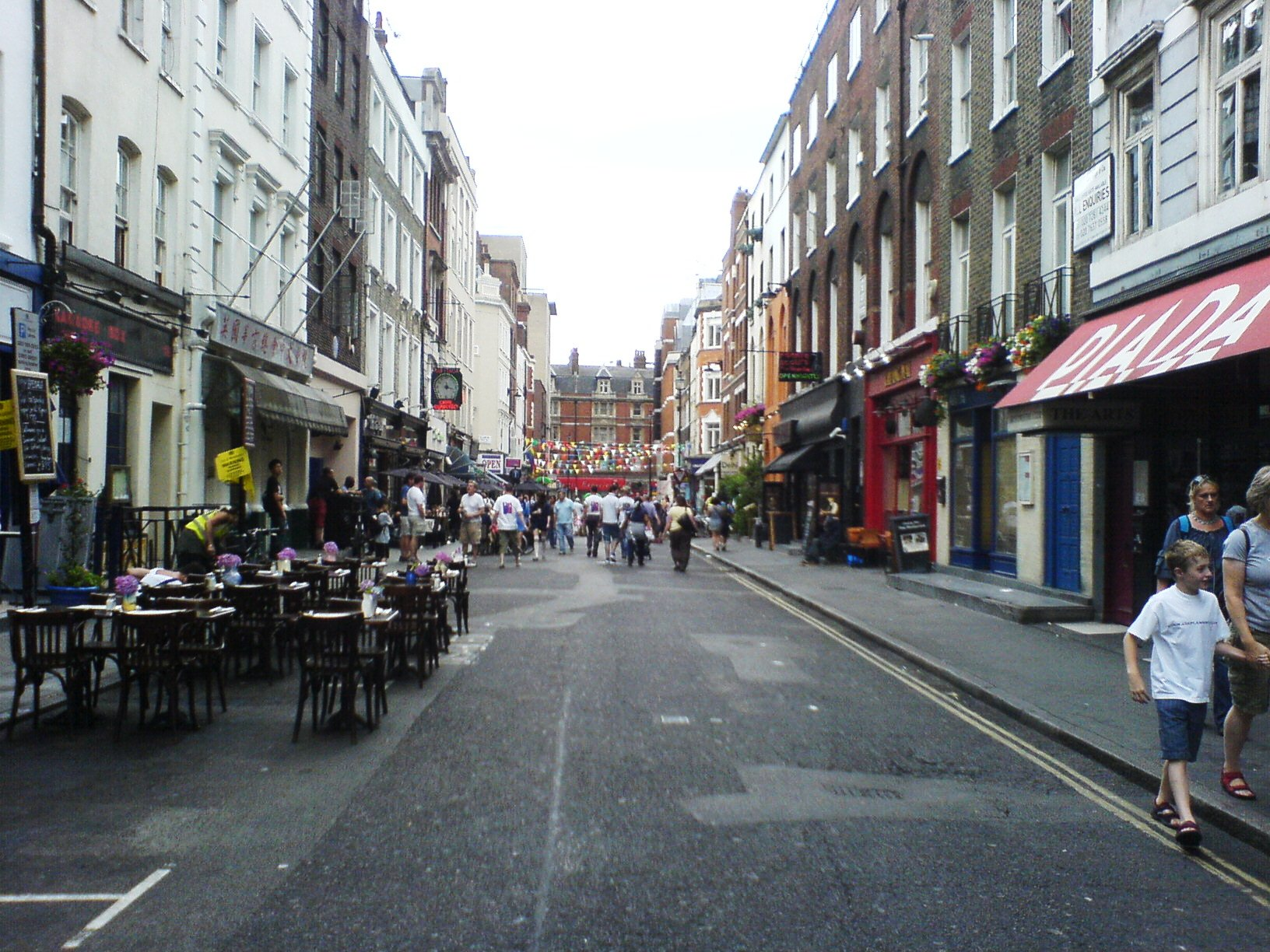
Frith Street, looking south over Old Compton Street. The brick-built No. 20 is third on the left, beyond the flagpoles on the UK Chinese Chamber of Commerce. The clock on the wall is at No. 22, Bar Italia.

20 Frith Street is a building in the Soho district of Westminster. It is located on the east side of Frith Street, close to the junction with Old Compton Street. The building which currently occupies the site of 20 Frith Street was built in 1858 by William Cooze to replace a house which dated from c1725, which itself may have replaced an even earlier building.

When the house was built in around 1725 there were fewer houses in the street (which for a period was named Thrift Street), because the north end was taken up by Monmouth House. At the time, the grounds of Monmouth House (now demolished) extended from the south side of Soho Square to Queen Street (now Bateman Street); and so during some of the eighteenth century the house's address was 15 Thrift Street. The most famous inhabitant at this address was Wolfgang Amadeus Mozart, who lived there aged eight from September 1764 during his grand tour of Europe with his father and his sister.

The site gained its current address of No. 20 Frith Street some time after 1773 when Monmouth House was pulled down, and more houses began to be built on its former grounds at the north end of the street. The eighteenth-century building at No. 20 was demolished and rebuilt in 1858, and since 1930 it has served as the stage door entrance for the Prince Edward Theatre situated on Old Compton Street. A blue plaque commemorates Mozart's stay.

== History ==
1725

The house which formerly occupied the present site of No. 20 was built in about 1725–6, when it was occupied by Lewis Aubert, a wine merchant.

Description

The 18th-century house was described in the 1966 Survey of London:

Quite apart from its association with Mozart, it is of interest as one of the best early eighteenth-century fronts known to have existed in the street. Built of brick, it was four storeys high and three windows wide, although the fourth storey may have been a later addition. The windows had segmental gauged arches and the jambs were probably dressed with red brick, while within the openings were slightly recessed boxframes. There was no bandcourse between the second and third storeys, but above the latter was a moulded brick cornice returned at either end. A shop front had been inserted in the ground storey in the early or mid nineteenth century.

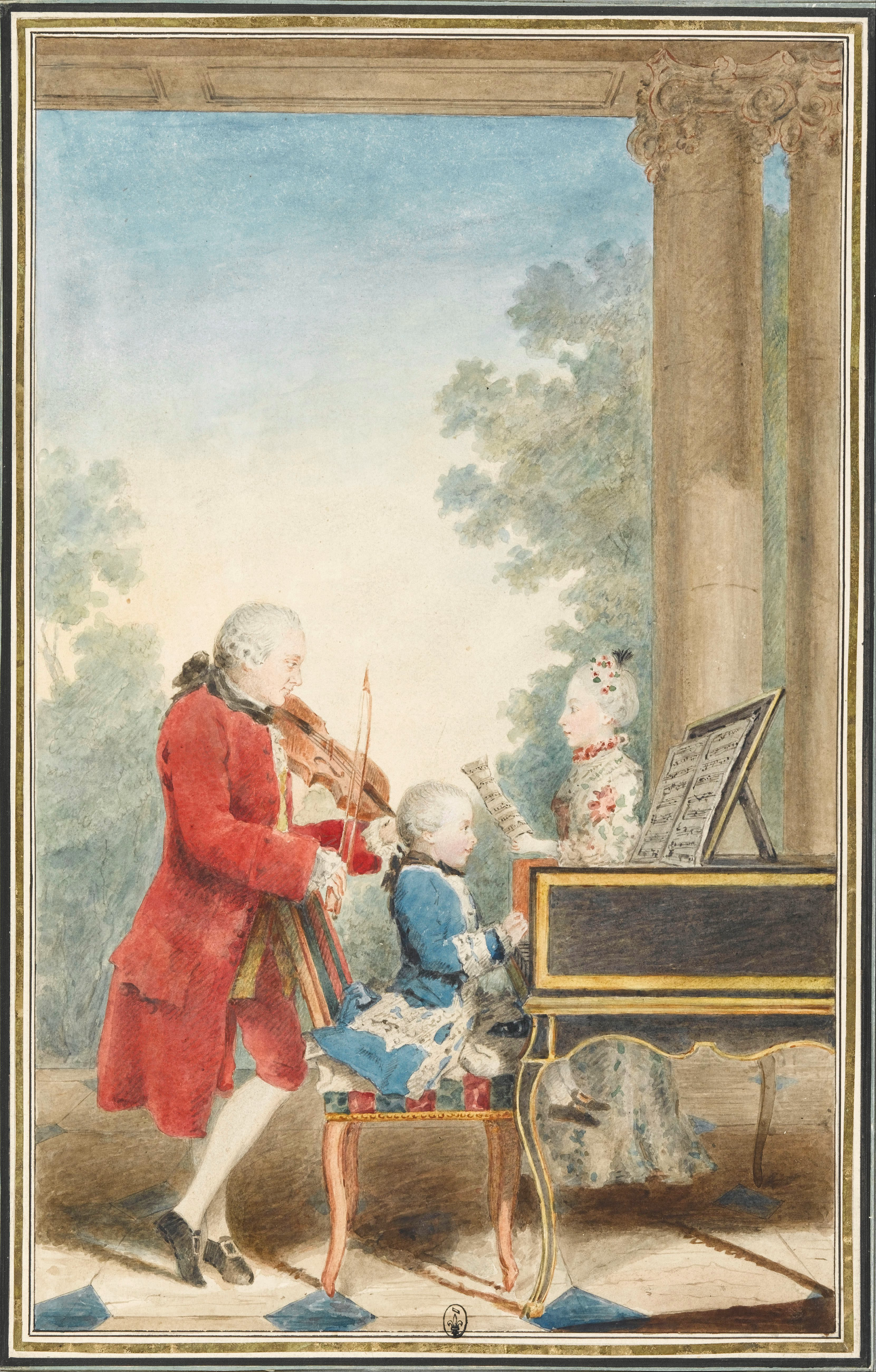
The Mozart family on tour: Leopold, Wolfgang, and Nannerl. Watercolor by Carmontelle, ca. 1763

The 1725 building was pulled down in 1858 and rebuilt with a similar brick façade, shown in a photograph from The Musical Standard, 3 Oct. 1908.

=== Mozart ===
The eight-year-old Wolfgang Amadeus Mozart stayed here with his father Leopold Mozart and his sister Nannerl in 1764–65, during a well-publicised European musical tour. The Mozarts were lodgers of Thomas Williamson, a maker of corsets or stays. During Mozart's stay, the address of the building was 15 Thrift Street. More houses were built after 1773 at the north end of the street (whose name reverted to Frith Street), resulting in the current address of 20 Frith Street. See below, §Numbering changes in Frith Street.

The Mozart family had removed from No. 180 Ebury Street, probably directly to No. 15 Thrift Street, on 25 September 1764. The young Mozart gave daily afternoon public recitals, and published his Opus 3 (Violin Sonatas, K. 10–15) from that address. His father had the music engraved, and sold the music at the lodgings. Mozart dedicated the set to Queen Charlotte, whose music teacher was Johann Christian Bach. Bach befriended the young Mozart, whose sonatas shows Bach's influence. It seems likely that he was a visitor to the house. It is possible that Mozart also wrote the Symphony No. 4 in D major, K. 19, here, (Note: The Viennese composer and writer Eduard Lannoy owned an 18th-century set of parts for this early work.) as well as the concert aria for tenor "Va, dal furor portata", K. 21/19c, and the short motet for chorus, God is our Refuge, K. 20. The London Sketchbook, K. 15, also dates from this period. The Mozart family was still in Frith Street on 30 May, leaving London in July.

=== Jean Baptiste Troye ===
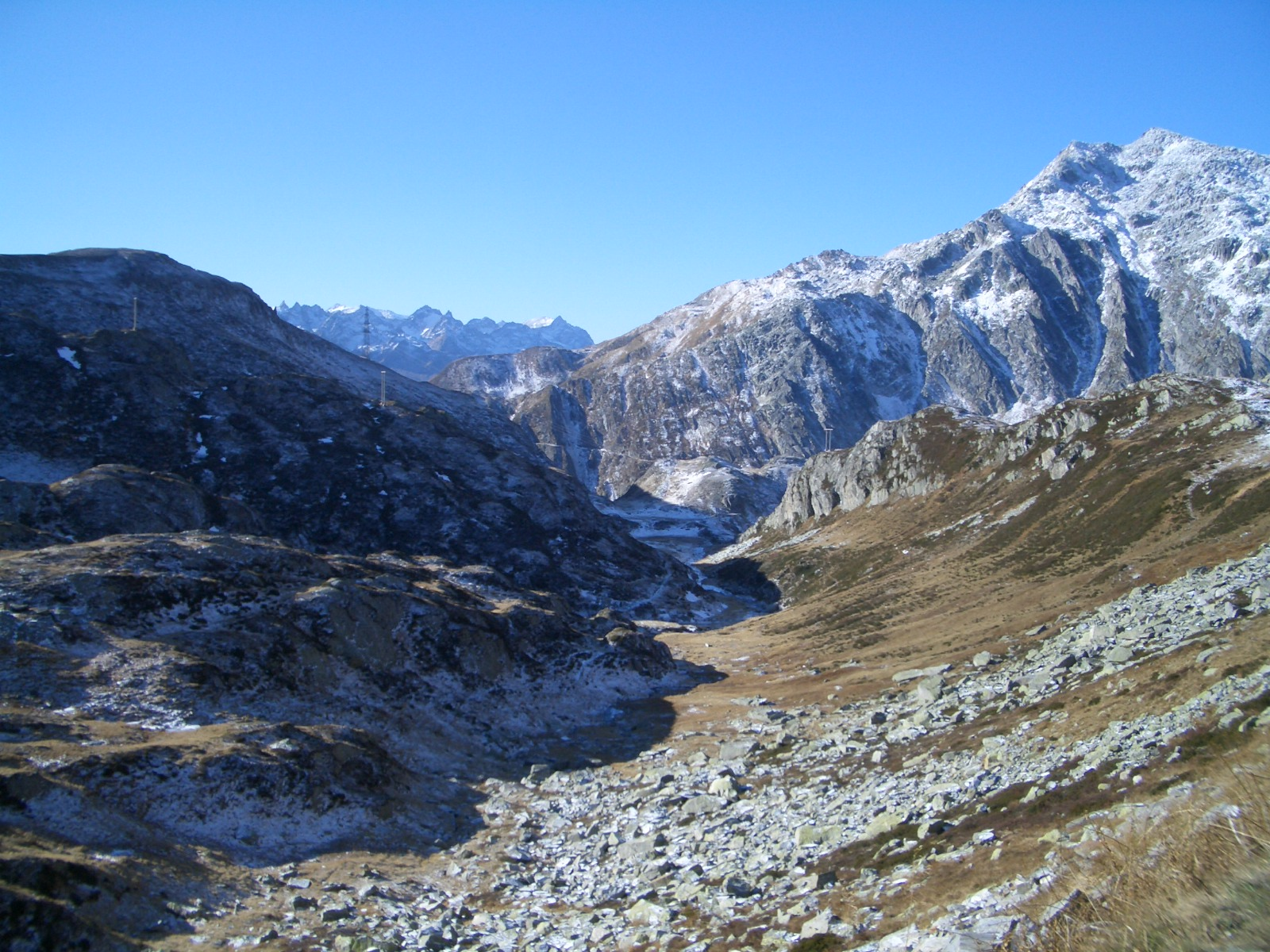
St. Gotthard landscape

The miniaturist Jean-Baptiste Troye exhibited dioramas (scale models of landscapes) at No. 20 in the early 1800s. His exhibitions consisted of "the most beautiful models and reliefs of countries, cities, mountains, &c. celebrated either for natural beauty or historical occurrences associated with them."

Troye was the pupil or (assistant) of the geologist and chemist Charles-François Exchaquet, who made the first accurate relief models (in wood) of the Mont Blanc chain, a part of Valais and the St. Gotthard group. A model of Mont Blanc which is (or was) in the possession of the Swiss Alpine Club may partly be Troye's work.

Exchacquet's models, like Troye's, were realistically painted with glaciers made of spath (i.e. spar) and the models were about 1.40m x 40 cm (about 4' 6" by 1' 6"). One of Exchaquet's models still existed in 1920, having been presented to the museum of Görlitz by Baron de Gersdorf. (Baron von Gersdorff from Saxony, possibly?). Gersdorf authenticated the first ascent of Mont Blanc by Jacques Balmat and physician Michel-Gabriel Paccard in 1786. Exchaquet was also the director of mines and foundries at Servoz in Haut-Faucigny, where attempts were made to emulate the success of the English steel-makers who, however, were using the very best imported Swedish Oregrounds iron.

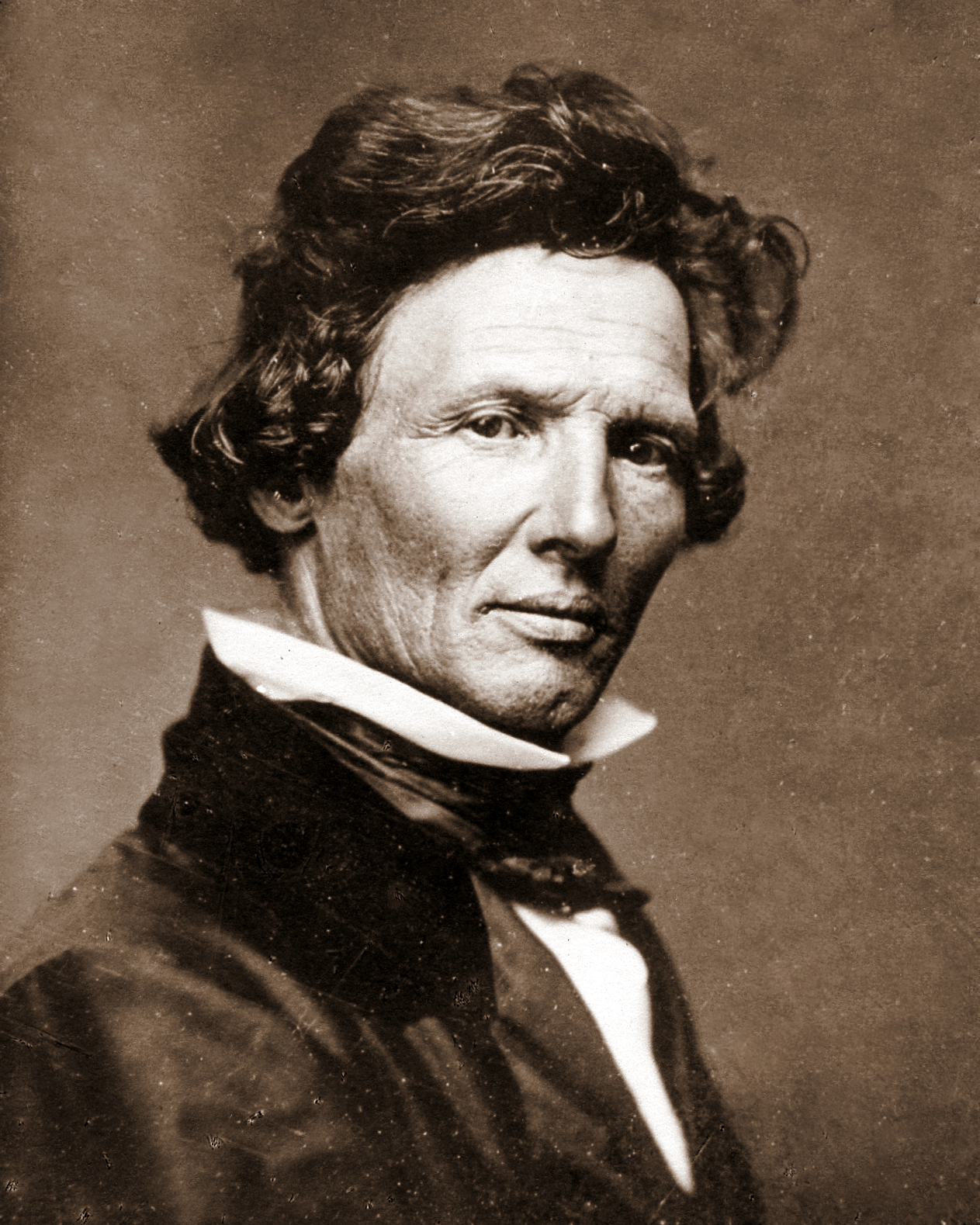
Edward Troye, J. B. Troye's son

In 1816 Troye co-authored with one S. Glover A Description of the Inundation of the Valley of Bagnes in Swisserland. [sic] (Note: In 1818 a huge landslide occurred in the Vals de Bagnes in the Swiss Alps, travelling several miles into the upper Rhone valley. Picture of Lac de Mauvoisin, 1818 – the lake dammed by an ice fall of the Gietroz Glacier which caused the disaster. The event was described by Hans Conrad Escher: "... in half an hour the lake was completely emptied, and the five hundred and thirty millions of cubic feet of water which it contained, thundering down into the valley with a rapidity and violence of which no idea can be formed ... Enormous heaps of pebbles and rocks, which the floods had carried off higher up, were deposited in the plains ... runs through the town of Martigny ... covers the whole plain with thick mud ... According to the unanimous testimony-of the inhabitants, the flood took up half an hour in passing every point which it reached; thus, in the short space of thirty minutes, the whole mass of the water of the lake, drawing with it all the debris, and forming a column of more than 530 millions of cubic feet, passed every part of the valley. Source: Escher 1819, pp. 87–95, cited in: Montgomery, Keith. "Neuchatel, Switzerland 1819" The development of the glacial theory 1800–1870: Episodes 1800 – 1840 University of Wisconsin – Marathon County. Retrieved: 5 January 2013) (Note: Troye was not the only inhabitant of No. 20 with an interest in floods. Joseph Menchen had a business in New York selling electrical scenic stage shows for amusement parks such as Luna Park in Coney Island and the 1904 St Louis World's Fair. One of these was a diorama representing the Johnstown Flood, with moving water and fire effects. See The Billboard, 2 November 1907 and The Billboard, 2 March 1907) Troye published an account of Mont Blanc and his models in 1819. There is a picture of either Troye's or Exchaquet's highly detailed work in Seylaz 1935, p. 193.

There is a fine plaster medallion of William Thomas Brande, attributed to J. B. Troye c1820, in the National Portrait Gallery.

Jean Baptiste Troye's son was the artist Edward Troye, America's foremost 19th-century horse painter, whose influences were George Stubbs and John Sartorius. Born in Lausanne in 1808, he studied art in England for a number of years before moving to the United States.

1820

A bookseller, Thomas King junior, lived at No. 20 from 1820 to 1822

John Green, aged 16, was found guilty in October 1820, of stealing 15 lbs. of lead, value 8s., the goods of Thomas Matthews Redaway, and fixed to a certain dwelling-house of his. No. 20, Frith-street, Soho. He was transported for seven years. A certain felon named John Green was transported to Australia on board the Morley and arrived in Newcastle, New South Wales on the Elizabeth Henrietta on 14 March 1821.

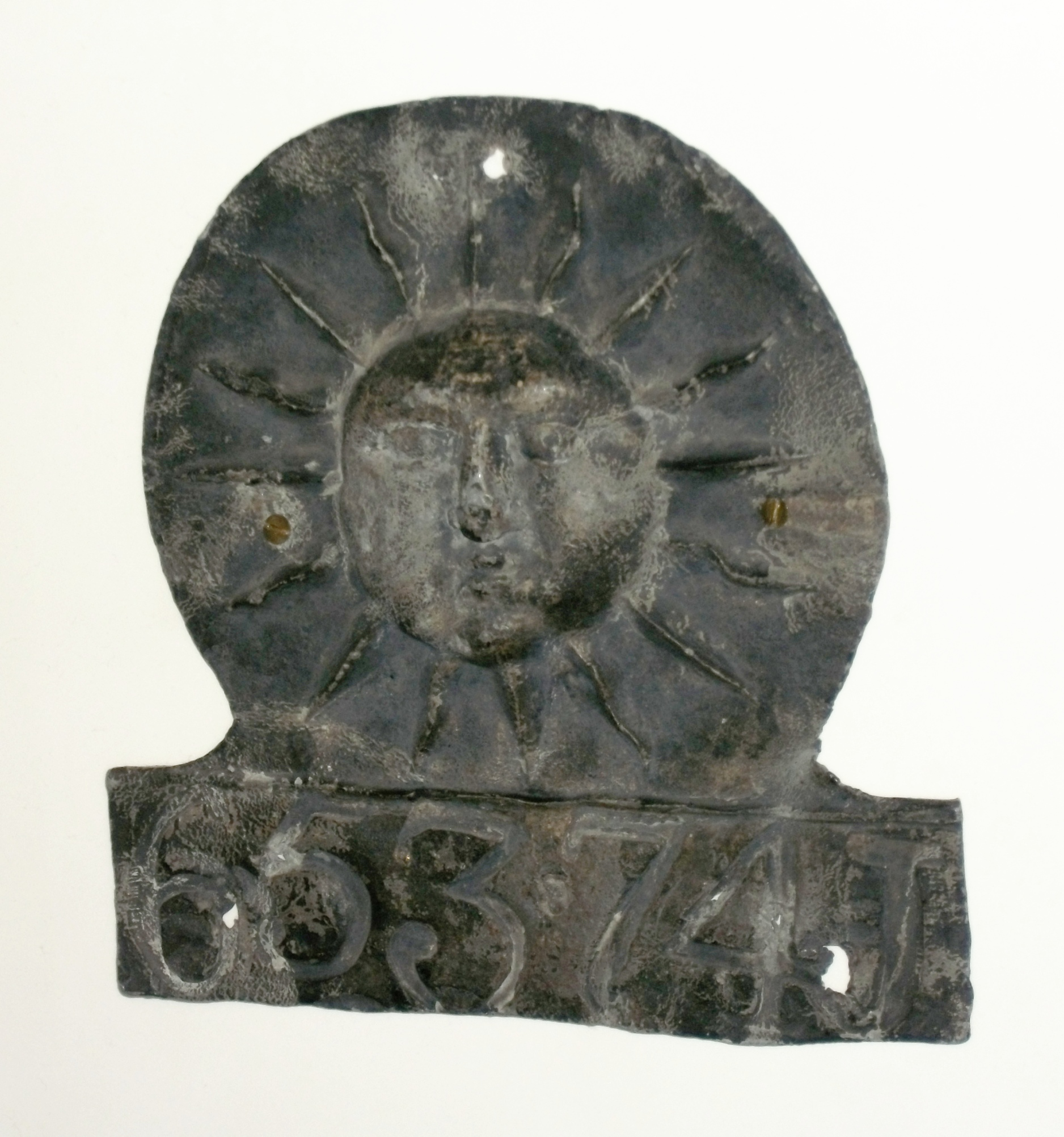
Plaque of the Sun Fire Office (established 1710), the first organization to use these devices

1827–1839

Frederick Rothenburg, late of No, 20, Frith-Street appeared on 13 July 1827 at the Court for Relief of Insolvent Debtors, Portugal Street, Lincoln's Inn Fields, as did Augustus Armand, formerly of No. 20, Frith-Street, assistant to a Jeweller, on 13 November. In 1828 John Pike and James Clark upholders and furniture warehousemen were insured by the Sun Fire Office (now RSA Insurance Group) as was William Landon, gent., in 1830. A fire started "at 9½ p.m." on 18 September 1839 next door at No. 19, a bookbinder's. The back workshops were burned out and three adjoining buildings were damaged.

=== William Cooze ===
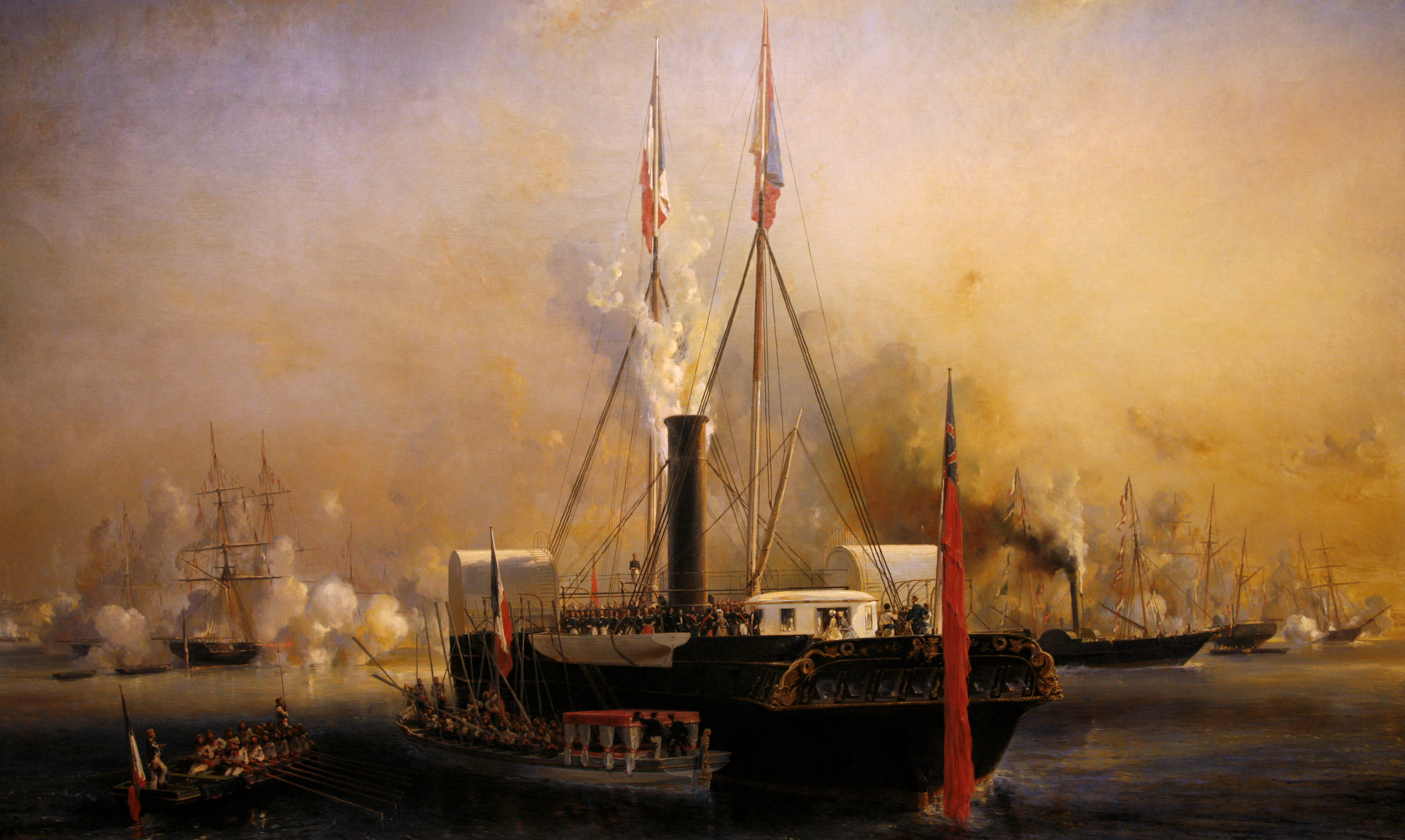
HMY Victoria and Albert at Le Tréport in 1843, by Eugène Isabey. Queen Victoria (whose bonnet is the whitest thing in the picture) is just to the right of the funnel. Best viewed at maximum magnification.

William Whitley Cooze (c1794 – 1866), a house decorator, plumber and glazier had his business at No. 20. A business partnership with William H. Penley was dissolved in 1841. In 1844 he was selling "Improved Marble papers" (i.e. wallpaper), and calling himself 'Marine Decorator to her Majesty'. The first royal yacht to be powered by steam, HMY Victoria and Albert, was launched the previous year.

In 1847 John Penny, aged 30, was indicted for stealing 12 feet of lead-pipe, value 10s.; the property of "William Witley Coorze", his master for four years; and Richard Garrett, aged 27, for feloniously receiving the same, knowing it to have been stolen. Penny was sentenced to three months after a plea for leniency, and Garrett received a year in prison. John Green (see above) got seven years in Australia for a similar crime in 1820. In 1851 Cooze was employing 15 men in his house-decorating business. The original house at 20 Frith Street (dating from around 1725) was demolished and rebuilt in 1858. Cooze was declared bankrupt on 16 April 1866 and died shortly afterward.

=== Soho Club for Working Girls ===
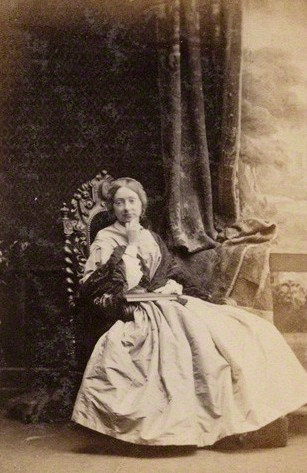
Maude Stanley on 19 March 1861, by Camille Silvy

The Soho Club for Working Girls met at the rear of 20 Frith Street between 1880 and 1884. The club was established by the Hon. Maude Stanley in order to improve the lives of young women workers in London and provincial towns. The Soho Club began in a very humble way in three small rooms at No. 5 Porter Street, Newport Market. (Note: Newport Market was the area between Charing Cross Road and West Street. By the mid-nineteenth century Newport Market had become a haunt of thieves and prostitutes, and a number of wealthy philanthropists including W. E. Gladstone and Sir Henry Hoare established the Newport Market Refuge 'for the object of affording nightly shelter and sustenance to the really destitute and houseless with the special view of making enquiries into their characters and of providing for the ultimate benefit of such as shall seem worthy of assistance'. Porter Street, with the rest of Newport Market, was gradually bought up by the Metropolitan Board of Works and swept away in 1882 to make Shaftesbury Avenue and Charing Cross Road.) There were forty-four members, and an average attendance of fourteen every evening. The premises, after a few months, proved too small, and a workshop at the back of 20 Frith Street was secured, at a rental of £50 a year. This building served until 1884, when Miss Stanley purchased, aided by her many benevolent friends, the "commodious and beautiful building" at 59 Greek Street at a cost, for the freehold, building and furnishing, of £7,200. The club eventually grew into London Youth (Federation of London Youth Clubs).

1885–1911

Wells & Co., wholesale tea dealers, had their offices at No. 20 in 1895. (Note: "Part 4: Trades & Professional Directory". Post Office London Directory. 1895. p. 2182 (pdf 639). NB Almost all the other wholesale tea dealers listed in this P.O. Directory had offices in the City of London in the EC (East Central) postal district. Wells & Co. were almost unique in the list in having premises in Soho, W. London, quite some distance from the financial and business district.)

According to one source No. 20 was also occupied in 1895 by Messrs. Osborne, Garratt, & Co., who sold razors and hair-curling tongs. The company's usual address seems to have been at 51 Frith Street, however.

Lewis Jacobs was occupying No. 20 in 1910.

=== Joseph Menchen ===
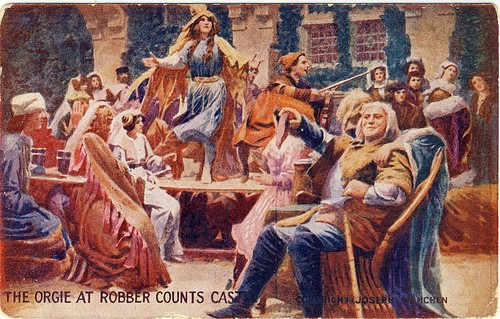
Souvenir postcard of Joseph Menchen's 1912 colour film of The Miracle

Joseph Menchen, an American inventor and theatrical lighting designer with his own profitable electrical equipment business, arrived in London in late 1911 or early 1912. Menchen was one of the first film projectionists, having shown films at Tony Pastor's New York vaudeville theatre from 1896 to 1899 with an Acres kineopticon. It seems possible that Menchen was connected with a business whose address was at 20 Frith Street from 1912, the National Bioscope Electric Theatre. On a previous visit to Europe in 1908 he had opened a London branch of his Joseph Menchen's Electrical Company at 341 Walworth Road, which was also the address of an Electric Theatre cinema owned by Joseph Jay Bamberger, previously a New York stockbroker. The building in Frith Street continued as a nameless 'cinematograph theatre' in 1914, managed by Antonio Agosti.

Menchen was also involved in negotiations to produce a film of The Miracle, a spectacular stage production by Max Reinhardt of Karl Vollmöller's play which ran for three months from December 1911 at Olympia. Menchen shot his film on location in Austria in October 1912, and The Miracle received its première at the Royal Opera House in Covent Garden in December 1912. The film, which was his own personal project, was as much of a success as the stage production, running to full houses all over the UK until Easter 1913.

From March 1914, 20 Frith Street was the registered address of the Menchen Film Company Ltd. He formed the firm at the same time as he was preparing to sell his lease on his main film business (the Studios Menchen in the Paris suburb of Épinay-sur-Seine) where he had half-finished one or more films based on the Arsene Lupin detective novels by Maurice Leblanc.

He was planning to stay in France, but as the invading German army neared Paris at the start of the First World War Menchen fled in his automobile with many cans of film and was evacuated to England on board the USS Tennessee. During the war Menchen, probably quite annoyed with the Germans, designed an experimental flame-thrower tank for the British Army, and 20 Frith Street appears as his address on a patent application for a more portable device.

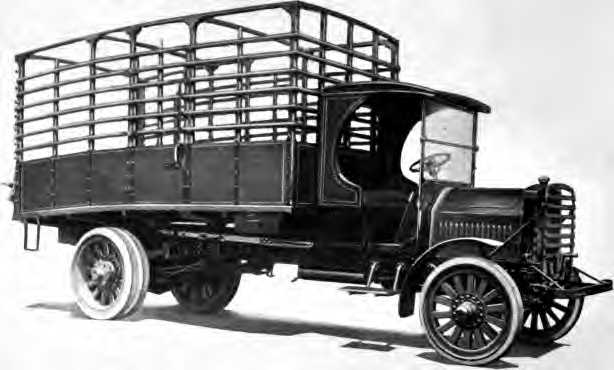
Schacht 3½ ton truck, c. 1918

There were two businesses at 20 Frith Street in 1915: the Cinema Auction Mart and Exchange (agents for theatre property), and the American Export Co. The latter firm imported Schacht 40 h.p. trucks from the US which were sold under the "Patricia" name. Gustav A. Schacht, the vice-president of the G.A. Schacht Motor Truck Company, was Menchen's brother-in-law. (Note: Menchen's wife, Madge (from Cincinnati, Ohio,) was the sister of Minnie Bickler, who married Gustav Schacht in 1894. The Schacht Manufacturing Co., Cincinnati, originally made horse buggies, started building automobiles from 1904 and switched to producing trucks from 1913, later producing fire engines.) In a similar enterprise Frank J. Godsol (or Goldsoll), an associate of Menchen's from the film world, was importing Pierce-Arrow trucks into France for the French Ministry of Munitions in 1915: Godsoll was falsely accused of profiteering by the US government in 1916 and briefly imprisoned in the US from March to July 1916. Godsol was chairman of Goldwyn Pictures (later MGM) from 1919 to 1922. In 1922, Godsol became president of Goldwyn Pictures. In 1924, Godsol initiated the merger of the companies that became Metro-Goldwyn-Mayer.

Menchen returned to the US in February 1917 (one reason why his firm failed to make any returns from 1916 on), and the Menchen Film Co. was wound up by notice in the London Gazette 10 Jan 1920.

1917

The Samson Film Company had its offices at No. 20 in 1917.

=== Prince Edward Theatre ===
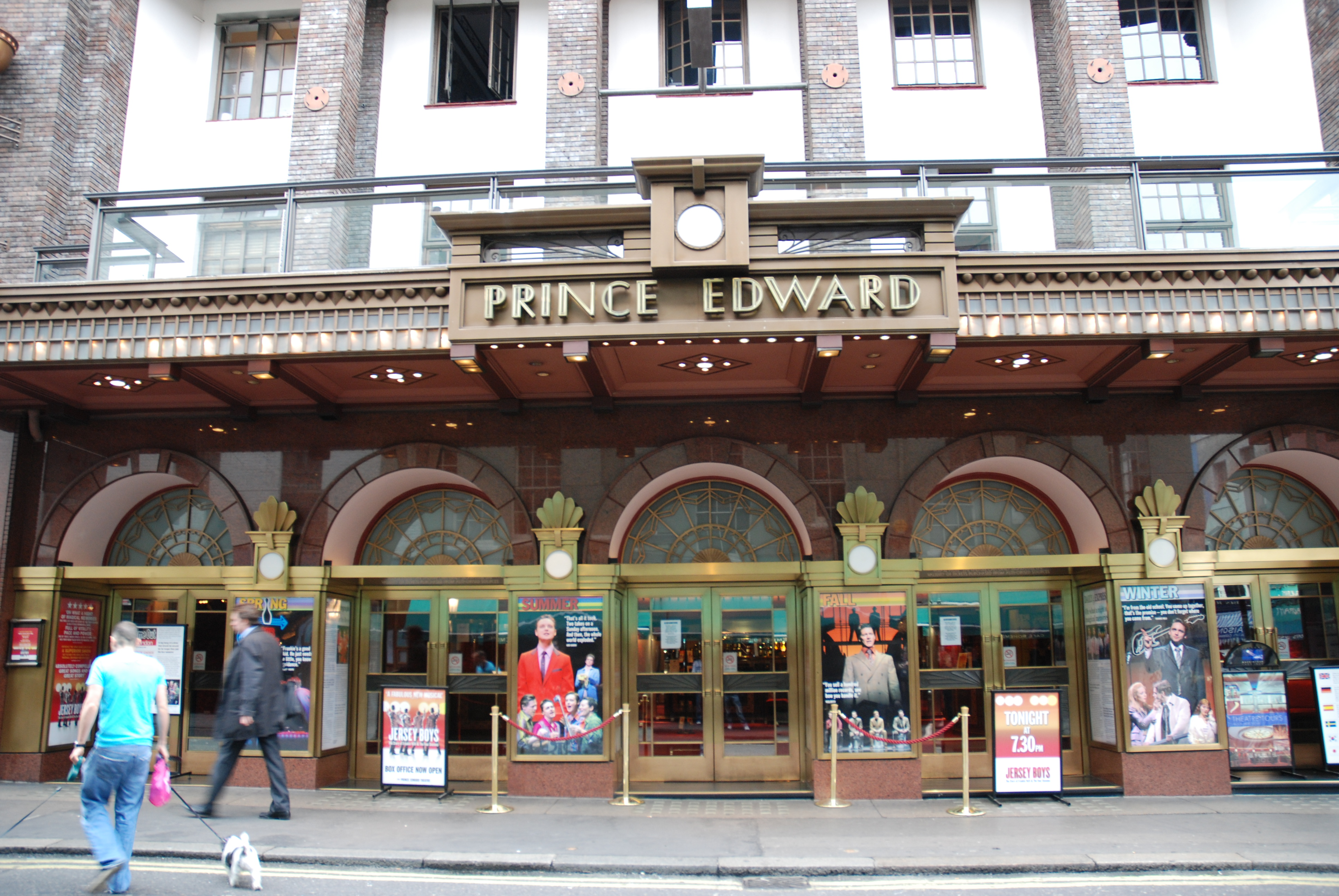
Main entrance of the Prince Edward Theatre on Old Compton Street

The rear of the building is close to the back of the Prince Edward Theatre on Old Crompton Street. After the theatre's construction in 1930 the Frith Street address served as the theatre's spacious dressing room wing and its rear stage door, which function it still fulfils in 2012. (Note: The Prince Edward Theatre was originally intended to be named the Ziegfeld Theatre and would have been the London showcase for Florenz Ziegfeld, Jr.'s Broadway stage productions. But while the theatre was under construction, Ziegfeld fell out with the owners and the deal was cancelled. The planned production of Rio Rita (which had been the première attraction at the Ziegfeld Theatre, New York when it opened in 1927) nevertheless opened on schedule, but under the theatre’s new name of Prince Edward. Prince Edward Theatre at cinematreasures.org)

== Numbering changes in Frith Street ==
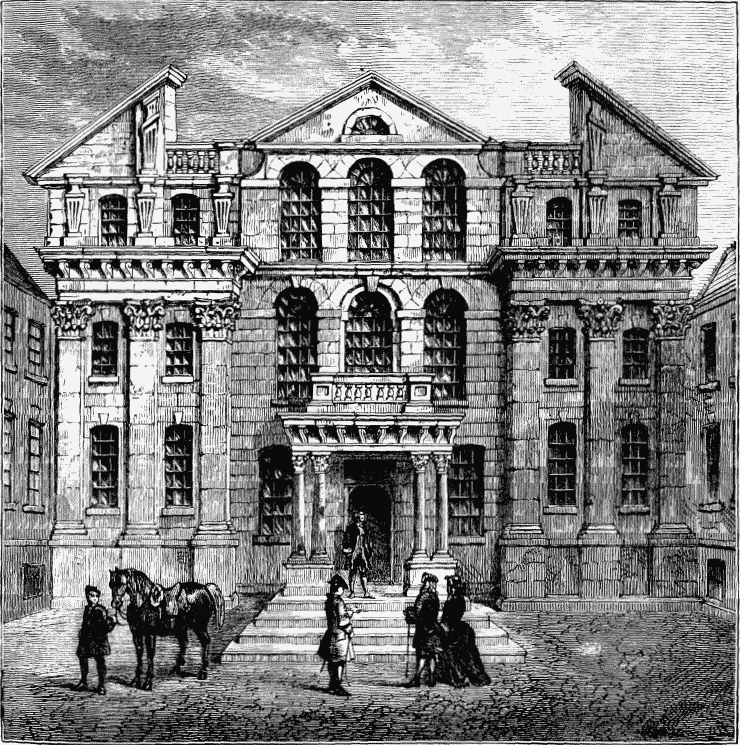
Monmouth House, Soho Square

The numbering in Frith Street seems to have altered more than once, but the change of address from No. 15 to No. 20 appears to be chiefly due to the building of more houses on the site of Monmouth House after it was demolished in 1773. Historical sources mentioning '20 Frith Street' around or before this date may refer to the premises of the current No. 25. (Note: These probably include: By 1759 No. 20 (now number 25) was occupied by Heinrich Luther (b. c1718 in Hesse-Kassel, Germany, d. Frith St. 1781) and his wife Frances Desborough (or Disbrowe) (b. c1730, d. Frith St. c1785). Their four children were born in no. 20, the two youngest died in infancy. See Desborough Genealogy. Frances' x5 great-uncle was John Desborough (see John Disbrowe (1608–80). BCW Project Retrieved 20 December 2020), who married Oliver Cromwell's sister Jane, and was part of the Rule of the Major-Generals during the Protectorate. BCW Project. Accessed 14 January 2016. John Disbrowe was major in Sir Thomas Fairfax's Regiment of Horse in 1646. See The New Model Army December 1646. US Combined Arms Center, CA Research Library, Nafziger collection. Accessed 14 January 2016.; John Francis Rigaud, an Associate of the Royal Academy, had an address at Mr. Luther's, Frith Street, in 1772 (Rimbault 1895, p. 106).; The historical painter Vincent Waldré, (Vincenzo Valdrè, born Faenza 1740, d. Dublin 1814) sent a painting from No. 20 in 1774 entitled "Jupiter and Thetis," to an exhibition of the Free Society of Artists. Source: Strickland, Walter G. (1913). "Vincent Waldré, Historical Painter". A Dictionary of Irish Artists. (online edition hosted at LibraryIreland). Dublin & London: Maunsel & Company. Various premises in Soho were used as forwarding addresses by artists.)

Monmouth House was originally planned by the rebellious Duke of Monmouth in 1681–2, but lengthy delays meant that it was not completely finished (to designs by Robert Archer) until March 1719. The original grounds occupied the block between Soho Square and Queen Street (now Bateman Street), and the final plans for finishing Monmouth House allocated space for five new houses on the east side of Frith Street starting in the middle of the block, to replace the old stables. These new properties (the current Nos. 6–10) were numbered 1–5. The first two of these, Nos. 1 & 2, (currently 6 & 7) were completed in 1718 and the numbering continued on the south side of Queen Street (now Bateman Street) with 6 (presently No. 11).

It was during this period when Mozart stayed in No. 15 that the street was temporarily called Thrift Street, a possible corruption of the name of Robert Frith who laid out Soho Square in 1681. Some sources say that the street's original name was indeed Thrift Street.

After Monmouth House was pulled down in 1773, five more houses were built right at the north (Soho Square) end of the street. This ultimately resulted in Nos. 1–5 Frith Street being renumbered 6–10, and No. 15 becoming No. 20. The Hospital for Women at 30 Soho Square (at the junction of Frith Street) gradually acquired the first four houses in Frith Street in 1852, 1882 and two in 1909, with the result that No. 5 is the first 'proper' address in Frith Street.
