= The Royal Yacht Passing St Michael's Mount =

Painting by Clarkson Stanfield

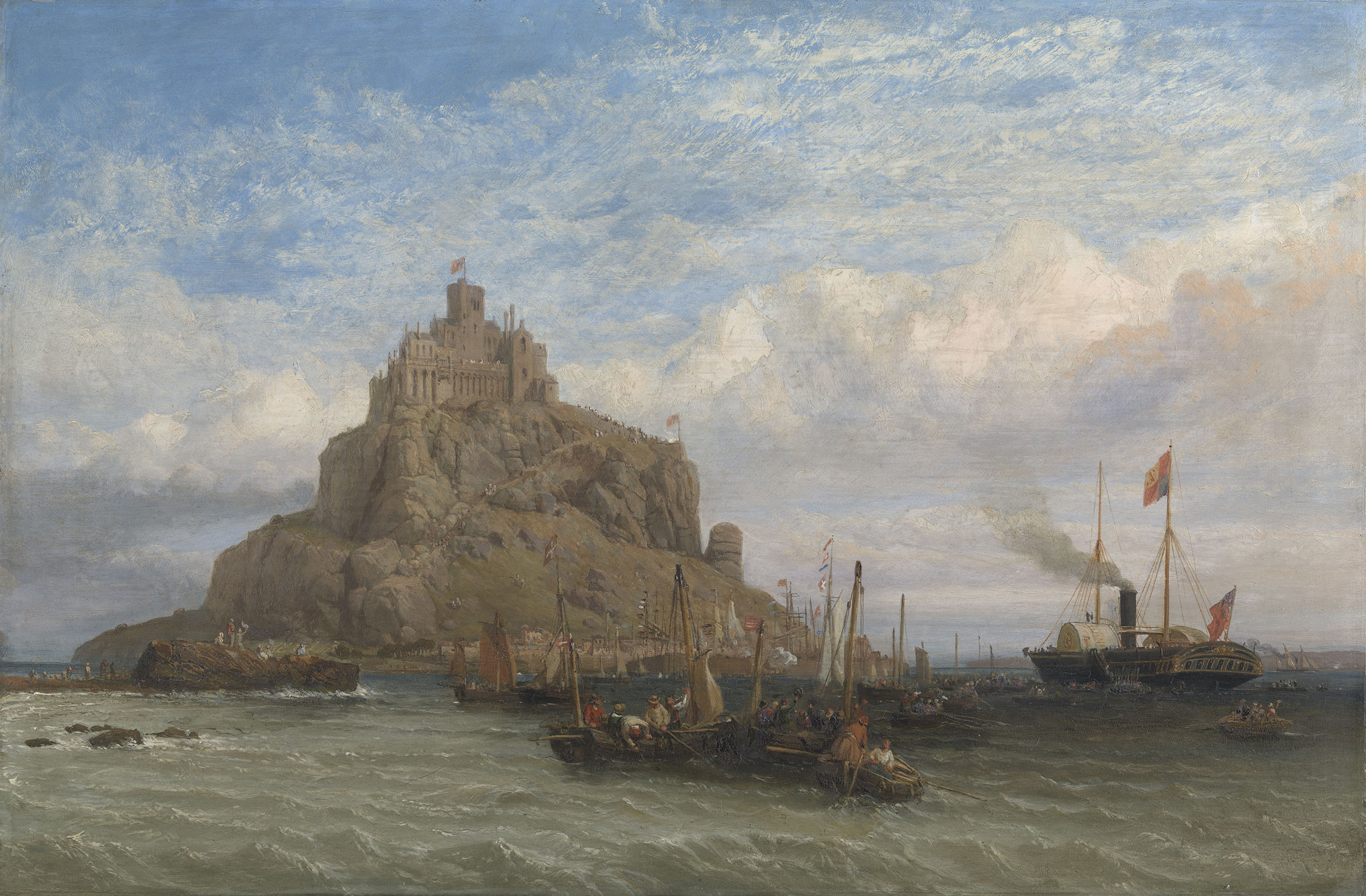
- Artist: Clarkson Stanfield
- Year: 1846
- Medium: Oil on panel, Landscape painting
- Dimensions: 30.1 cm × 45.8 cm (11.9 in × 18.0 in)
- Location: Royal Collection

The Royal Yacht Passing St Michael's Mount is an 1846 landscape painting by the British artist Clarkson Stanfield. It features a view of Saint Michael's Mount on the coast of Cornwall, and records the steam-powered Royal Yacht Victoria and Albert which anchored in Mount's Bay on 6 September 1846 with Queen Victoria, Prince Albert and other members of the royal family aboard.

Stanfield was a former sailor who was known for his Romantic seascapes and produced a larger, more turbulent depiction of the view for his 1830 breakthrough work Mount St Michael, Cornwall. The work was commissioned by Victoria who gave it as a Christmas Present to Albert. It was recorded as hanging in the Prince's Consort's apartments at Windsor Castle in 1878 and remains in the Royal Collection. In 1855 a engraving based on the painting was produced by Robert Wallis for the The Art Journal.

== Bibliography ==
- Marsden, Jonathan. Victoria & Albert: Art & Love. Royal Collection, 2010.
- Van der Merwe, Pieter & Took, Roger. The Spectacular career of Clarkson Stanfield. Tyne and Wear County Council Museums, 1979.
