= Christmas Gift =

A Christmas gift is a gift given in celebration of Christmas. They are often exchanged on December 25.

Christmas Gift may also refer to:

- Christmas gift (exclamation), an exclamation traced back as early as 1809 in the southern United States

== Film and television ==
- A Christmas Gift, a 1980 Claymation short film by Will Vinton
- The Christmas Gift, a 1986 American drama television film starring John Denver
- The Christmas Gift, a 2015 American drama television film directed by Fred Olen Ray
- The Christmas Gift, a 2018 short film written and directed by Bogdan Mureșanu; the basis for his 2024 feature directorial debut The New Year That Never Came

=== Television episodes ===
- "A Christmas Gift", Ghosts (2019) series 5, episode 7 (2023)
- "A Christmas Gift", The Middle season 3, episode 11 (2011)
- "Christmas Gift", On the Wings of Love episode 98 (2015)
- "The Christmas Gift", Saved by the Bell: The New Class season 3, episode 25 (1995)
- "The Christmas Gift", Touched by an Angel season 6, episode 10 (1999)

== Literature ==
- The Christmas Gift, a 1862 juvenile novel by Oliver Optic; the third entry in the Riverdale Books series
- Christmas Gift, a 1960 book by Frances Parkinson Keyes
- A Christmas Gift, first published as The Melodeon, a 1977 novel by Glendon Swarthout
- Christmas Gift! a 1989 book by Ferrol Sams
- The Christmas Gift (Spanish: El regalo de Navidad), a 2000 picture book by Francisco Jiménez
- The Christmas Gift: The Story of the Nativity, a 2002 picture book by Elizabeth Laird
- Christmas Gift: A Family, a 2005 novel by Barbara Hannay
- The Christmas Gift, a 2013 eBook novella by Monica McInerney

== Music ==
- Christmas Gift (album), the album by Kokia
- A Christmas Gift, EP by Kylie Minogue, with tracks from Aphrodite

== See also ==
- Christmas Present (disambiguation)
- Gift (disambiguation)
