= Monmouth House =

Coordinates: 51.5147°N 0.1318°W

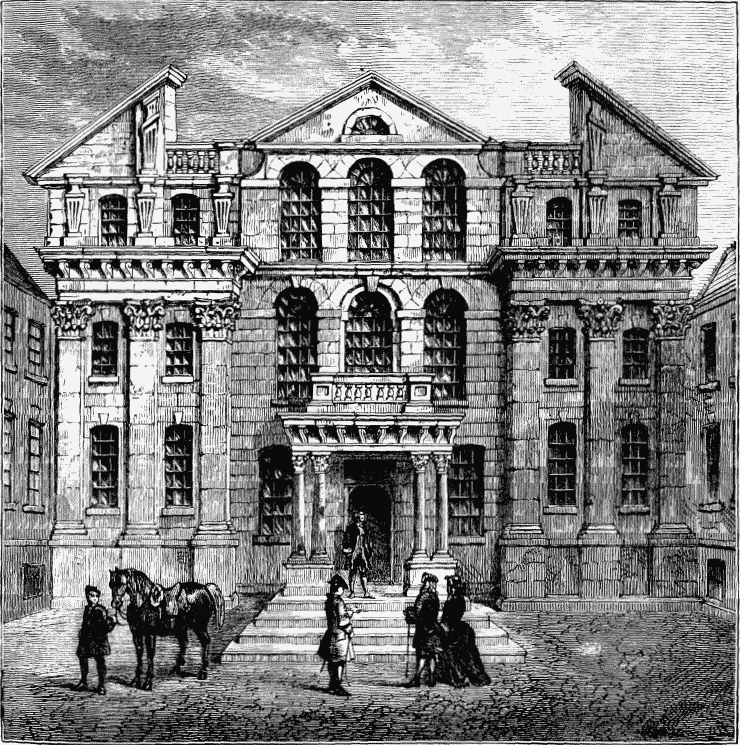
Engraving of Monmouth House, Soho Square

Monmouth House was a 17th-century mansion in Soho Square (then called King’s Square) built for the Duke of Monmouth, the oldest illegitimate son of King Charles II. After the Duke's execution for attempting to lead the Monmouth Rebellion against the unpopular Catholic successor to Charles, James II, the house was owned by the Bateman family and loaned to various important people including the French ambassador before being demolished in 1773.

== History ==
In 1681, the Duke of Monmouth leased a large site on the South side of the square from Richard Frith and his partner Cadogan Thomas of Lambeth (a timber merchant), in association with Benjamin Hinton (citizen and goldsmith), and William Nutt of London (a merchant).

Monmouth House occupied the south side of what was then called King’s Square. It was designed by Sir Christopher Wren and built in 1677 by a Mr Ford. Today, there is an alley running through the site connecting Soho Square to Bateman Street, called Bateman's Buildings after Viscount Bateman, who owned Monmouth House in the mid-18th Century before it was demolished. The house was redesigned by architect Thomas Archer for Lord Bateman's father, Sir James Bateman, Lord Mayor of London. Archer also used the architectural design of a broken pediment on the façade in Chettle House, Dorset, whose roof was demolished in 1773, and in Roehampton House, where the damaged pediment was removed after 1780.

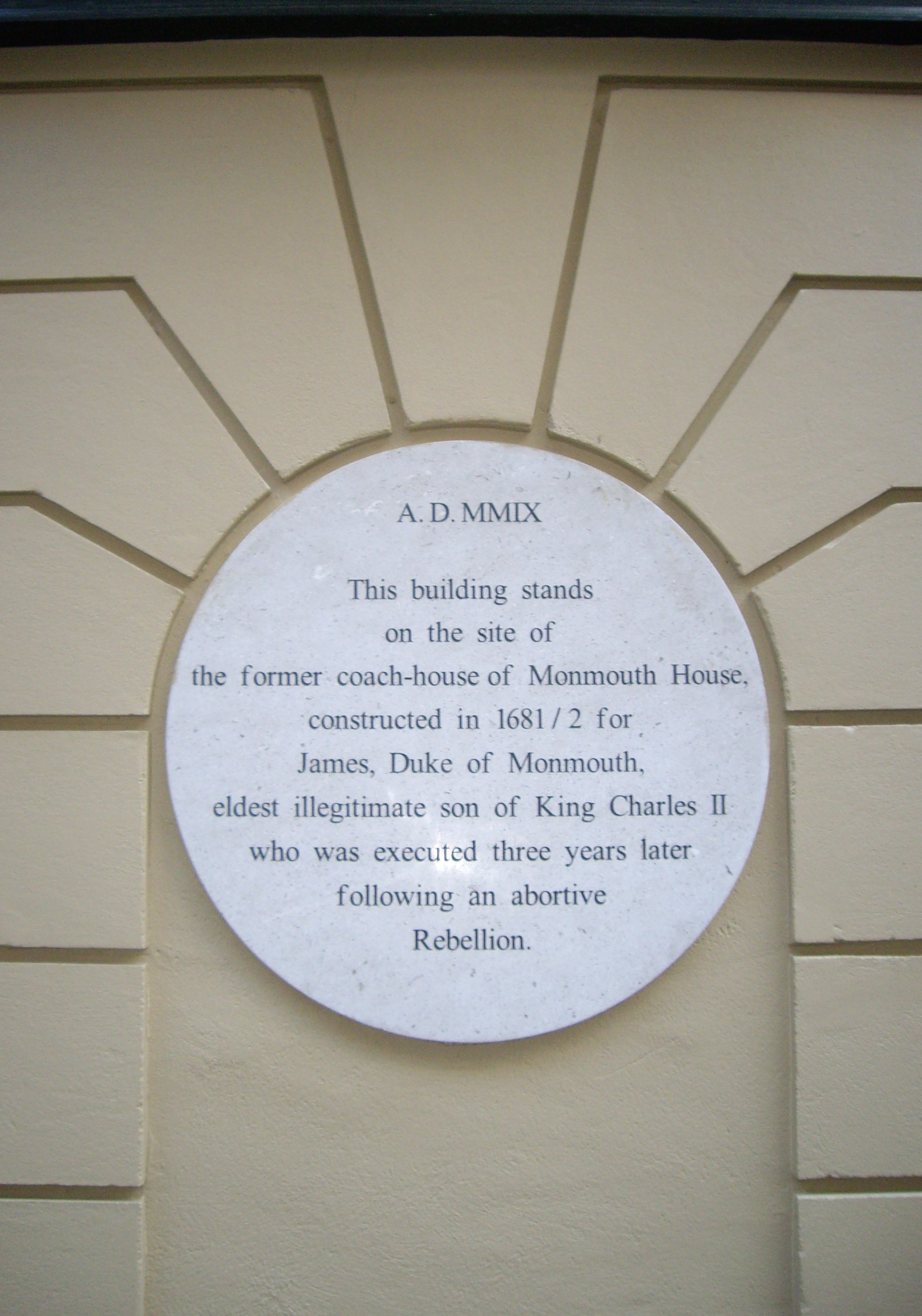
Plaque noting where Monmouth House stood in Soho Square, London

It is not entirely clear why the Bateman family decided to demolish the house, but at the end of the 18th century the area seems to have fallen out of fashion: "as the stream of fashion was setting westwards, they [the Bateman family] travelled along with it, and, pulling down the mansion, let out the site on building leases." The house was pulled down in 1773, which freed up space for more houses in Frith Street, which runs south out of Soho Square. See also Numbering changes in Frith Street.
