= HMY Osborne =

HMY Osborne is the name of two British Royal Yachts:

- HMY Victoria and Albert (1843), renamed HMY Osborne in 1855
- HMY Osborne (1868)
