= Vincenzo Valdrè =

Italian painter (1740–1814)

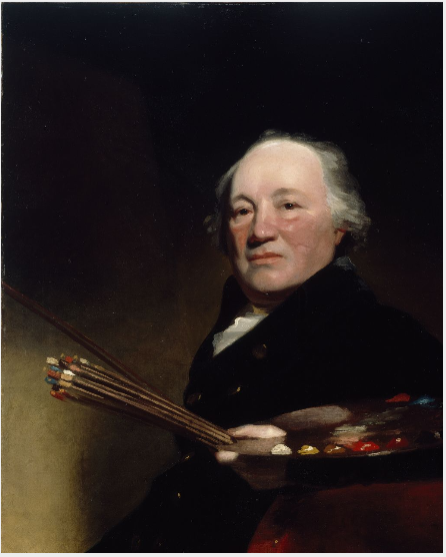
Portrait of Vincent Waldré by William Cuming

Vincenzo Valdrè (1740–1814), also known as Vincent Waldré, was an Italian artist and architect who was born in Faenza and brought up in Parma, but who practiced in a Neoclassical-style in England and Ireland.

Sometimes referred to as il Faenza or "Il Faentino", he studied in the Academy of Fine Arts in Parma under Giuseppe Baldrighi and in 1764 won an award at the Academy for his drawing of Agar in the Desert consoled by the Angel. In 1768 he went to complete his studies in the French Academy in Rome.

While in Rome he taught the architects James Lewis (1751–1820) and Richard Norris (1750–1794). In 1774 he exhibited a painting entitled "Jupiter and Thetis" at the Free Society of Artists in London, giving as his address 20 Frith Street, Soho. At around this time he was recruited by George Nugent-Temple-Grenville, 1st Marquess of Buckingham to work on Stowe House in Buckinghamshire, England. He moved with his patron to Ireland, perhaps in 1787, when the latter became, for the second time, the Lord Lieutenant. He painted the ceilings in St Patrick's Hall in the Dublin Castle with frescoes depicting Irish history, including St Patrick lighting the Paschal fire on the Hill of Slane. He died in Dublin, reportedly in August 1814.
