= London Youth =

London Youth (officially the Federation of London Youth Clubs) is a youth organisation in London. The charity supports the contribution of community-based youth clubs and youth workers, providing them with information, advice, and a wide range of accredited training.

The organisation grew from the ragged schools movement of the 19th century. During the twentieth century there were two separate charities, The Federation of Boys’ Clubs and The Union of Youth Clubs (for girls), which partially grew out of the Soho Club for Working Girls based at 20 Frith Street, Soho. In 1999 these two organisations joined to create The Federation of London Youth Clubs, though the organisation prefers to be called London Youth.

London Youth works directly with young people to create "eye-catching and innovative" new opportunities in partnership with youth clubs at its outdoor activity and training centres. The group also advocates on behalf of its members.
