= Christmas gift (exclamation) =

Traditional exclamation used in the southern United States

"Christmas gift" is an exclamation traced back to the early 1800s in the southern United States. It is derived from the tradition of waking on Christmas morning and rushing to say "Christmas gift" before anyone else. The person being told "Christmas gift!" is expected to present the person saying it to them with a present. While "Merry Christmas" is the common and current seasonal salutation, "Christmas gift" was an equivalent expression used in the rural south and also in southern Pennsylvania, Ohio Valley, West Virginia, and later in northeastern Texas as a simple greeting and recognizing the birth of Christ as a gift.

The greeting is first attested in a letter of Thomas Jefferson on December 25, 1809, mentioning that his grandson "is at this moment running about with his cousins bawling out 'a merry Christmas' 'a Christmas gift' Etc." The Dictionary of American Regional English (DARE) provides citations from 1844 on.

A variant of the tradition is "Christmas Eve gift". The tradition is similar to the "Christmas gift" tradition, but occurs on Christmas Eve. The person being told "Christmas Eve gift!" is expected to present the person saying it to them with a small present, traditionally candy or nuts. DARE traces the first written uses of this version to 1954.

== See also ==
- Christmas
- Christmas Eve
- Holiday Greetings
