= Christmas Present =

A Christmas present is a Christmas gift given in celebration of Christmas.

Christmas Present may also refer to:

- The Ghost of Christmas Present, a character in Charles Dickens' 1843 novella A Christmas Carol
- Christmas Present (film), a 1986 Italian comedy-drama film
- Christmas Present (Andy Williams album), 1974
- Christmas Present (Boney James album), 2007
- Christmas Present (The Statler Brothers album), 1985
- "Christmas Present" (Lighthouse), a 2023 talk show episode
- Merle Haggard's Christmas Present, a 1973 album by Merle Haggard
- Noel's Christmas Presents, a British television show

== See also ==
- Christmas Gift (disambiguation)
