= London Sketchbook (Mozart) =

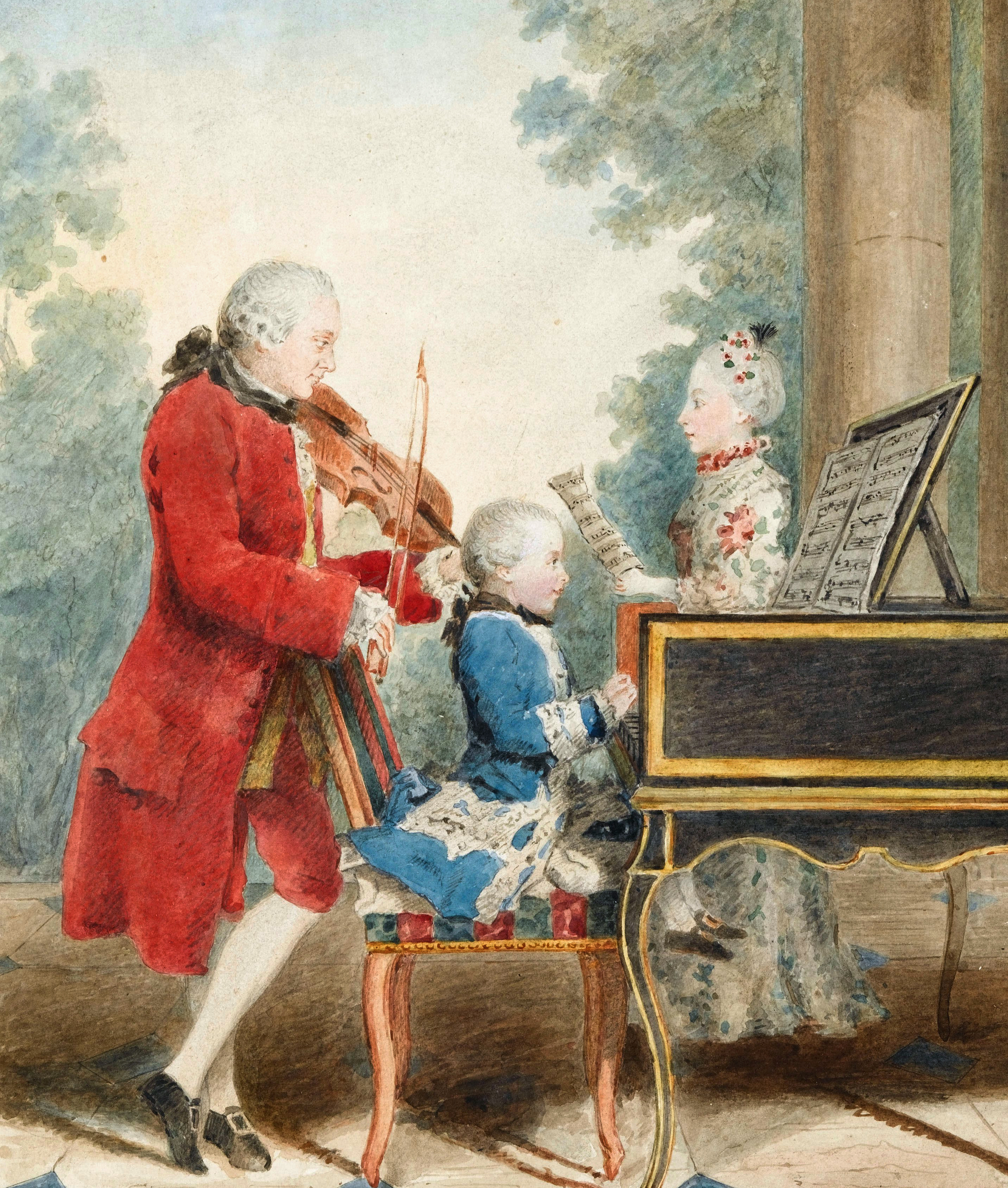
Detail of Carmontelle's Mozart family watercolour

The London Sketchbook (German: Londoner Skizzenbuch), K.15 a–ss (Anh. 109b) is a series of 43 untitled pieces and sketches written by Wolfgang Amadeus Mozart between 1764 and 1765 while in London (see the Mozart family's grand tour). The set of works is denoted by its K^{6} number, followed by its respective letter, i.e. 15a, 15b, 15c, etc.

Most pieces are extremely short, normally lasting from 40 seconds to a minute; however, some span as long as four minutes in total (see K. 15t). According to the Neue Mozart-Ausgabe, the intended purpose of this book was not for musical exercise, as once thought, but rather for the young Mozart, who had just learned how to use pen and ink, to write down his own inspiration without needing anyone's help. Corrections by his father Leopold appear in pencil.

== K.15a–ss ==
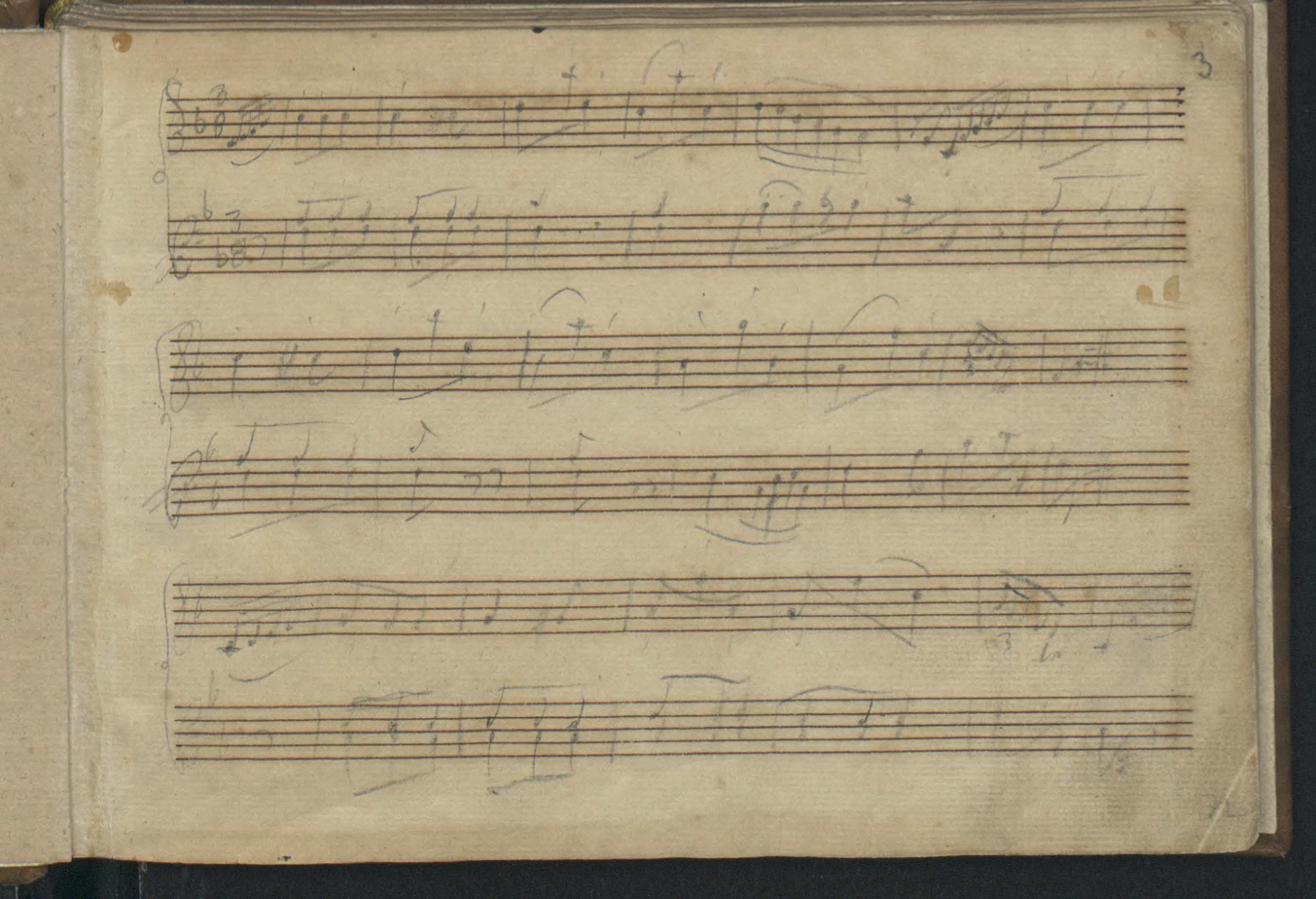
First page of music from Mozart's "Londoner Skizzenbuch" 1764

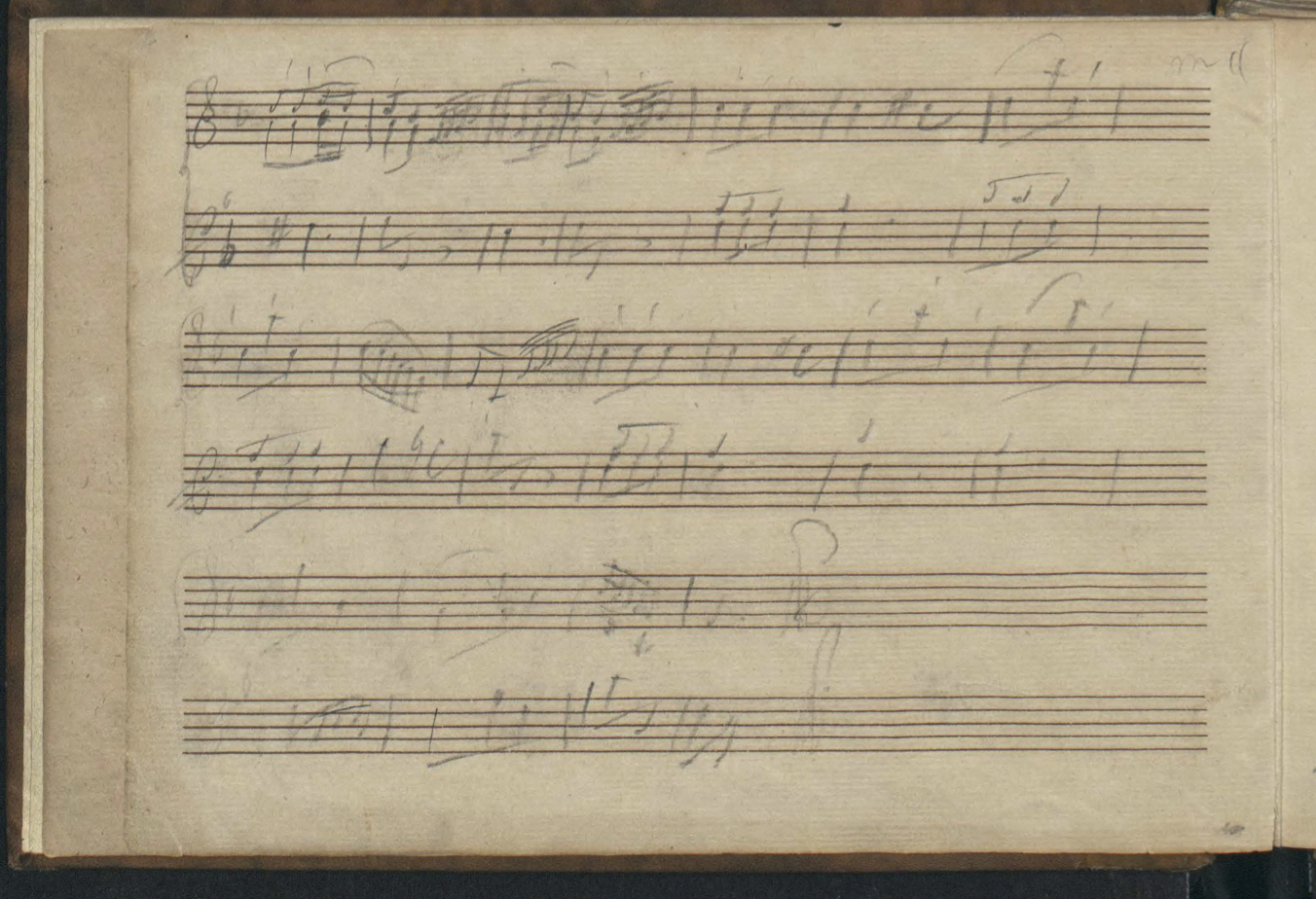
Second page

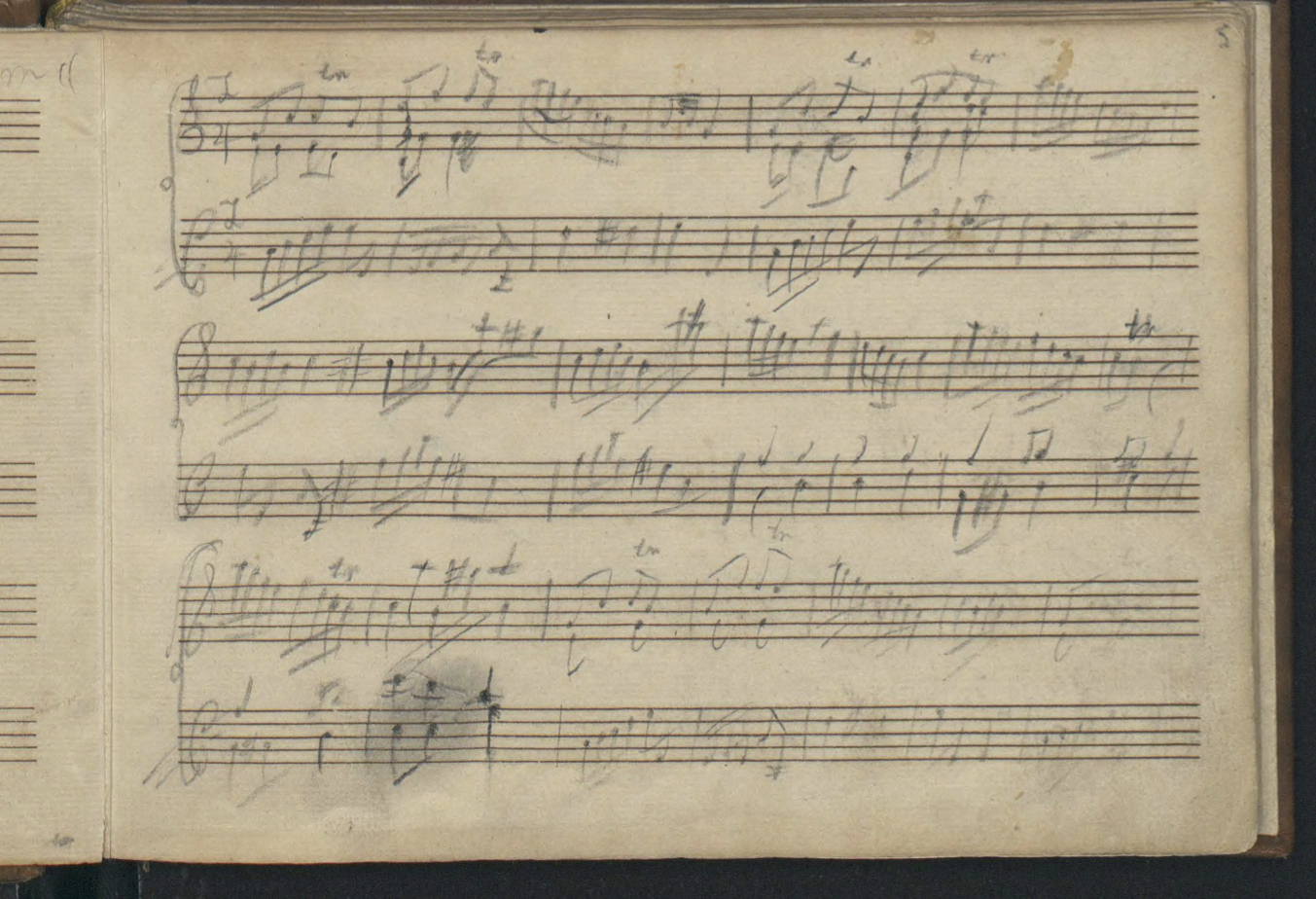
Third page

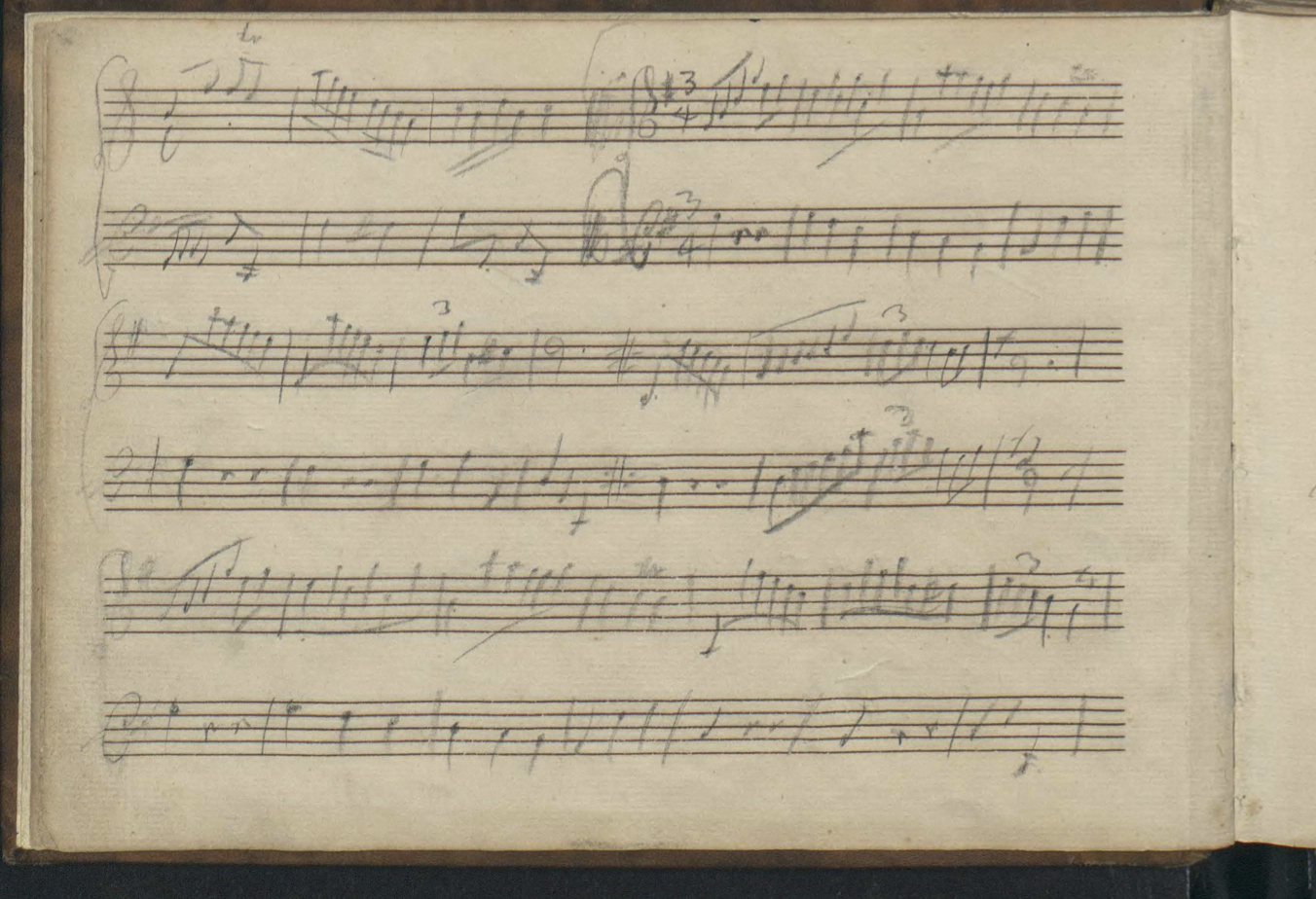
Fourth page

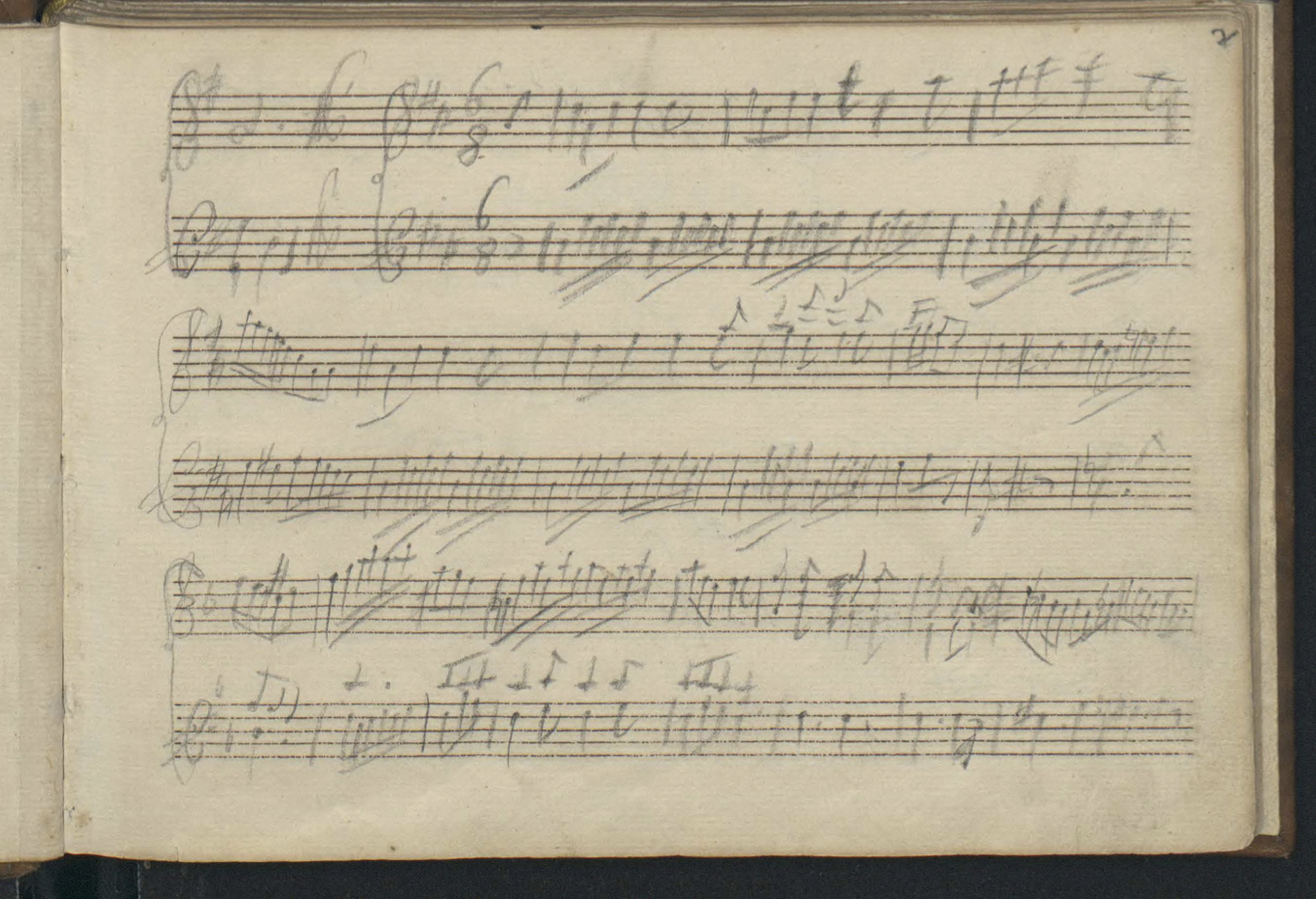
Fifth page

1. 15a – Allegretto in F for piano
2. 15b – Andantino in C for piano
3. 15c – Minuet in G for piano
4. 15d – Rondino in D for piano
5. 15e – Contredanse in G for piano
6. 15f – Minuet in C for piano
7. 15g – Fantasia (Prelude) in G for organ or piano
8. 15h – Contredanse in F for piano
9. 15i – Minuet in A for piano
10. 15k – Minore in A minor for piano
11. 15l – Contredanse in A for piano
12. 15m – Minuet in F for piano
13. 15n – Andante in C for piano
14. 15o – Andante in D for piano
15. 15p – Movement to a Piano Sonata in G minor
16. 15q – Andante in B♭ for piano
17. 15r – Andante in G minor for piano
18. 15s – Rondo in C for piano
19. 15t – Movement to a Piano Sonata in F
20. 15u – Sicilianos in D minor for piano
21. 15v – Movement to a Piano Sonata in F
22. 15w – Allemande in B♭ for piano
23. 15x – Movement to a Piano Sonata in F
24. 15y – Minuet in G for piano
25. 15z – Gigue in C minor for piano
26. 15aa – Movement to a Piano Sonata in B♭
27. 15bb – Movement to a Piano Sonata in D
28. 15cc – Minuet in E♭ for piano
29. 15dd – Andante in A♭ for piano
30. 15ee – Minuet in E♭ for piano
31. 15ff – Minuet in A♭ for piano
32. 15gg – Contredanse in B♭ for piano
33. 15hh – Rondo in F for piano
34. 15ii – Andante in B♭ for piano
35. 15kk – Movement to a Piano Sonata in E♭
36. 15ll – Presto in B♭ for piano
37. 15mm – Andante in E♭ for piano
38. 15nn – Movement to a Piano Sonata in F (fragment)
39. 15oo – German Dance in F for piano
40. 15pp – Minuet in B♭ for piano
41. 15qq – Minuet in E♭ for piano
42. 15rr – Minuet in C for piano (fragment)
43. 15ss – Fugue in C for piano (fragment)

== Notable recordings ==
Several recordings have been made of the Sketchbook in recent years. Most are recorded on their intended instrument, the fortepiano. However, in 1991 with the release of the Complete Mozart Edition, Vol. 45, Erik Smith orchestrated nearly all of the pieces here for winds and orchestra. With his orchestration he also grouped several pieces together to create a full, multiple-movement work. For example, he arranged K. 15b, a, and f as a single divertimento in C. Hans-Udo Kreuels also did a recording of the Sketchbook in 2003, as well as completing two of the fragmented works, K.15rr, and 15ss.

== Sources ==
- (in German) Wolfgang Plath. Neue Mozart-Ausgabe, Series IX (Keyboard Music), Workgroup 27 (Keyboard Pieces), Volume 1: Notebooks. Bärenreiter, 1982.
