= Bar Italia =

Italian cafe on Frith Street in Soho, London

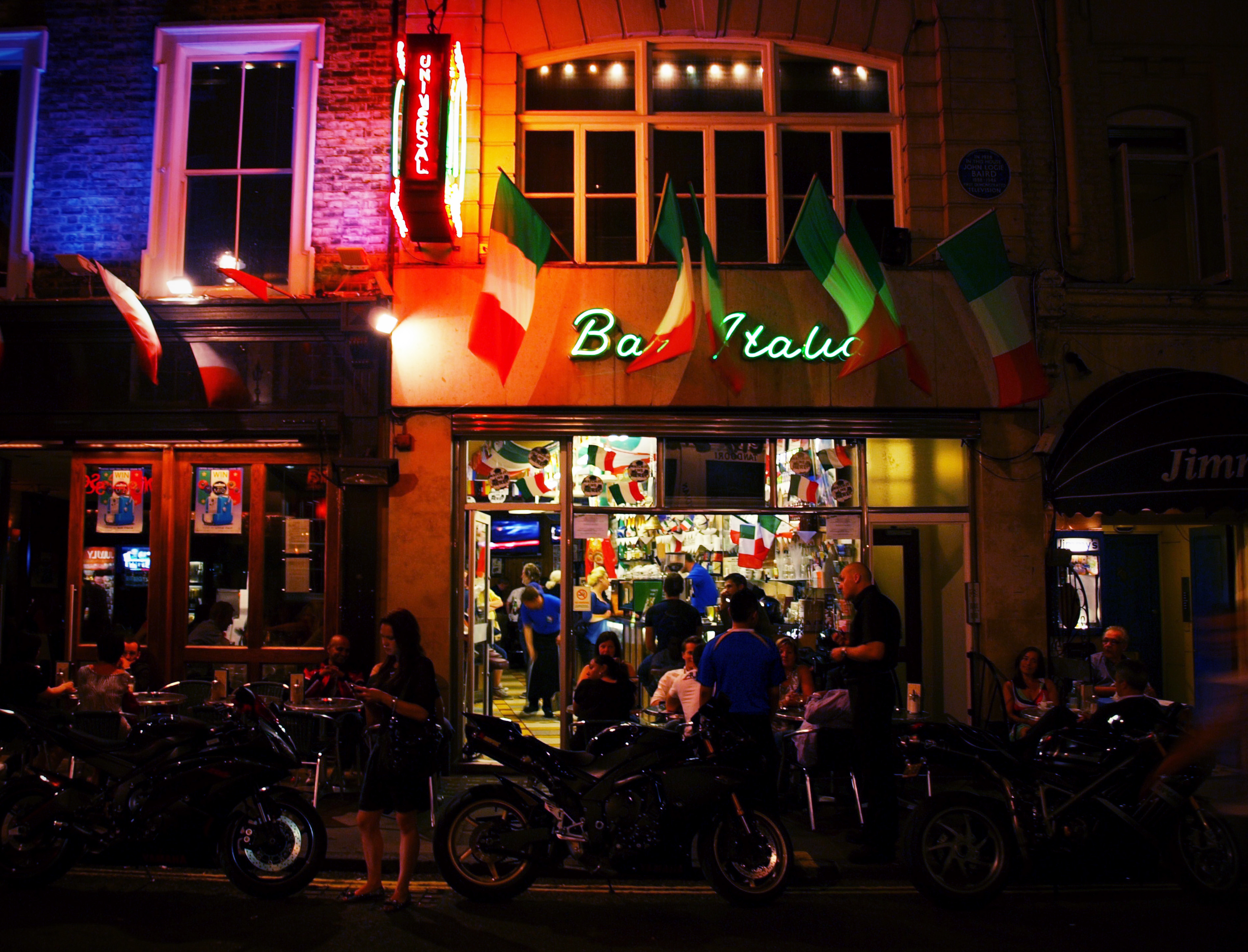
- Front exterior of Bar Italia, 2009
- Interactive map of Bar Italia

Restaurant information
- Established: 1949 (77 years ago)
- Owners: Veronica and Anthony Polledr
- Food type: Italian cuisine; café style
- Location: Frith Street, Soho, London, W1D 4RF, U.K.
- Coordinates: 51°30′48″N 0°07′53″W
- Website: baritaliasoho.co.uk

Bar Italia is an Italian café located on Frith Street in the Soho district of London, United Kingdom.

== Location and notable events ==
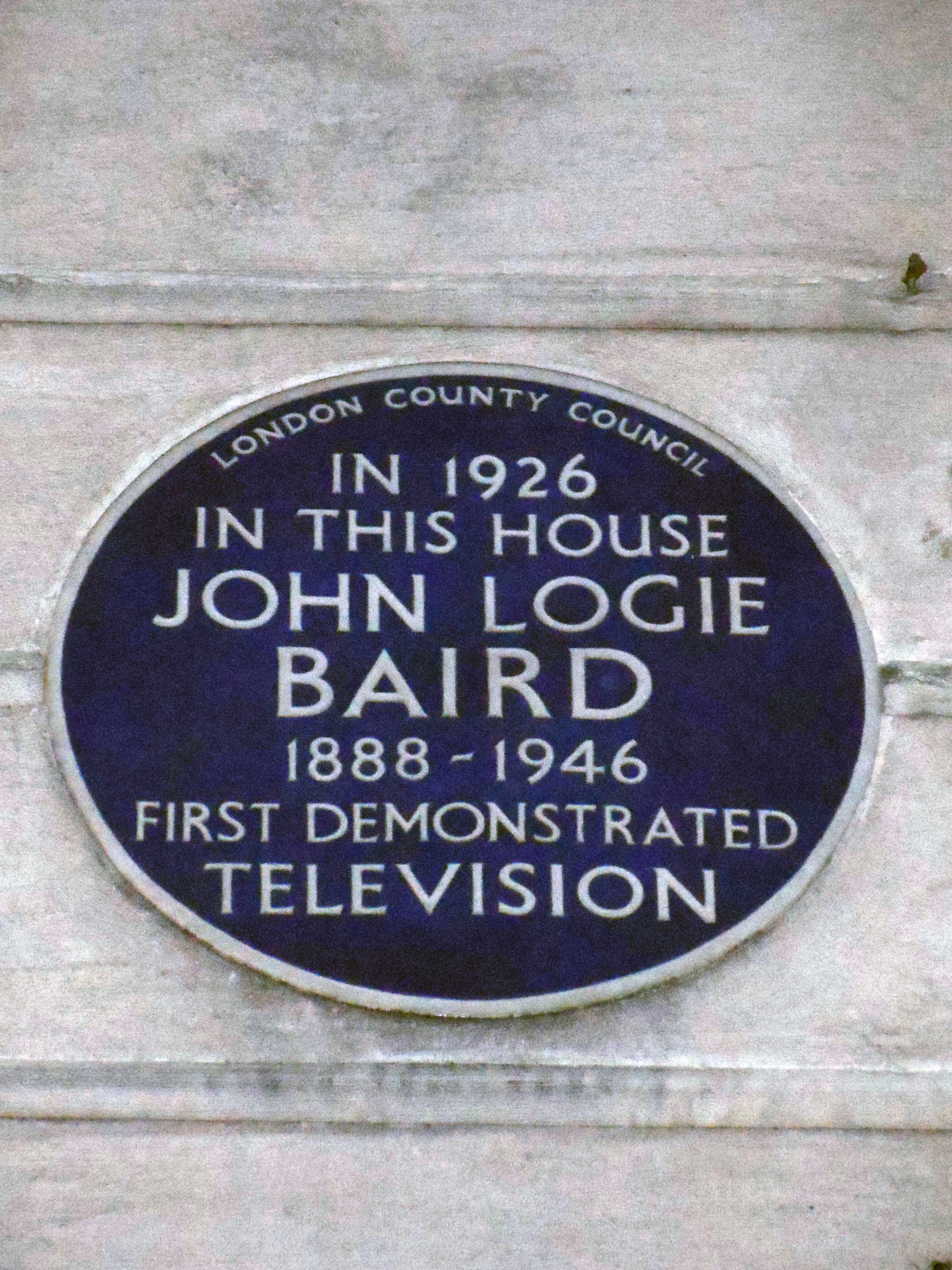
Blue plaque marking Baird's first demonstration of television at 22 Frith Street

On 26 January 1926, John Logie Baird gave the first public demonstration of television at 22 Frith Street, the building where Bar Italia is located. The blue plaque above the front door commemorates this event.

Bar Italia in its present form was opened as a café in 1949 by the Polledri family, and is still owned by Veronica and Anthony Polledri.

== In popular culture ==
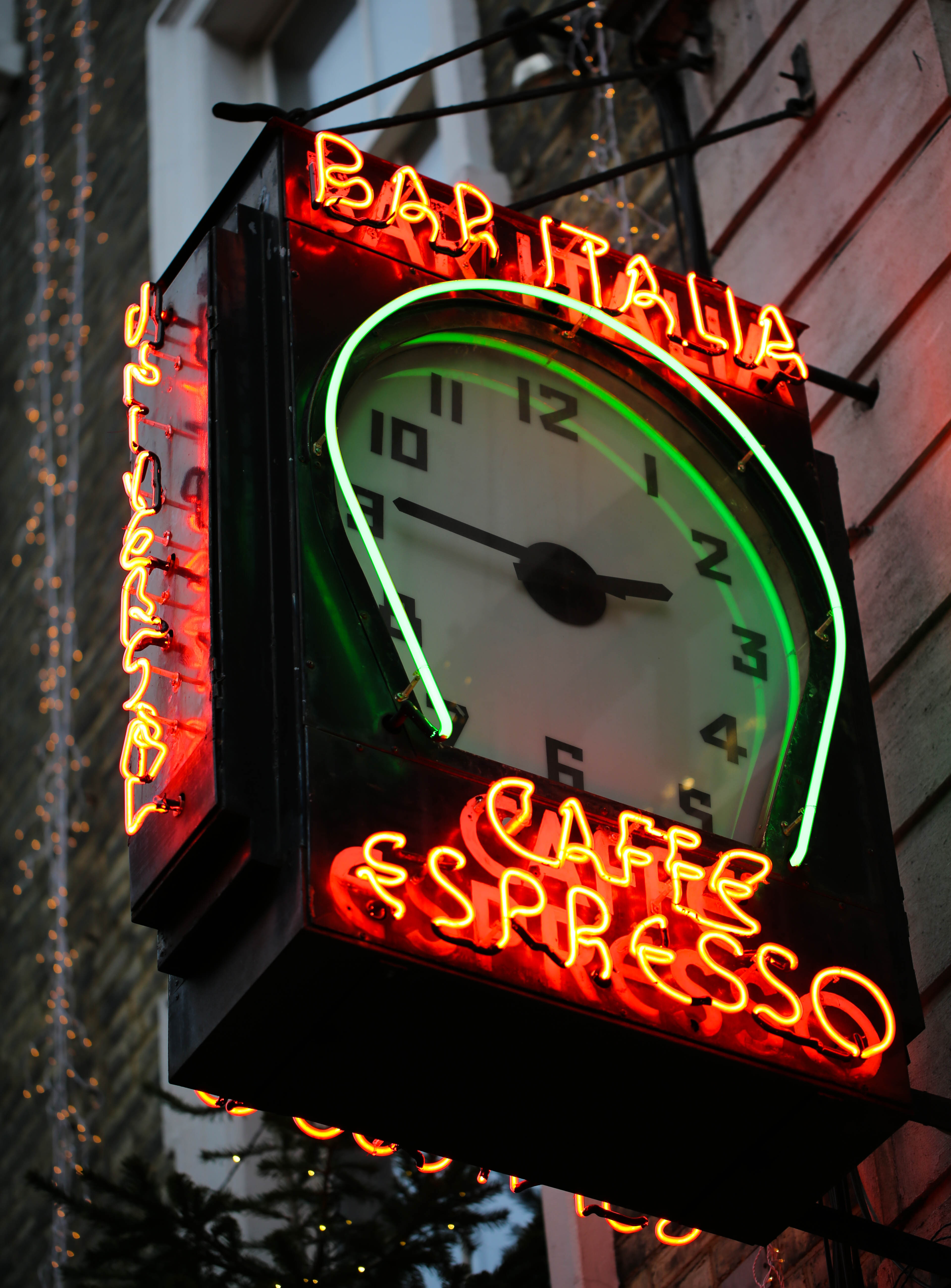
Exterior clock sign (2013).

Bar Italia inspired the song of the same name by the band Pulp, which is the last track of its 1995 album Different Class. The song describes the cafe as "round the corner in Soho" and "where all the broken people go".

In November 2010, it was announced that Dave Stewart and Ian La Frenais were writing a stage musical about the café which is to be called Bar Italia. Stewart was quoted as saying, "This coffee shop is very small but what goes on in there is as big as the world".

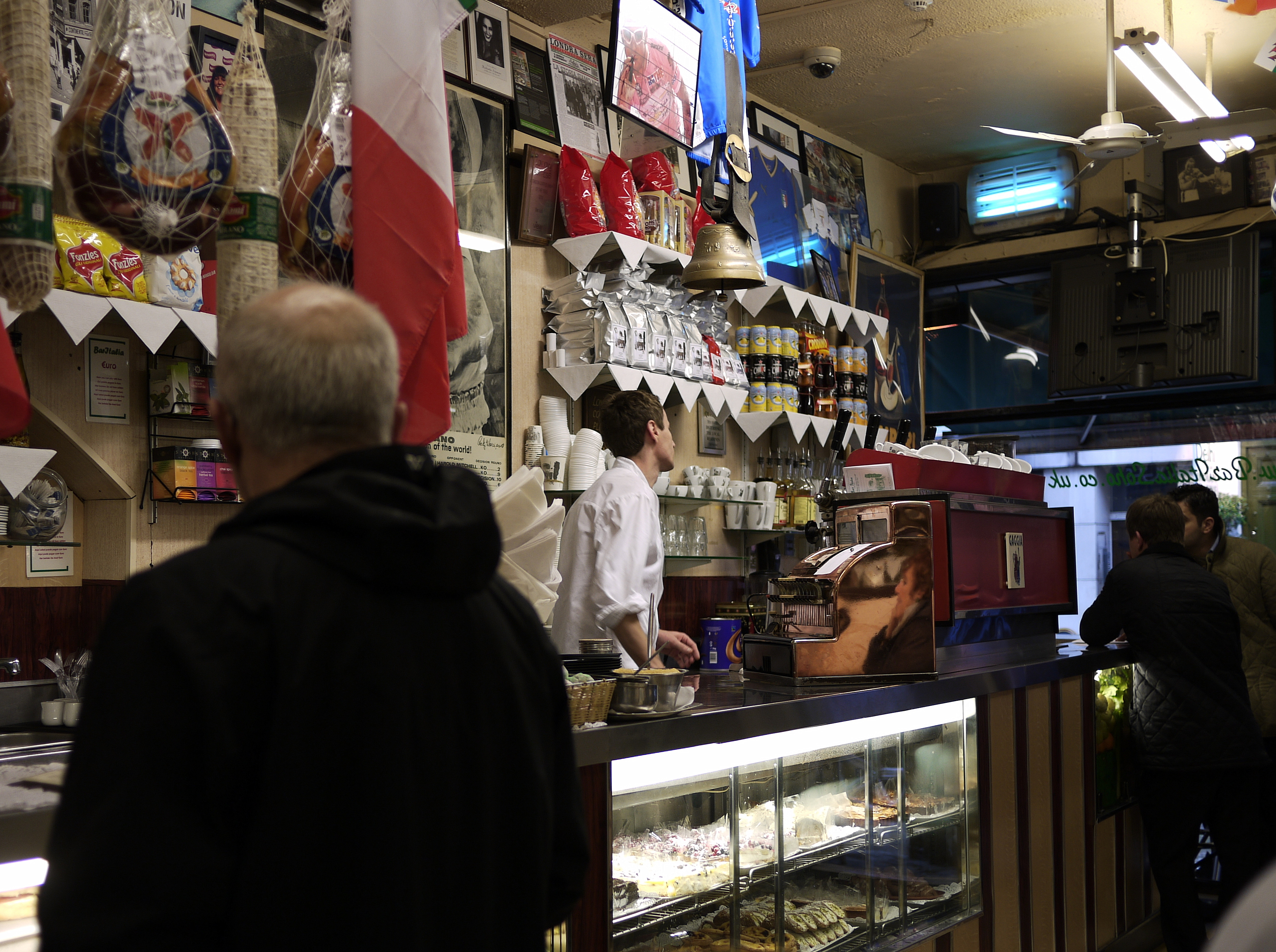
Inside Bar Italia (2012).

In July 2011, British artist Ed Gray unveiled a painting of Bar Italia featuring patrons (and actors) Rupert Everett and John Hurt. It now hangs in the café's window.

In 2015, Carl Randall painted the portrait of film poducer Jeremy Thomas standing in front of Bar Italia, as part of the artist's 'London Portraits' series, where he asked various cultural figures to choose a place in London for the backdrop of their portraits. In an interview, Thomas explained he chose Bar Italia for this portrait "because I like being there, I go there regularly, I feel comfortable there....there's a bohemianism in this place and it's full of memories of mine since I was a lad". A print of the painting hangs on the café's wall.

Formed in 2019, the British alternative-rock band Bar Italia named itself after the café.

== Awards ==
Bar Italia was awarded the 2010 London Lifestyle Award for London Coffee Shop of the Year.

== See also ==
- Italian cuisine
- List of Italian restaurants
- List of restaurants in London
