= Frith Street =

Street in Soho, London

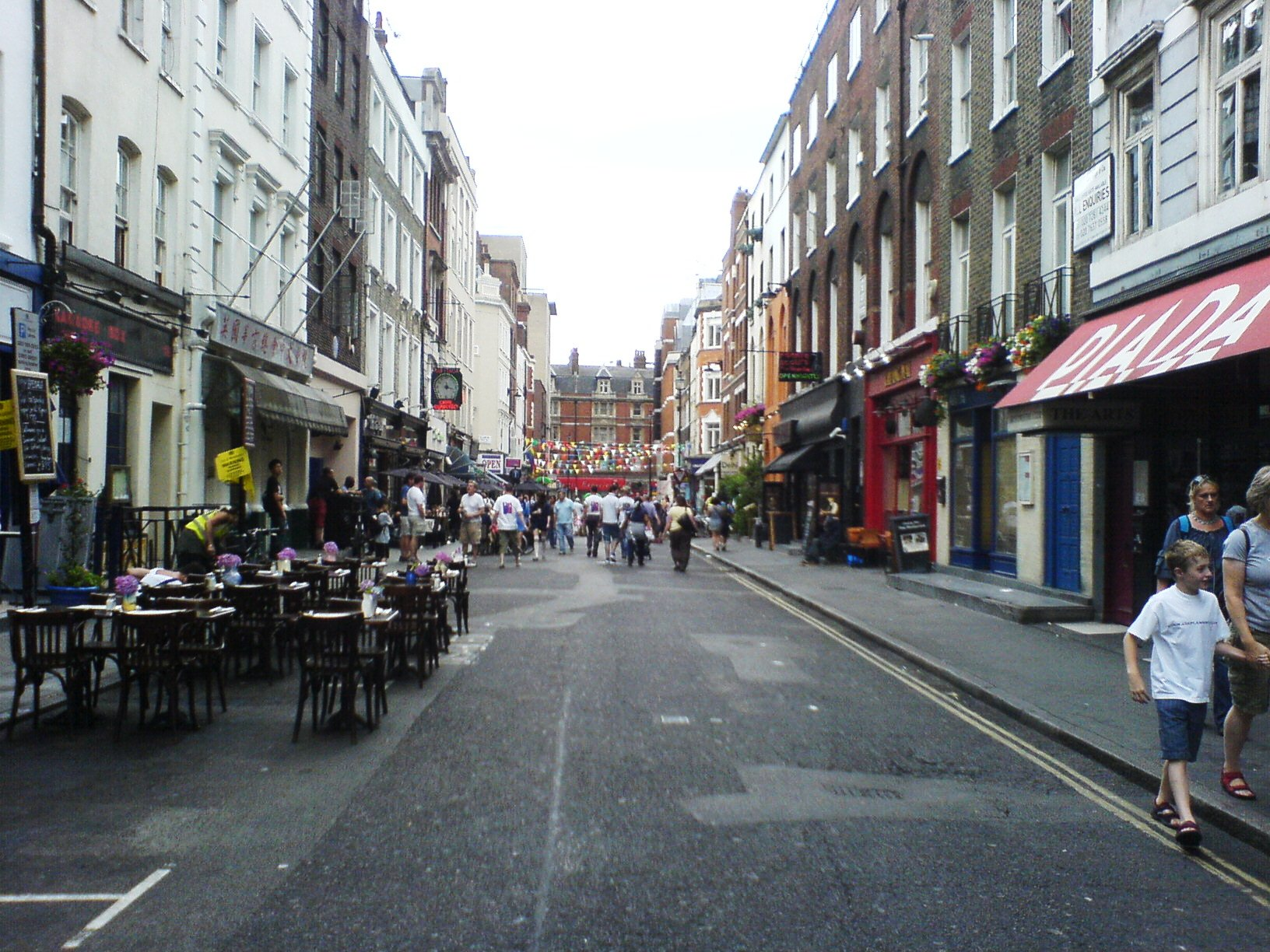
- Frith Street facing south early on a July morning

- Location within Greater London
- Type: Street
- Area: Soho
- Location: London
- Coordinates: 51°30′51″N 0°07′55″W
- North end: Soho Square
- South end: Shaftesbury Avenue

Construction
- Completion: 1670s

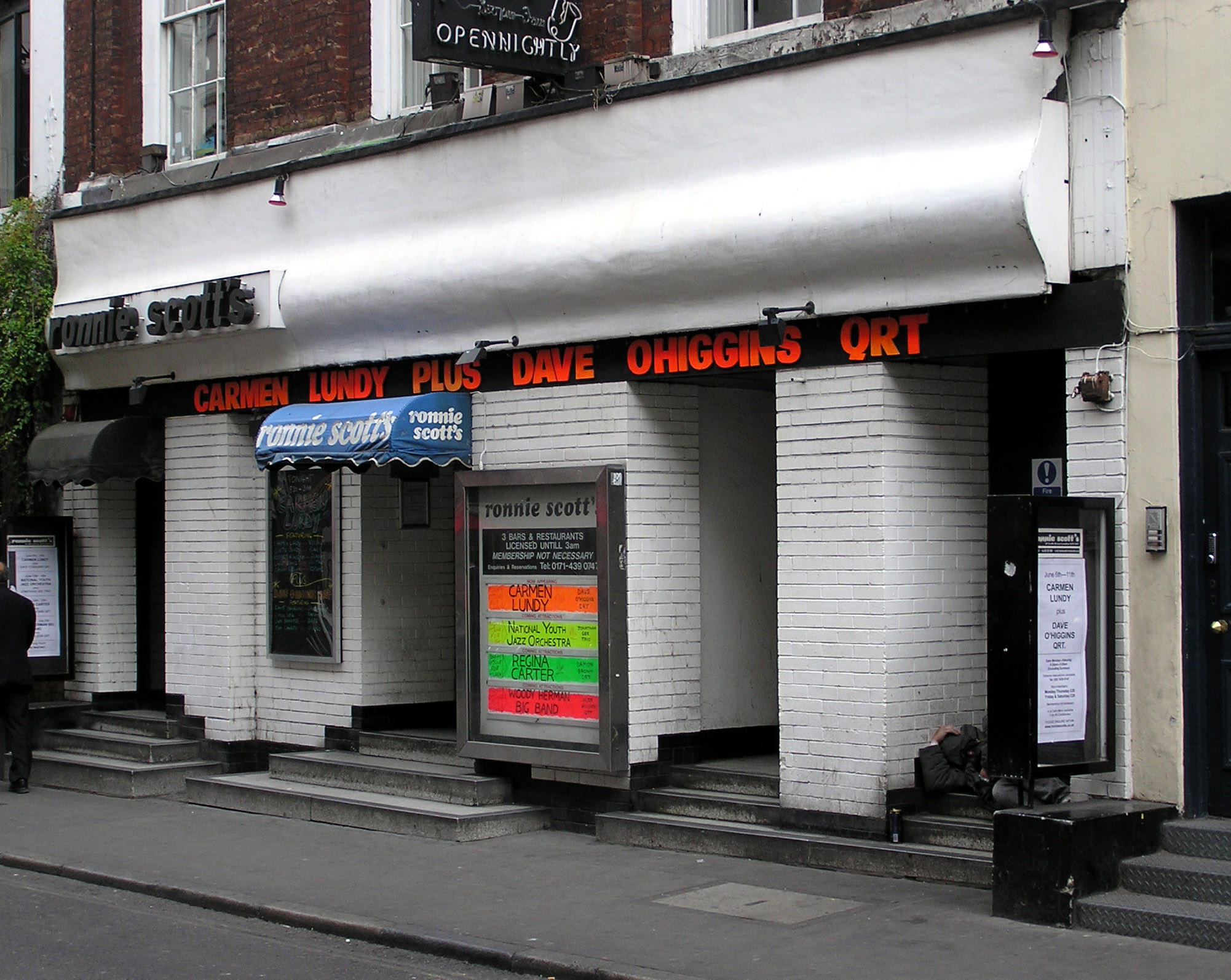
Ronnie Scott's Jazz Club at 47 Frith Street.

Frith Street is in the Soho area of London. To the north is Soho Square and to the south is Shaftesbury Avenue. The street crosses Old Compton Street, Bateman Street and Romilly Street.

== History ==
Frith Street was laid out in the late 1670s and early 1680s and evidently named after Richard Frith, a wealthy builder. In the 18th and early 19th centuries many artistic and literary people came to live in Soho, and several of them settled in this street. The painter John Alexander Gresse was here in 1784, the year of his death. John Horne Tooke, philologist and politician, lived here in about 1804; John Constable lived here in 1810–11; John Bell, the sculptor, in 1832–33; and William Hazlitt wrote his last essays while he was lodging at no. 6 Frith Street prior to his death there in 1830. Vincent Novello and his son Alfred ran their music publishing business at 67 Frith St from 1829. The lithographic artist Alfred Concanen had a studio at no. 12 for many years.

Samuel Romilly, the legal reformer, was born at no. 18 in 1757, and the young Wolfgang Amadeus Mozart lodged at no. 20 with his father and sister in 1764–65. In 1816 the actor William Charles Macready was living at no. 64, and over a hundred years later, from 1924 to 1926 John Logie Baird lived at no. 22 where on 26 January 1926 he demonstrated television to members of the Royal Institution.

In 1989 Frith Street Gallery was founded here, originally occupying two adjacent townhouses. Initially it was a forum for contemporary drawing, then it expanded into a wide range of artistic media. In 2007 the gallery moved to Golden Square, just a short distance from Frith Street.

== Today ==
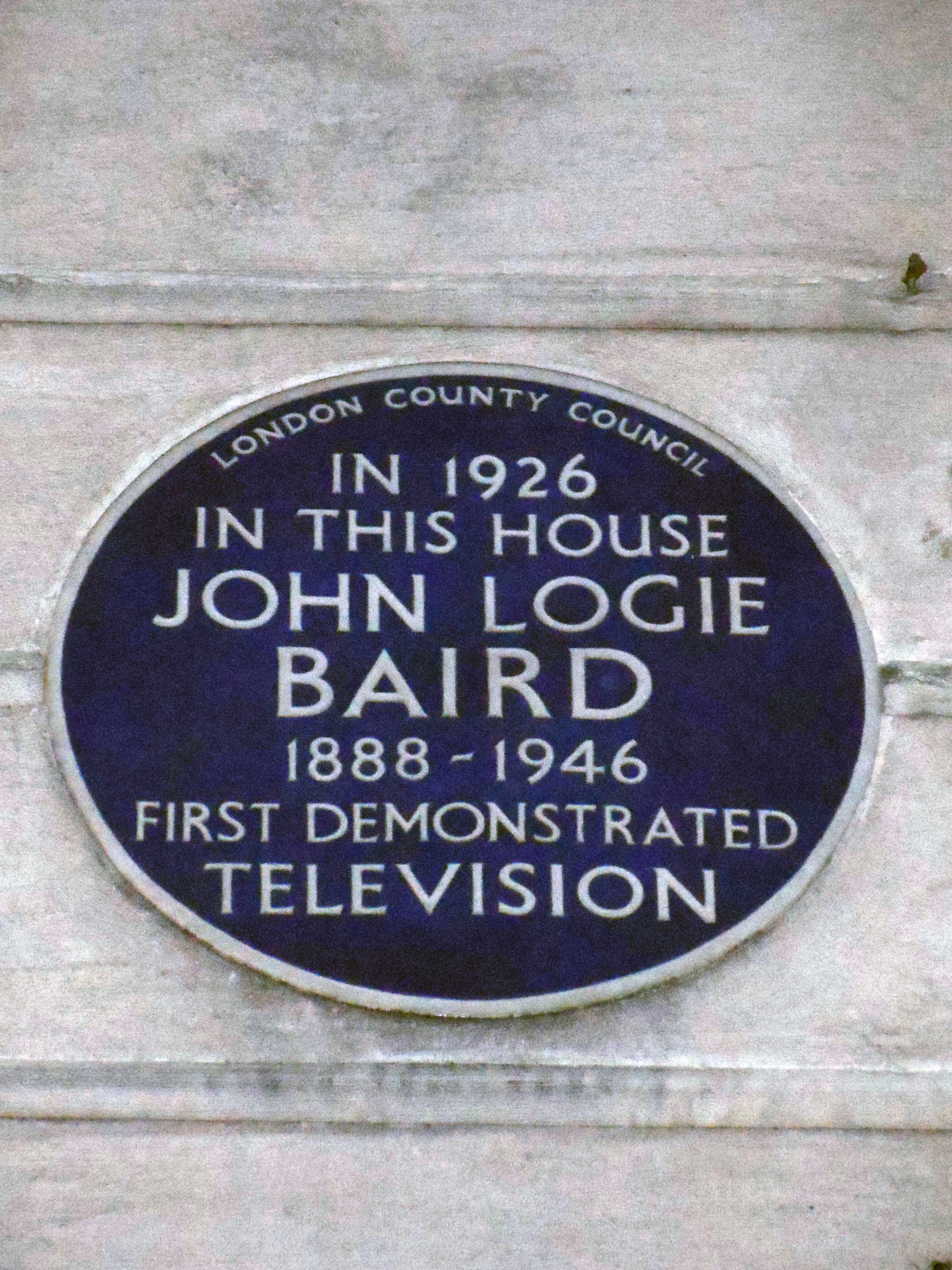
Blue plaque marking Baird's first demonstration of television at 22 Frith Street

The coffee shop Bar Italia occupies no. 22 and there is a blue plaque over the door to commemorate Baird's TV experiments. Ronnie Scott's Jazz Club has been at no. 47 since 1965.

== In popular culture ==
Frith Street is mentioned twice in the lyrics of the 2007 song Glorious by Australian-British singer Natalie Imbruglia, in the first verse and at the end of the song.

== See also ==
- 20 Frith Street
- Ethel Kibblewhite
- List of eponymous roads in London
