= HMY Victoria and Albert (1843) =

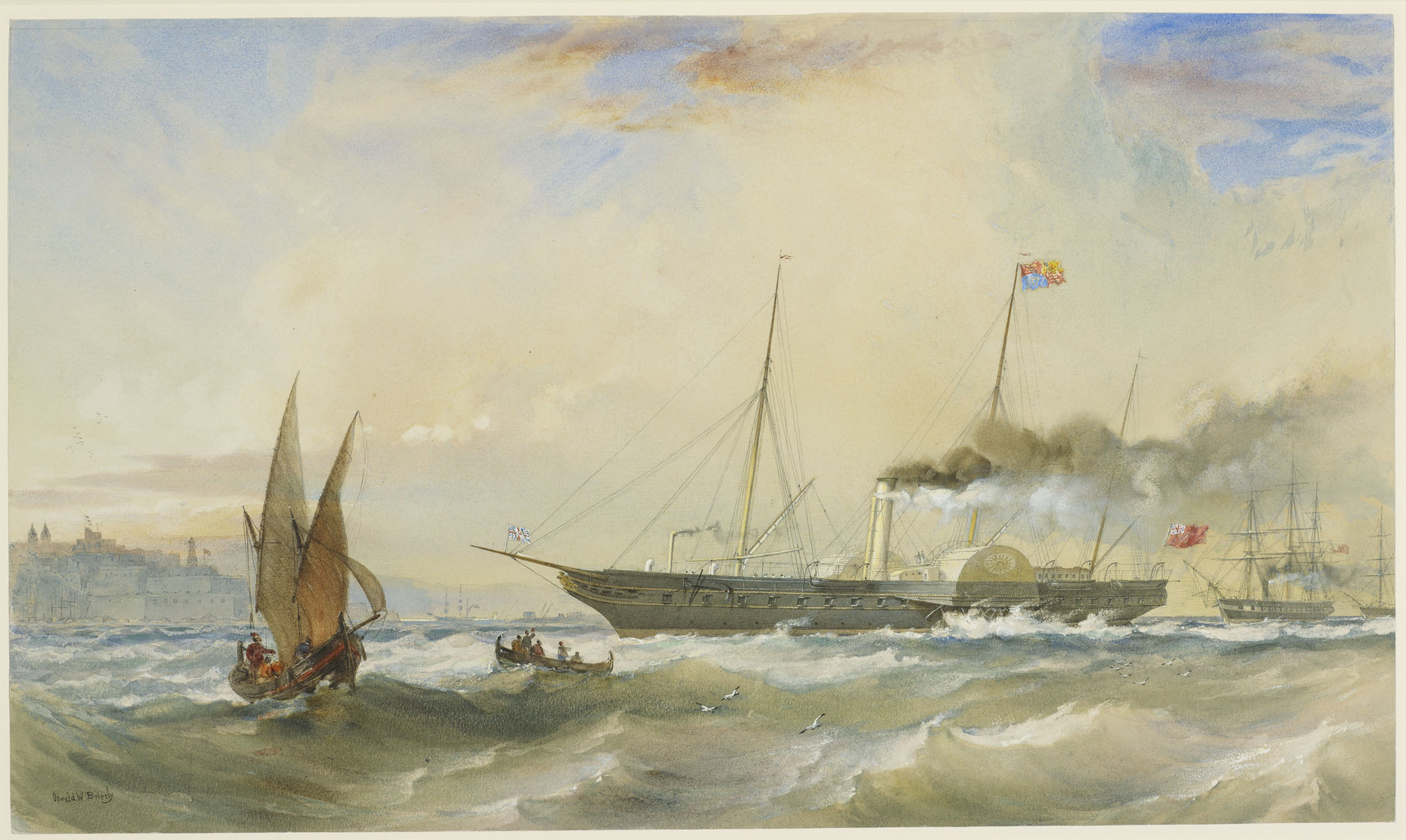
- The Osborne with the Prince of Wales on board, going into Malta Harbour, attended by HMS Magicienne and HMS Doris, 5 June 1862

History
- Namesake: Queen Victoria and Albert, Prince Consort
- Builder: Pembroke Dock
- Laid down: 1842
- Launched: 25 April 1843
- Renamed: Osborne, 1855
- Fate: Scrapped, 1868

General characteristics
- Type: Royal Yacht
- Tons burthen: 1034
- Installed power: 430 hp (320 kW) steam engine
- Propulsion: Twin paddles
- Armament: 2 guns

HMY Victoria and Albert was a twin-paddle steamer launched 25 April 1843. She functioned as a royal yacht of the sovereign of the United Kingdom, owned and operated by the Royal Navy, and was the first of three royal yachts to be named Victoria and Albert. She was laid down in 1842 at Pembroke Dock and was designed by William Symonds. She measured 1,034 tons burthen, carried two guns, and was the first royal yacht to be steam powered, being fitted with a 430 horsepower (320 kW) engine.

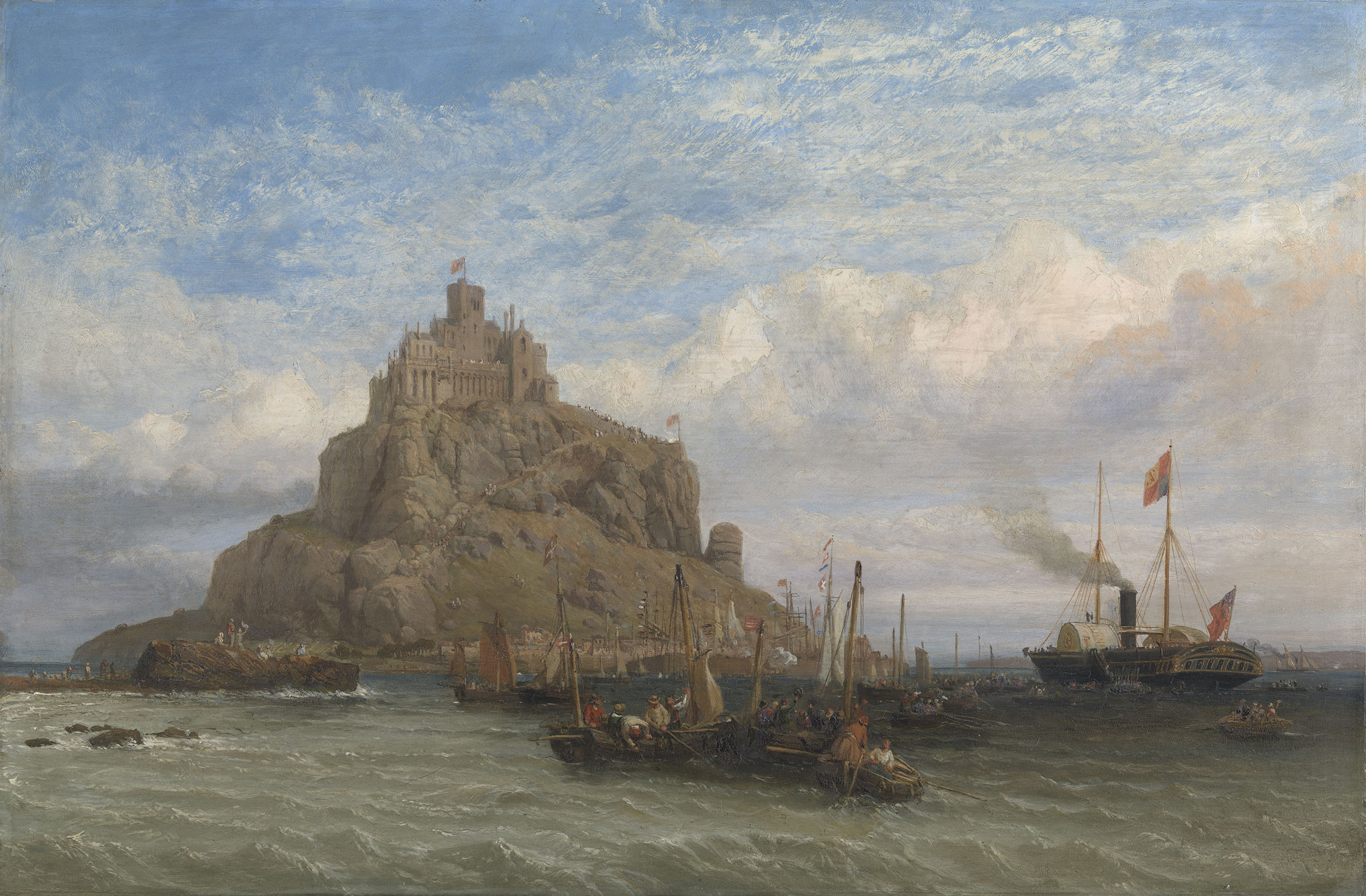
The Royal Yacht Passing St Michael's Mount by Clarkson Stanfield, 1846

Steam yachts, first introduced in 1823, became popular amongst Victorian millionaires and Royalty around Europe. In 1846 she carried Queen Victoria and Albert on a trip to Cornwall. The painter Clarkson Stanfield was commissioned to produce a painting of the scene The Royal Yacht Passing St Michael's Mount.

She was lengthened in 1853. She was 200 feet and emerged at 260 x 33 x 22 feet, displacement 1,382 tons, with new engines of 600 horsepower (450 kW).

She made twenty voyages. She was renamed Osborne, after the launch of HMY Victoria and Albert on 16 January 1855.

Her Majesty's Yacht Osborne continued in service, conveying the Royal Family to their summer home, Osborne House, on the Isle of Wight. She was named after the Queen's new estate.

In the 1861 Census, Osborne, 'and her hulk Blonde' had on board, Master Commanding G H K Bowers; a master, boatswain, assistant engineer, quartermaster, 2 carpenters, 11 seamen, 3 stokers and 6 boys.

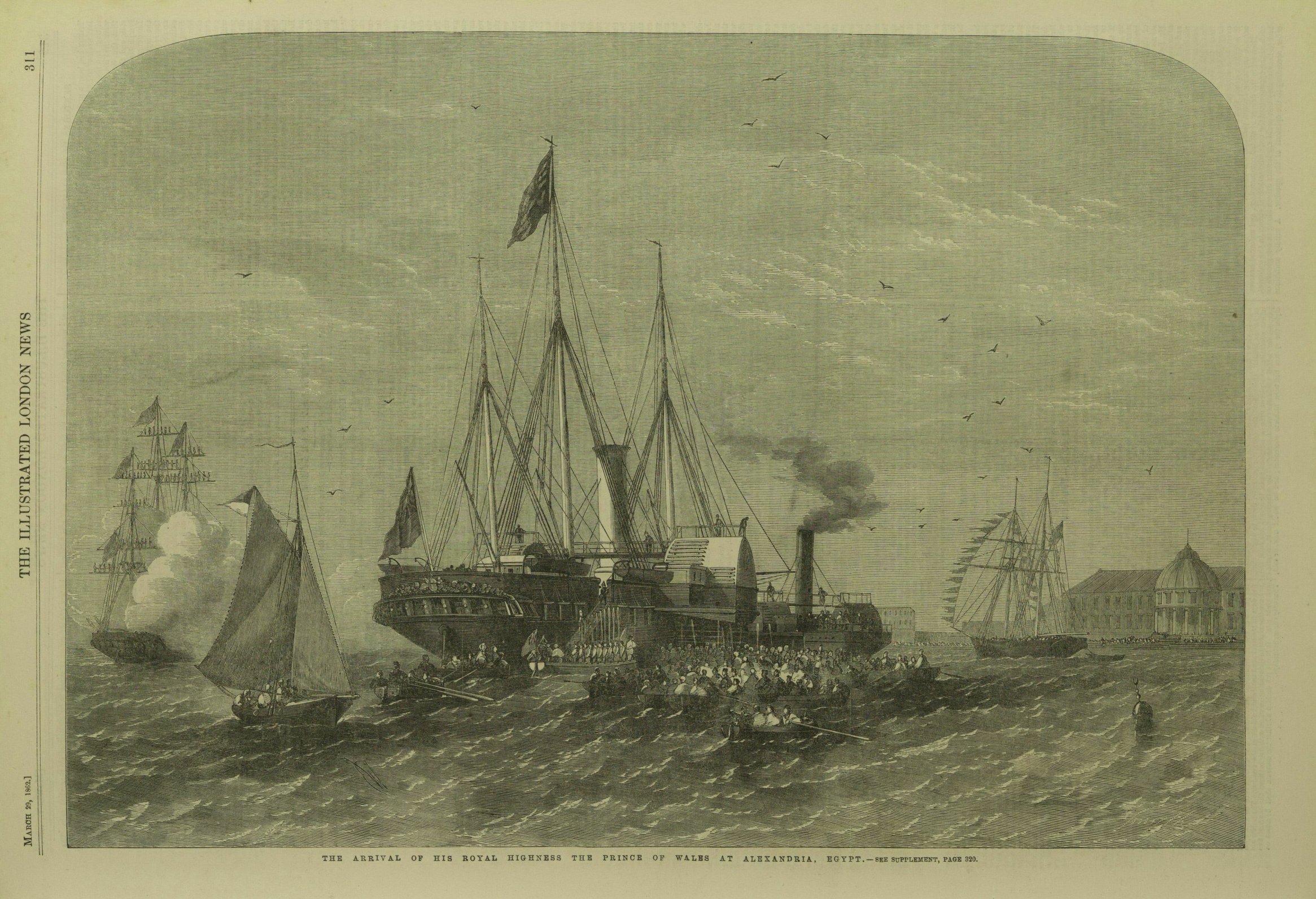
HMY Osborne at Alexandria, 1862

On 15 February 1862 the Prince of Wales boarded Osborne at Triest, having arrived by train. The Royal party stopped at Venice, the Dalmatian Coast, Corfu and Ionian Islands. She received a 21 gun salute at Alexandria. The tour continued via Jaffa, Constantinople, Athens, Malta and France, to return by train.

Osborne was scrapped in 1868.c.

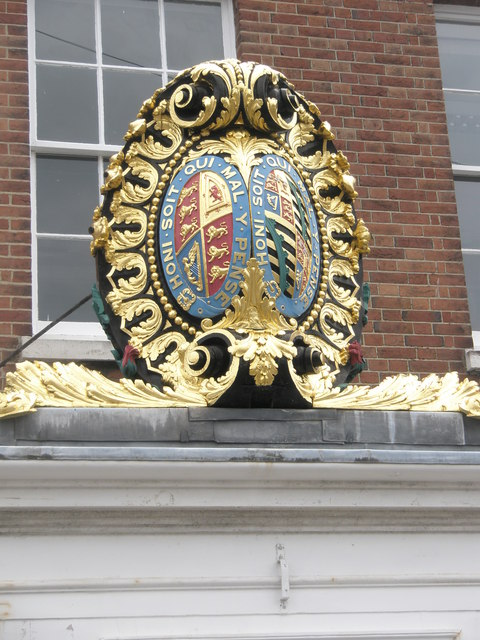
The ship's figurehead is preserved above the door of the South Office Block in Portsmouth's Royal Dockyard.

== Bibliography ==
- Jones, Colin (1996). "Entente Cordiale, 1865". In McLean, David & Preston, Antony (eds.). Warship 1996. London: Conway Maritime Press. ISBN 0-85177-685-X.
