= List of compositions by Felix Mendelssohn =

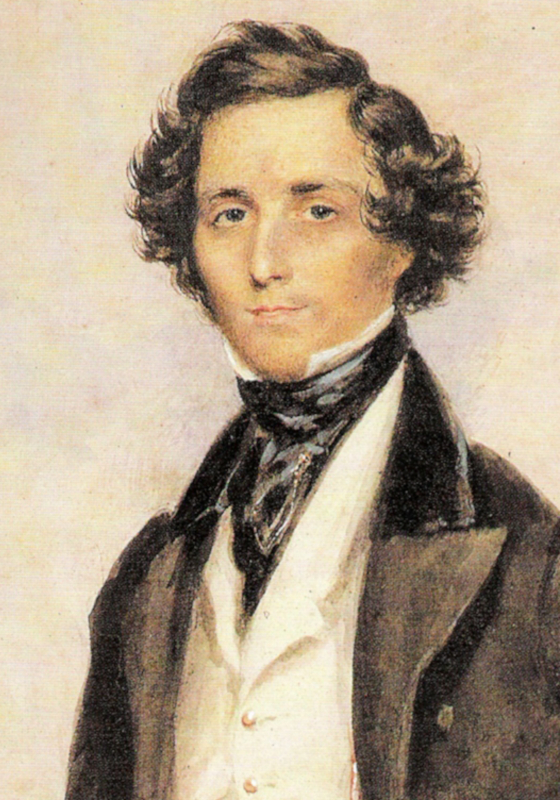
Portrait of Mendelssohn (1809–1847) by the English miniaturist James Warren Childe (1778–1862), dated 1829

This is a list of compositions by Felix Mendelssohn.

== Listed by opus number ==
(Note: the list includes works which were published posthumously and given opus numbers after the composer's death. Only the opus numbers 1 to 72 were assigned by Mendelssohn, the later ones by publishers. The opus number sequence does not therefore always accord with the order of composition). The list also includes the Mendelssohn-Werkverzeichnis classification code (MWV).

=== Works with opus number assigned by Mendelssohn ===
==== Op. 1–20 ====
- Op. 1, Piano Quartet No. 1 in C minor (1822) (MWV Q 11)
- Op. 2, Piano Quartet No. 2 in F minor (1823) (MWV Q 13)
- Op. 3, Piano Quartet No. 3 in B minor (1824/25) (MWV Q 17)
- Op. 4, Violin Sonata (No. 2) in F minor (1823) (MWV Q 12)
- Op. 5, Capriccio in F♯ minor for piano (1825) (MWV U 50)
- Op. 6, Piano Sonata No. 1 in E major (1826) (MWV U 54) (actually the composer's 2nd Piano Sonata)
- Op. 7, (7) Pièces caractéristiques for piano (1827)
  1. Sanft und mit Empfindung (MWV U 56)
  2. Mit heftiger Bewegung (MWV U 44)
  3. Kräftig und feurig (MWV U 59)
  4. Schnell und beweglich (MWV U 55)
  5. Ernst und mit steigender Lebhaftigkeit (MWV U 60)
  6. Sehnsüchtig (MWV U 61)
  7. Leicht und luftig (MWV U 62)
- Op. 8, 12 Songs for voice and piano (1824/28)
  1. "Minnelied im Mai: Holder klingt der Vogelsang" (MWV K 30)
  2. "Das Heimweh: Was ist's das mir den Atem hemmet" (composed by Fanny Hensel, but published under Felix's name)
  3. "Italien: Schöner und schöner schmückt sich" (composed by Fanny Hensel)
  4. "Erntelied: Es ist ein Schnitter, der heißt Tod" (MWV K 37)
  5. "Pilgerspruch: Laß dich nur nichts nicht dauern" (MWV K 31)
  6. "Frühlingslied. In schwäb. Mundart: Jetzt kommt der Frühling" (MWV K 17)
  7. "Maienlied: Man soll hören süßes Singen" (MWV K 32)
  8. "Hexenlied. Andres Maienlied: Die Schwalbe fliegt" (MWV K 33)
  9. "Abendlied: Das Tagewerk ist abgethan" (MWV K 34)
  10. "Romanze: Einmal aus seinen Blicken" (MWV K 35)
  11. "Im Grünen: Willkommen im Grünen" (MWV K 36)
  12. "Suleika und Hatem: An des lust'gen Brunnens Rand" (composed by Fanny Hensel)
- Op. 9, 12 Lieder for voice and piano (1829/30)
  1. "Frage: Ist es wahr?" (MWV K 39)
  2. "Geständnis: Kennst du nicht das Gluthverlangen" (MWV K 41)
  3. "Wartend (Romanze): Sie trug einen Falken" (MWV K 42)
  4. "Im Frühling: Ihr frühlingstrunknen Blumem" (MWV K 52)
  5. "Im Herbst: Ach wie schnell die Tage fliehen" (MWV K 38)
  6. "Scheidend: Wie so gelinde die Fluth bewegt" (MWV K 50)
  7. "Sehnsucht: Fern und ferner schallt der Reigen" (composed by Fanny Hensel)
  8. "Frühlingsglaube: Die linden Lüfte sind erwacht" (MWV K 51)
  9. "Ferne: In weite Ferne will ich träumen" (MWV K 53)
  10. "Verlust: Und wussten's die Blumen" (composed by Fanny Hensel)
  11. "Entsagung: Herr, zu dir will ich mich retten" (MWV K 54)
  12. "Die Nonne: Im stillen Klostergarten" (composed by Fanny Hensel)
- Op. 10, Die Hochzeit des Camacho (The Marriage of Camacho) (Singspiel) (1825) (MWV L 5)
- Op. 11, Symphony No. 1 in C minor (1824) (MWV N 13)
- Op. 12, String Quartet No. 1 in E♭ major (1829) (MWV R 25) (actually composed after Op. 13)
- Op. 13, String Quartet No. 2 in A minor (1827) (MWV R 22) (actually the composer's 1st mature String Quartet)
- Op. 14, Rondo capriccioso in E major for piano (1830) (MWV U 67)
- Op. 15, Fantasia on "The Last Rose of Summer" in E major for piano (1827) (MWV U 74)
- Op. 16, (3) Fantasies or Caprices for piano (1829)
  1. Fantasia in A minor (MWV U 70)
  2. Caprice or Scherzo in E minor (MWV U 71)
  3. Fantasia in E major ("The Rivulet") (MWV U 72)
- Op. 17, Variations concertantes in D major for cello and piano (1829) (MWV Q 19)
- Op. 18, String Quintet No. 1 in A major (1826/32) (MWV R 21)
- Op. 19a, 6 Songs for voice and piano (1830/34)
  1. "Frühlingslied: In dem Walde, süsse Tone" (MWV K 56)
  2. "Das erste Veilchen: Als ich das erste Veilchen erblickt" (MWV K 63)
  3. "Winterlied: Mein Sohn, wo willst du hin so spät" (MWV K 72)
  4. "Neue Liebe: In dem Mondenschein im Walde" (MWV K 70)
  5. "Gruss: Leise zieht durch mein Gemüth" (MWV K 71)
  6. "Reiselied: Bringet des treusten Herzens Grüsse" (MWV K 65)
- Op. 19b, Songs Without Words for piano, Book I (1829/30)
  1. Andante con moto in E major (MWV U 86)
  2. Andante espressivo in A minor (MWV U 80)
  3. Molto allegro e vivace in A major ("Hunting Song") (MWV U 89)
  4. Moderato in A major (MWV U 73)
  5. Poco agitato in F♯ minor (MWV U 90)
  6. Andante sostenuto in G minor ("Venezianisches Gondellied" [Venetian Boat Song] No. 1) (MWV U 78)
- Op. 20, String Octet in E♭ major for double String Quartet (1825) (MWV R 20)

==== Op. 21–40 ====
- Op. 21, A Midsummer Night's Dream, Overture in E major for orchestra (1826) (MWV P 3)
- Op. 22, Capriccio Brillant in B minor for piano and orchestra (1832) (MWV O 8)
- Op. 23, Kirchenmusik/3 Sacred pieces for soloists, choir, and organ/ensemble (1830)
  1. Aus tiefer Not schrei' ich zu dir (MWV B 20)
  2. Ave Maria (MWV B 19)
  3. Mitten wir im Leben sind (MWV B 21)
- Op. 24, Overture in C major for wind instruments (1824/38) (MWV P 1)
- Op. 25, Piano Concerto No. 1 in G minor (1831) (MWV O 7)
- Op. 26, The Hebrides or Fingal's Cave, Overture in B minor for orchestra (1830/32). (MWV P 7)
- Op. 27, Meeresstille und glückliche Fahrt (Calm Sea and Prosperous Voyage), Overture in D major for orchestra (1828) (MWV P 5)
- Op. 28, Fantasia in F♯ minor for piano ("Sonate écossaise") (1833) (MWV U 92)
- Op. 29, Rondo brillant in E♭ major for piano and orchestra (1834) (MWV O 10)
- Op. 30, Songs Without Words for piano, Book II (1833/34)
  1. Andante espressivo in E♭ major (MWV U 103)
  2. Allegro di molto in B♭ minor (MWV U 77)
  3. Adagio non troppo in E major (MWV U 104)
  4. Agitato e con fuoco in B minor (MWV U 98)
  5. Andante grazioso in D major (MWV U 97)
  6. Allegretto tranquillo in F♯ minor ("Venezianisches Gondellied" or Venetian Boat Song No. 2) (MWV U 110)
- Op. 31, Nicht unserm Namen, Herr for choir and orchestra (1830) (MWV A 9)
- Op. 32, Das Märchen von der schönen Melusine (The Beautiful Melusine), Overture in F major for orchestra (1833) (MWV P 12)
- Op. 33, 3 Caprices for piano (1833/35)
  1. Caprice in A minor (MWV U 99)
  2. Caprice in E major (MWV U 112)
  3. Caprice in B♭ minor (MWV U 95)
- Op. 34, 6 Songs for voice and piano (1834/36)
  1. "Minnelied: Leucht't heller als die Sonne" (MWV K 80)
  2. "Auf Flügeln des Gesanges" (MWV K 86)
  3. "Frühlingslied: Es brechen im schallenden Reigen" (MWV K 89)
  4. "Suleika: Ach, um deine feuchten Schwingen" (MWV K 92)
  5. "Sonntagslied: Ringsum erschallt in Wald und Flur" (MWV K 84)
  6. "Reiselied: Der Herbstwind rüttelt die Bäume" (MWV K 90)
- Op. 35, 6 Preludes and Fugues for piano (1827/37)
  1. Prelude and Fugue in E minor (MWV U 116, MWV U 66)
  2. Prelude and Fugue in D major (MWV U 129, MWV U 105)
  3. Prelude and Fugue in B minor (MWV U 131, MWV U 91)
  4. Prelude and Fugue in A♭ major (MWV U 122, MWV U 108)
  5. Prelude and Fugue in F minor (MWV U 126, MWV U 106)
  6. Prelude and Fugue in B♭ major (MWV U 135, MWV U 128)
- Op. 36, St. Paul (Oratorio) for choir and orchestra (1836) (MWV A 14)
- Op. 37, 3 Preludes and Fugues for organ (1837)
  1. Prelude and Fugue in C minor (MWV W 21, MWV W 18)
  2. Prelude and Fugue in G major (MWV W 22, MWV W 20)
  3. Prelude and Fugue in D minor (MWV W 23, MWV W 13)
- Op. 38, Songs Without Words for piano, Book III (1836/37)
  1. Con moto in E♭ major (MWV U 121)
  2. Allegro non troppo in C minor (MWV U 115)
  3. Presto e molto vivace in E major (MWV U 107)
  4. Andante in A major (MWV U 120)
  5. Agitato in A minor (MWV U 137)
  6. Andante con moto in A♭ major ("Duetto") (MWV U 119)
- Op. 39, 3 Motets for female choir and organ (1830)
  1. Veni, Domine (MWV B 24)
  2. Laudate pueri (MWV B 30)
  3. Surrexit pastor (MWV B 23)
- Op. 40, Piano Concerto No. 2 in D minor (1837) (MWV O 11)

==== Op. 41–60 ====
- Op. 41, 6 Lieder for mixed voices a cappella (1834/38)
  1. "Im Walde: Ihr Vögel in den Zweigen schwank" (MWV F 10)
  2. "Entflieh' mit mir: Entflieh' mit mir" (MWV F 4)
  3. "Es fiel ein Reif: Es fiel ein Reif" (MWV F 5)
  4. "Auf ihrem Grab: Auf ihrem Grab" (MWV F 6)
  5. "Mailied: Der Schnee zerrinnt" (MWV F 7)
  6. "Auf dem See: Und frische Nahrung" (MWV F 9)
- Op. 42, Psalm 42 for choir and orchestra (1837) (MWV A 15)
- Op. 43, Serenade and Allegro giocoso in B minor for piano and orchestra (1838) (MWV O 12)
- Op. 44, 3 String Quartets
  1. String Quartet No. 3 in D major (1838) (MWV R 30)
  2. String Quartet No. 4 in E minor (1837) (MWV R 26) (actually composed before Op. 44/1)
  3. String Quartet No. 5 in E♭ major (1838) (MWV R 28)
- Op. 45, Cello Sonata No. 1 in B♭ major (1838) (MWV Q 27)
- Op. 46, Psalm XCV ("Come, let us sing") for SST soloists, choir and orchestra (1838) (MWV A 16)
- Op. 47, 6 Songs for voice and piano (1839)
  1. "Minnelied: Wie der Quell so lieblich klinget" (MWV K 97)
  2. "Morgengruss: Über die Berge steigt schon die Sonne" (MWV K 100)
  3. "Frühlingslied: Durch den Wald, den dunklen, geht" (MWV K 101)
  4. "Volkslied: Es ist bestimmt in Gottes Rath" (MWV K 102)
  5. "Der Blumenstrauss: Sie wandelt im Blumengarten" (MWV K 73)
  6. "Bei der Wiege: Schlummre! Schlummre und träume von kommender Zeit" (MWV K 77)
- Op. 48, Der erste Frühlingstag [The first day of Spring] for mixed voices a cappella (1839)
  1. "Frühlingsahnung: O sanfter süsser Hauch" (MWV F 14)
  2. "Die Primel: Liebliche Blume" (MWV F 16)
  3. "Frühlingsfeier: Süsser, goldner Frühlingstag" (MWV F 18)
  4. "Lerchengesang: Wie lieblicher Klang" (MWV F 13)
  5. "Morgengebet: O wunderbares tiefes Schweigen" (MWV F 15)
  6. "Herbstlied: Holder Lenz, du bist dahin" (MWV F 17)
- Op. 49, Piano Trio No. 1 in D minor (1839) (MWV Q 29)
- Op. 50, 6 Lieder for four male voices a cappella (1837/40)
  1. "Türkisches Schenkenlied: Setze mir nicht, du Grobian" (MWV G 23)
  2. "Der Jäger Abschied: Wer hat dich, du schöner Wald" (MWV G 27)
  3. "Sommerlied: Wie Feld und Au' so blinkend im Thau" (MWV G 19)
  4. "Wasserfahrt: Am fernen Horizonte" (MWV G 17)
  5. "Liebe und Wein: Liebesschmerz. Was quälte dir dein armes Herz" (MWV G 26)
  6. "Wanderlied: Vom Grund bis zu den Gipfeln" (MWV G 28)
- Op. 51, Psalm CXIV ("When Israel out of Egypt came") for double choir and orchestra (1839) (MWV A 17)
- Op. Posth. 52, Lobgesang (Hymn of Praise), Symphony-Cantata on Words of the Holy Bible, for Soloists, Chorus and Orchestra (1840) (posthumously named Symphony No. 2 in B♭ major) (MWV A 18)
- Op. 53, Songs Without Words for piano, Book IV (1839/41)
  1. Andante con moto in A♭ major (MWV U 143)
  2. Allegro non troppo in E♭ major (MWV U 109)
  3. Presto agitato in G minor (MWV U 144)
  4. Adagio in F major (MWV U 114)
  5. Allegro con fuoco in A minor ("Volkslied") (MWV U 153)
  6. Molto Allegro vivace in A major (MWV U 154)
- Op. 54, Variations sérieuses for piano (1841) (MWV U 156)
- Op. 55, Antigone, incidental music for narrators, soloists, double male chorus and orchestra (1841) (MWV M 12)
- Op. 56, Symphony No. 3 in A minor ("Scottish") (1841/42) (MWV N 18) (actually the composer's last Symphony)
- Op. 57, 6 Lieder for voice and piano
  1. "Altdeutsches Lied: Es ist in den Wald gesungen" (MWV K 104)
  2. "Hirtenlied: O Winter, schlimmer Winter" (MWV K 103)
  3. "Suleika: Was bedeutet die Bewegung?" (MWV K 93)
  4. "O Jugend, o schöne Rosenzeit!: Von allen schönen Kindern auf der Welt" (MWV K 106)
  5. "Venetianisches Gondellied: Wenn durch die Piazetta" (MWV K 114)
  6. "Wanderlied: Laue Luft kommt blau geflossen" (MWV K 108)
- Op. 58, Cello Sonata No. 2 in D major (1843) (MWV Q 32)
- Op. 59, Im Grünen, Sechs Lieder for mixed voices a cappella (1837/43)
  1. "Im Grünen: Im Grün erwacht der frische Muth" (MWV F 8)
  2. "Frühzeitiger Frühling: Tage der Wonne, kommt ihr so bald" (MWV F 23)
  3. "Abschied vom Wald: O Thaler weit, o Höhen" (MWV F 20)
  4. "Die Nachtigall: Die Nachtigall, sie war entfernt" (MWV F 24)
  5. "Ruhetal: Wann im letzten Abendstrahl" (MWV F 21)
  6. "Jagdlied: Durch schwankende Wipfel" (MWV F 22)
- Op. 60, Die erste Walpurgisnacht, Cantata for soloists, choir and orchestra (1831/43) (MWV D 3)

==== Op. 61–72 ====
- Op. 61, A Midsummer Night's Dream, incidental music for soloists, female chorus and orchestra (1842) (MWV M 13)
  - – Scherzo
  - – Notturno
  - – Wedding March
- Op. 62, Songs Without Words for piano, Book V (1842/44)
  1. Andante espressivo in G major (MWV U 185)
  2. Allegro con fuoco in B♭ major (MWV U 181)
  3. Andante maestoso in E minor ("Trauermarsch") (MWV U 177)
  4. Allegro con anima in G major (MWV U 175)
  5. Andante con moto in A minor ("Venezianisches Gondellied" or Venetian Boat Song No. 3) (MWV U 151)
  6. Allegretto grazioso in A major ("Frühlingslied" or "Spring Song") (MWV U 161)
- Op. 63, 6 Lieder (Duets) for 2 voices and piano (1836/45)
  1. "Ich wollt' meine Lieb' ergösse sich: Ich wollt' meine Lieb' ergösse sich" (MWV J 5)
  2. "Abschied der Zugvögel: Wie war so schön doch Wald und Feld!" (MWV J 9)
  3. "Gruss: Wohin ich geh' und schaue" (MWV J 8)
  4. "Herbstlied: Ach, wie so bald verhallet der Reigen" (MWV J 11)
  5. "Volkslied: O sah' ich auf der Haide dort im Sturme dich" (MWV J 10)
  6. "Maiglöckchen und die Blümelein: Maiglöckchen läutet in dem Thal" (MWV J 7)
- Op. 64, Violin Concerto (No. 2) in E minor (1844) (MWV O 14)
- Op. 65, (6) Organ Sonatas (1844/45)
  1. Organ Sonata No. 1 in F minor (1844) (MWV W 56)
  2. Organ Sonata No. 2 in C minor (1844) (MWV W 57)
  3. Organ Sonata No. 3 in A major (1844) (MWV W 58)
  4. Organ Sonata No. 4 in B♭ major (1845) (MWV W 59)
  5. Organ Sonata No. 5 in D major (1844) (MWV W 60)
  6. Organ Sonata No. 6 in D minor (1845) (MWV W 61)
- Op. 66, Piano Trio No. 2 in C minor (1845) (MWV Q 33)
- Op. 67, (6) Songs Without Words for piano, Book VI (1843/45)
  1. Andante in E♭ major (MWV U 180)
  2. Allegro leggiero in F♯ minor (MWV U 145)
  3. Andante tranquillo in B♭ major (MWV U 102)
  4. Presto in C major ("Spinnerlied") (MWV U 182)
  5. Moderato in B minor (MWV U 184)
  6. Allegro non troppo in E major (MWV U 188)
- Op. 68, Festgesang an die Künstler: Der Menschheit Würde, Cantata for male chorus & brass (1846) (MWV D 6)
- Op. 69, 3 Motets for choir (1847)
  1. Nunc dimittis (MWV B 60)
  2. Jubilate (MWV B 58)
  3. Magnificat (MWV B 59)
- Op. 70, Elijah (Oratorio) for choir and orchestra (1846) (MWV A 25)
- Op. 71, 6 Lieder for voice and piano
  1. "Tröstung: Werde heiter, mein Gemüthe" (MWV K 120)
  2. "Frühlingslied: Der Frühling naht mit Brausen" (MWV K 119)
  3. "An die Entfernte: Diese Rose pflück' ich hier" (MWV K 126)
  4. "Schilflied: Auf dem Teich, dem regungslosen" (MWV K 116)
  5. "Auf der Wanderschaft: Ich wand're fort ins ferne Land" (MWV K 124)
  6. "Nachtlied: Vergangen ist der lichte Tag" (MWV K 125)
- Op. 72, (6) Kinderstücke [Children's pieces] for piano (1842)
  1. Allegro non troppo in G major (MWV U 171)
  2. Andante sostenuto in E♭ major (MWV U 170)
  3. Allegretto in G major (MWV U 164)
  4. Andante con moto in D major (MWV U 169)
  5. Allegro assai in G minor (MWV U 166)
  6. Vivace in F major (MWV U 168)

=== Works with opus number assigned posthumously ===
==== Op. Posth. 73–80 ====
- Op. Posth. 73, Lauda Sion, for soloists, choir and orchestra (1846) (MWV A 24)
  1. Lauda Sion salvatorem
  2. Laudis thema specialis
  3. Sit laus plena sit sonora
  4. In hac mensa novi regis
  5. Docti sacris institutis
  6. Caro cibus, sanguis potus
  7. Sumit unus, summunt mille
- Op. Posth. 74, Athalie, incidental music for narrators, soloists, double chorus and orchestra (1845) (MWV M 16)
- Op. Posth. 75, Wandersmann for TTBB chorus a cappella
  1. "Der frohe Wandersmann: Wem Gott will rechte Gunst" (Eichendorff) (MWV G 34)
  2. "Abendständchen: Schlafe, Liebchen, weil's auf Erden" (Eichendorff) (MWV G 24)
  3. "Trinklied: So lang man nüchtern ist" (Goethe) (MWV G 15)
  4. "Abschiedstafel: So ruckt denn in die Runde" (Eichendorff) (MWV G 33)
- Op. Posth. 76, 4 Lieder for four male voices (1844/46)
  1. "Das Lied vom braven Mann: Gaben mir Rath und gute Lehren" (MWV G 16)
  2. "Rheinweinlied: Wo solch' ein Feuer noch gedeiht" (MWV G 35)
  3. "Lied für die Deutschen in Lyon: Was uns eint als deutsche" (MWV G 36)
  4. "Comitat: Nun zu guter Letzt" (MWV G 38)
- Op. Posth. 77, 3 Lieder for voice and piano (1836/47)
  1. "Sonntagsmorgen: Das ist der Tag des Herrn" (MWV J 4)
  2. "Das Ährenfeld: Ein Leben war's im Ährenfeld" (MWV J 12)
  3. "Lied aus "Ruy Blas": Wozu der Vöglein Chöre belauschen fern und nah?" (MWV J 6)
- Op. Posth. 78, 3 Psalms for choir a cappella
  1. Psalm II ("Warum toben die Heiden" – "Why rage fiercely the heathen?") (1843) (MWV B 41)
  2. Psalm XLIII ("Richte mich, Gott und führe meine Sache" – "Judge me, O God") (1844) (MWV B 46)
  3. Psalm XXII ("Mein Gott, warum hast du mich verlassen" – "My God, my God!") (1844) (MWV B 51)
- Op. Posth. 79, 6 Anthems (Sechs Sprüche) for eight voices a cappella (1844/46)
  1. "Rejoice, O ye people" ("Frohlocket, ihr Völker auf Erden") (MWV B 42)
  2. "Thou, Lord, hast been our refuge" ("Herr Gott, du bist unsre Zuflucht") (MWV B 44)
  3. "Above all praise" ("Erhaben, o Herr, über alles Lob") (MWV B 55)
  4. "Lord, on our offences" ("Herr, gedenke nicht unsrer Übeltaten") (MWV B 50)
  5. "Let our hearts be joyful" ("Lasset uns frohlocken") (MWV B 54)
  6. "For our offences ("Um unsrer Sünden willen") (MWV B 52)
- Op. Posth. 80, String Quartet No. 6 in F minor (1847) (MWV R 37)

==== Op. Posth. 81–100 ====
- Op. Posth. 81, 4 Pieces for String Quartet (1843/47)
  1. Andante in E major (MWV R 34)
  2. Scherzo in A minor (MWV R 35)
  3. Capriccio in E minor (MWV R 32)
  4. Fugue in E♭ major (MWV R 23)
- Op. Posth. 82, Variations in E♭ major for piano (1841) (MWV U 158)
- Op. Posth. 83, Variations in B♭ major for piano (also for piano, four hands) (1841) (MWV U 159)
- Op. Posth. 84, 3 Lieder for bass voice and piano (1831/39)
  1. "Da lieg' ich unter den Bäumen: Da lieg' ich unter den Bäumen" (MWV K 69)
  2. "Herbstlied: Im Walde rauschen dürre Blätter" (MWV K 99)
  3. "Jagdlied: Mit Lust tät ich ausreiten" (MWV K 82)
- Op. Posth. 85, (6) Songs Without Words for piano, Book VII (1834/45)
  1. Andante espressivo in F major (MWV U 150)
  2. Allegro agitato in A minor (MWV U 101)
  3. Presto in E♭ major (MWV U 111)
  4. Andante sostenuto in D major (MWV U 190)
  5. Allegretto in A major (MWV U 191)
  6. Allegretto con moto in B♭ major (MWV U 155)
- Op. Posth. 86, 6 Songs for voice and piano (1826/47)
  1. "Es lauschte das Laub: Es lauschte das Laub so dunkelgrun" (MWV K 29)
  2. "Morgenlied: Erwacht in neuer Starke" (MWV K 123)
  3. "Die Liebende schreibt: Ein Blick von deinen Augen" (MWV K 66)
  4. "Allnächtlich im Traume seh' ich dich: Allnächtlich im Traume" (MWV K 78)
  5. "Der Mond: Mein Herz ist wie die dunkle Nacht" (MWV K 122)
  6. "Altdeutsches Frühlingslied: Der trübe Winter ist vorbei" (MWV K 127)
- Op. Posth. 87, String Quintet No. 2 in B♭ major (1845) (MWV R 33)
- Op. Posth. 88, 6 Lieder for four mixed voices a cappella (1839/44)
  1. "Neujahrslied: Mit der Freude zieht der Schmerz" (MWV F 28)
  2. "Der Glückliche: Ich hab' ein Liebchen" (MWV F 27)
  3. "Hirtenlied: O Winter, schlimmer Winter" (MWV F 12)
  4. "Die Waldvögelein: Kommt, lasst uns geh'n spazieren" (MWV F 25)
  5. "Deutschland: Durch tiefe Nacht ein Brausen zieht" (MWV F 33)
  6. "Der wandernde Musikant: Durch Feld und Buchenhallen" (MWV F 19)
- Op. Posth. 89, Die Heimkehr aus der Fremde (Singspiel) (1829) (MWV L 6)
- Op. Posth. 90, Symphony No. 4 in A major ("Italian") (1833) (MWV N 16) (actually the composer's 3rd Symphony)
- Op. Posth. 91, Psalm XCVIII ("Sing to the Lord a new song") for choir, orchestra, and organ (1843) (MWV A 23)
- Op. Posth. 92, Allegro brillant in A major for piano, four hands (1841) (MWV T 4)
- Op. Posth. 93, Oedipus at Colonos, incidental music for narrators, soloists, double male chorus and orchestra (1845) (MWV M 14)
- Op. Posth. 94, Infelice: Unglückselge! … Kehret wieder in B♭ major for soprano and orchestra (two versions: London, 1834 and Leipzig, 1842) (MWV H 4, MWV H 5)
- Op. Posth. 95, Ruy Blas, Overture in C minor for orchestra (1839) (MWV P 15)
- Op. Posth. 96, 3 Hymns for alto solo, choir and orchestra (1843) (MWV A 19) (From WoO 14)
- Op. Posth. 97, Christus (Oratorio) (unfinished) (1847) (MWV A 26)
- Op. Posth. 98, Loreley (opera) (unfinished) (1847) (MWV L 7)
- Op. Posth. 99, 6 Songs for voice and piano (1841/45)
  1. "Erster Verlust: Ach, wer bringt die schönen Tage" (MWV K 110)
  2. "Die Sterne schau'n in stiller Nacht: Die Sterne schau'n in stiller Nacht" (MWV K 19)
  3. "Lieblingsplätzchen: Wisst ihr, wo ich gerne weil'" (MWV K 61)
  4. "Das Schifflein: Ein Schifflein ziehet leise" (MWV K 109)
  5. "Wenn sich zwei Herzen scheiden: Wenn sich zwei Herzen scheiden" (MWV K 121)
  6. "Es weiss und rät es doch Keiner: Es weiss und rät es doch Keiner" (MWV K 112)
- Op. Posth. 100, 4 Lieder for four voices a cappella (1839/44)
  1. "Andenken: Die Bäume grünen überall" (MWV F 29)
  2. "Lob des Frühlings: Saatengrün, Veilchenduft" (MWV F 26)
  3. "Frühlingslied: Berg und Thal will ich durchstreifen" (MWV F 30)
  4. "Im Wald: O Wald, du kühlender Bronnen" (MWV F 11)

==== Op. Posth. 101–121 ====
- Op. Posth. 101, Trumpet Overture, Overture in C major for orchestra (1826) (MWV P 2)
- Op. Posth. 102, (6) Songs Without Words for piano, Book VIII (1842/45)
  1. Andante un poco agitato in E minor (MWV U 162)
  2. Adagio in D major (MWV U 192)
  3. Presto in C major ("Tarantelle") ("Kinderstuck") (MWV U 195)
  4. Un poco agitato, ma andante in G minor ("The Sighing Wind") (MWV U 152)
  5. Allegro vivace in A major ("The Joyous Peasant") ("Kinderstuck") (MWV U 194)
  6. Andante in C major ("Belief") (MWV U 172)
- Op. Posth. 103, Trauermarsch [Funeral March] in A minor for military orchestra (1836) (MWV P 14)
- Op. Posth. 104a, 3 Preludes for piano (1834)
  1. Prelude in B♭ major (MWV U 132)
  2. Prelude in B minor (MWV U 123)
  3. Prelude in D major (MWV U 127)
- Op. Posth. 104b, 3 Études for piano (1834/38)
  1. Étude in B♭ minor (MWV U 117)
  2. Étude in F major (MWV U 100)
  3. Étude in A minor (MWV U 142)
- Op. Posth. 105, Piano Sonata No. 2 in G minor (1821) (MWV U 30) (actually Mendelssohn's 1st Piano Sonata)
- Op. Posth. 106, Piano Sonata No. 3 in B♭ major (1827) (MWV U 64)
- Op. Posth. 107, Symphony No. 5 in D major/minor ("Reformation") (1830) (MWV N 15) (actually the composer's 2nd Symphony)
- Op. Posth. 108, March in D major for orchestra (1841) (MWV P 16)
- Op. Posth. 109, Song without words in D major for cello and piano (1845) (MWV Q 34)
- Op. Posth. 110, Piano Sextet in D major (1824) (MWV Q 16)
- Op. Posth. 111, Tu es Petrus in A major for five voices and orchestra (1827) (MWV A 4)
- Op. Posth. 112, 2 Sacred songs for voice and piano (1835)
  1. "Doch der Herr, er leitet die Irrenden recht"
  2. "Der du die Menschen lassest sterben"
- Op. Posth. 113, Concert Piece No. 1 in F minor for clarinet, basset-horn, and piano (1833) (MWV Q 23)
- Op. Posth. 114, Concert Piece No. 2 in D minor for clarinet, basset-horn, and piano (1833) (MWV Q 24)
- Op. Posth. 115, 2 Sacred choruses for male choir a cappella (1833)
  1. "Beati mortui: Beati mortui in Domino" (MWV B 28)
  2. "Periti autem: Periti autem fulgebunt" (MWV B 29)
- Op. Posth. 116, Trauer-Gesang: Sahst du ihn herniederschweben in der Morgen [Funeral Song] in G minor for mixed choir a cappella (1845) (MWV F 31)
- Op. Posth. 117, Albumblatt (Album-leaf) in E minor ("Lied ohne Worte") for piano (1837) (MWV U 134)
- Op. Posth. 118, Capriccio in E major for piano (1837) (MWV U 139)
- Op. Posth. 119, Perpetuum mobile in C major for piano (MWV U 58)
- Op. Posth. 120, 4 Lieder for four male voices a cappella (1822–47)
  1. "Jagdlied: Auf, ihr Herrn und Damen schön" (MWV G 21)
  2. "Morgengruss des Thüringischen Sangerbundes: Seid gegrüsset, traute Bruder" (MWV G 37)
  3. "Im Süden: Süsse Dufte, milde Lüfte" (MWV G 20)
  4. "Zigeunerlied: Im Nebelgeriesel, im tiefen Schnee" (MWV G 5)
- Op. Posth. 121, Adspice Domine de sede for male choir and cello (1833) (MWV B 26)
  1. Adspice Domine de sede
  2. Asperi oculos tuos
  3. Qui regis Israel
  4. Asperi oculos tuos
  5. O lux beata

=== Works with WoO numbers ===
==== WoO 1 – 10 ====
- WoO 1, Etude in F minor for piano (1826) (MWV U 125)
- WoO 2, Scherzo in B minor for piano (1829) (MWV U 69)
- WoO 3, Scherzo a capriccio in F♯ minor for piano (1835/36) (MWV U 113)
- WoO 4, 2 Romances, voice and piano (1833/34)
  1. There be none of beauty's daughters, 1833 (MWV K 76)
  2. Sun of the sleepless, 1834 (MWV K 85)
- WoO 5, Verleih uns Frieden for choir, and orchestra or organ (1831) (MWV A 11)
- WoO 6, Andante cantabile e Presto agitato in B major for piano (1838) (MWV U 141)
- WoO 7, The Garland (Der Blumenkranz), lied (1829) (MWV K 44)
- WoO 8, Ersatz für Unbestand for 4 male voices (1839) (MWV G 25)
- WoO 9, Festgesang zum Gutenbergfest, for male chorus & brass (1840) (MWV D 4)
- WoO 10, Gondellied for piano (1837) (MWV U 136)

==== WoO 11 – 20 ====
- WoO 11, 3 Folk Songs (1836)
  1. Wie kann ich froh und lustig sein? (MWV J 1)
  2. Abendlied (MWV J 2)
  3. Wasserfahrt (MWV J 3)
- WoO 12, Lord, have mercy upon us for choir a capella (1833) (MWV B 27)
- WoO 13, Präludium und Fuge for piano ("Notre Temps") (1827/41) (MWV U 157, MWV U 65)
- WoO 14, 3 Sacred Songs (1840) (MWV B 33) (Later developed into Op. Posth. 96)
  1. Lass', o Herr, mich Hülfe finden
  2. Choral. Deines Kind's Gebet erhöre
  3. Herr, wir trau'n auf deine Güte
- WoO 15, Hymn Hör mein Bitten / Hear My Prayer (1844) (MWV B 49)
- WoO 16, Song Warnung vor dem Rhein (MWV K 105) (1840)
- WoO 17, 2 Songs (1835)
  1. Das Waldschloss (MWV K 87)
  2. Pagenlied (MWV K 75)
- WoO 18, 2 Songs (1834/41)
  1. Ich hör' ein Vöglein (A. Böttger, 1841) (MWV K 107)
  2. Todeslied der Bojaren (C. Immermann, 1834) (MWV K 68)
- WoO 19, Andante cantabile e Presto agitato in B♭ major/G minor for piano (MWV U 93, MWV U 94)
- WoO 20, Seemanns Scheidelied, lied (1831) (MWV K 48)

==== WoO 21 – 29 ====
- WoO 21, Nachtgesang, for four male voices (1840) (MWV G 29)
- WoO 22, Die Stiftungsfeier, for four male voices (1842) (MWV G 32)
- WoO 23, Des Mädchens Klage, song (MWV K 25)
- WoO 24, Kyrie eleison (1846) (MWV B 57/1)
- WoO 25, Duo concertant, variations on Carl Maria von Weber's march 'La preciosa' for two pianos (1833) (MWV O 9)
- WoO 26, Ehre sei Gott in der Höhe (1846)
- WoO 27, Heilig for choir (1846) (MWV B 47 same as MWV B 57/2)
- WoO 28, Psalm 100 Jauchzet dem Herrn, alle Welt for choir (1844) (MWV B 45)
- WoO 29, Te Deum in A (1832) (MWV B 25)

=== Works without opus or WoO number ===
- Recitative for Piano and Strings in G minor (1820) (MWV O 1)
- Trio for Piano, Violin and Viola in C minor (1820) (MWV Q 3)
- Violin Sonata (No. 1) in F major (1820) (MWV Q 7)
- Die Soldatenliebschaft, singspiel, (1820) (MWV L 1)
- 19 miscellaneous pieces (plus several fragments) for organ (1820/45)
- Sinfonia for Strings No. 1 in C major (1821) (MWV N 1)
- Sinfonia for Strings No. 2 in D major (1821) (MWV N 2)
- Sinfonia for Strings No. 3 in E minor (1821) (MWV N 3)
- Sinfonia for Strings No. 4 in C minor (1821) (MWV N 4)
- Sinfonia for Strings No. 5 in B♭ major (1821) (MWV N 5)
- Sinfonia for Strings No. 6 in E♭ major (1821) (MWV N 6)
- Piano Quartet in D minor (1821) (MWV Q 10)
- 17 Fugues for String Quartet (1821) (MWV R 1-MWV R 17, some incomplete)
- Die beiden Pädagogen, singspiel, (1821) (MWV L 2)
- Gloria for choir and orchestra (1822) (MWV A 1)
- Magnificat for choir and orchestra (1822) (MWV A 2)
- Sinfonia for Strings No. 7 in D minor: I. Allegro, II. Andante amorevole, III. Menuetto, IV. Allegro molto (1822) (MWV N 7)
- Sinfonia for Strings No. 8 in D major: I. Adagio e Grave - Allegro, II. Adagio, III. Menuetto. (Presto), IV. Allegro molto (1822) (MWV N 8) (later arranged for full orchestra)
- Concerto for Piano and Strings in A minor (1822) (MWV O 2)
- Concerto (No. 1) for Violin and Strings in D minor (1823) (MWV O 3)
- Die wandernden Komödianten, singspiel, (1822) (MWV L 3)
- Sinfonia for Strings No. 9 in C major: I. Grave - Allegro, II. Andante, III. Scherzo, IV. Allegro vivace (1823) (MWV N 9)
- Sinfonia for Strings No. 10 in B minor: Adagio - Allegro - Più Presto (1823) (MWV N 10)
- Sinfonia for Strings No. 11 in F major: I. Adagio - Allegro molto, II. 'Schweizerlied'. Scherzo comodo, III. Adagio, IV. Menuetto. Allegro moderato, V. Allegro molto (1823) (MWV N 11)
- Sinfonia for Strings No. 12 in G minor: I.Fuga. (Grave) - Allegro, II. Andante, III. Allegro molto (1823) (MWV N 12)
- "Symphoniesatz" (Sinfonia for Strings No. 13) movement in C minor: Grave - Allegro molto (1823) (MWV N 14)
- Concerto for Violin, Piano, and Strings in D minor (1823) (MWV O 4)
- Concerto for 2 Pianos and Orchestra (No. 1) in E major (1823) (MWV O 5)
- String Quartet in E♭ major (1823) (MWV R 18)
- Der Onkel aus Boston, oder Die beiden Neffen, singspiel, (1823) (MWV L 4)
- Kyrie in C minor for SSAATTBB and soloists a cappella (1823) (MWV B 12)
- Viola Sonata in C minor (1823/24) (MWV Q 14)
- Concerto for 2 Pianos and Orchestra (No. 2) in A♭ major (1824) (MWV O 6)
- Clarinet Sonata in E♭ major (1824) (MWV Q 15)
- Kyrie in D minor for choir and orchestra (1825) (MWV A 3)
- Te Deum in D for SSAATTBB & bc. (1826) (MWV B 15)
- The Evening Bell in B♭ for harp and piano (1829) (MWV Q 20)
- The Shepherd's Song in G minor for solo flute (MWV R 24)
- Assai tranquillo in B minor, for cello and piano (1835) (MWV Q 25)
- Violin Sonata (No. 3) in F major (1838) (MWV Q 26) (ed./publ. by Yehudi Menuhin, 1953)
- Lord, hear the voice (Psalm 5) (1839) (MWV B 31), SATB
- Defend Me, Lord (Psalm 31) (1839) (MWV B 32), SATB

==== Lost works ====
- 3 Kindersymphonien (two performed in Berlin, Christmas Eve 1827 and 1828, and one of unknown dating, which are now lost)

== Listed by genre ==
=== Secular vocal/choral (each category in order of work completion) ===
==== Operas ====
Completion	Title	Genre	Length	Première	Libretto
1820	Soldatenliebschaft (MWV L 1)	Singspiel	1 act	11 December 1820, private performance, Berlin	Johann Ludwig Casper, after an unknown librettist
1821	Die beiden Pädagogen (MWV L 2)	Singspiel	1 act	15 March 1821, private performance, Berlin	Johann Ludwig Casper, after Eugène Scribe
1822	Die wandernden Komödianten (MWV L 3)	Singspiel	1 act	8 March 1822, private performance, Berlin	Johann Ludwig Casper, after Louis-Benoît Picard
1823	Der Onkel aus Boston, oder Die beiden Neffen (MWV L 4)	Singspiel	3 acts	7 February 1824, private performance, Berlin	Johann Ludwig Casper, after an unknown librettist
1825	Die Hochzeit des Camacho, Op. 10	Singspiel	2 acts	29 April 1827, Schauspielhaus, Berlin	Friedrich Voigts after Ludwig Tieck's translation of Miguel de Cervantes
1829	Die Heimkehr aus der Fremde, Op. Posth. 89	Liederspiel	1 act	26 December 1829, private performance, Berlin, 10 April 1851, Leipzig	Karl Klingemann
1847	Die Lorelei, Op. Posth. 98		only a fragment: finale of Act 1 and Vintners' Chorus	8 September 1852, Town Hall, Birmingham	Emanuel Geibel

==== Incidental music ====
- Antigone, Op. 55 (1841), narrators, soloists, double male chorus and orchestra
- A Midsummer Night's Dream, Op. 61 (1843), soloists, female chorus and orchestra
- Athalie, Op. Posth. 74 (1845), narrators, soloists, double chorus and orchestra
- Oedipus at Colonus, Op. 93 (1845), soloists, chorus, and orchestra

==== Lieder & Songs ====
- Des Mädchens Klage, song for voice and piano (1825) (WoO 23) (MWV K 25)
- Twelve Songs for voice and piano, Op. 8 (1824–27) (3 of the songs were composed by Fanny Mendelssohn, but published under Felix's name)
- The Garland (Der Blumenkranz), lied for voice and piano (1829) (WoO 7) (MWV K 44)
- Twelve Lieder for voice and piano, Op. 9 (1827–30) (3 of the lieder were composed by Fanny Mendelssohn, but published under Felix's name)
- Seemanns Scheidelied, lied for voice and piano (1831) (WoO 20) (MWV K 48)
- Six Songs for voice and piano, Op. 19a (1830–32)
- Two Romances for voice and piano (1833–34) (WoO 4)
  1. There be none of beauty's daughters, 1833 (MWV K 76)
  2. Sun of the sleepless, 1834 (MWV K 85)
- Two Songs for voice and piano (1832–1835) (WoO 17)
  1. Das Waldschloss (MWV K 87)
  2. Pagenlied (MWV K 75)
- Three Folk Songs for 2 voices and piano (1836) (WoO 11)
  1. Wie kann ich froh und lustig sein? (MWV J 1)
  2. Abendlied (MWV J 2)
  3. Wasserfahrt (MWV J 3)
- Six Songs for voice and piano, Op. 34 (1834–37) (No. 2: "On Wings of Song")
- Six Lieder for four mixed voices or SATB chorus a cappella, Op. 41 (1834–38)
- Three Lieder for bass voice and piano, Op. Posth. 84 (1831–39)
- Six Songs for voice and piano, Op. 47 (1832–39)
- Ersatz für Unbestand, TTBB chorus a cappella (1839) (WoO 8) (MWV G 25)
- Der erste Frühlingstag for four mixed voices or SATB chorus a cappella, Op. 48 (1839)
- Six Lieder for TTBB a cappella (+optional brass), Op. 50 (1837–40)
- Warnung vor dem Rhein for voice and piano (1840) (WoO 16) (MWV K 105)
- Nachtgesang for TTBB chorus a cappella (1840) (WoO 21) (MWV G 29)
- Two Songs for voice and piano (1831–41) (WoO 18)
  1. Ich hör' ein Vöglein (A. Böttger, 1841) (MWV K 107)
  2. Todeslied der Bojaren (C. Immermann, 1831) (MWV K 68)
- Six Lieder for voice and piano, Op. 57 (1837–42)
- Die Stiftungsfeier for TTBB chorus (1842) (WoO 22) (MWV G 32)
- Im Grünen: Six lieder for SATB chorus a cappella, Op. 59 (1837–43)
- Six Lieder (Duets) for 2 voices and piano, Op. 63 (1836–44)
- Wandersmann: Four lieder for TTBB chorus a cappella, Op. Posth. 75 (1837–1844)
- Four Lieder for SATB chorus a cappella, Op. Posth. 100 (1839–44)
- Six Songs for voice and piano, Op. Posth. 99 (1824–45)
- Four Lieder for TTBB chorus a cappella, Op. Posth. 120 (ca.1822-1847)
- Six Songs for voice and piano, Op. Posth. 86 (1826–47)
- Three Lieder for voice and piano, Op. Posth. 77 (1836–47)
- Four Lieder for TTBB, Op. Posth. 76 (1837–47)
- Six Lieder for four mixed voices or SATB chorus a cappella, Op. Posth. 88 (1839–47)
- Six Lieder for voice and piano, Op. 71 (1842–47)

==== Secular cantatas ====
- Die erste Walpurgisnacht, Op. 60 (1831/43), soloists, choir and orchestra
- Festgesang an die Künstler: Der Menschheit Würde, Op. 68 (1846), male chorus & brass

=== Sacred vocal/choral (each category in order of work completion) ===
==== Oratorios ====
- St. Paul (Paulus), Op. 36 (1836)
- Elijah (Elias), Op. 70 (1846)
- Christus, Op. Posth. 97 (unfinished) (1847)

==== Chorale cantatas ====
Mendelssohn composed several chorale cantatas, several on Lutheran hymns:

- Christe du Lamm Gottes (MWV A 5), (1827), SATB, strings, on the German Agnus Dei
- Cantata on "Jesu, meine Freude" (MWV A 6), (1828), SATB, strings
- Wer nur den lieben Gott läßt walten on "Wer nur den lieben Gott läßt walten" (MWV A 7), (1829), S solo, SATB, strings
- Cantata on "O Haupt voll Blut und Wunden" (MWV A 8), (1830), baritone, SATB, orch.
- Vom Himmel hoch, Christmas cantata on "Vom Himmel hoch, da komm ich her" (MWV A 10), (1831), SB soloists, SATB, orchestra
- Verleih uns Frieden (MWV A 11), (1831) SATB, orchestra/organ
- Wir glauben all an einen Gott (MWV A 12), (1831), SATB, orch., on Luther's "Wir glauben all an einen Gott"
- Cantata on "Ach Gott, vom Himmel sieh darein" (MWV A 13), (1832), baritone, SATB, strings

==== Psalm settings ====
- Gott du bist unsre Zuversicht (Psalm 46), (1821) (MWV B 5) SSATB a cappella
- Die Himmel erzählen (Psalm 19), (1821) (MWV B 6) SSATB
- Ich weiche nicht (Psalm 119:102), (1821/22) (MWV B 1) SATB
- Deine Rede präge ich in meinem Herzen (Psalm 119:11), (1821/22) (MWV B 2) SATB
- Jauchzet Gott alle Lande (Psalm 66), (1822) (MWV B 9) SSA soli, SSASSA, bc
- Nicht unserm Namen, Herr (Psalm 115), Op. 31 (1835), S solo, SATB, orch.
- Wie der Hirsch schreit nach frischem Wasser (Psalm 42), Op. 42 (1838), Solo: STTBB, Choir: SATB, Orchestra (partially reused in Richte mich Gott)
- Lord, hear the voice of my complaint (Psalm 5) (1839) (MWV B 31), SATB
- Defend Me, Lord (Psalm 31) (1839) (MWV B 32), SATB
- Da Israel aus Aegypten zog (Psalm 114), Op. 51 (1841), SSAATTBB, orch.
- Kommt, laßt uns anbeten und knien von dem Herrn (Psalm 95), Op. 46 (1842), SST soli, choir and orch.
- Singet dem Herrn ein neues Lied (Psalm 98), Op. Posth. 91 (1843), SATBSATB, orch.
- Jauchzet dem Herrn, alle Welt (Psalm 100), WoO 28 (1844), SATB
- Hymn Hör mein Bitten / Hear My Prayer (paraphrase of Psalm 55), WoO 15 (1844), S solo, SATB, organ
- Denn er hat seinen Engeln befohlen (Psalm 91), (1844) (MWV B 53) SSAATTBB (reused in Elijah)
- Three Psalms, Op. Posth. 78 (1843–45), SSAATTBB
  - Warum toben die Heiden (Psalm 2)
  - Richte mich Gott (Psalm 43)
  - Mein Gott, warum hast du mich verlassen (Psalm 22)

==== Other accompanied sacred vocal/choral ====
- Gloria for choir and orchestra (1822) (MWV A 1)
- Magnificat for choir and orchestra (1822) (MWV A 2)
- Kyrie in D minor for choir and orchestra (1825) (MWV A 3)
- Te Deum in D for SSAATTBB & bc. (1826) (MWV B 15)
- Tu es Petrus in A major for SSATB and orchestra, Op. Posth. 111 (1827) (MWV A 4)
- Kirchenmusik, 3 Sacred pieces for soloists, choir, and organ/ensemble, Op. 23 (1830)
  1. Aus tiefer Not schrei' ich zu dir (MWV B 20)
  2. Ave Maria (MWV B 19)
  3. Mitten wir im Leben sind mit dem Tod umfangen (MWV B 21)
- Te Deum in A, WoO 29 (1832) (MWV B 25), SATB and organ
- Adspice Domine de sede (Vespergesang) for male choir and cello, Op. Posth. 121 (1833) (MWV B 26)
  - Adspice Domine de sede
  - Asperi oculos tuos
  - Qui regis Israel
  - Asperi oculos tuos
  - O lux beata
- Two Sacred songs for solo voice and piano, Op. Posth. 112 (1835)
  1. Doch Der Herr, er leitet
  2. Der du die Menschen lässest sterben
- 3 Motets for female choir and organ, Op. 39 (1830/1837)
  1. Veni, Domine (Herr, erhöre uns) (MWV B 24)
  2. Laudate pueri (Ihr Kinder Israel) (MWV B 30)
  3. Surrexit pastor (Er ist ein guter Hirte) (MWV B 23)
- Lobgesang, Op. Posth. 52 (Symphony No. 2 in B♭ major) (1840), symphony-cantata for soloists, choir, organ and orchestra
- Festgesang - Gutenberg Cantata, WoO 9 (1840) (MWV D 4) male chorus & brass
- 3 Sacred Songs WoO 14 (1840) for alto solo, choir and organ (Later developed into Op. Posth. 96)
  1. Lass', o Herr, mich Hülfe finden
  2. Deines Kind's Gebet erhöre
  3. Herr, wir trau'n auf deine Güte
- 3 Hymns and Fugue Op. Posth. 96 (From WoO 14), (1843), for alto solo, choir and orchestra
  1. Lass', o Herr, mich Hülfe finden
  2. Deines Kind's Gebet erhöre
  3. Herr, wir trau'n auf deine Güte
  - Fugue Lasst sein heilig Lob uns singen
- Lauda Sion Op. Posth. 73 (1846), for soloists, SATB choir and orchestra

==== Other unaccompanied sacred vocal/choral ====
- Kyrie in C minor for SSAATTBB and soloists a cappella (1823) (MWV B 12)
- 2 Sacred choruses for male choir a cappella, Op. Posth. 115 (1833)
  1. Beati mortui in Domino (MWV B 28)
  2. Periti autem fulgebunt (MWV B 29)
- Lord, have mercy upon us (Herr, sei gnädig) motet for choir a capella, WoO 12 (1833)
- Six Anthems (Sechs Sprüche), Op. Posth. 79 (1843–6), SSAATTBB
  - Frohlocket, ihr Völker auf Erden – Weihnachten (Christmas)
  - Herr Gott, du bist unsre Zuflucht – Am Neujahrstage (New Year)
  - Erhaben, o Herr, über alles Lob – Am Himmelsfahrtstage (Ascension)
  - Herr, gedenke nicht unsrer Übelthaten – In der Passionszeit (Passiontide)
  - Lasset uns frohlocken – Im Advent (Advent)
  - Um unsrer Sünden – Am Karfreitag (Good Friday)
- Die Deutsche Liturgie (1846), (MWV B 57) SSAATTBB
  - Amen
  - Ehre sei dem Vater (doxology)
  - Kyrie (WoO 24)
  - Ehre sei Gott in der Höhe (Gloria) (WoO 26)
  - Und mit deinem Geiste
  - Amen (after collection)
  - Alleluja (Hallelujah)
  - Amen (after the Gospel reading)
  - Amen (after the profession of faith)
  - Heilig (Sanctus) (WoO 27)
- 3 Motets (English Church Pieces) for SATB choir, Op. 69 (1847) (Movement 2 sets Psalm 100, but this sub-category seems more appropriate than the 'Psalm settings' list above)
  1. Herr, nun lässest du / Lord now lettest thou (Nunc dimittis) (MWV B 60)
  2. Jauchzet / O be joyful (Jubilate) (Psalm 100) (MWV B 58)
  3. Mein Herz erhebet / My soul doth magnify (Magnificat) (MWV B 59)

=== Instrumental ===
==== Symphonies ====
- 13 String Symphonies
  - String Symphony No. 1 in C major (1821)
  - String Symphony No. 2 in D major (1821)
  - String Symphony No. 3 in E minor (1821)
  - String Symphony No. 4 in C minor (1821)
  - String Symphony No. 5 in B♭ major (1821)
  - String Symphony No. 6 in E♭ major (1821)
  - String Symphony No. 7 in D minor (1822)
  - String Symphony No. 8 in D major (later arranged for full orchestra) (1822)
  - String Symphony No. 9 in C minor (1823)
  - String Symphony No. 10 in B minor (1823)
  - String Symphony No. 11 in F major (1823)
  - String Symphony No. 12 in G minor (1823)
  - String Symphony No. 13 in C minor "Symphoniesatz" (single movement) (1823)
- Symphony No. 1 in C minor, Op. 11 (1824)
- Lobgesang, Op. Posth. 52 (Symphony No. 2 in B♭ major) (1840), symphony-cantata for soloists, choir, organ and orchestra
- Symphony No. 3 in A minor, Op. 56 "Scottish" (1842)
- Symphony No. 4 in A major, Op. Posth. 90 "Italian" (1833)
- Symphony No. 5 in D major/minor, Op. Posth. 107 "Reformation" (1832)

==== Concertos and concertante works ====
- Piano Concerto (No. 0) in A minor, for piano and strings (1822)
- Piano Concerto No. 1 in G minor, Op. 25 (1831)
- Piano Concerto No. 2 in D minor, Op. 40 (1837)
- Piano Concerto No. 3 (fragment) in E minor, Op. Posth. (1844)
- Violin Concerto (No. 1) in D minor, for violin and strings (1822)
- Violin Concerto (No. 2) in E minor, Op. 64 (1844)
- Recitative in G minor, for piano and strings (1820)
- Capriccio brillant for Piano and Orchestra in B minor, Op. 22 (1826, published 1832)
- Rondo brillant for Piano and Orchestra in E♭ major, Op. 29 (1834)
- Serenade and Allegro giocoso for Piano and Orchestra in B minor, Op. 43 (1838)
- Double Concerto for Violin, Piano and String Orchestra in D minor (1823)
- Concerto for 2 Pianos and Orchestra (No. 1) in E major (1823)
- Concerto for 2 Pianos and Orchestra (No. 2) in A♭ major (1824)

==== Overtures and other orchestral works ====
- A Midsummer Night's Dream, Overture in E major for orchestra, op. 21 (1827)
- Overture in C major for wind instruments, op. 24 (1824)
- The Hebrides or Fingal's Cave, Overture in B minor for orchestra, op. 26 (1832)
- Meeresstille und glückliche Fahrt (Calm Sea and Prosperous Voyage), Overture in D major for orchestra, op. 27 (1828)
- Das Märchen von der schönen Melusine (The Beautiful Melusine), Overture in F major for orchestra, op. 32 (1834)
- Ruy Blas, Overture in C minor for orchestra, op. posth. 95 (1839)
- Trumpet Overture, Overture in C major for orchestra, op. posth. 101 (1826)
- Funeral March in A minor, op. posth. 103 (1836)
- March in D major, op. posth. 108 (1841)
- Kindersinfonie MWV P 4 (1827) (lost)
- Kindersinfonie MWV P 6 (1828) (lost)
- Kindersinfonie MWV P 8 (lost)

==== Chamber music ====
- Violin Sonata (No. 1) in F major (1820)
- Piano Trio (No. 0) in C minor (1820)
- 12 Fugues for String Quartet (1821)
- Piano Quartet (No. 0) in D minor (1821)
- Piano Quartet No. 1 in C minor, Op. 1
- String Quartet (No. 0) in E♭ major (1823)
- Piano Quartet No. 2 in F minor, Op. 2
- Piano Quartet No. 3 in B minor, Op. 3
- Viola Sonata in C minor (1824)
- Clarinet Sonata in E♭ major (1824)
- Violin Sonata (No. 2) in F minor, Op. 4
- String Quartet No. 1 in E♭ major, Op. 12
- String Quartet No. 2 in A minor, Op. 13
- Variations concertantes in D major for cello and piano, Op. 17
- String Quintet No. 1 in A major, Op. 18
- String Octet in E♭ major, Op. 20 (1825)
- The Evening Bell in B♭ major for harp and piano (1829)
- The Shepherd's Song in G minor for solo flute
- Assai tranquillo in B minor, for cello and piano (1835)
- String Quartet No. 3 in D major, Op. 44/1
- String Quartet No. 4 in E minor, Op. 44/2
- String Quartet No. 5 in E♭ major, Op. 44/3
- Violin Sonata (No. 3) in F major (1838)
- Cello Sonata No. 1 in B♭ major, Op. 45
- Piano Trio No. 1 in D minor, Op. 49
- Cello Sonata No. 2 in D major, Op. 58
- Piano Trio No. 2 in C minor, Op. 66
- String Quartet No. 6 in F minor, Op. Posth. 80
- Four pieces for string quartet, Op. Posth. 81
- String Quintet No. 2 in B♭ major, Op. Posth. 87
- Lied ohne Worte (Song without Words) in D major for cello and piano, Op. Posth. 109 (1845)
- Piano Sextet in D major, Op. Posth. 110
- Concert Piece No. 1 in F minor for clarinet, basset-horn, and piano, Op. Posth. 113
- Concert Piece No. 2 in D minor for clarinet, basset-horn, and piano, Op. Posth. 114

==== Piano ====
- List of solo piano compositions by Felix Mendelssohn

==== Organ ====
- 6 Organ Sonatas, Op. 65 (1844/45)
- 3 Preludes and Fugues for organ, Op. 37 (1837)

== See also ==
- Mendelssohn-Werkverzeichnis (MWV), the first modern fully researched music catalogue of the works of Felix Mendelssohn
