= String Quartet in E-flat major =

String Quartet in E-flat major may refer to:

- No. 1 of the String Quartets, Op. 20 (Haydn)
- No. 2 of the String Quartets, Op. 33 (Haydn)
- No. 3 of the String Quartets, Op. 50 (Haydn)
- No. 6 of the String Quartets, Op. 64 (Haydn)
- No. 6 of the String Quartets, Op. 76 (Haydn)
- String Quartet in E-flat major (Wanhal)
- String Quartet No. 7 (Mozart)
- String Quartet No. 11 (Mozart)
- String Quartet No. 16 (Mozart)
- String Quartet No. 10 (Beethoven)
- String Quartet No. 12 (Beethoven)
- String Quartet No. 10 (Schubert)
- String Quartet in E-flat major (1823) (Mendelssohn)
- String Quartet No. 1 (Mendelssohn)
- String Quartet No. 5 (Mendelssohn)
- String Quartet No. 10 (Dvořák)
- String Quartet (Manrique de Lara)
- String Quartet in E-flat major (Sibelius)
- String Quartet No. 3 (Nielsen)
- String Quartet No. 5 (Hill)
- String Quartet No. 1 (Enescu)
- String Quartet No. 9 (Shostakovich)
- Quartet Movement in E-flat major (Shostakovich)
