= Op. 44 =

In music, Op. 44 stands for Opus number 44. Compositions that are assigned this number include:

- Beethoven – Variations on an original theme in E-flat major
- Britten – Spring Symphony
- Bruch – Violin Concerto No. 2
- Busoni – Indian Fantasy
- Chopin – Polonaise in F-sharp minor, Op. 44
- Danzi – Horn Sonata No. 2
- Dvořák – Serenade for Wind Instruments
- Elgar – Coronation Ode
- Ginastera – Popol Vuh
- Goehr – Behold the Sun
- Górecki – Miserere
- Mendelssohn – String Quartet No. 3
- Mendelssohn – String Quartet No. 4
- Mendelssohn – String Quartet No. 5
- Nielsen – String Quartet No. 4
- Oswald – Cello Sonata No. 2
- Prokofiev – Symphony No. 3
- Rachmaninoff – Symphony No. 3
- Saint-Saëns – Piano Concerto No. 4
- Schumann – Piano Quintet
- Sibelius – Valse triste, concert piece for orchestra from the theatre score Kuolema (1903, revised 1904)
- Strauss – Notturno
- Tchaikovsky – Piano Concerto No. 2
