= Violin Sonata in F major =

Violin Sonata in F major may refer to:

- Violin Sonata No. 5 (Beethoven)
- Violin Sonata (Dvořák)
- Violin Sonata No. 1 (Grieg)
- Violin sonata in F major (HWV 370), by George Frideric Handel
- Violin Sonata in F major (Mendelssohn, 1820)
- Violin Sonata in F major (Mendelssohn, 1838)
- Violin Sonata No. 36 (Mozart)
