= Op. 68 =

In music, Op. 68 stands for Opus number 68. Compositions that are assigned this number include:

- Arnold – Sweeney Todd
- Beethoven – Symphony No. 6
- Brahms – Symphony No. 1
- Britten – Cello Symphony
- Chopin – Mazurkas, Op. 68
- Dvořák – Silent Woods
- Elgar – Falstaff
- Fučík – Entrance of the Gladiators
- Mendelssohn – Festgesang an die Künstler
- Sallinen – Palatsi
- Schumann – Album for the Young
- Scriabin – Piano Sonata No. 9
- Shostakovich – String Quartet No. 2
- Sibelius – Two Rondinos, for solo piano (1912)
- Spohr – String Quartet No. 19
- Strauss – Sechs Lieder, Op. 68
