= Piano Quartet No. 3 =

Piano Quartet No. 3 may refer to:

- Piano Quartet No. 3 (Beethoven)
- Piano Quartet No. 3 (Brahms)
- Piano Quartet No. 3 (Mendelssohn)
