= List of solo piano compositions by Felix Mendelssohn =

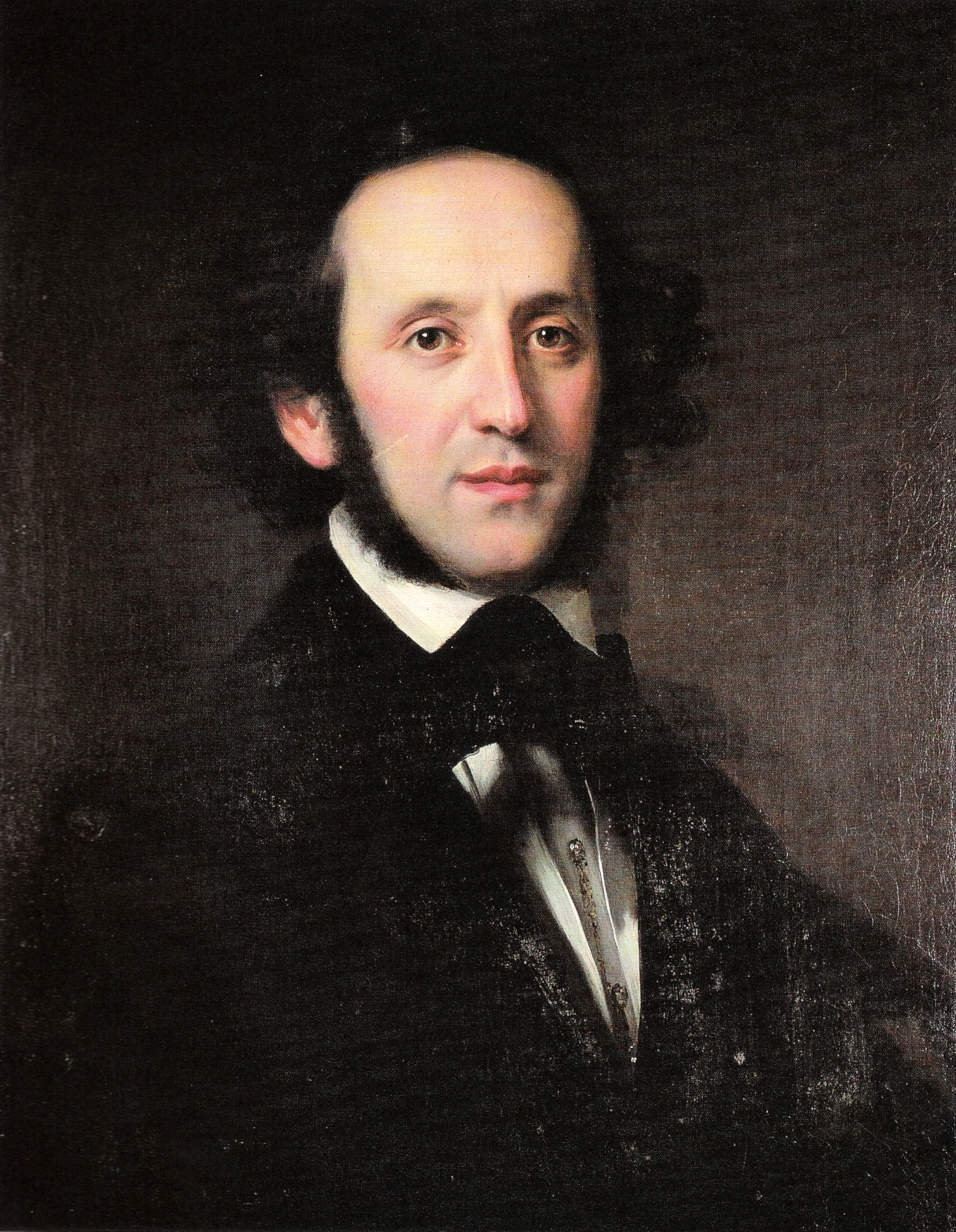
Felix Mendelssohn

This is a list of solo piano pieces by Felix Mendelssohn.

== Pieces ==
=== Sonatas ===
- Piano Sonata No. 1, in E major, Op. 6 (1825, published in 1826)
- Piano Sonata No. 2, in G minor, Op.posth. 105 (1821)
- Piano Sonata No. 3, in B♭ major, Op.posth. 106 (1827, published posthumously in 1868)

=== Songs Without Words ===
- Lieder ohne Worte (Songs Without Words)
  - Book 1, Op. 19b (1829–1830)
    1. Andante con moto in E major
    2. Andante espressivo in A minor
    3. Molto allegro e vivace in A major ("Hunting Song")
    4. Moderato in A major
    5. Poco agitato in F♯ minor
    6. Andante sostenuto in G minor ("Venezianisches Gondellied" [Venetian Boat Song] No. 1)
  - Book 2, Op. 30 (1833–1834)
    1. Andante espressivo in E♭ major
    2. Allegro di molto in B♭ minor
    3. Adagio non troppo in E major
    4. Agitato e con fuoco in B minor
    5. Andante grazioso in D major
    6. Allegretto tranquillo in F♯ minor ("Venezianisches Gondellied" or Venetian Boat Song No. 2)
  - Book 3, Op. 38 (1836–1837)
    1. Con moto in E♭ major
    2. Allegro non troppo in C minor
    3. Presto e molto vivace in E major
    4. Andante in A major
    5. Agitato in A minor
    6. Andante con moto in A♭ major ("Duetto")
  - Book 4, Op. 53 (1839–1841)
    1. Andante con moto in A♭ major
    2. Allegro non troppo in E♭ major
    3. Presto agitato in G minor
    4. Adagio in F major
    5. Allegro con fuoco in A minor ("Volkslied")
    6. Molto Allegro vivace in A major
  - Book 5, Op. 62 (1842–1844)
    1. Andante espressivo in G major
    2. Allegro con fuoco in B♭ major
    3. Andante maestoso in E minor ("Trauermarsch")
    4. Allegro con anima in G major
    5. Andante con moto in A minor ("Venezianisches Gondellied" or Venetian Boat Song No. 3)
    6. Allegretto grazioso in A major ("Frühlingslied" or "Spring Song")
  - Book 6, Op. 67 (1843–1845)
    1. Andante in E♭ major
    2. Allegro leggiero in F♯ minor
    3. Andante tranquillo in B♭ major
    4. Presto in C major ("Spinnerlied")
    5. Moderato in B minor
    6. Allegro non troppo in E major
  - Book 7, Op. 85 (1834–1845)
    1. Andante espressivo in F major
    2. Allegro agitato in A minor
    3. Presto in E♭ major
    4. Andante sostenuto in D major
    5. Allegretto in A major
    6. Allegretto con moto in B♭ major
  - Book 8, Op. 102 (1842–1845)
    1. Andante un poco agitato in E minor
    2. Adagio in D major
    3. Presto in C major
    4. Un poco agitato, ma andante in G minor
    5. Allegro vivace in A major ("Kinderstücke")
    6. Andante in C major

=== Miscellaneous pieces ===
- Capriccio in F♯ minor, Op. 5
- Pièces caractéristiques for piano, Op. 7 (1827)
  1. Sanft und mit Empfindung
  2. Mit heftiger Bewegung
  3. Kräftig und feurig
  4. Schnell und beweglich
  5. Ernst und mit steigender Lebhaftigkeit
  6. Sehnsüchtig
  7. Leicht und luftig
- Rondo capriccioso in E major/E minor, Op. 14
- Fantasia on "The Last Rose of Summer" in E major for piano, Op. 15 (1827)
- Fantasies or Caprices for piano, Op. 16 (1829)
  1. Fantasia in A minor
  2. Caprice or Scherzo in E minor
  3. Fantasia in E major ("The Rivulet")
- Fantasia in F♯ minor for piano, Op. 28 ("Sonate écossaise")
- 3 Caprices, Op. 33 (1834–1835)
  1. No 1. in A minor (1834)
  2. No 2. in E major (1834)
  3. No 3. in B♭ minor (1835)
- Six Preludes and Fugues, Op. 35
  1. Prelude and Fugue in E minor
  2. Prelude and Fugue in D major
  3. Prelude and Fugue in B minor
  4. Prelude and Fugue in A♭ major
  5. Prelude and Fugue in F minor
  6. Prelude and Fugue in B♭ major
- Variations sérieuses, Op. 54 (1841)
- Kinderstücke [Children's pieces] for piano, Op. 72 (1842)
  1. Allegro non troppo in G major
  2. Andante sostenuto in E♭ major
  3. Allegretto in G major
  4. Andante con moto in D major
  5. Allegro assai in G minor
  6. Vivace in F major
- Three Preludes for piano, Op. 104a (1834)
  1. Prelude in B♭ major
  2. Prelude in B minor
  3. Prelude in D major
- Three Études for piano, Op. 104b (1834–1838)
  1. Étude in B♭ minor
  2. Étude in F major
  3. Étude in A minor
- Album-leaf (Albumblatt) in E minor for piano, Op. 117, "Lied ohne Worte" (1837)
- Capriccio in E major for piano, Op. 118 (1837)
- Perpetuum Mobile in C major, Op. 119
- 3 Fugues
  1. Fugue in D minor
  2. Fugue in D minor
  3. Fugue in B minor
- Scherzo in B minor (1829)
- Scherzo a capriccio in F♯ minor (1835–36)
- Two Musical Sketches for piano, WoO 19 (1833)
  1. Andante cantabile in B♭ major
  2. Presto agitato in G minor

== See also ==
- List of compositions by Felix Mendelssohn
