= Concerto for Two Pianos and Orchestra in A-flat major (Mendelssohn) =

1824 composition by Felix Mendelssohn

Concerto for Two Pianos and Orchestra
- Piano concerto by Felix Mendelssohn
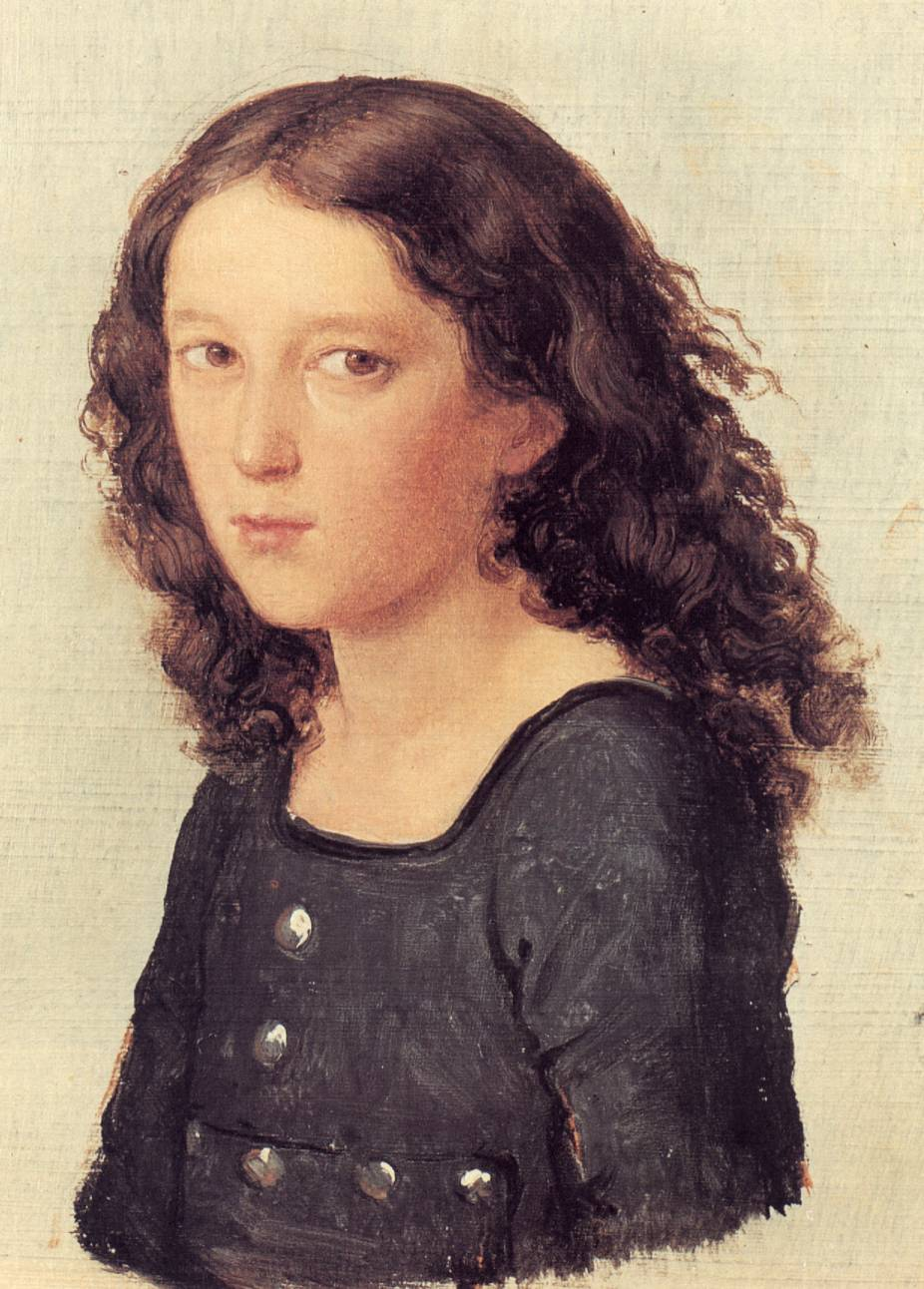
- Mendelssohn in 1821, age 12
- Key: A-flat major
- Composed: 1824
- Performed: 1825
- Movements: 3

The Concerto for Two Pianos and Orchestra in A♭ major was written by Felix Mendelssohn when he was 15 years old, and is dated 12 November 1824. Written for two pianos and a full orchestra, the work received its first public performance in Berlin, in 1825. The composer and his mentor Ignaz Moscheles, who inspired its composition, were the soloists. He performed it again on 20 February 1827 at Stettin, where the cathedral organist, composer, baritone singer and conductor Carl Loewe organised concerts. Loewe and Mendelssohn were the two piano soloists on that occasion.

This concerto and its predecessor, the E major concerto, may have been the first works composed for full orchestra by Mendelssohn. It may have been inspired by the occasion when Mendelssohn met Ignaz Moscheles in Berlin in 1824, when Moscheles accepted an invitation to visit Abraham Mendelssohn Bartholdy to give some music lessons to his children Felix and Fanny.

The concerto was not played for many years until the manuscript was found in the archive of the Berlin State Library in 1950.

== Structure ==
There are three movements:

1. Allegro vivace
2. Andante
3. Allegro vivace
