= Violin Sonata in F minor (Mendelssohn) =

1823 piano and violin composition by Felix Mendelssohn

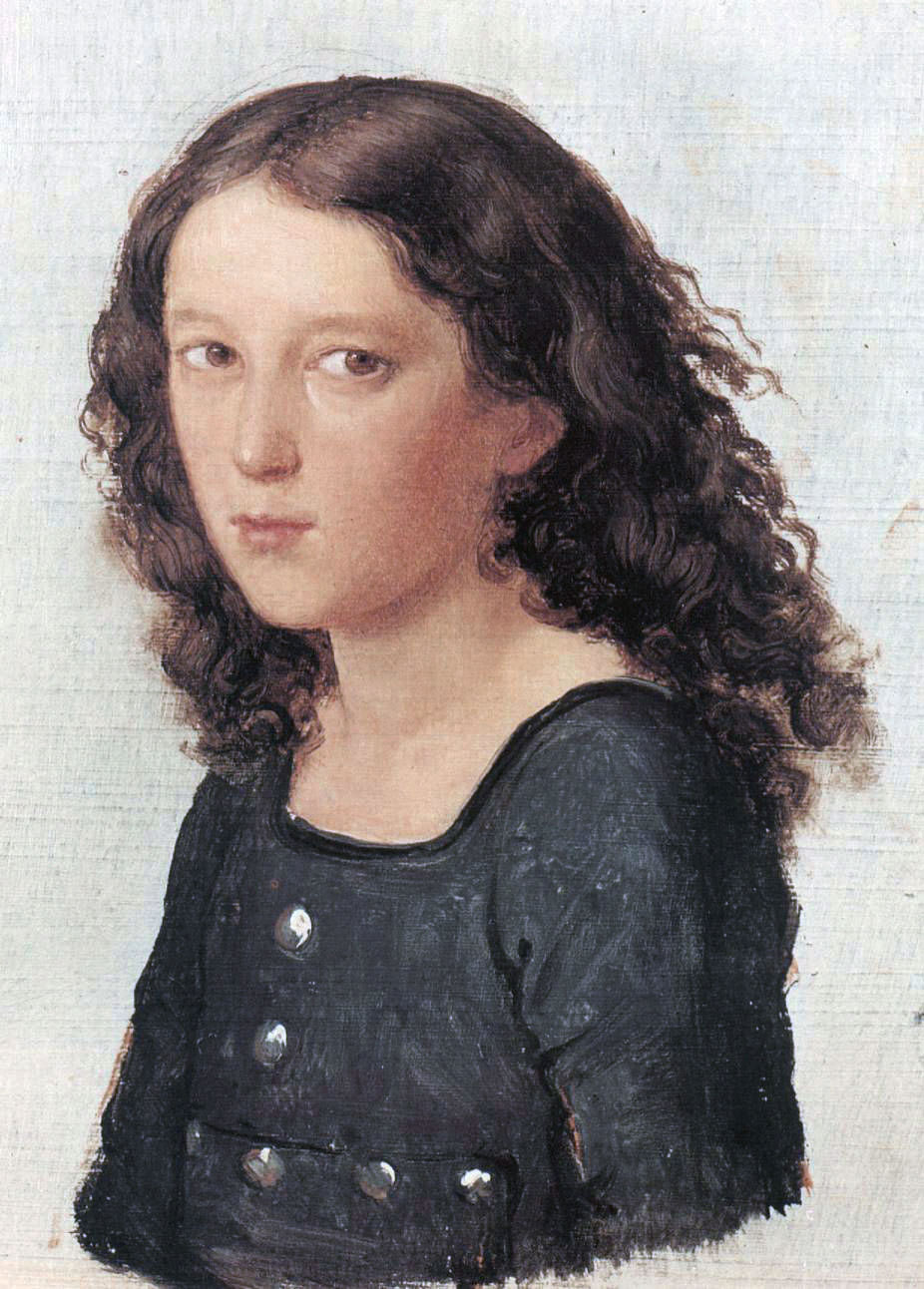
Felix Mendelssohn aged 12 (1821) by Carl Joseph Begas

The Violin Sonata (No. 2) in F minor, Op. 4, MWV Q 12 for violin and piano was composed by Felix Mendelssohn in 1823 and is the only one to carry an opus number. Mendelssohn composed two other violin sonatas, both in F major, that were not published in his lifetime. This was published with a dedication to his friend and violin teacher, Eduard Rietz, who was also dedicatee of the composer's Octet, Op. 20.

== Movements ==
The work has three movements:

1. Adagio – Allegro moderato
2. Poco adagio
3. Allegro agitato

A typical performance lasts about 22 minutes.

Unlike his more famous violin work, the Violin Concerto, this sonata lacks dramatic exposition.
