= Clarinet Sonata (Mendelssohn) =

Musical composition by Felix Mendelssohn

- by Felix Mendelssohn
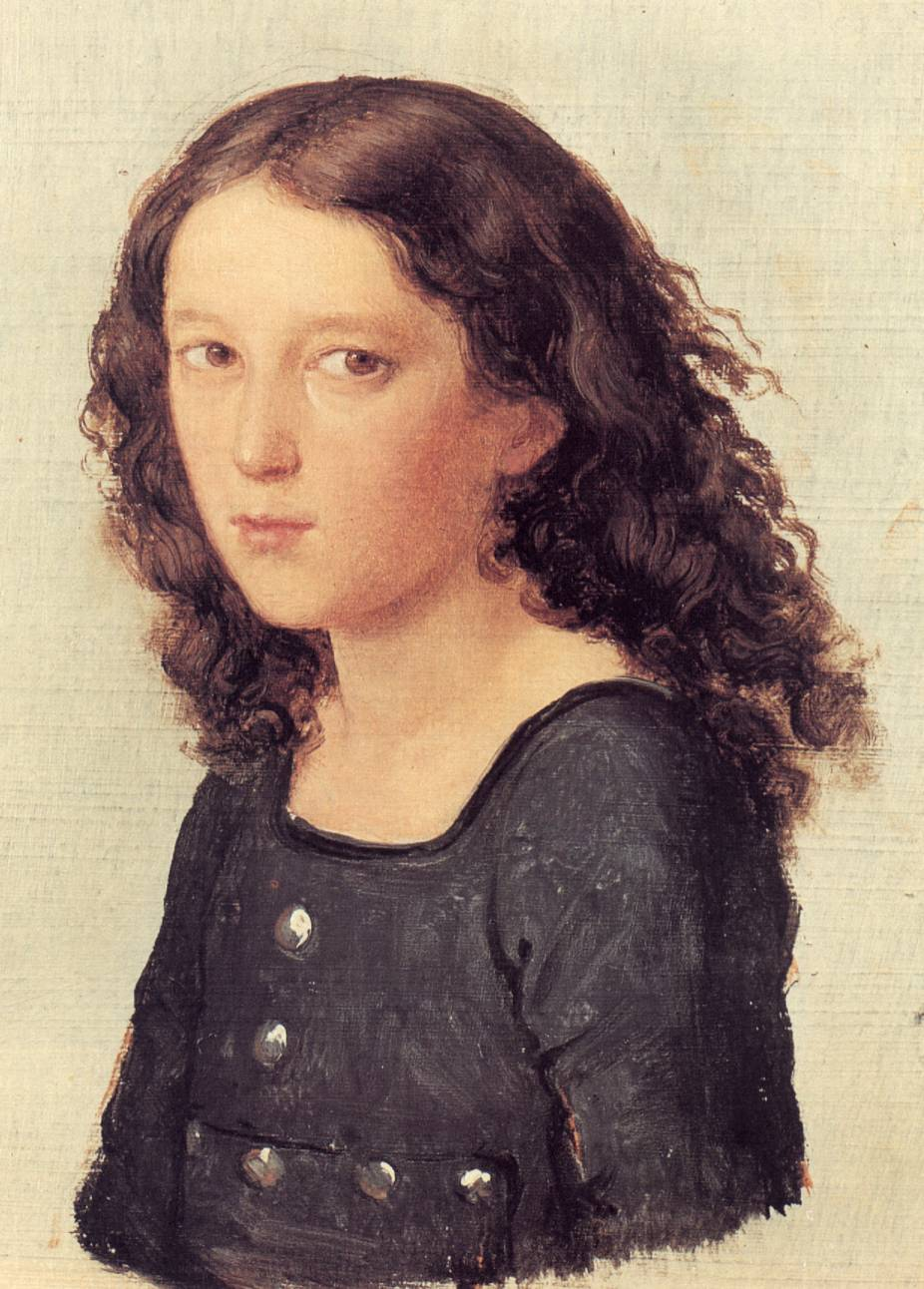
- The composer in 1821, portrayed by Carl Joseph Begas
- Key: E♭ major
- Catalogue: MWV Q15
- Composed: 1824

The Clarinet Sonata in E♭ major (MWV Q15) is a composition for clarinet and piano by Felix Mendelssohn.

== Background ==
What little information is available about the history of the work can be summarized as follows. The only wind instrument for which Felix Mendelssohn wrote any solo works is the clarinet. The famous clarinettist Heinrich Baermann and his son Carl for whom Mendelssohn composed the Konzertstücke opp. 113 and 114 (for clarinet, bassett horn and piano), were two of his close friends. These Konzertstücke are virtuoso concertante works, but the Sonata in E-flat major, written by Mendelssohn in 1824, when he was only 15, is genuine chamber music: the clarinet and the piano are both used equally as a melody and an accompaniment instrument, but the demands on the clarinettist are far more modest than in opp. 113 and 114. Albert Rice describes it as a musically weak student work. The various playing characteristics of the clarinet are not fully exploited; instead, Mendelssohn focuses more on the cantabile character of the instrument – as he does in his orchestral works.

There is no specific information about the history of origin of this sonata. For some time, the copy owned by the Deutsche Staatsbibliothek Berlin – Preußischer Kulturbesitz was the only known source of the work, on the title page of which the copyist noted in ink: "Sonate für B Clarinette u. Pianoforte / von Mendelssohn Bartholdi." The following remarks were added by another hand, also in ink: "NB: Dieser Titel befindet sich nicht darauf [Refers to the version used by the copyist – probably the autograph], sondem bloß die Zu-Eignung an mich! / 1824." [NB: This title is not written on it, but only the dedication to me is! / 1824]. Furthermore, "Kaskel in Dresden" was added in pencil.

Baron Karl von Kaskel, who was also friends with Giacomo Meyerbeer and Richard Wagner, was a banker and a patron of the arts in Dresden. If the autograph was indeed dedicated to Kaskel, he must have been an amateur clarinettist; judging by the relatively simple clarinet part, the sonata was apparently meant for an amateur and not for a virtuoso. There is no evidence for the presupposition that the work is dedicated to Heinrich Baermann. In any case, the additional comment on the title page of the Berlin copy was definitely not written by Baermann. The dating merely suggests that whomever the autograph was dedicated to, had it copied in 1824 (perhaps at the request of Mendelssohn); the composition was probably written not much earlier.

Although the autograph is now available again in the Pierpont Morgan Library, New York (from the Mary Flagler Cary Music Collection), it does not help to solve the problem concerning the Berlin copy. It consists of 10 sheets of 16-stave music paper, 17 pages of which have been written on (the bottom staff of each page was left blank). The pages have been cut to a considerably smaller size: the top of the first page only shows part of Mendelssohn's fervent prayer "L. e. g. G." (Lass es gelingen, Gott! – Let it be successful, Lord!) and the lower right hand corner of sheet 9r, below the ornament at the end of the composition, only displays the date "d. 17 April" without the year. A title page (which could have given the dedication) does not exist; merely "Sonata" is written above the first staff.

== Structure ==
The sonata has three movements:

1. Adagio — Allegro moderato
2. Andante (G minor)
3. Allegro moderato

Mendelssohn: Clarinet Sonata (2nd movement: Andante)

== Notable recordings ==
- Alan Hacker on an early 19th-century Bilton boxwood clarinet & Richard Burnett on an 1826 Conrad Graf fortepiano (Vienna); Amon Ra CD-SAR 38 (1989).
- Charles Neidich on a clarinet by Rudolph Tutz (Innsbruck, 1990) after Carl Augustin Grenser, Son (Dresden, c. 1810) & Robert D. Levin on a pianoforte by Johann Fritz (Wien, 1825) restored by Edwin Beunk & Johan Wennink (1992); Sony Classical SK 64 302 (1994).
- Owen Watkins on a clarinet by Joel Robinson (New York) after Heinrich Grenser & Penelope Crawford on Conrad Graf's fortepiano Opus 2148 (Vienna, 1835); Musica Omnia mo0304 (2009).

== Arrangements ==
- Jörg Widmann: Andante for clarinet, string orchestra, harp and celestra (2016)
