= Lord, have mercy upon us (Mendelssohn) =

Lord, have mercy upon us Herr, sei gnädig
- Motet by Felix Mendelssohn
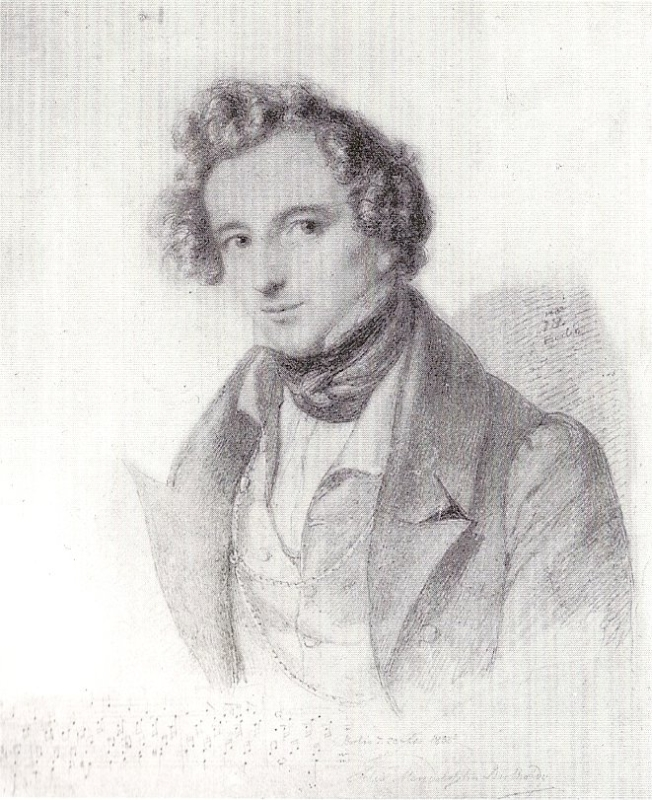
- The composer in 1833
- Other name: Zum Abendsegen; Responses to the Commandments
- Key: A minor
- Catalogue: WoO 12; MWV B 27
- Text: from Book of Common Prayer
- Language: English; German
- Composed: 1833
- Published: 1842
- Scoring: SATB choir

Lord, have mercy upon us (in German: Herr, sei gnädig), WoO. 12, MWV B 27, is the incipit of a motet for choir a cappella in both English and German composed by Felix Mendelssohn in 1833. It is also known in English as Responses to the Commandments, and in German as Zum Abendsegen. It was published in 1842, both in English and German, and by Breitkopf & Härtel in 1875 in the complete edition of the composer's works.

== History ==
Mendelssohn composed the motet in 1833 for use in the Anglican Church. The first line in English is "Lord, have mercy upon us", an anonymous response to the Commandments from the Book of Common Prayer. The motet was published by Ewer in London c. 1842 as Lord Have Mercy upon Us / Responses to the Commandments. In German, the first line is "Herr, sei gnädig unserm Flehn" (Lord, be merciful to our plea). It was published by Bösenberg in Leipzig in an Album für Gesang as Zum Abendsegen (For the evening blessing), which was erroneously translated as To the Evening Service. The motet was published by Breitkopf & Härtel in 1875 in their complete edition of the composer's works.

== Text and music ==
The text is based on traditional anonymous Responses to the Comandments in the Book of Common Prayer, which read:

English

Lord, have mercy upon us,
and fill us with thy spirit;
O Lord, have mercy
and inscribe thy commandment in our hearts.
O Lord, hear us!

German

Herr, sei gnädig unserm Flehn,
und erfülle uns mit deinem Geist;
Herr, sei gnädig
und schreib in unser Herz dein Gebot.
Herr, erhör uns!

Mendelssohn's wording is slightly different: "Herr, sei gnädig unserm Flehn, neig unser Herz zu deinem Wort, und schreibe dein Gebot ins Herz, das dich suchet." (Lord, have mercy to our plea, turn our hearts to your word, and inscribe your commandment in the heart that seeks you.) The music is in one movement in A minor and common time, marked Andante. The piece begins with two long chords like a call, both with fermatas, "Herr! Herr!" (Lord! Lord!). The tenor than begins a theme for a fugal development, reminiscent of the style of Renaissance polyphony, followed by alto, soprano and bass. The words "Herr" and "gnädig" (merciful" are accented by a melisma, the former a rising melody, the latter with an upward tritone for added intensity. A slow chromatic upward scale appears first in the alto in measures 25 and 26, again intesifying "gnädig", repeated by the sopranos. It is immediately followed by "und schreibe dein Gebot ins Herz" (and inscribe your commandment to the heart), the only section in homophony. When this text is repeated, the first theme is used again in imitation, first by the alto. The piece ends with the chromatic scales, now on "Herz" (heart). It has been characterized as with "a poignant intensity arising out of his subtle (and supple) handling of contrapuntally overlapping textures".

Robert Schumann used elements from the theme in the slow movement of his first Piano Trio in D minor, Op. 63. In 1856, Johannes Brahms took elements from both themes in the unpublished Missa canonica which he wrote as a study in counterpoint with Joseph Joachim. He used the theme, broadened in tempo and shortened in notes, on the text is Agnus Dei, also a call for mercy.

== Recording ==
The motet was recorded, with other motets by Mendelssohn, by the RIAS Kammerchor conducted by Marcus Creed. In 2005, it was recorded by the St John's College Choir Cambridge, conducted by David Hill. The Chamber Choir of Europe recorded it to conclude a collection of Mendelssohn's choral works, conducted by Nicol Matt, in 2006.
