= Festgesang =

Song by Felix Mendelssohn

- Festive Cantata by Felix Mendelssohn
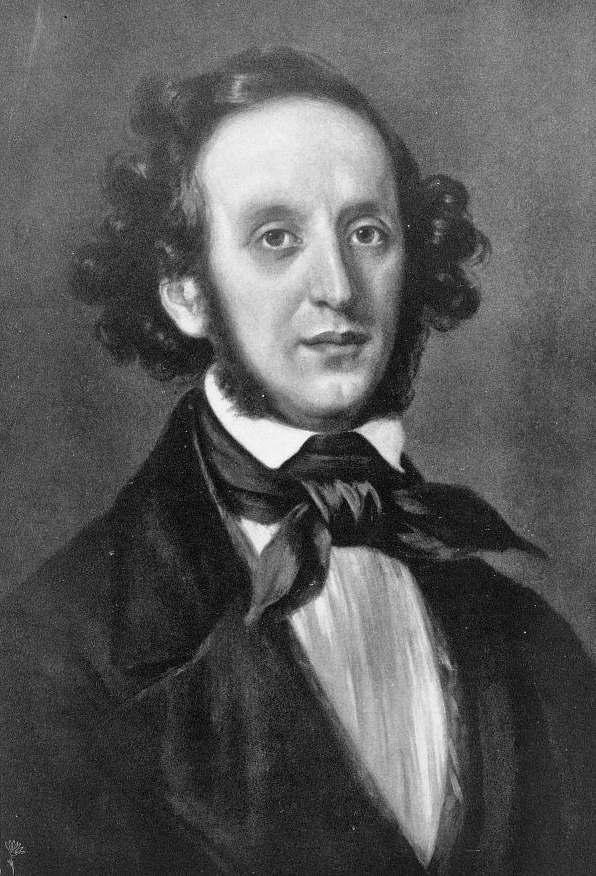
- The composer in 1845, portrayed by Eduard Magnus
- Other name: "Gutenberg Cantata"
- Catalogue: MWV D 4
- Related: "Hark! The Herald Angels Sing"
- Occasion: Celebration of Johannes Gutenberg
- Text: Adolf Eduard Proelss and two Lutheran chorales
- Language: German
- Performed: 24 June 1840: Leipzig
- Movements: Four
- Scoring: men's chorus; two brass orchestras; timpani

The "Festgesang", also known as the "Gutenberg Cantata", was composed by Felix Mendelssohn in the first half of 1840 for performance in Leipzig at the celebrations to mark the putative 400th anniversary of the invention of printing with movable type by Johannes Gutenberg. The full title is Festgesang zur Eröffnung der am ersten Tage der vierten Säkularfeier der Erfindung der Buchdruckerkunst auf dem Marktplatz zu Leipzig stattfindenden Feierlichkeiten (Ceremonial song for the opening of the celebrations taking place on the first day of the quadricentennial celebration of the invention of the art of printing on the market square in Leipzig). It was first performed in the market-square at Leipzig on 24 June 1840.

The piece is scored for male chorus with two brass orchestras and timpani, and consists of four parts, the first and last based on established Lutheran chorales. Part 2, beginning "Vaterland, in deinen Gauen", was later adapted to the words of Charles Wesley’s Christmas carol "Hark! The Herald Angels Sing". The original German words for Festgesang were by Adolf Eduard Proelss (1803–1882). The use of a large choir and two orchestras was designed to make use of the natural acoustics of the market-place to produce an impressive, resonant sound.

Mendelssohn wrote at least two other "Festgesänge", with which the present work are sometimes confused, known as Festgesang an die Künstler (1846) and Festgesang (“Möge das Siegeszeichen” [1838]).

== Lyrics ==
| German | English |
|---|---|
| 1. Choral; Begeht mit heil’gem Lobgesang; die große Freudenstunde, kommt, singet tausendstimmig Dank dem Herrn mit Herz und Munde. Er hat uns diesen Tag gemacht, er hat aus dicht verhüllter Nacht das Licht hervorgerufen. Jahrhunderte schon freuen sich in seinem hellen Strahle, und immer weiter gießt es sich bis in die fernsten Tale. Wo Finsternis und Gram einst lag, da glänzt nun sonnenhell der Tag. O preist den Gott der Liebe! | 1. Chorale; Commemorate with holy hymns; the great hour of joy which comes, let a thousand voices sing thanks to the Lord with heart and mouth. He made this day for us, he has from thickly shrouded night elicited the light. Centuries already rejoice in its bright radiance, and it continues to pour to the farthest valleys. Where darkness and sorrow once lay, the day now shines as if sunlit. O praise the God of love! |
| 2. Lied; Vaterland, in deinen Gauen; brach der goldne Tag einst an. Deutschland, deine Völker sahn seinen Schimmer niedertauen. Gutenberg, der deutsche Mann, zündete die Fackel an. Neues, allgewaltges Streben wogt im Land des Lichtes auf, seinem raschen Siegeslauf folgt ein allbeglückend Leben. Gutenberg, der große Mann, hat dies hehre Werk getan. Ob die Finsternis sich wehrt, ob sie führet tausend Streiche, ob sie wütet, sich empört, sie erblasst, sie sinkt als Leiche, doch gekrönt als Siegesheld, steht das Licht vor aller Welt. Gutenberg, du wackrer Mann, du stehst glorreich auf dem Plan. | 2. Song; Fatherland, in your shires; the golden day once dawned. Germany, your peoples saw its shimmer bring a thaw. Gutenberg, the German man, kindled the torch. New, all-powerful striving rises in the land of light, its triumphant progress followed by all-blessed life. Gutenberg the great man has done this noble work. Whether the darkness defends itself, whether it pulls a thousand tricks, whether it rages outraged, still it pales, sinks like a corpse, while crowned as a champion, stands the light before all the world. Gutenberg, you brave man, you stand gloriously in the [divine] plan. |
| 3. Allegro molto Der Herr, der sprach: Es werde Licht!; Er half im harten Streite, er stand mit Trost und Zuversicht beschützend dir zur Seite. Der Glaube an sein heilig Wort war deine Wehr, dein Schild, dein Hort, so musstest du gewinnen. Heil dir, nun krönt Unsterblichkeit dich, frommer Held, mit Herrlichkeit; Heil dir, Heil uns in Ewigkeit. | 3. Allegro molto The Lord who said: Let there be light!; He helped you in the harder fight, he stood with consolation and confidence, protective at your side. Faith in his holy word was your defense, your shield, your haven, so that you had to win. Hail, now immortality crowns you, pious hero, with glory. Hail to you, hail to us forever. |
| 4. Choral; Heil ihm! Heil uns! So schallt; zu deinen heilgen Thronen, Herr, unser Gott, hinauf der Ruf von Millionen, und brünstig flehen wir: lass in des Lichtes Schein der ganzen Menschheit Heil, Herr, immermehr gedeihn. | 4. Chorale; Hail him! Hail us! So sounds; to your holy thrones above, Lord, our God, the call of millions, and fervently we beg: let the light shine with salvation for all mankind, Lord, and prosper forever. |
