= String Quintet No. 2 (Mendelssohn) =

String Quintet
- No. 2
- by Felix Mendelssohn
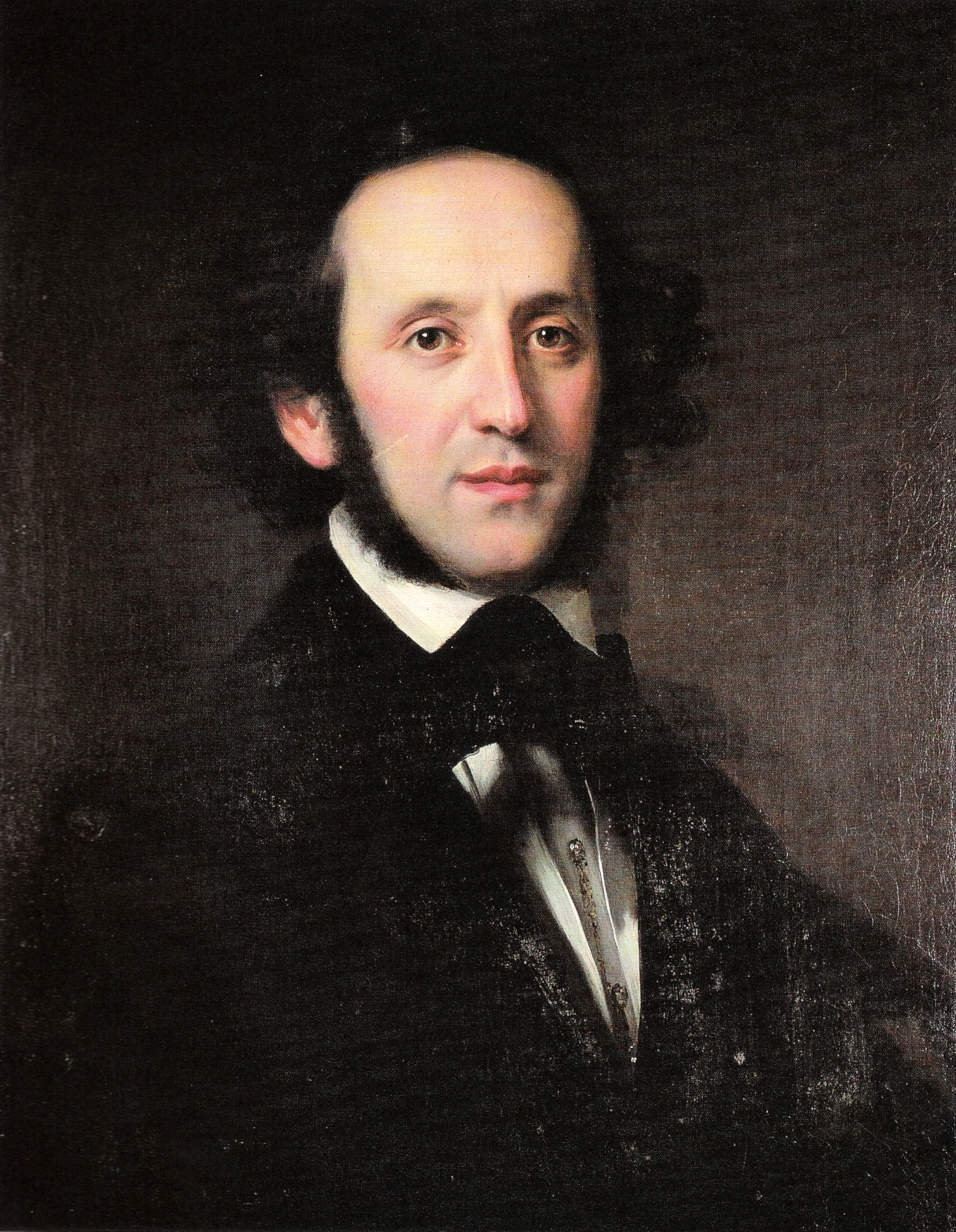
- Portrait of Mendelssohn by Eduard Magnus, 1846
- Key: B-flat major
- Opus: 87
- Composed: 1845
- Published: 1851
- Movements: 4
- Scoring: 2 violins; 2 violas; cello

The String Quintet No. 2 in B♭ major, Op. 87, was composed by Felix Mendelssohn in 1845, when Mendelssohn was around 36 years old. The piece is scored for two violins, two violas and cello.

== Movements ==
Like all of Mendelssohn's string quartets, this work has four movements:

1. Allegro vivace
2. Andante scherzando
3. Adagio e lento
4. Allegro molto vivace

A typical performance lasts just under 30 minutes.

It was published posthumously in 1851 (described by its first publisher, Breitkopf und Härtel, as No. 16 der nachgelassenen Werke.)
