= Assai tranquillo (Mendelssohn) =

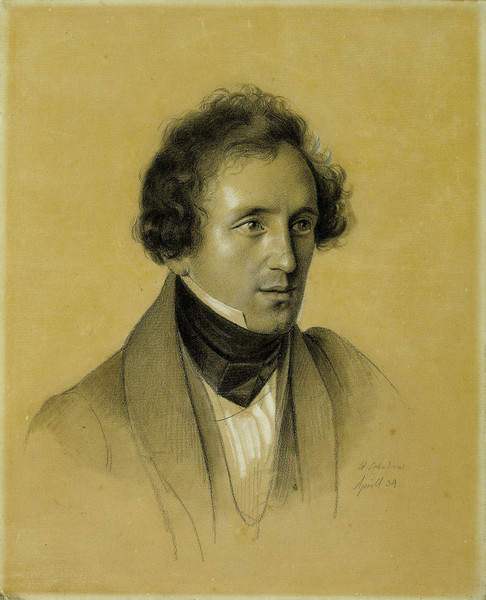
Felix Mendelssohn by Friedrich Wilhelm Schadow, 1834

Assai tranquillo, in B minor, is a work written for cello and piano by Felix Mendelssohn. The piece was composed on 25 July 1835 on a journey from Düsseldorf to Leipzig. Mendelssohn dedicated it to the cellist Julius Rietz, who was the composer's assistant Kapellmeister in Düsseldorf. The piece, whose parts serenely weave together, passing the melody and the running eighth notes back and forth, was likely left incomplete, as it ends with a pause on the dominant, an F♯.

The piece was not published until 1962, when a reproduction of the facsimile was included in Reinhold Sietz's article Das Stammbuch von Julius Rietz, and was first recorded by Hyperion Records on their recording of Mendelssohn's complete works for cello and piano.
