= Four Pieces for String Quartet (Mendelssohn) =

Felix Mendelssohn wrote four pieces for string quartet that were published together as his “Opus 81” after his death. They have at times wrongly been presented as a single work, even as his “String Quartet No. 7”:

- Tema con variazioni (Andante sostenuto) in E major, Op. 81/1, written in 1847
- Scherzo (Allegro leggiero) in A minor, Op. 81/2, also from 1847
- Capriccio (Andante con moto) in E minor, Op. 81/3, from 1843
- Fugue (A tempo ordinario) in E♭ major, Op. 81/4, written in 1827
