= Cello Sonata No. 2 (Mendelssohn) =

Cello Sonata in D major, Op. 58
I. Allegro assai vivace

II. Allegretto scherzando

III. Adagio

IV. Molto allegro e vivace
Performed by John Michel & Lisa Bergman

Felix Mendelssohn's Cello Sonata No. 2 in D major, Op. 58, was composed in late 1842 (announced in November letters) — first half of 1843 (published in July by F. Kistner). The main theme of the first movement is a reworking of an unrealised Piano Sonata in G major.

The Cello Sonata, which was dedicated to the Russian/Polish cellist Count Mateusz Wielhorski, has four movements:

1. Allegro assai vivace
2. Allegretto scherzando (in B minor)
3. Adagio (in G major)
4. Molto allegro e vivace

A typical performance lasts 25 minutes.

Of particular interest is the Adagio, because it mirrors Mendelssohn's fascination with the music of J.S. Bach. (He was then musical director of the Gewandhaus concerts at Leipzig and, as such, Bach's distant successor.) The movement consists of a chorale in Bach's typical style, played by the piano in rich arpeggios. In between the phrases of the chorale, the cello plays recitative-like passages, which resemble the recitative of the Fantasia in the Chromatic Fantasia and Fugue, BWV 903, and quotes its final passage.
