= Violin Sonata in F major (Mendelssohn, 1838) =

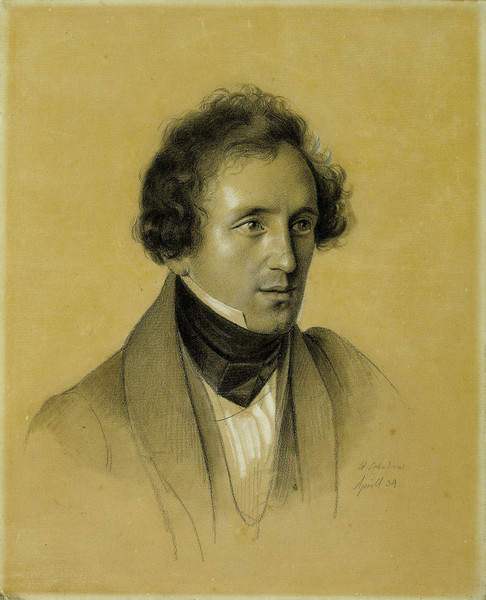
Felix Mendelssohn by Friedrich Wilhelm Schadow, 1834

The Violin Sonata (No. 3) in F major, MWV Q 26, was composed in 1838 by Felix Mendelssohn, but remained unpublished during the composer's lifetime. It remained so until 1953 when violinist Yehudi Menuhin arranged it for publication.

== Background ==
Mendelssohn began work on the Violin Sonata in 1838, the same year he started work on the Violin Concerto in E minor. By the 15th of June 1838 he had completed the composition in draft form, but rejected the work as a "wretched sonata". (Note: Sharona Volcano speculates this may have been the result of a play-through with Ferdinand David to whom Mendelssohn had intended to dedicate the piece.)

It was not until 1839 that Mendelssohn began work on revising the sonata by rewriting the first movement. However the task remained uncompleted at his death in 1847 and it was not until 1953, that violinist Yehudi Menuhin revived the work and prepared it for publication by revising the first movement based on Mendelssohn's incomplete revision.

== Structure ==
I. Allegro vivace

II. Adagio

III. Assai vivace
Performed by Jinjoo Cho & Itamar Golan

The composition has three movements:

1. Allegro vivace
2. Adagio
3. Assai vivace

A typical performance lasts roughly 22 minutes.
