= Lauda Sion (Mendelssohn) =

Composition by Felix Mendelssohn

- by Felix Mendelssohn
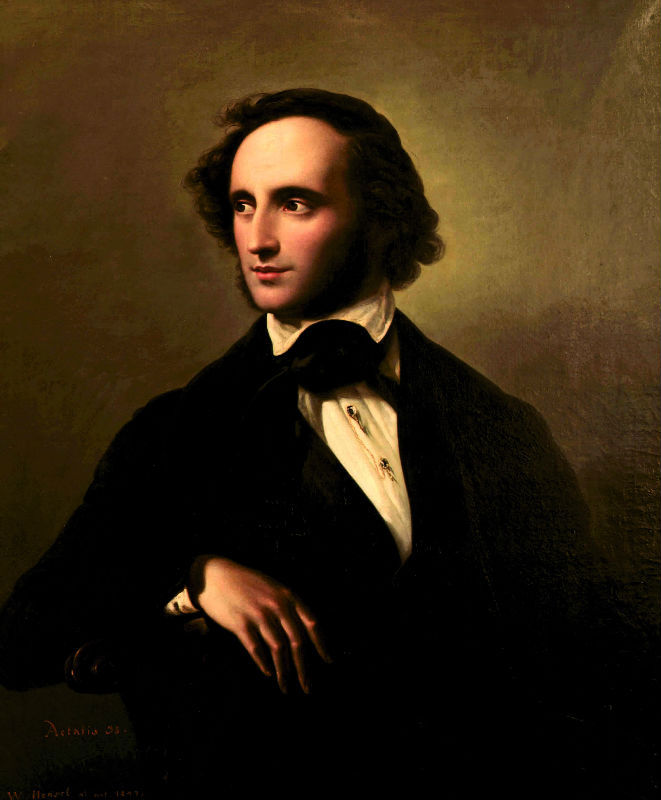
- The composer in 1847, portrait by Wilhelm Hensel
- Catalogue: MWV A 24
- Opus: 73
- Text: Lauda Sion
- Language: Latin
- Composed: 1845–1846
- Published: 1848
- Duration: 30 min.
- Scoring: soloists; SATB choir; orchestra

Lauda Sion (Praise Zion), Op. 73, (MWV A 24) is an extended composition by Felix Mendelssohn. He set parts of Lauda Sion, a sequence in Latin for Corpus Christi in 1846. The piece in eight movements is scored for soloists, a four-part choir and orchestra.

== History ==
Mendelssohn was ready to set music for different denominations. He received a commission for a setting of the Lauda Sion sequence from a Belgian church musician, to be performed at the church St. Martin in Liège in 1846, commemorating the feast's 600th anniversary. Mendelssohn began the work in 1845, at the same time as his oratorio Elijah, and completed it in 1846. It was published after his death, in 1848. Carus published it in a critical edition in 1996.

== Music ==
Mendelssohn structured the text in eight movements:

1. Lauda Sion Salvatorem
2. Laudis thema specialis
3. Sit laus plena
4. In hac mensa
5. Docti sacris institutis
6. Sub diversis speciebus
7. Caro cibus
8. Sumit unus
