= String Quartet No. 6 (Mendelssohn) =

String quartet by Felix Mendelssohn Bartholdy

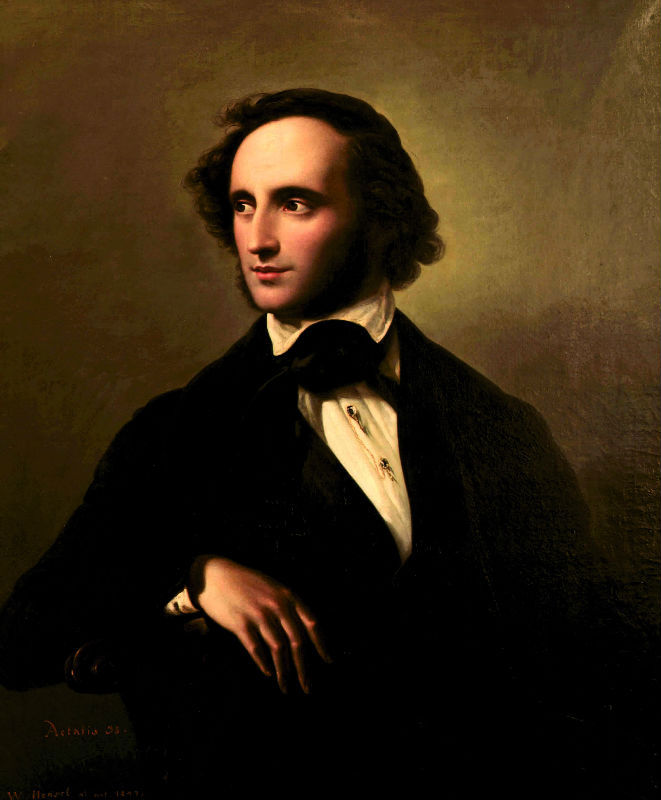
Mendelssohn in 1847

I. Allegro vivace assai

II. Allegro assai

III. Adagio

IV. Finale: Allegro molto
Performed by the Musopen String Quartet

The String Quartet No. 6 in F minor, Op. 80 was composed by Felix Mendelssohn in 1847. It was the last major piece he completed before he died two months later, on 4 November 1847. It is believed he composed the piece as a homage to his sister Fanny, who died on 14 May of that year.

The quartet was first heard in private on 5 October 1847 in the presence of Ignaz Moscheles. The first public performance was on 4 November 1848 at the Leipzig Konservatorium with Joseph Joachim, Mendelssohn's young mentee, playing the violin. The other members of the quartet were Moritz Klengel, Freidrich Hermann, and Carl Wittman, all regular performers with Leipzig's Gewandhaus Orchestra. The score was published posthumously in 1850 by Breitkopf & Härtel, Mendelssohn's longtime publishing house. The original manuscript is stored in the Jagiellonian Library in Kraków, Poland.

== Movements ==
The string quartet has four movements:

1. Allegro vivace assai
2. Allegro assai
3. Adagio
4. Finale: Allegro molto
