= Violin Sonata in F major (Mendelssohn, 1820) =

The Violin Sonata (No. 1) in F major, MWV Q 7, was composed in 1820 by Felix Mendelssohn at the age of eleven. It has three movements:

1. Allegro
2. Andante
3. Presto

A typical performance lasts about 15 minutes. It was first published in 1977.
