= Die beiden Neffen =

- Singspiel by Felix Mendelssohn
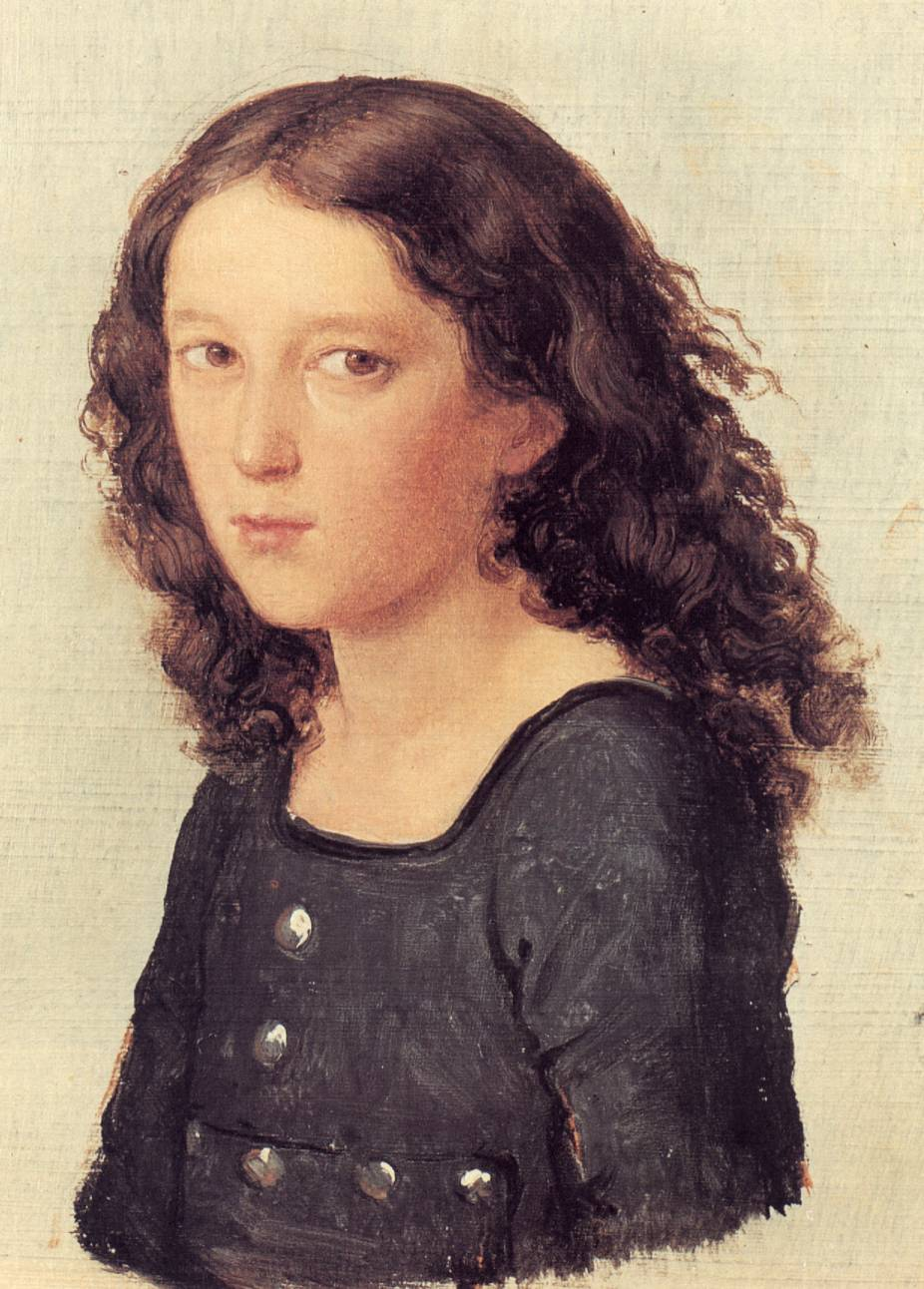
- The composer, who wrote the piece for a family performance around 1822, in 1821
- Translation: The Two Nephews or The Uncle from Boston
- Other title: Der Onkel aus Boston
- Librettist: Johann Ludwig Casper
- Language: German
- Premiere: 3 February 1824; Mendelssohn's home

Die beiden Neffen (The Two Nephews), also known as Der Onkel aus Boston (The Uncle from Boston), is a three-act Singspiel by Felix Mendelssohn to a libretto by Johann Ludwig Casper.

== Background ==
Die beiden Neffen was written by between May 1822 and 1823, during which time Mendelssohn celebrated his fourteenth birthday. The libretto was by Casper who had provided books for his three previous Singspiels, Die Soldatenliebschaft (Soldier's Love) (1820), Die beiden Pädagogen (The Two Teachers) (1821) and Die wandernden Komödianten (The Roving Actors) (1822). Die beiden Neffen was the last of their collaborations. These pieces were designed for performance within the family circle at the musical gatherings regularly organised by Felix's father Abraham Mendelssohn. Die beiden Neffen was performed in the garden house of the Mendelssohn family on Felix's 15th birthday (3 February 1824). Like Mendelssohn's other juvenile operas, the work shows the influence of Mozart and Carl Maria von Weber, but without any of the individuality which began to show in the later Die Hochzeit des Camacho.

The dialogue for the third act has been lost, but has been reconstructed, enabling the first modern performances; on 3 October 2004 (concert performance in Essen), and on 14 April 2007 (staged performance, Pfalztheater, Kaiserslautern). There is also a CD recording conducted by Helmuth Rilling.

== Roles ==
Role	Voice type	Premiere Cast, 3 February 1824 (Conductor: - )
Fanny	soprano	
Lisette	soprano	
Count Felsig	bass	
Carl	tenor	
Theodor	tenor	
Berg	bass	
Peasants, etc.		

== Synopsis ==
Brandenburg in the 1780s. Baron von Felsig has returned unexpectedly from New England. The consequent problems of mistaken identities and misunderstandings fill out an undistinguished storyline leading to a traditional happy ending.

== Recordings ==
Die beiden Neffen oder Der Onkel aus Boston, Kate Royal, Lothar Odinius, Carsten Süß, Gächinger Kantorei, Bach-Collegium Stuttgart, Helmut Rilling, Hänssler Classics, 2004

== Sources ==
- Oxford Music Online
- James L. Zychowitz, Mendelssohn Bartholdy: Der Onkel aus Boston (review), Opera Today, 30 September 2005
