= String Quartet No. 4 (Mendelssohn) =

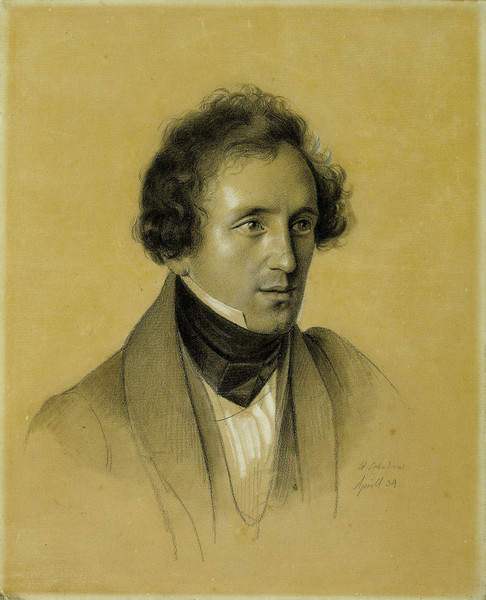
Felix Mendelssohn by Friedrich Wilhelm Schadow, 1834

The String Quartet No. 4 in E minor, Op. 44, No. 2, was composed by Felix Mendelssohn in 1837, and revised in 1839.

This work was premièred on 29 October 1837 at Leipzig with great success, and published as a full score in 1840. The piece is part of the Op. 44 set of 3 string quartets that Mendelssohn dedicated to the Crown Prince of Sweden. While Mendelssohn's first and second quartet were written under the influence of Beethoven, Op.44 exhibits a clear sprouting of the composer's originality in style.

== Movements ==
Like all of Mendelssohn's string quartets, this work has four movements:

1. Allegro assai appassionato
2. Scherzo: Allegro di molto
3. Andante
4. Presto agitato

A typical performance just under 30 minutes.
