= String Quartet No. 3 (Mendelssohn) =

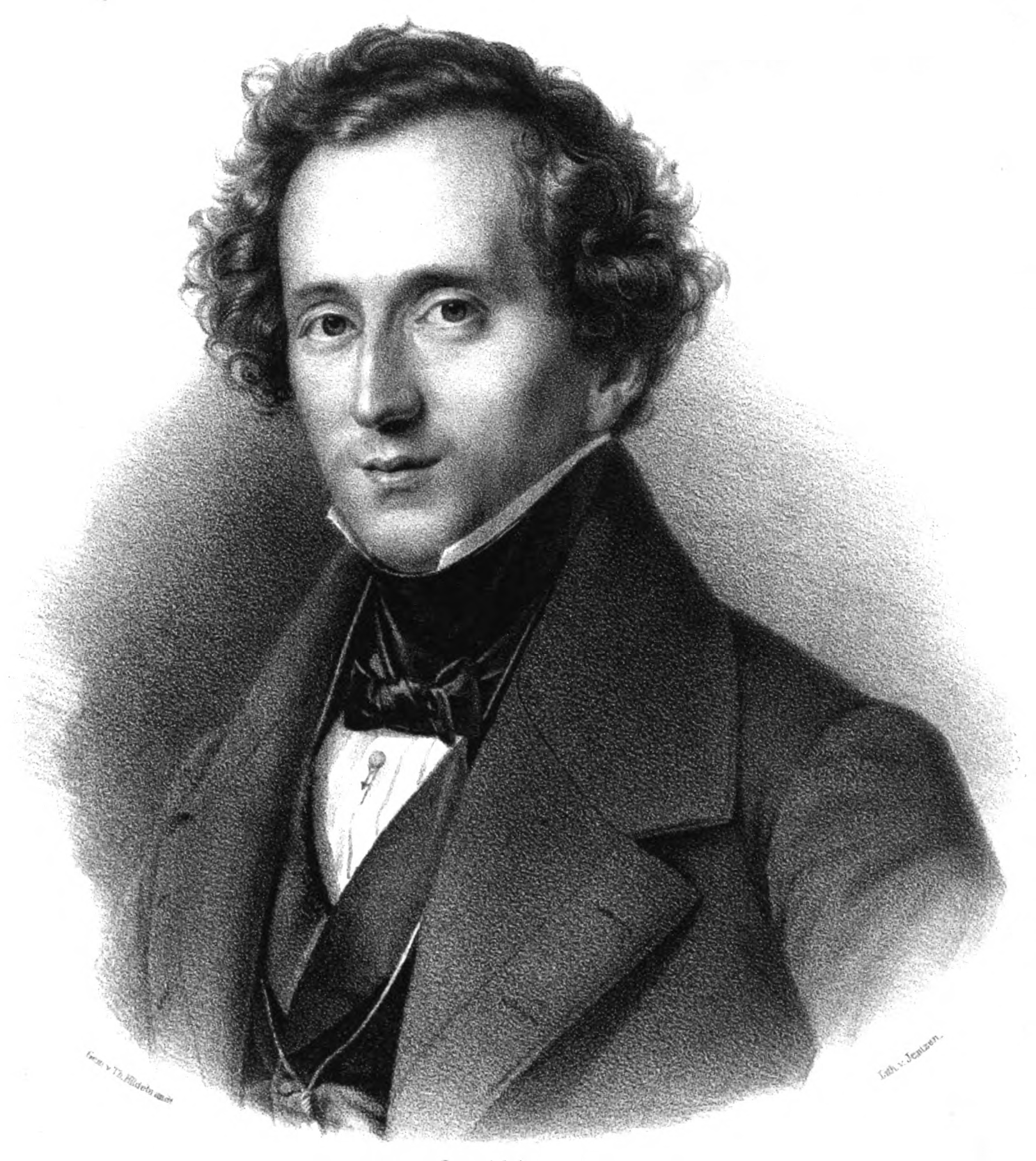
Felix Mendelssohn in 1837

I. Molto allegro vivace

II. Menuetto: Un poco Allegretto

III. Andante espressivo ma con moto

IV. Presto con brio
Performed by the United States Marine Band

The String Quartet No. 3 in D major, Op. 44, No. 1, MWV R 30 was composed by Felix Mendelssohn in July 1838 at the age of 29. It premiered in 1839, then was published later in 1840. It is a traditional string quartet, comprising two violins, a viola, and a cello. The piece is part of the Op. 44 set of three string quartets that Mendelssohn dedicated to the Crown Prince of Sweden.

== Movements ==
Like all of Mendelssohn's string quartets, this work has four movements:

1. Molto allegro vivace
2. Menuetto: Un poco Allegretto
3. Andante espressivo ma con moto
4. Presto con brio

A typical performance lasts about 29-31 minutes.

== Evaluation ==
Frederick Corder, professor of composition at the Royal Academy of Music, used it as an example of unsuccessful quartet-writing:

Beethoven and Schubert have shown us that the theoretically perfect string-quartet should have an almost equal amount of interest in each of the four parts; […] Now the chief characteristic of Mendelssohn's music is its broad and singing character, passage-writing is his weak point. Consequently, however good his quartets, one cannot but feel that they would sound better if scored for full orchestra. Take the opening of Op. 44, No. 1, for instance—

In the first place, this is not quartet-writing at all; there is a melody, a bass, and the rest is mere fill-up matter: in the second, we have here as thorough an orchestral theme as could be devised—the ear yearns for trumpets and drums in the fourth bar. A similar case occurs in the F minor Quartet (op. 95), and the expression 'symphony in disguise' has accordingly often been applied to these works.
