= Cello Sonata No. 1 (Mendelssohn) =

Felix Mendelssohn's Cello Sonata No. 1 in B♭ major, Op. 45 was composed in October 1838. The cello sonata has three movements:

1. Allegro vivace
2. Andante (in G minor)
3. Allegro assai

A typical performance of the sonata lasts 25 minutes.
