= Concerto for Two Pianos and Orchestra in E major (Mendelssohn) =

1823 composition by Felix Mendelssohn

Concerto for Two Pianos and Orchestra
- Piano concerto by Felix Mendelssohn
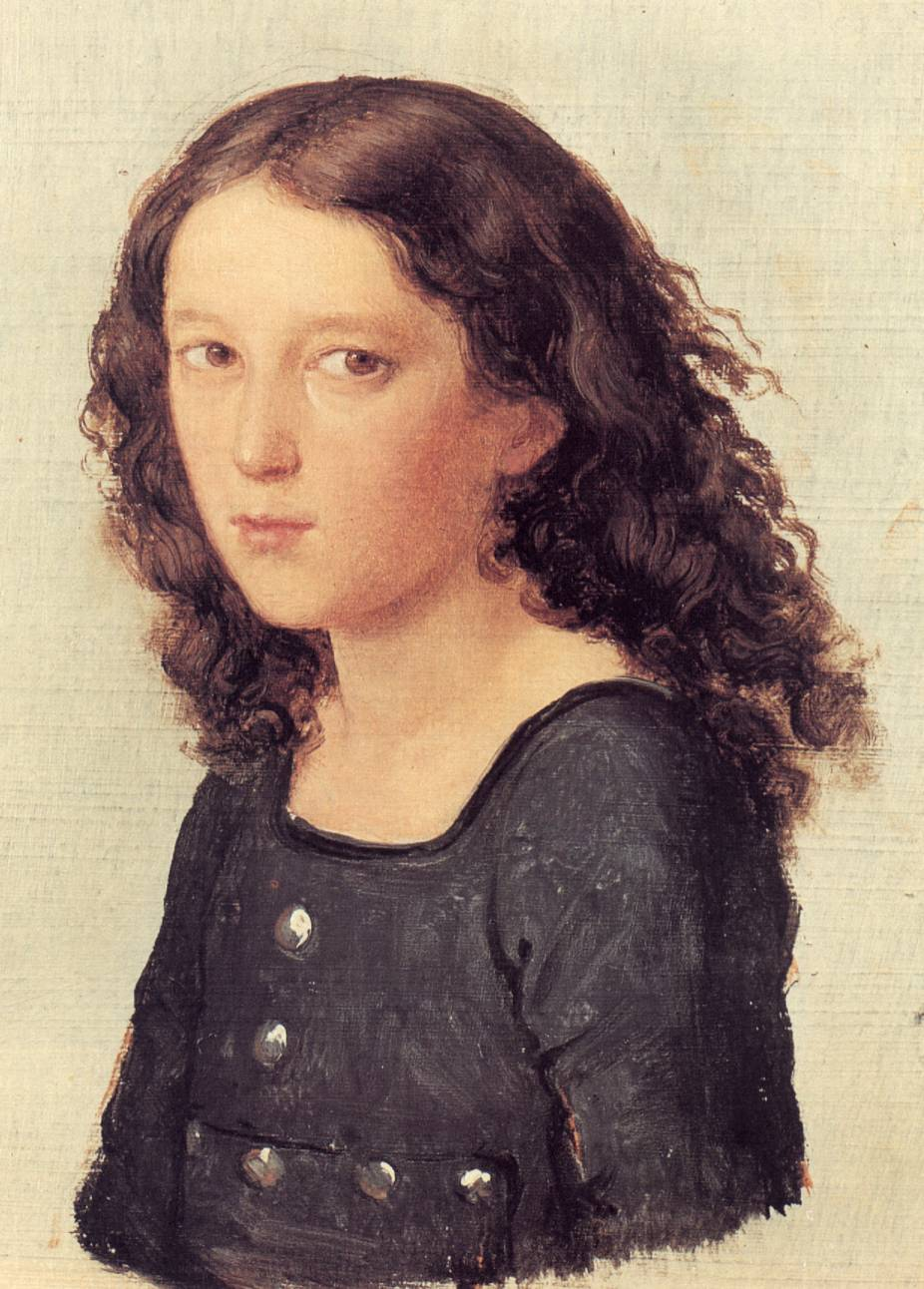
- Mendelssohn in 1821, age 12
- Key: E major
- Catalogue: MWV O 4
- Composed: 1823
- Performed: December 1823
- Movements: 3

The Concerto for Two Pianos and Orchestra in E major was written in the late summer and early fall of 1823 by the young Felix Mendelssohn when he was 14 years old. It was first performed in December 1823 with Felix and his sister Fanny Mendelssohn as the two soloists. Regarded as immature by the composer, the work remained unpublished during his lifetime, though he substantially revised it, perhaps a decade after the première, in which form the Leipziger Ausgabe der Werke Felix Mendelssohn Bartholdy published it in 1961.

== Structure ==
There are three movements:

1. Allegro vivace
2. Adagio non troppo
3. Allegro
