= Festgesang an die Künstler =

Felix Mendelssohn composed the cantata Festgesang an die Künstler, Op. 68, in 1846 as an entry to a German-Flemish song competition, and it was published later that same year. Some sources confuse this Festgesang with one written in 1840 for the Gutenberg Festival at Leipzig, the Festgesang (Gutenberg cantata). The piece is a setting of verses by Friedrich Schiller for a men's choir and 13 brass instruments.
