= String Quartet in E-flat major (1823; Mendelssohn) =

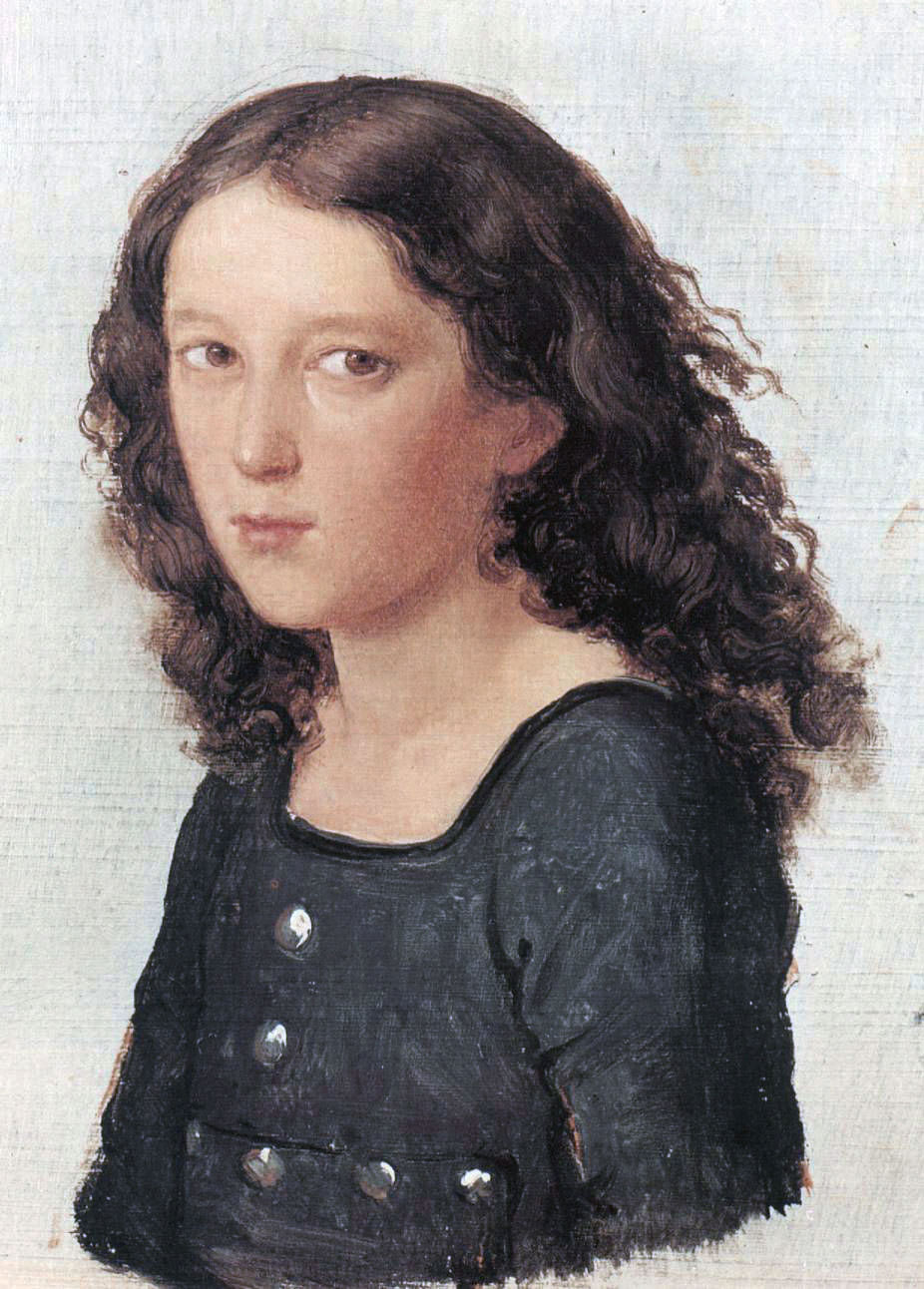
Felix Mendelssohn aged 12 (1821) by Carl Joseph Begas

Felix Mendelssohn's String Quartet in E♭ major is an early work composed in 1823 but not published until 1879. The quartet was not assigned an opus number and is not numbered.

== Movements ==
Like all of Mendelssohn's string quartets, this work has four movements:

1. Allegro moderato
2. Adagio non troppo
3. Menuetto and Trio
4. Fuga

A typical performance lasts just under 24 minutes.
