= Preludes and Fugues, Op. 35 (Mendelssohn) =

Op. 35, No. 1 - Prelude. Allegro con fuoco, MWV U 116

Op. 35, No. 1 - Fugue. Andante espressivo, MWV U 66
Performed by Mutsumi Saiki

Six Preludes and Fugues, Op. 35, is a piano composition by Felix Mendelssohn. Combining freshly composed preludes with several earlier composed fugues, he composed the entire collection in a plan based on alternating minor and major keys (E minor, D major, B minor, A♭ major, F minor, B♭ major). This composition is influenced by Well-Tempered Clavier by Johann Sebastian Bach.
