= Piano Quartet No. 3 (Mendelssohn) =

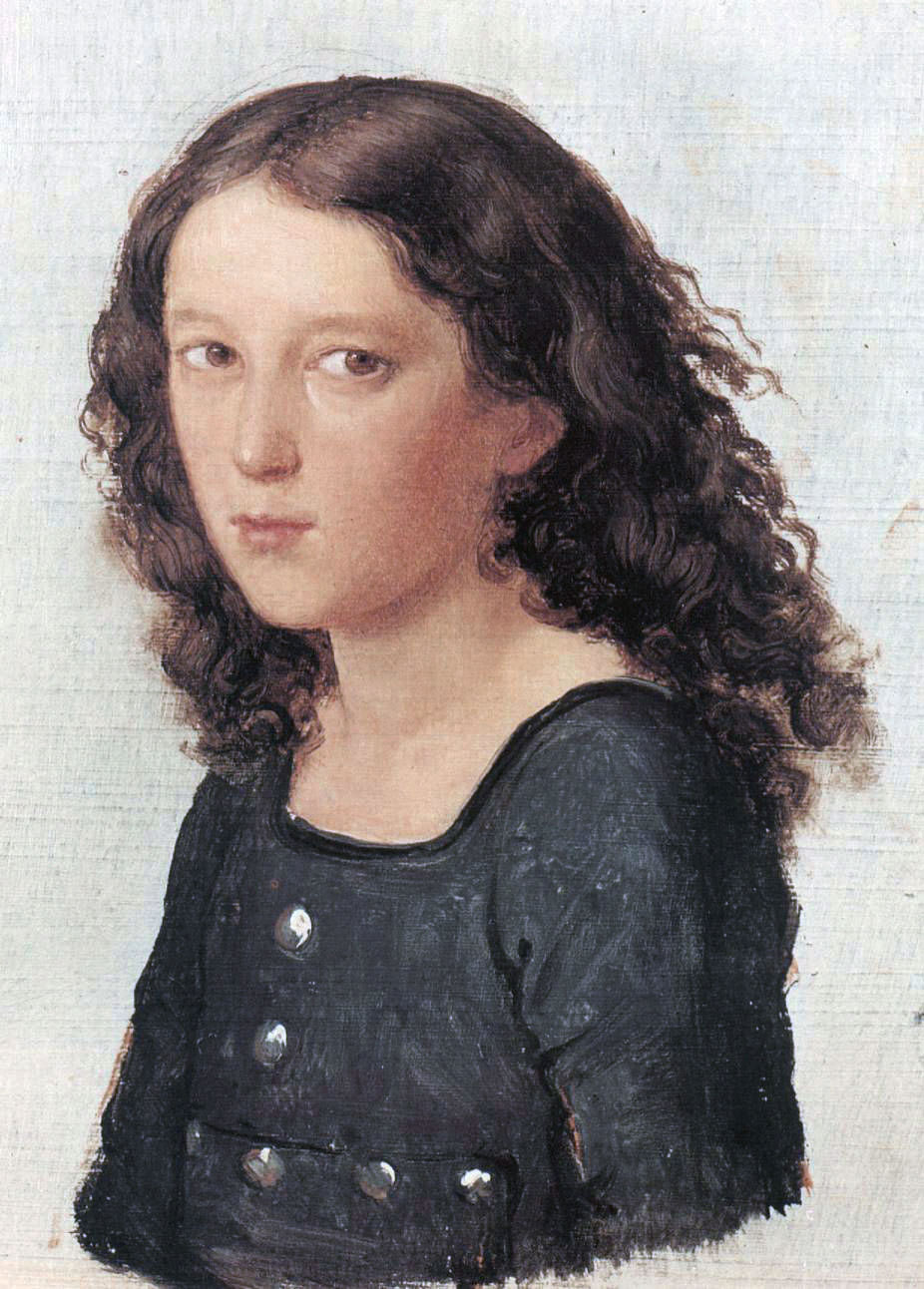
Felix Mendelssohn aged 12 (1821) by Carl Joseph Begas

Felix Mendelssohn began composing his Piano Quartet No. 3 in B minor, Op. 3, for piano, violin, viola and cello in late 1824 and completed it on 18 January 1825, just before his sixteenth birthday. The piano quartet was published later that year and was dedicated to Goethe whom Mendelssohn had met a few years earlier. Mendelssohn's three numbered piano quartets were the first works of his to be published, hence their opus numbers.

== Structure ==
The work has four movements:

1. Allegro molto (B minor, sonata form)
2. Andante (E major, sonata form)
3. Allegro molto (F♯ minor, ternary form, trio in B major)
4. Allegro vivace (B minor, sonata form)

A typical performance lasts just over half an hour.

== Early reception ==
In March 1825, Mendelssohn's father agreed to allow Felix to pursue a career in music, but only if his potential was recognized by professional musicians. Felix brought his Piano Quartet in B minor to the Paris Conservatory, where it was played by director Luigi Cherubini, and by the concertmaster of the Paris Opera, Pierre Baillot. According to Mendelssohn, the musicians were at first careless, but became enthusiastic early in the first movement and, at a terrific speed, played the entire quartet to its conclusion. Baillot approached the young composer after the performance and, without uttering a word, simply embraced him.
