= String Quartet No. 1 (Mendelssohn) =

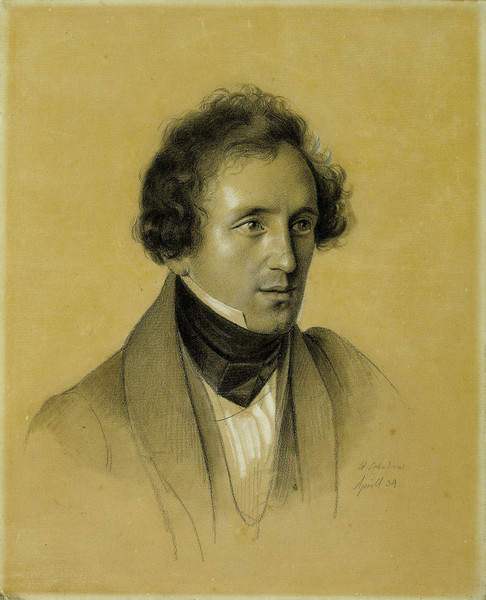
Felix Mendelssohn by Friedrich Wilhelm Schadow, 1834

Felix Mendelssohn's String Quartet No. 1 in E♭ major, Op. 12, was composed in 1829, completed in London on September 14 (though begun in Berlin), and possibly dedicated to Betty Pistor, a neighbor and the daughter of a Berlin astronomer.

== Movements ==
Like all of Mendelssohn's string quartets, this work has four movements:

1. Adagio non troppo – Allegro non tardante
2. Canzonetta: Allegretto, in G minor
3. Andante espressivo, in B♭ major
4. Molto allegro e vivace, in C minor until a return to E♭ major (and the first movement's material) in the coda

A typical performance lasts just under 25 minutes.
