= String Quartet No. 5 (Mendelssohn) =

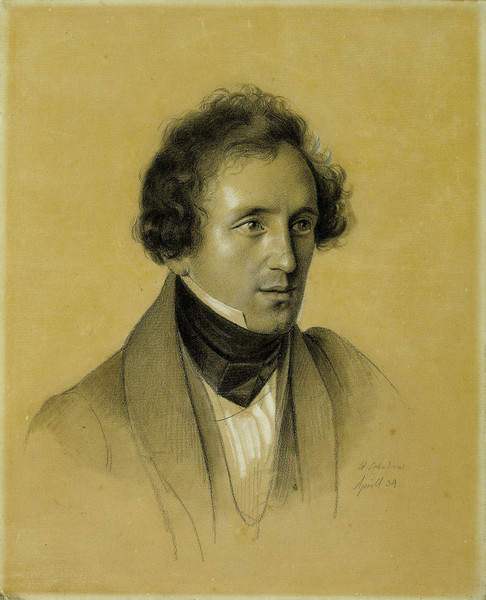
Felix Mendelssohn by Friedrich Wilhelm Schadow, 1834

Felix Mendelssohn's String Quartet No. 5 in E♭ major, Op. 44, No. 3, was composed in 1837–38 and completed on February 6, 1838. The piece is part of the Op. 44 set of three string quartets that Mendelssohn dedicated to the Crown Prince of Sweden.

== Movements ==
Like all of Mendelssohn's string quartets, this work has four movements:

1. Allegro vivace
2. Scherzo: Assai leggiero vivace
3. Adagio non troppo
4. Molto allegro con fuoco

A typical performance lasts around 35 minutes.

Robin Wildstein Garvin has suggested that the slow movement belongs to the 'religious adagio type', deriving from organ pieces that aimed to inspire religious contemplation through a devotional atmosphere. It follows a ternary form with a new theme presented in the B section.
