= Mendelssohn-Werkverzeichnis =

The Mendelssohn-Werkverzeichnis (MWV) (German for Mendelssohn Work Index) is the first modern fully researched music catalogue of the works of Felix Mendelssohn. It appeared in 2009 under the auspices of the Saxon Academy of Sciences and Humanities (SAW) under the leadership of the German music scholar Ralf Wehner, and is published by the firm of Breitkopf & Härtel as part of the "Leipzig Edition of the Works of Felix Mendelssohn Bartholdy".

Mendelssohn himself allocated opus numbers only up to 72 for his published works, with further numbers up to 121 being added posthumously. Moreover, none of Mendelssohn's earlier works including his 13 string symphonies or his operas, had any defined opus numbers. The MWV "conflates the known works into 26 groups and assigns a distinct MWV number to each of the works. Within each group, the works are ordered chronologically."

== See also ==
- List of compositions by Felix Mendelssohn
