= String quintet repertoire =

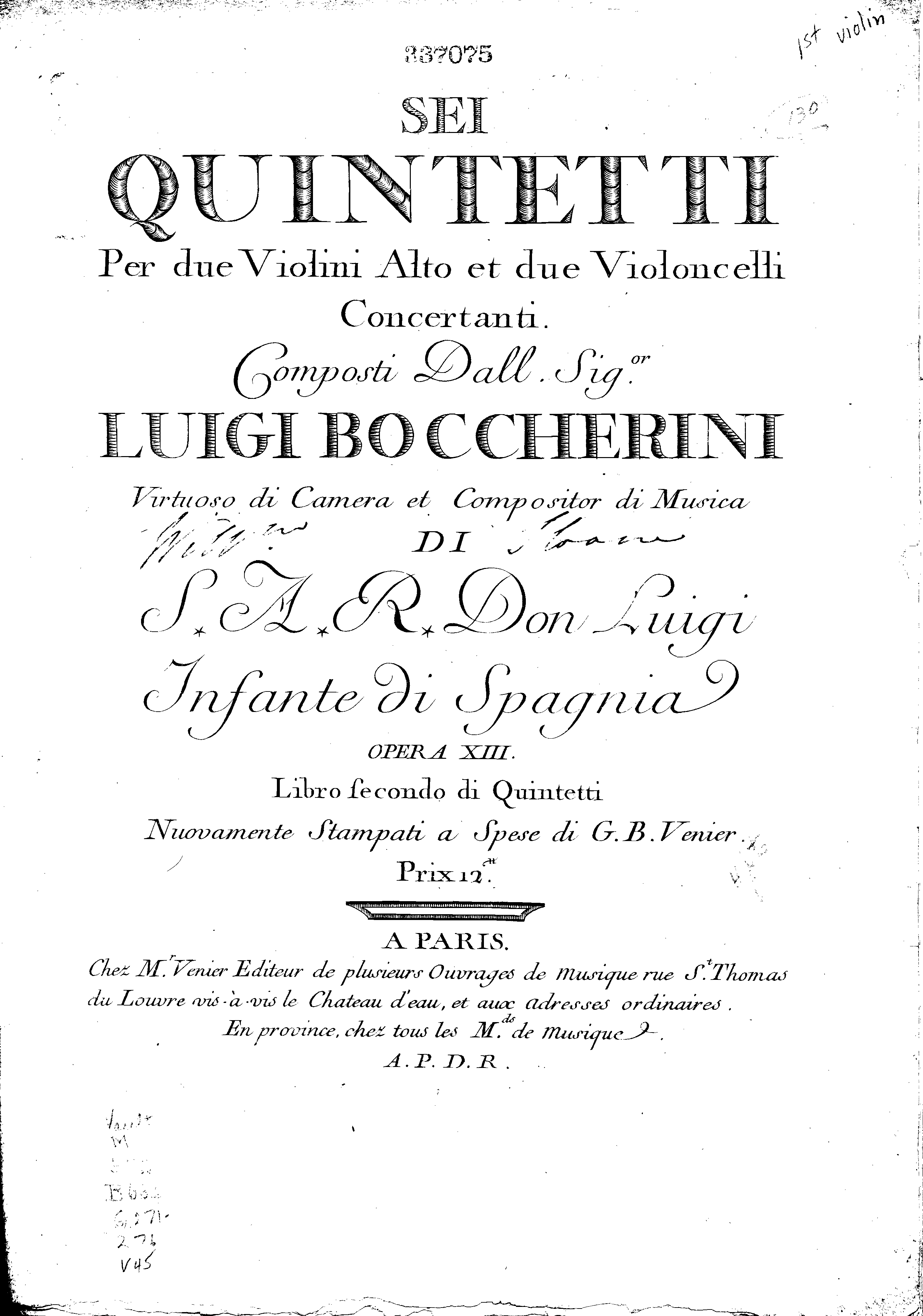
The title page of Boccherini's second set of string quintets, from the 1st edition

The string quintet normally comprises the four instruments of the standard string quartet (2 violins, viola, and cello), plus one additional instrument. This additional instrument may be a viola, cello or double bass. Of these three different combinations, the string quintet with a second viola has the widest repertoire and may be referred to as the standard string quintet. The other two combinations have far fewer important works, though the combination with two cellos includes the string quintet by Schubert, which is widely considered the greatest of all string quintets.

Ordering in each section is by surname of composer. These lists should be complete for major composers and their string quintets. For secondary or minor composers, the lists are not exhaustive but those shown may be taken as representative examples. For recent or living composers, no attempt has been made at completeness.

== "Viola" quintets ==
String quintets with 2 violins, 2 violas and cello

- Arnold Bax (1883–1953)
  - String Quintet in G (1908)
  - Lyrical Interlude (1922)
- Ludwig van Beethoven (1770–1827)
  - String Quintet in E♭, Op. 4 (1792-3; 1795–6)
  - String Quintet in C major, Op. 29 (1801)
  - String Quintet in C minor, Op. 104 (1793-5; 1817)
- Luigi Boccherini (1743–1805)
  - String Quintet Op. 60 No. 1 in C major, G 391 (1801)
  - String Quintet Op. 60 No. 2 in B♭ major, G 392 (1801)
  - String Quintet Op. 60 No. 3 in A major, G 393 (1801)
  - String Quintet Op. 60 No. 4 in E♭ major, G 394 (1801; lost)
  - String Quintet Op. 60 No. 5 in G major, G 395 (1801)
  - String Quintet Op. 60 No. 6 in F major, G 396 (1801)
  - String Quintet Op. 62 No. 1 in C major, G 397 (1802)
  - String Quintet Op. 62 No. 2 in E♭ major, G 398 (1802)
  - String Quintet Op. 62 No. 3 in F major, G 399 (1802)
  - String Quintet Op. 62 No. 4 in B♭ major, G 400 (1802)
  - String Quintet Op. 62 No. 5 in D major, G 401 (1802)
  - String Quintet Op. 62 No. 6 in E major, G 402 (1802)
  - Also 12 further quintets arranged from piano quintets
- Johannes Brahms (1833–1897)
  - String Quintet No. 1 in F major, Op. 88 (1883)
  - String Quintet No. 2 in G major, Op. 111 (1891)
- Frank Bridge (1879–1941)
  - String Quintet in E minor, H 7 (1901)
- Benjamin Britten (1913–1976)
  - Phantasy Quintet (1932)
- Max Bruch (1838–1920)
  - String Quintet No. 1 in A minor (1918)
  - String Quintet No. 2 in E♭ major (1918)
- Anton Bruckner (1824–1896)
  - String Quintet in F major, WAB 112 (1878-9)
  - Intermezzo for String Quintet, WAB 113 (1879)
- Kenji Bunch (1973–)
  - String Circle (2005)
- Franz Danzi (1763–1826)
  - String Quintet in E♭ major, op. 66 no. 1 (1823-4)
  - String Quintet in F minor, op. 66 no. 2 (1823-4)
  - String Quintet in A major, op. 66 no. 3 (1823-4)
- Gaetano Donizetti (1797–1848)
  - Allegro in C major
- Antonín Dvořák (1841–1904)
  - String Quintet in A minor, Op. 1 (1861)
  - String Quintet in E♭ major, Op. 97 (1893)
- François-Joseph Fétis (1784–1871)
  - String Quintet no. 1 in A minor (1860)
  - String Quintet no. 2 (1862)
  - String Quintet no. 3 (1862)
- Niels Gade (1817–1890)
  - String Quintet in E minor, op. 8 (1845)
- Joseph Haydn (1732–1809)
  - Divertimento in G major, Hob.II:2 (c. 1753)
- Michael Haydn (1737–1806)
  - Quintet in C major, MH 187
  - Quintet in B♭ major, MH 412
  - Quintet in F major, MH 367
  - Quintet in F major, MH 411
  - Quintet in G major, MH 189
- Heinrich von Herzogenberg (1843–1900)
  - String Quintet in C minor, op. 77 (1892)
- Felix Mendelssohn (1809–1847)
  - String Quintet No. 1 in A major, op. 18 (1826; 1832)
  - Minuet in F♯ minor (1826)
  - String Quintet No. 2 in B♭ major, op. 87 (1845)
- Wolfgang Amadeus Mozart (1756–1791)
  - String Quintet in B♭, K. 174 (1773)
  - String Quintet in C major, K. 515 (1787)
  - String Quintet in G minor, K. 516 (1787)
  - String Quintet in C minor, K. 406/516b (1782; c. 1788)
  - String Quintet in D major, K. 593 (1790)
  - String Quintet in E♭ major, K. 614 (1791)
- Carl Nielsen (1865–1931)
  - String Quintet in G major, FS 5 (1888)
- George Onslow (1784–1853)
  - Three string quintets
  - Three further string quintets with two versions, either for 2 violins, 2 violas and cello or for 2 violins, viola and 2 cellos
- Sir Hubert Parry (1848–1918)
  - String Quintet in E♭ major (1883-4)
- Anton Reicha (1770–1836)
  - Seven string quintets
- Ferdinand Ries (1784–1838)
  - Five string quintets
- Franz Schubert (1797–1828)
  - Overture in C minor, D. 8 (1811)
- Louis Spohr (1784–1859)
  - Seven string quintets
- Sir Charles Villiers Stanford (1852–1924)
  - String Quintet no. 1 in F major, op. 85 (1903)
  - String Quintet no. 2 in C minor, op. 86 (1903; unpublished)
- Johan Svendsen (1840–1911)
  - String Quintet in C major, Op. 5 (1867)
- Sergey Taneyev (1856–1915)
  - String Quintet no. 2 in C major, Op. 16 (1903-4)
- Ralph Vaughan Williams (1872–1958)
  - Phantasy Quintet (1912)

== "Cello" quintets ==
String quintets with 2 violins, viola and 2 cellos

- David Baker (1931–2016)
  - Two Cello String Quintet (1987) Violoncello and string quartet (Commissioned by Janos Starker)
- Ludwig van Beethoven (1770–1827)
  - Kreutzer Sonata arranged for String Quintet (Simrock, 1832)
- Luigi Boccherini (1743–1805)
  - String Quintet Op. 10 No. 1 in A major, G 265
  - String Quintet Op. 10 No. 2 in E♭ major, G 266
  - String Quintet Op. 10 No. 3 in C minor, G 267
  - String Quintet Op. 10 No. 4 in C major, G 268
  - String Quintet Op. 10 No. 5 in E♭ major, G 269
  - String Quintet Op. 10 No. 6 in D major, G 270
  - String Quintet Op. 11 No. 1 in B♭ major, G 271
  - String Quintet Op. 11 No. 2 in A major, G 272
  - String Quintet Op. 11 No. 3 in C major, G 273
  - String Quintet Op. 11 No. 4 in F minor, G 274
  - String Quintet Op. 11 No. 5 in E major, G 275 (This quintet includes the well-known "Boccherini's Minuet")
  - String Quintet Op. 11 No. 6 in D major ("L'uccelliera" - "Bird Sanctuary"), G 276
  - String Quintet Op. 13 No. 1 in E♭ major, G 277
  - String Quintet Op. 13 No. 2 in C major, G 278
  - String Quintet Op. 13 No. 3 in F major, G 279
  - String Quintet Op. 13 No. 4 in D minor, G 280
  - String Quintet Op. 13 No. 5 in A major, G 281
  - String Quintet Op. 13 No. 6 in E major, G 282
  - String Quintet Op. 18 No. 1 in C minor, G 283
  - String Quintet Op. 18 No. 2 in D major, G 284
  - String Quintet Op. 18 No. 3 in E♭ major, G 285
  - String Quintet Op. 18 No. 4 in C major, G 286
  - String Quintet Op. 18 No. 5 in D minor, G 287
  - String Quintet Op. 18 No. 6 in E major, G 288
  - String Quintet Op. 20 No. 1 in E♭ major, G 289
  - String Quintet Op. 20 No. 2 in B♭ major, G 290
  - String Quintet Op. 20 No. 3 in F major, G 291
  - String Quintet Op. 20 No. 4 in G major, G 292
  - String Quintet Op. 20 No. 5 in D minor, G 293
  - String Quintet Op. 20 No. 6 in A minor, G 294
  - String Quintet Op. 25 No. 1 in D minor, G 295
  - String Quintet Op. 25 No. 2 in E♭ major, G 296
  - String Quintet Op. 25 No. 3 in A major, G 297
  - String Quintet Op. 25 No. 4 in C major, G 298
  - String Quintet Op. 25 No. 5 in D major, G 299
  - String Quintet Op. 25 No. 6 in A minor, G 300
  - String Quintet Op. 27 No. 1 in A major, G 301
  - String Quintet Op. 27 No. 2 in G major, G 302
  - String Quintet Op. 27 No. 3 in E minor, G 303
  - String Quintet Op. 27 No. 4 in E♭ major, G 304
  - String Quintet Op. 27 No. 5 in G minor, G 305
  - String Quintet Op. 27 No. 6 in B minor, G 306
  - String Quintet Op. 28 No. 1 in F major, G 307
  - String Quintet Op. 28 No. 2 in A major, G 308
  - String Quintet Op. 28 No. 3 in E♭ major, G 309
  - String Quintet Op. 28 No. 4 in C major, G 310
  - String Quintet Op. 28 No. 5 in D minor, G 311
  - String Quintet Op. 28 No. 6 in B♭ major, G 312
  - String Quintet Op. 29 No. 1 in D major, G 313
  - String Quintet Op. 29 No. 2 in C minor, G 314
  - String Quintet Op. 29 No. 3 in F major, G 315
  - String Quintet Op. 29 No. 4 in A major, G 316
  - String Quintet Op. 29 No. 5 in E♭ major, G 317
  - String Quintet Op. 29 No. 6 in G minor, G 318
  - String Quintet Op. 30 No. 1 in B♭ major, G 319
  - String Quintet Op. 30 No. 2 in A minor, G 320
  - String Quintet Op. 30 No. 3 in C major, G 321
  - String Quintet Op. 30 No. 4 in E♭ major, G 322
  - String Quintet Op. 30 No. 5 in E minor, G 323
  - String Quintet Op. 30 No. 6 in C major ("Musica notturna delle strade di Madrid"), G 324
  - String Quintet Op. 31 No. 1 in E♭ major, G 325
  - String Quintet Op. 31 No. 2 in G major, G 326
  - String Quintet Op. 31 No. 3 in B♭ major, G 327
  - String Quintet Op. 31 No. 4 in C minor, G 328
  - String Quintet Op. 31 No. 5 in A major, G 329
  - String Quintet Op. 31 No. 6 in F major, G 330
  - String Quintet Op. 36 No. 1 in E♭ major, G 331
  - String Quintet Op. 36 No. 2 in D major, G 332
  - String Quintet Op. 36 No. 3 in G major, G 333
  - String Quintet Op. 36 No. 4 in A minor, G 334
  - String Quintet Op. 36 No. 5 in G minor, G 335
  - String Quintet Op. 36 No. 6 in F major, G 336
  - String Quintet Op. 39 No. 1 in B♭ major, G 337
  - String Quintet Op. 39 No. 2 in F major, G 338
  - String Quintet Op. 39 No. 3 in D major, G 339
  - String Quintet Op. 40 No. 1 in A major, G 340
  - String Quintet Op. 40 No. 2 in D major, G 341
  - String Quintet Op. 40 No. 3 in D major, G 342
  - String Quintet Op. 40 No. 4 in C major, G 343
  - String Quintet Op. 40 No. 5 in E minor, G 344
  - String Quintet Op. 40 No. 6 in B♭ major, G 345
  - String Quintet Op. 41 No. 1 in E♭ major, G 346
  - String Quintet Op. 41 No. 2 in F major, G 347
  - String Quintet Op. 42 No. 1 in F minor, G 348
  - String Quintet Op. 42 No. 2 in C major, G 349
  - String Quintet Op. 42 No. 3 in B minor, G 350
  - String Quintet Op. 42 No. 4 in G minor, G 351
  - String Quintet Op. 43 No. 1 in E♭ major, G 352
  - String Quintet Op. 43 No. 2 in D major, G 353
  - String Quintet Op. 43 No. 3 in F major, G 354
  - String Quintet Op. 45 No. 1 in C minor, G 355
  - String Quintet Op. 45 No. 2 in A major, G 356
  - String Quintet Op. 45 No. 3 in B♭ major, G 357
  - String Quintet Op. 45 No. 4 in C major, G 358
  - String Quintet Op. 46 No. 1 in B♭ major, G 359
  - String Quintet Op. 46 No. 2 in D minor, G 360
  - String Quintet Op. 46 No. 3 in C major, G 361
  - String Quintet Op. 46 No. 4 in G minor, G 362
  - String Quintet Op. 46 No. 5 in F major, G 363
  - String Quintet Op. 46 No. 6 in E♭ major, G 364
  - String Quintet Op. 49 No. 1 in D major, G 365
  - String Quintet Op. 49 No. 2 in B♭ major, G 366
  - String Quintet Op. 49 No. 3 in E♭ major, G 367
  - String Quintet Op. 49 No. 4 in D minor, G 368
  - String Quintet Op. 49 No. 5 in E♭ major, G 369
  - String Quintet Op. 50 No. 1 in A major, G 370
  - String Quintet Op. 50 No. 2 in E♭ major, G 371
  - String Quintet Op. 50 No. 3 in B♭ major, G 372
  - String Quintet Op. 50 No. 4 in E major, G 373
  - String Quintet Op. 50 No. 5 in C major, G 374
  - String Quintet Op. 50 No. 6 in B♭ major, G 375
  - String Quintet Op. 51 No. 1 in E♭ major, G 376
  - String Quintet Op. 51 No. 2 in C minor, G 377
  - String Quintet in C major, G 378
  - String Quintet in E minor (from G 407), G 379
  - String Quintet in F major (from G 408), G 380
  - String Quintet in E♭ major (from G 410), G 381
  - String Quintet in A minor (from G 412), G 382
  - String Quintet in D major (from G 411), G 383
  - String Quintet in C major (from G 409), G 384
  - String Quintet in D minor (from G 416), G 385
  - String Quintet in E minor (from G 417), G 386
  - String Quintet in B♭ major (from G 414), G 387
  - String Quintet in A major (from G 413), G 388
  - String Quintet in E minor (from G 415), G 389
  - String Quintet in C major (from G 418), G 390
  - String Quintet Op. 60 No. 1 in C major, G 391
  - String Quintet Op. 60 No. 2 in B♭ major, G 392
  - String Quintet Op. 60 No. 3 in A major, G 393
  - String Quintet Op. 60 No. 4 in E♭ major (lost), G 394
  - String Quintet Op. 60 No. 5 in G major, G 395
  - String Quintet Op. 60 No. 6 in E major, G 396
  - String Quintet Op. 62 No. 1 in C major, G 397
  - String Quintet Op. 62 No. 2 in E♭ major, G 398
  - String Quintet Op. 62 No. 3 in F major, G 399
  - String Quintet Op. 62 No. 4 in B♭ major, G 400
  - String Quintet Op. 62 No. 5 in D major, G 401
  - String Quintet Op. 62 No. 6 in E major, G 402
  - String Quintet in E♭ major (lost), G 406
  - Also: "String Quintet in C major" put together by Johann Lauterbach (1832-1918) from unrelated Boccherini string quintet movements
- Aleksandr Borodin (1833–1887)
  - String Quintet in F minor (1853-4: unfinished; completed by O. Evlakhov)
- Luigi Cherubini (1760–1842)
  - String Quintet in E minor (1837)
- Carl Ditters von Dittersdorf (1739–99)
  - Six string quintets
- Henry Eccles (1670–1742)
  - Sonata in G minor for cello and strings
    (This is actually a sonata for viola da gamba and figured bass and not a string quintet. The version for cello and strings is a transcription. This sonata is also often played in a transcription for cello and piano.)
- Aleksandr Glazunov (1865–1936)
  - String Quintet in A major, Op. 39 (1891-2)
- Karl Goldmark (1820–1915)
  - String Quintet in A minor, Op. 9 (1862)
- Jay Greenberg (1991–)
  - String Quintet (2005)
- August Klughardt (1847–1902)
  - String Quintet (c. 1890)
- George Onslow (1784–1853)
  - Twenty-two string quintets
  - Three further string quintets with two versions, either for 2 violins, viola and 2 cellos or for 2 violins, 2 violas and cello
- Anton Reicha (1770–1836)
  - Three string quintets
- George Rochberg (1918–2005)
  - Quintet (1982)
- Franz Schubert (1797–1828)
  - Quintet in C major, D. 956, Op. 163 (1828)
- Peter Seabourne (1960–)
  - String Quintet
- Adrien-François Servais (1807–1866)
  - Souvenir de Spa for cello and strings
- Ethel Smyth (1858–1944)
  - String Quintet in E major, Op. 1 (1884)
- Sergey Taneyev (1856–1915)
  - String Quintet no. 1 in G major, Op. 14 (1900–01)
- Alex Weiser (1989–)
  - Airs of Awe and Affection (2026)

== "Double bass" quintets ==
String quintets with two violins, viola, cello and double bass

- Luigi Boccherini (1743–1805)
  - String Quintet Op. 39 No. 1 in B♭ major, G 337 (1787)
  - String Quintet Op. 39 No. 2 in F major, G 338 (1787)
  - String Quintet Op. 39 No. 3 in D major, G 339 (1787)
- Carl Ditters von Dittersdorf (1739–99)
  - Six string quintets (with non-obbligato horns)
- Antonín Dvořák (1841–1904)
  - String Quintet in G major, Op. 77 (1875)
- Alistair Hinton (1950–)
  - String Quintet (1969–77)
- George Onslow (1784–1853)
  - Six string quintets
- Alex Weiser (1989–)
  - Airs of Awe and Affection (2026)

== See also ==
- String instrument repertoire

== Sources ==
- Grove Music Online
- Jeffery, Paul 'A Player's Guide to Chamber Music' (Robert Hale, 2017)
