= List of string quintets by Wolfgang Amadeus Mozart =

This is a list of string quintets by Wolfgang Amadeus Mozart. All are viola quintets, that is, they are scored for string quartet (two violins, viola and cello), and an additional viola .

- String Quintet No. 1 in B♭ major, K. 174
- String Quintet No. 2 in C minor, K. 406/516b
- String Quintet No. 3 in C major, K. 515
- String Quintet No. 4 in G minor, K. 516
- String Quintet No. 5 in D major, K. 593
- String Quintet No. 6 in E♭ major, K. 614
