= String Quintet No. 1 =

String Quintet No. 1 may refer to:

- String Quintet No. 1 (Brahms)
- String Quintet No. 1 (Dvořák)
- String Quintet No. 1 (Mendelssohn)
- String Quintet No. 1 (Mozart)
