= String Quintet No. 2 =

String Quintet No. 2 may refer to:

- String Quintet No. 2 (Brahms)
- String Quintet No. 2 (Dvořák)
- String Quintet No. 2 (Mendelssohn)
- String Quintet No. 2 (Mozart)
