= String quintet =

Musical piece for five string players

Typical layout

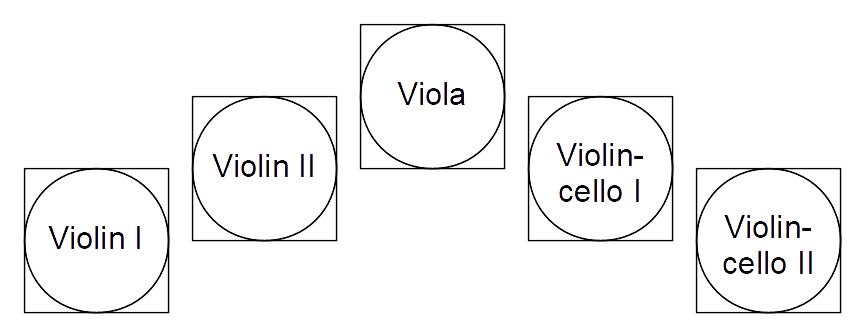
Cello quintet

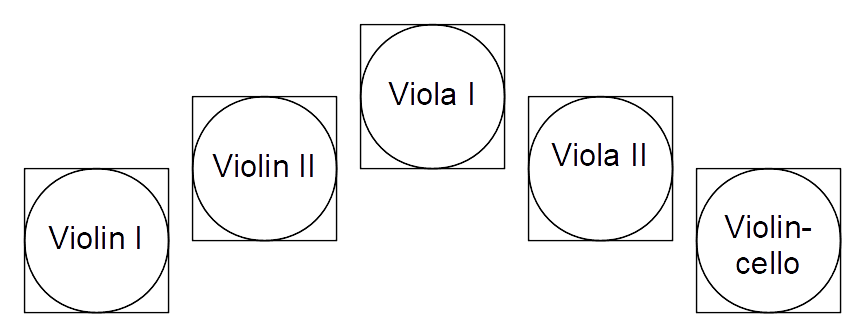
Viola quintet

String quintet op. 27 No. 3 G303 Mvt2 (last) Minuetto by Luigi Boccherini, arranged for violin and harmonium

A string quintet is a musical ensemble of five string players. The name can also apply to any composition for the ensemble. String quintets were common in 17th century Italy and can be found as early as 1607 in Claudio Monteverdi's opera, L'Orfeo.

String quintets add one instrument to the string quartet, which usually comprises two violins, a viola, and a cello. When the viola is the fifth instrument, the ensemble is sometimes called a viola quintet, and likewise for a cello quintet. A double bass can also be the fifth voice in the ensemble.

Notable examples of classic viola quintets in four movement form include those of Wolfgang Amadeus Mozart. Other examples were written by composers including Johannes Brahms and Felix Mendelssohn.

A famous cello quintet is Franz Schubert's Quintet in C major. Antonín Dvořák's Quintet Op. 77 uses a double bass, and Mozart's famous Eine kleine Nachtmusik may be performed with this instrumentation (the double bass being optional).

Alternative additions to a string quartet include clarinet or piano (see clarinet quintet, piano quintet). A more unusual form of string quintet is the violin quintet composed of 3 violins, a viola and a cello (thus, a string quartet with an additional violin). Besides string quartets and quintets, other closely related chamber music genres include the string trio, and the string sextet.

== List of viola quintets ==
- Johann Georg Albrechtsberger – 19 String Quintets called "Sonatas" (1782–1803)
- Franz Joseph Aumann – String Quintet "Divertimento" in C major (c.1760)
- Arnold Bax – Quintet (1933)
- Frank Bridge – Quintet in E minor (H15, 1901)
- Ludwig van Beethoven – Quintet, Op. 29, sometimes called the Storm Quintet; a Fugue in D major for viola quintet, Op. 137; an arrangement of his Octet for Viola Quintet, Op. 4 (the original Octet was later published as Op.103); an arrangement of his Piano Trio Op. 1 No. 3 for Viola Quintet, Op. 104
- Luigi Boccherini – twelve original Quintets, arrangements of all twelve of his Piano Quintets (Op.56 and Op.57) for Viola Quintet.
- Johannes Brahms – two Quintets, Op. 88 and Op. 111; the first edition of the Clarinet Quintet Op. 115 included an alternate part for viola substituting for the clarinet
- Max Bruch – Quintet in A minor
- Anton Bruckner – String Quintet in F major (1879); Intermezzo in D minor (substitute for the scherzo)
- Carson Cooman – Quintet (Unquiet Parables, 2009), Op 856
- Brett Dean – Epitaph for string quintet (2010)
- Antonín Dvořák – two Quintets, No. 1 in A minor and No. 3 in E♭ (the American Quintet)
- Victor Ewald – a Quintet Op. 4 in A major
- Eduard Franck – two Quintets, Op. 15 in E minor and Op. 51 in C Major
- Florian Leopold Gassmann – Op. 2 six String Quintets H 501–506 (1772)
- Friedrich Gernsheim – Quintet Op. 9 in D
- Roy Harris – Quintet (1940)
- Franz Joseph Haydn – Hob.II:2 Divertimento in G major (c.1754)
- Heinrich von Herzogenberg – Quintet in C minor, Op.77 (1892)
- Franz Anton Hoffmeister Op. 2 six Quintets (c.1782)
- Klaus Huber – Ecce homines (1998)
- Heinrich Kaminski – Quintet in F♯ minor (two versions, first 1916)
- Franz Krommer – fifteen String Quintets
- Johann Michael Malzat six String Quintets in F, G, B, A, E♭, C major
- Bohuslav Martinů – Quintet (1927)
- Felix Mendelssohn – two Quintets: No. 1 in A major, Op. 18 (1826, revised 1832) and No. 2 in B♭ major, Op.87 (1845)
- Ernst Mielck – Quintet in F major (1897)
- Darius Milhaud – Quintet Op. 325 (1953–1954)
- Wolfgang Amadeus Mozart – six Quintets: K174, K406/516b, K515, K516, K593, K614
- Carl Nielsen – Quintet in G major (1888)
- George Onslow – five out of his thirty-four Quintets are with two violas; four are with double bass and the rest with two cellos (see below)
- Hubert Parry – Quintet in E♭ (1909)
- George Perle – Quintet (1958)
- Josef Rheinberger – Quintet in A minor, Op. 82 (1874) (Carus-Verlag)
- Ferdinand Ries – Seven Quintets, Op. 37 in C, Op. 68 in D minor, Op. 167 in A minor, Op. 171 in G, Op. 183 in E♭, and two published without opus in A major and F minor (published in a series "Samtliche Streichquintette" edited by Jürgen Schmidt between 2003-5 for Accolade Musikverlag.)
- Franz Schubert – "Quintet-Overture" for Quintet, D 8
- Roger Sessions – Quintet (1958)
- Robert Simpson – Quintet (1987)
- Louis Spohr – seven Quintets
- Charles Villiers Stanford – Two Quintets, Op. 85 & Op.86
- Johan Svendsen – Quintet in C, Op. 5 (1868)
- Sergei Taneyev – Quintet in C, Op. 16
- Johann Baptist Wanhal – Six String Quintets (1774)
- Ralph Vaughan Williams – Quintet (the Phantasy Quintet – 1912) and Nocturne and Scherzo (1904–1906)
- Felix Weingartner – Quintet, his Op. 40
- Ermanno Wolf-Ferrari - Quintet in C, Op. 24 (1939)
- John Woolrich – The Death of King Renaud (1991)
- Alexander von Zemlinsky – Quintet (1894–1896): 2 movements are lost

== List of cello quintets ==
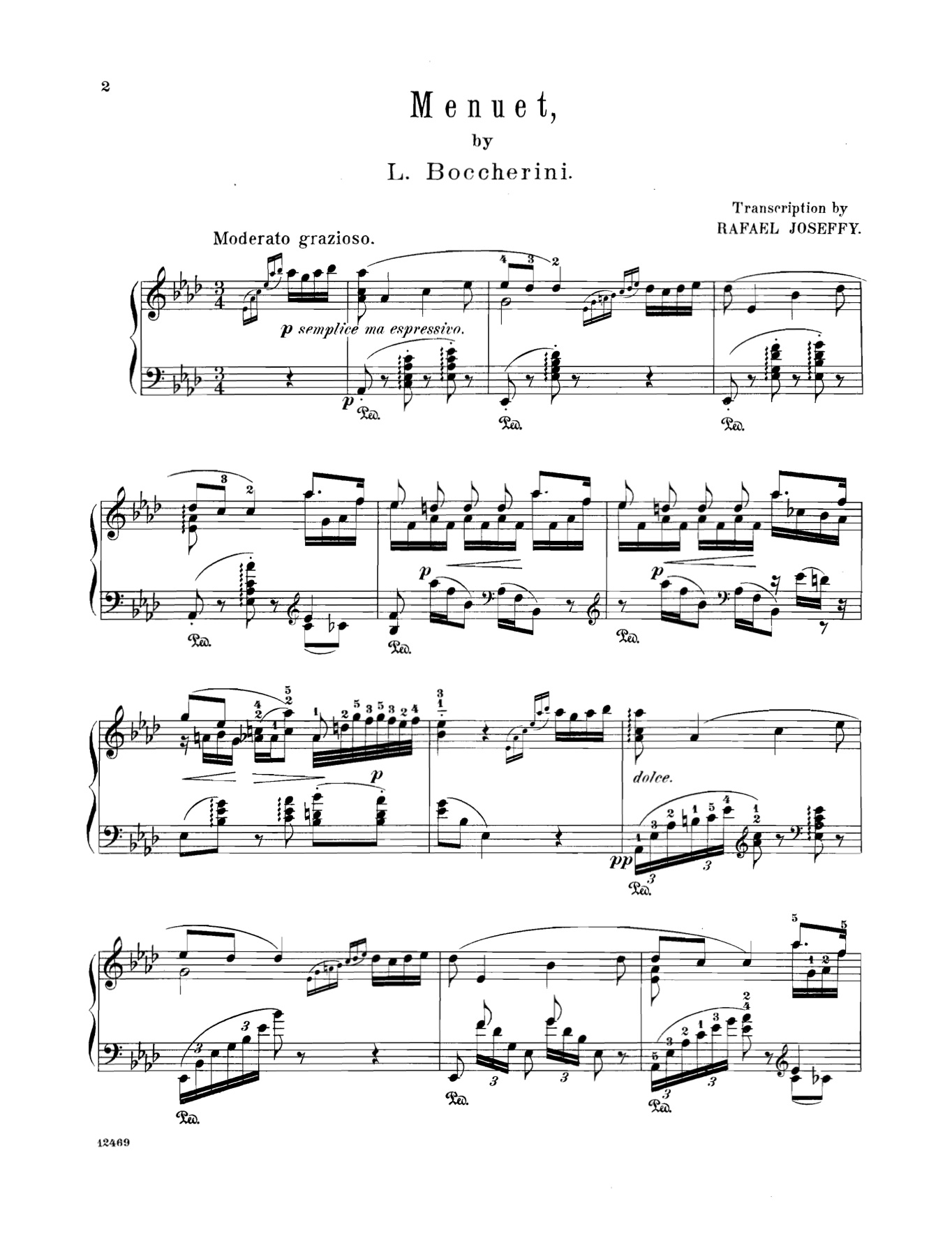
Sheet music for a piano arrangement of the celebrated string quintet in E (an example of a 'cello quintet') by Luigi Boccherini

- Arnold Bax – Quintet in G major (1908), the second movement of which was rescored by the composer for Viola Quintet and published as the Lyrical Interlude (1923);
- Wilhelm Berger – Quintet in E minor, Op. 75 (1911)
- Luigi Boccherini – one hundred and ten Quintets. The third movement Minuet of the Cello Quintet Op.11 No.5 is extremely well known.
- Alexander Borodin – Quintet in F minor (1859–1860)
- Luigi Cherubini – Quintet in E minor (1837)
- Felix Otto Dessoff – Quintet, Op. 10
- Friedrich Dotzauer – Quintet in D minor, Op. 134 (1835)
- Felix Draeseke – Quintet in F, Op. 77 (1901)
- Friedrich Gernsheim – Quintet Op. 89 in E♭
- Alexander Glazunov – Quintet in A, Op. 39 (1892)
- Karl Goldmark – Quintet in A minor, Op. 9 (1862)
- Theodore Gouvy – Quintet in G, op 55 is on IMSLP
- August Klughardt – Quintet in G minor, Op. 62 (1902)
- Frank Martin – Pavane couleur du temps (Colour of weather Pavane), 1920, 7', For quintet.
- Darius Milhaud – Quintet Op. 350 (1956)
- George Onslow – twenty-five of his thirty-four string quintets are Cello Quintets; five are with two violas and four are with double bass
- Einojuhani Rautavaara – Quintet "Les Cieux Inconnues" (Unknown Heavens, 1997)
- Ottorino Respighi – Quintet in G minor (1901, incomplete)
- Wolfgang Rihm – Epilog (2013)
- George Rochberg – Quintet for Two Violins, Viola and Two Cellos (1982)
- Franz Schubert – Cello Quintet, Op. post. 163, D 956
- Peter Seabourne – Quintet for Two Violins, Viola and Two Cellos (2012)
- Robert Simpson – Quintet (1995)
- Ethel Smyth – Quintet in E major, Op. 1
- Sergei Taneyev – Quintet in G, Op. 14 (1900–1901)
- Ferdinand Thieriot – Streich-Quintett G-Dur, 1914; others with wind instruments
- Carl Vine – String Quintet (2009)
- Alex Weiser — Airs of Awe and Affection (2026)

== String quintets for 3 violins, viola and cello ==
- Johann Georg Albrechtsberger, String Quintet (1798)
- Franz Clement, Introduction and Polonaise in E major (Polonaise für die Violine mit Begleitung von 2 Violinen, Viola und Violonzello)
- Heinrich Wilhelm Ernst, Polonaise, Op.17
- Morton Feldman, Violin and String Quartet (1985)
- Charles Martin Loeffler – one Violin Quintet (three violins, viola and cello)
- Joseph Mayseder, Polonaise No.1, Op.10; Polonaise No.3, Op.12
- Alessandro Rolla, Divertimento for Violin and String Quartet, BI 429
- Franz Schubert, Rondo in A major for Violin and Strings, D 438
- Louis Spohr, Potpourri No.2 in B♭ major (Potpourri on themes by Mozart for violin and string quartet (with bass ad libitum))

== List of double bass quintets ==
- Leslie Bassett – Quintet (1957)
- Luigi Boccherini – three Quintets.
- Antonín Dvořák – Quintet Op. 77 in G (1875)
- Brian Ferneyhough – Christus Resurgens (2017)
- Alistair Hinton – String Quintet (1969–77)
- Vagn Holmboe – Quintet, Op. 165/M.326 (1986)
- Darius Milhaud – Quintet Op. 316
- Wolfgang Amadeus Mozart - Serenade No. 13, K. 525, "Eine kleine Nachtmusik"
- George Onslow – four out of his thirty-four String Quintets are with double bass; five with two violas and the rest with two cellos
- Robert Paterson – I See You (2015) (for string quintet with double bass and recording)
- Alex Weiser — Airs of Awe and Affection (2026)

== String quintets for other combinations ==
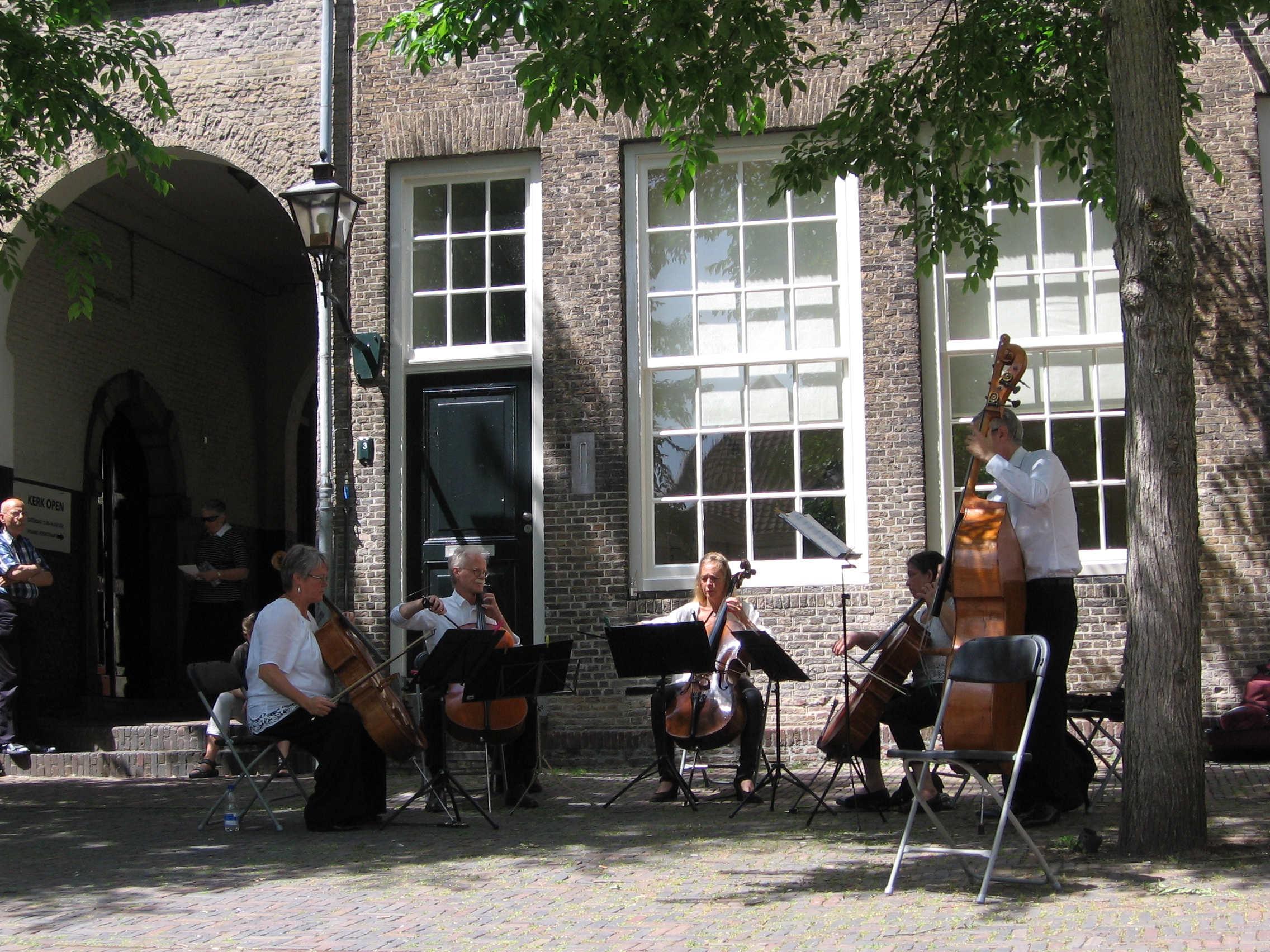
An unusual string quintet (De Zagerij Pro) consisting of four cellos and a double bass, Hof, Dordrecht, the Netherlands, 2019

- Felix Draeseke – one Quintet in A for Two Violins, Viola, Violotta, and Cello (the Stelzner-Quintett; 1897); Draeseke also composed one Cello Quintet- in F, Op. 77 (1901)

== Works making use of a string quintet ==
- Nigel Keay – one Double Bass Quintet with Contralto, Tango Suite (2002)

== See also ==
- String quintet repertoire
