= Op. 88 =

In music, Op. 88 stands for Opus number 88. Compositions that are assigned this number include:

- Brahms – String Quintet No. 1
- Bruch – Concerto for Clarinet, Viola, and Orchestra
- Bruch – Concerto for Two Pianos and Orchestra
- Dvořák – Symphony No. 8
- Elgar/Payne – Symphony No. 3
- Schumann – Fantasiestücke for piano trio
