= Serenade No. 12 (Mozart) =

Composition by Wolfgang Amadeus Mozart

- Nacht Musique
- by W. A. Mozart
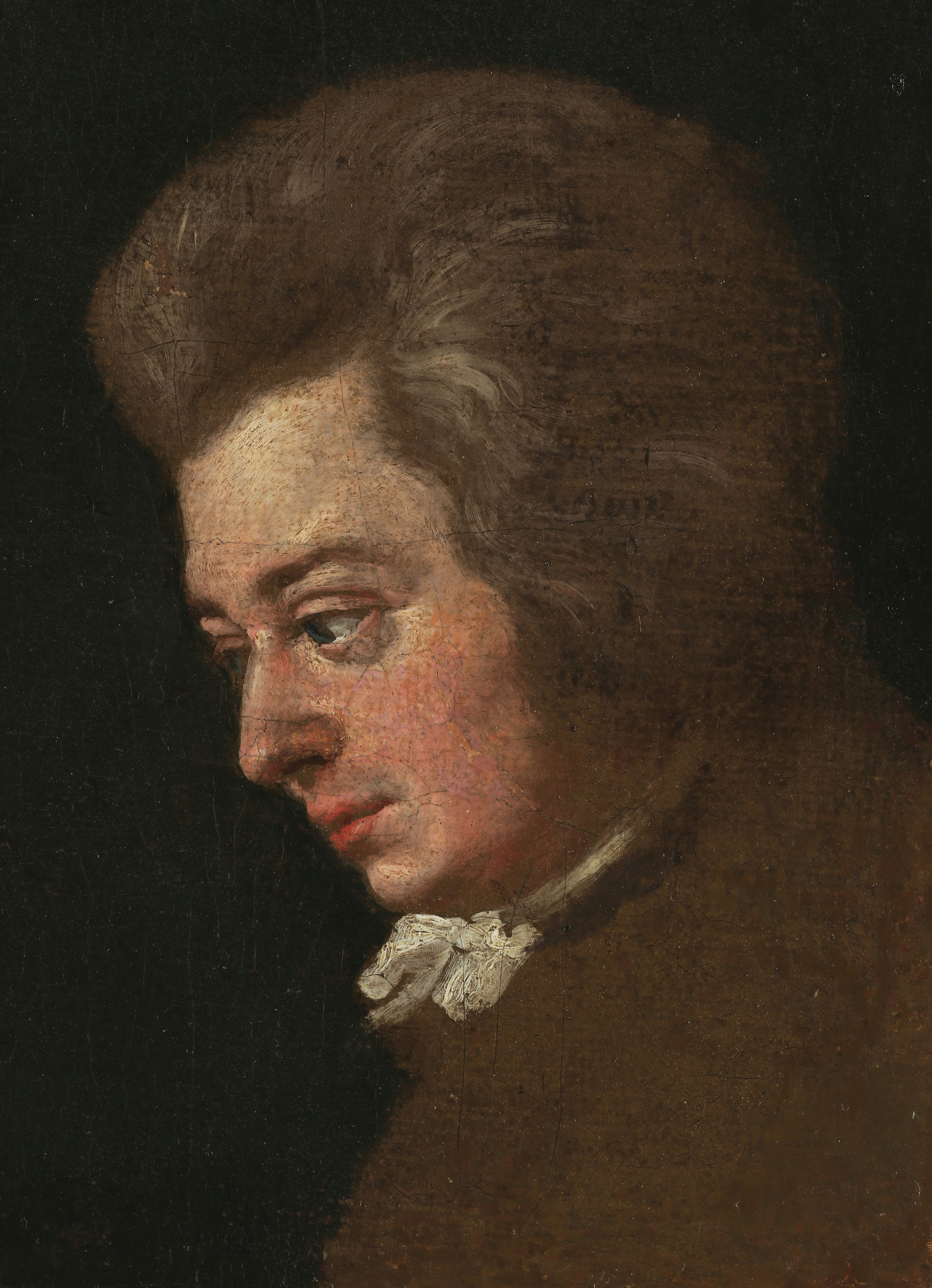
- Detail of Lange's 1782–83 Mozart portrait
- Key: C minor
- Catalogue: K. 388/384a
- Composed: 1782/83
- Duration: ca. 25 minutes
- Movements: 4
- Scoring: two oboes; two clarinets; two horns; two bassoons

The Serenade No. 12 for winds in C minor, K. 388/384a, was written by Wolfgang Amadeus Mozart in 1782 or 1783. It is an unusual work – Roger Hellyer describes it as flying in the face of convention, 'a curiously sombre and powerful work which often conveys a mood of dramatic intensity'. He draws attention to its constant focus on the minor key, the ingenious canonic devices in the third movement, and the 'dramatically cumulative effect of the marvellous set of variations that form the finale'.

In 1787, Mozart transcribed the work as the String Quintet, K. 406/516b.

== Instrumentation ==
The serenade is scored for 2 oboes, 2 clarinets, 2 French horns, and 2 bassoons.

== Structure ==
There are four movements:

1. Allegro, C minor, sonata form
2. Andante, E♭ major, sonata form
3. Menuet & Trio, C minor, Trio in C major, ternary form
4. Allegro, C minor, ends in C major, variation form with the fifth variation (in E♭ major) augmented.

The minuet is a canon. The oboes carry the melody with the bassoons answering one bar later. The trio is also canonic with the response to the melody played upside down. The finale is a set of variations containing a central episode in E♭ major and a coda that turns to C major near the end.

== Unique attributes ==
Serenade No. 12 sets itself apart from the serenades and divertimenti of the period, including Mozart's own, in a number of ways - the most notable of which being the use of a minor key for three of the four movements. Having only four movements, rather than the five or more that would be expected in a serenade, is also unusual. A. Peter Brown classes it with Mozart's works in the Sturm und Drang style – a powerfully expressive style that rears its head in passages, movements, arias and cycles throughout the second half of the eighteenth century. Its uniqueness derives from the use of this serious style and form used in a genre normally associated with pleasant entertainment.

== Instrumentation and Other Versions ==
This serenade was originally composed for a Harmonie of eight wind instruments consisting of pairs of bassoons, clarinets, oboes, and horns. Although Emperor Joseph II was not the first to establish a Harmonie in Vienna, the formation of the Imperial-Royal ensemble in 1782 helped to popularise this type of ensemble. Whether or not Mozart composed this serenade for the imperial ensemble, or another in Vienna, is yet to be studied.

Mozart went on to transcribe the serenade for string quintet (No. 2 in C minor, K.406).

== Nickname ==
The nickname "Nacht Musique" is likely to be Mozart's own, an unusual blend of French and German. It is based on his own notes of wind band music (Harmoniemusik) being popular for evening entertainment during his lifetime.
