= String Quintet, Op. 29 (Beethoven) =

String quintet by Ludwig van Beethoven

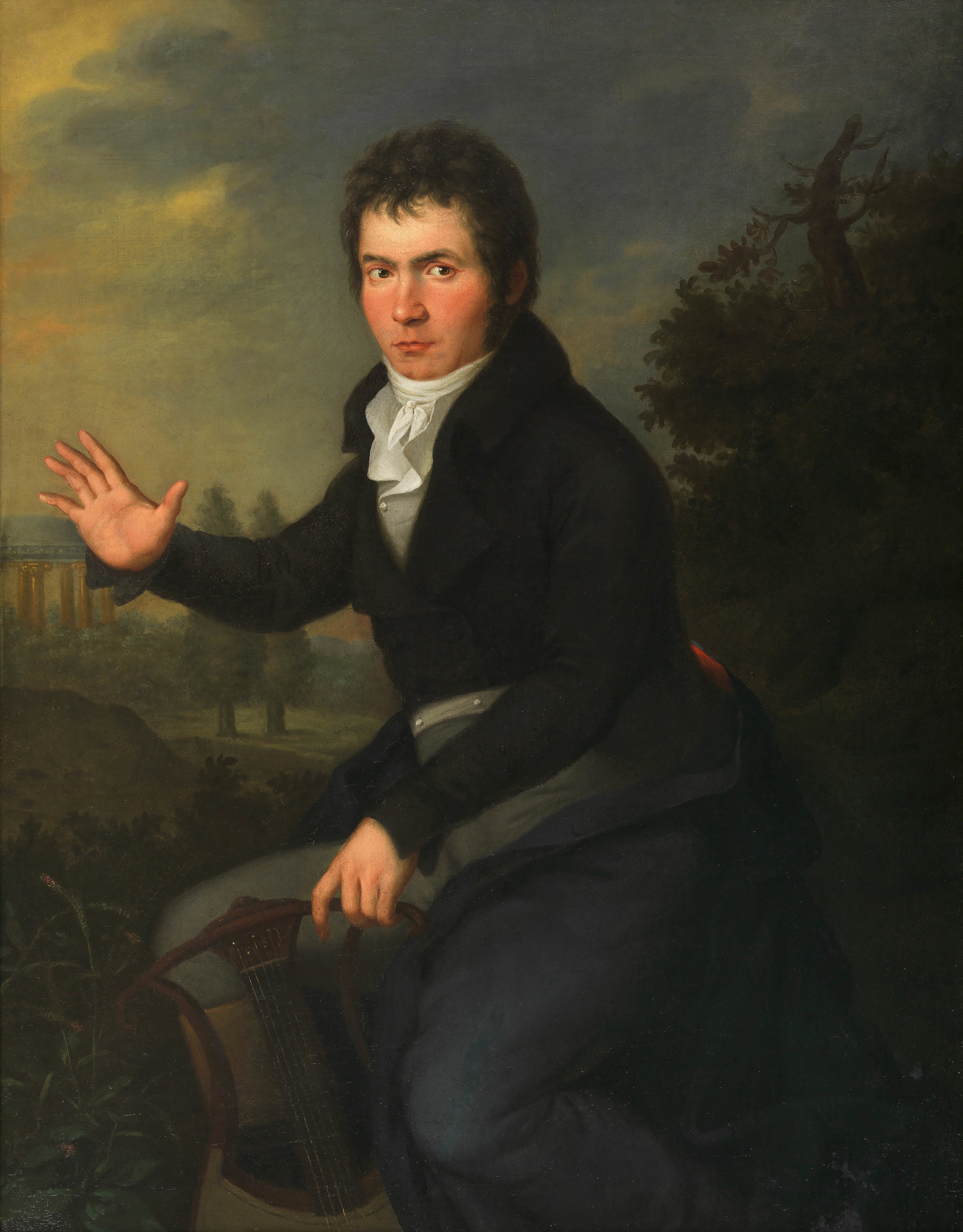
Portrait of Beethoven (age 33) with a lyre-guitar by Joseph Willibrord Mähler (c. 1804)

The String Quintet in C major, Op. 29, also known by the nickname "Storm", was composed by Ludwig van Beethoven in 1801. This work is scored for string quartet and an extra viola (two violins, two violas, and cello). The Op. 29 is Beethoven's only full-scale, original composition in the string quintet genre; of his other quintet works, the Op. 4 is an extensively reworked arrangement of the earlier Octet for Winds, Op. 103, the String Quintet Op. 104 is an arrangement of an earlier piano trio, and the later fugue is a short work.

The composer dedicated this work to Count Moritz von Fries, a patron to whom Beethoven also dedicated two other works of the same year—the Violin Sonatas No. 4 and No. 5—as well as his later Seventh Symphony.

== Movements ==
The work has four movements:

1. Allegretto
2. Adagissimo espressivo
3. Scherzo. Allegro
4. Presto

The first movement is in sonata form with two principal themes, the second appearing in an unusual key area. The slow movement is notable for its expressive character and emotional intensity. The scherzo is built largely from a brief one-bar leaping motif, contrasted by a more lyrical trio section. The finale contains prominent tremolo passages, contrapuntal writing including a fugato episode, and vigorous lower-string accompaniment, features that have contributed to the work's nickname, "Storm."

== Publication ==
Count Moritz von Fries, to whom the quintet is dedicated, probably commissioned the work and held exclusive rights to it for six months after its completion. When that period expired, Beethoven sold the work to Breitkopf & Härtel. A dispute subsequently arose because the Viennese publisher Artaria had obtained access to the work through Fries and also prepared it for publication, resulting in a legal conflict over publication rights.

== Reception ==
Although generally regarded as an important chamber work, the quintet has been performed less frequently than Beethoven's string quartets. Robert Simpson described its relative neglect as "shameful" and argued that it could be viewed as a culmination of the composer's Op. 18 quartets.

== Influence ==
This quintet allegedly inspired Schubert to write his own string quintet in the same key (his scoring involves two cellos rather than two violas as in Beethoven's quintet). Additionally, the opening of the String Sextet No. 1 by Johannes Brahms recalls the opening of this quintet. Brahms had been influenced by Joseph Joachim, an admirer of Beethoven's quintet, and revised his sextet to more closely align it with Beethoven's choices of texture and structure.
