= String Quintet No. 5 (Boccherini) =

1775 quintet by Luigi Boccherini

- by Luigi Boccherini
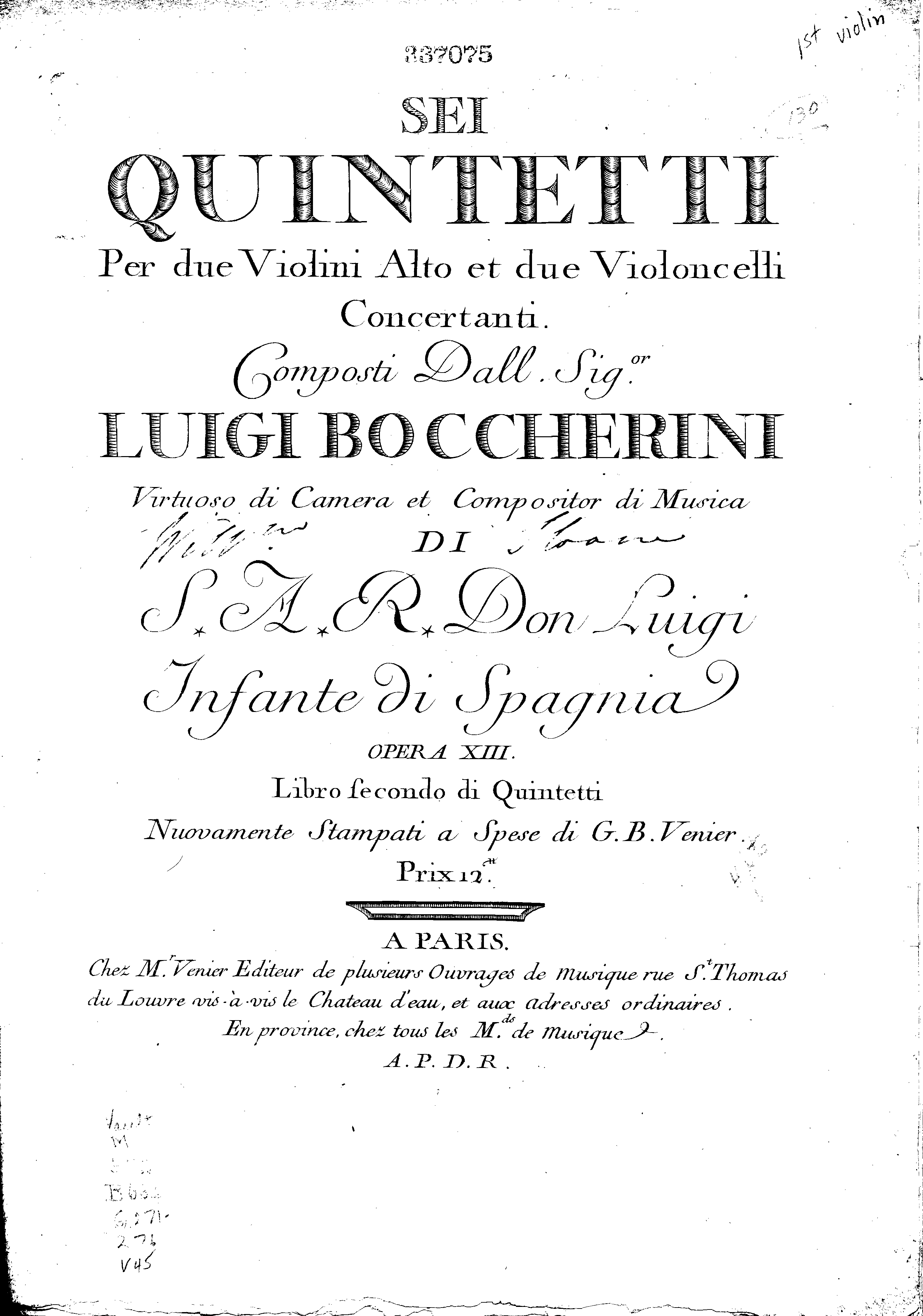
- The title page of Boccherini's second set of string quintets, from the 1st edition
- Key: E major
- Catalogue: G 275
- Opus: 13
- Genre: Chamber music
- Style: Classical
- Composed: 1771
- Published: 1775
- Movements: 4
- Scoring: String quintet (2 violins, 1 viola, and 2 cellos)

The String Quintet No. 5 in E major, Op. 11 (G 275), by Luigi Boccherini was written in 1771 and published in 1775. The quintet is famous for its minuet third movement which is frequently played as a standalone piece outside of the context of the full quintet.

== Background ==
The String Quintet in E major is scored for two violins, viola, and two cellos. Wolfgang Amadeus Mozart and other composers wrote quite often for string quintets with two violas. As a cellist, Luigi Boccherini had a professional interest in adding another cello to the string quartet, which enabled him to play more florid parts. Boccherini's version of the quintet was popular with other composers like Giuseppe Cambini and Gaetano Brunetti.

By 1771, Boccherini had been writing string quartets for a decade. He was now situated as the composer and cellist for the household of Don Luis, the brother of King Charles III of Spain. Violist Francisco Font and his three sons performed Boccherini's string quartets for the court. The composer would join them for performances of his quintets.

Boccherini's first set of string quintets (Op. 10) were also composed in 1771. His second set (Op. 13) consisted of six quintets. The most enduring piece of the cycle is String Quintet No. 5, because of its minuet. When it was originally published, it received no special recognition.

== Structure ==
The quintet has four movements:

1. Amoroso
2. Allegro e con spirito
3. Minuetto, Trio
4. Rondeau

=== III. Minuet ===
The third movement of the quintet is the most famous, and is the most often performed of all the movements. It is in 3/4 time, in the key of A major modulating to D major.

In the beginning of the movement, the first violin plays a simple, elegant melody, while the viola and cello have eighth note pizzicato. The second violin, on the other hand, has quick sixteenth note slurs which contain many string crossings. As Elisabeth Le Guin puts it in Boccherini’s Body: An Essay in Carnal Musicology, "The second violinist has no time for galanterie; he must concentrate on keeping the constant string crossings reasonable even through the length of the bow."

The first eight measures are shown below.

== Arrangements ==
The quintet, and especially its minuet, have been arranged many times. Arrangements of the minuet are also used in the Suzuki method.

== Other uses ==
The minuet has been used extensively in popular media including movies, television and video games, often to denote settings within high society. For instance, it has been used in the films The Magnificent Ambersons (1942), The Time of Their Lives (1946), the British black comedy The Ladykillers (1955), in the music-box music in Two Rode Together (1961), and in the Soviet animated film Alice in Wonderland (1981).
