= Piano Trios, Op. 1 (Beethoven) =

1795 piano trios by Ludwig van Beethoven

Piano Trios
- by Ludwig van Beethoven
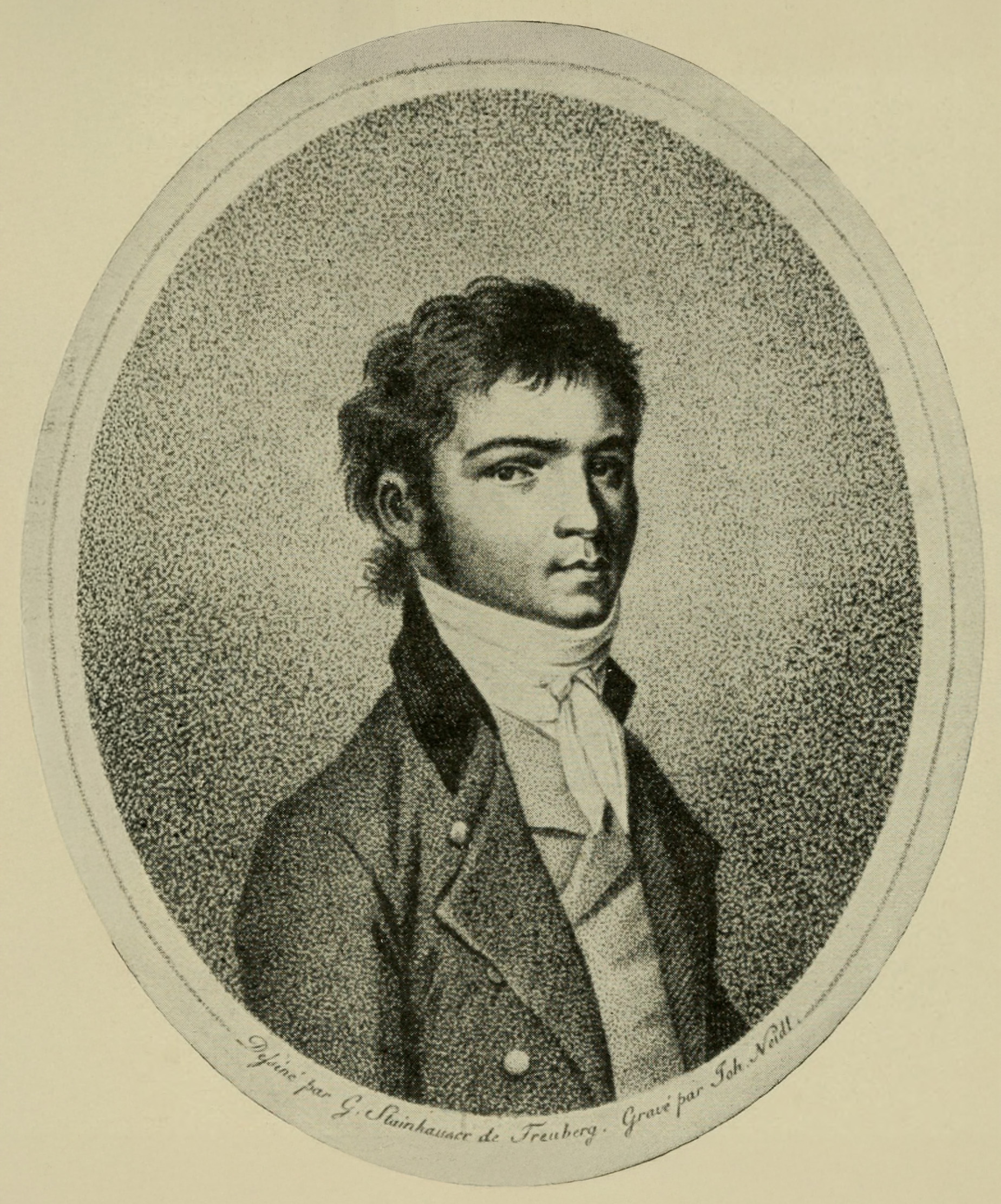
- The earliest known portrait of Beethoven; 1801 engraving by Johann Joseph Neidl after a now-lost portrait by Gandolph Ernst Stainhauser von Treuberg, ca. 1800
- Key: E♭ major; G major; C minor
- Opus: 1/1–3
- Dedication: Prince Lichnowsky
- Performed: 1795: Vienna

Ludwig van Beethoven's Opus 1 is a set of three piano trios (written for piano, violin, and cello), first performed in 1795 in the house of Prince Lichnowsky, to whom they are dedicated. The trios were published in 1795.

Despite the Op. 1 designation, these trios were not Beethoven's first published compositions; this distinction belongs rather to his Dressler Variations for keyboard (WoO 63). Clearly he recognized the Op. 1 compositions as the earliest ones he had produced that were substantial enough (and marketable enough) to fill out a first major publication to introduce his style of writing to the musical public.

== No. 1 in E♭ major ==
The first trio is in four movements:

1. Allegro (E♭ major), 4/4
2. Adagio cantabile (A♭ major), 3/4
3. Scherzo. Allegro assai (E♭ major, with trio in A♭ major), 3/4
4. Finale. Presto (E♭ major), 2/4

The first movement opens with an ascending arpeggiated figure (a so-called Mannheim Rocket, like that opening the first movement of the composer's own Piano Sonata No.1, Op.2 No.1),

== No. 2 in G major ==
The second trio is in four movements:

1. Adagio, 3/4 – Allegro vivace, 2/4 (G major)
2. Largo con espressione (E major), 6/8
3. Scherzo. Allegro (G major, with a trio in B minor), 3/4
4. Finale. Presto (G major), 2/4

== No. 3 in C minor ==
The third trio is in four movements:

1. Allegro con brio (C minor), 3/4
2. Andante cantabile con Variazioni (E♭ major), 2/4
3. Minuetto. Quasi allegro (C minor, with a trio in C major), 3/4
4. Finale. Prestissimo (C minor, concluding in C major), 2/2

Unlike the other piano trios in this opus, the third trio does not have a scherzo as its third movement but a minuet instead.

This third piano trio was later reworked by Beethoven into the C minor string quintet, Op. 104.
