= String Quintet No. 2 (Mozart) =

String Quintet
- No. 2
- by W. A. Mozart
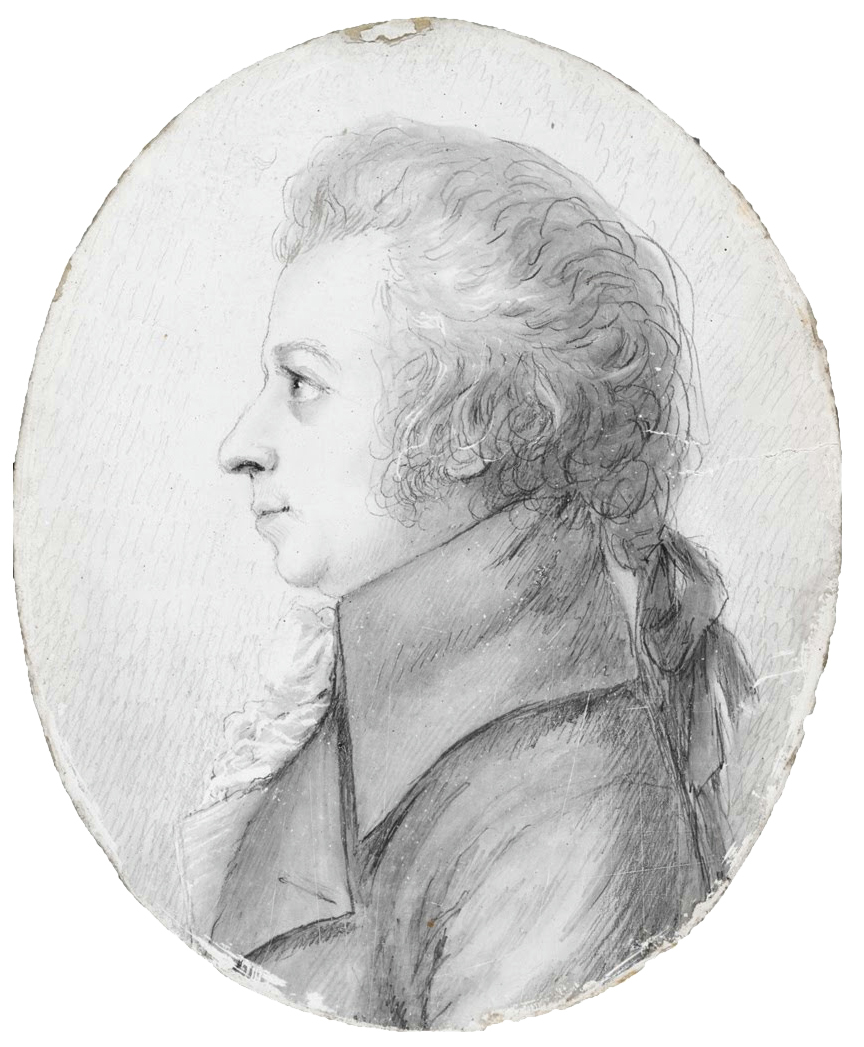
- 1789 miniature of Mozart
- Key: C minor
- Catalogue: K. 406/516b
- Based on: Serenade No. 12
- Composed: 1787
- Movements: 4
- Scoring: 2 violins; 2 violas; cello

The String Quintet No. 2 in C minor, K. 406/516b, was written by Wolfgang Amadeus Mozart in 1787. Like all of Mozart's string quintets, it is a "viola quintet" in that it is scored for string quartet and an extra viola (two violins, two violas and cello). Unlike his other string quintets, however, the work was not originally written for strings. Having completed the two string quintets K. 515 and K. 516, Mozart created a third by arranging his Serenade No. 12 for Winds in C minor K. 388/384a, written in 1782 or 1783 as a string quintet. Although by then Mozart was entering each new work into his catalogue of compositions, he did not enter this quintet, perhaps because it was an arrangement rather than a new work.

Since the wind serenade used pairs of oboes and clarinets, it was a straightforward matter to map these to the pairs of violins and violas. The arrangement is so successful that Richard Wigmore asserts, in his sleeve notes to the recording by the Nash Ensemble that "without prior knowledge few would guess that the work was not conceived for string quintet, even if the textures (except in the minuet) are generally simpler, less polyphonic than in K515 and 516".

== Form ==
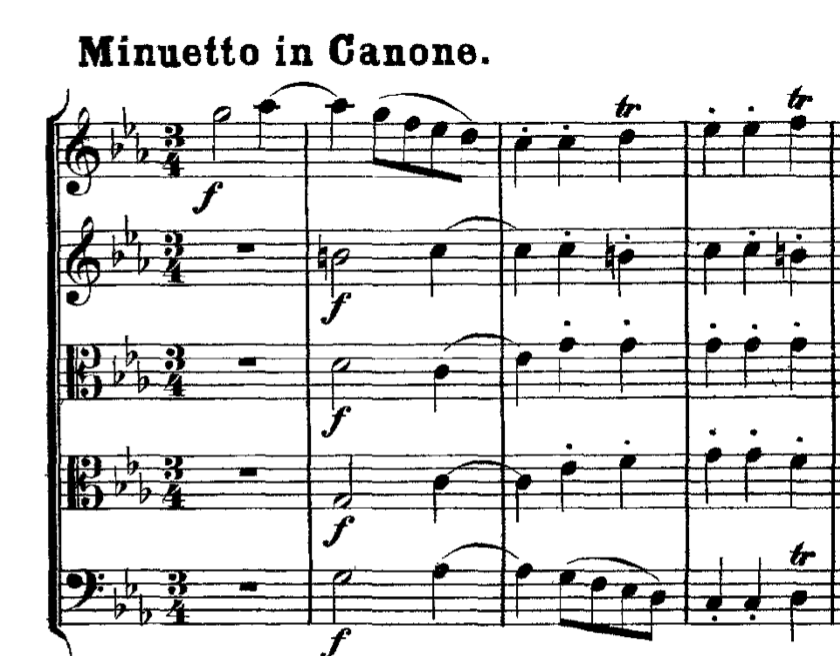
The opening of the Minuetto, with the cello entering in canon with the first violin

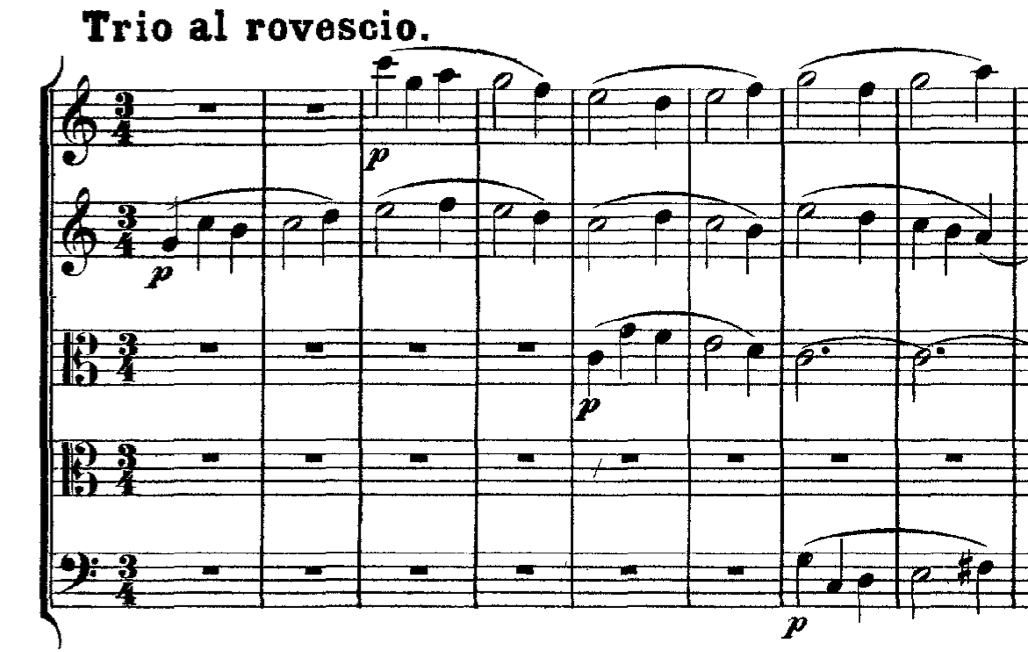
The first eight bars of the trio, showing the pairs of instruments answering in mirror canon

The work is in standard four movement form typical of contemporary symphonies and string quartets:

1. Allegro, 2/2 (cut time) in C minor
2. Andante, 3/8 in E♭ major
3. Menuetto in canone, 3/4 in C minor, with Trio in canone al rovescio in C major
4. Allegro 2/4 in C minor (ending in C major)

=== I. Allegro ===
Mozart contrasts the stark opening theme with a lyrical second subject in the relative major, E♭ major. In the recapitulation, however, the second subject returns in C minor, rather than C major, allowing the whole movement to conclude uncompromisingly in C minor.

=== II. Andante ===
The structure of the lyrical slow movement is unremarkable. As far as the process of arrangement is concerned, Mozart made small adjustments throughout to the musical material of the original wind serenade when rewriting the music for strings, one of which can be heard in the second subject of this movement. In the string quintet version, he inserts a chromatic note into the descending scale motif and adjusts the rhythm to accommodate it.

=== III. Menuetto in canone ===
The menuetto is a canon in which the violin enters first, with the cello following at an interval of one bar. The trio, in the major, is a double mirror canon, in which the second viola is silent. In it, each answering voice plays the previous musical material upside-down.

=== IV. Allegro ===
The last movement is a set of variations which, Wigmore points out, often treats the theme quite freely. The fifth variation, begun softly by violas (horns in the original wind version) is on a larger scale and is in the relative major key of C minor, E♭ major. The seventh variation explores the theme with chromatic harmonies. It is only with the final variation that the work finally turns to C major.
