= String Quintet No. 2 (Dvořák) =

1876 composition by Antonín Dvořák

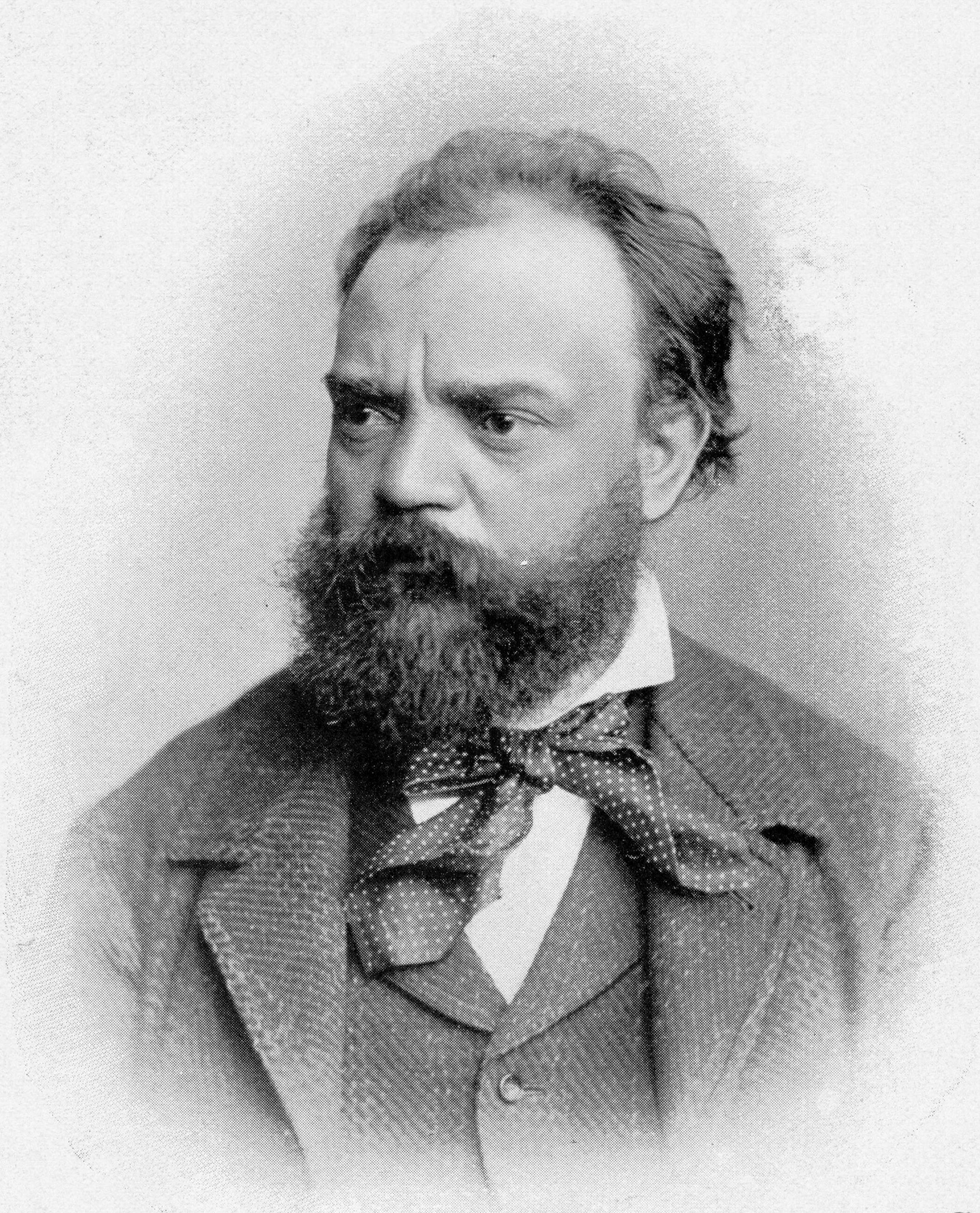
Antonín Dvořák in 1882

Antonín Dvořák's String Quintet No. 2 in G major, Op. 77 (B. 49), was originally composed in early March 1875 and first performed on 18 March 1876 in Prague at the concert of the Umělecká beseda. The string quintet is scored for two violins, viola, cello, and double bass.

== Background ==
First marked as Op. 18, it was later slightly revised in 1888 and printed with the misleading opus number 77 by the publisher Simrock. It has since been assigned the Burghauser number B. 49. Dvořák entered the piece in a competition and was awarded 5 ducats for the composition. The work bears the competition's motto, "To my Nation", as its dedication. The quintet marks an advance in comparison with Dvořák's early works for chamber ensemble, as it is not only technically more refined with a more balanced structure, but with the addition of a double bass as the fifth instrument has a more imposing sound while permitting the cello to move up to a higher, more lyrical position within the group.

Although the original work was scored in five movements, Dvořák later withdrew the second movement, entitled "Intermezzo," due to concerns that having two slow movements made the work too lengthy. This extracted movement had been based on the central section, marked 'Andante religioso', of his String Quartet No. 4 (which was not published in his lifetime), and was in turn later reworked and republished as the Nocturne for Strings in B major, Op. 40 (B. 47). Some modern ensembles choose to restore the intermezzo when performing the work.

== Structure ==
The quintet consists of four movements:

1. Allegro con fuoco
2. Scherzo. Allegro vivace
3. Poco andante
4. Finale. Allegro assai

== Selected recordings ==
- Vienna Konzerthaus Quartet and Josef Hermann (double bass). Westminster (LP) XWN 18066. Released 1956.
- Dvořák Quartet (Stanislav Srp, Jiří Kolář, Jaroslav Ruis, František Pišinger) with František Pošta (double-bass). Supraphon SUA 10186 (LP). Issued 1962.
- Members of the Vienna Octet (Anton Fietz & Wilhelm Hübner (violins), Günther Breitenbach (viola), Ferenc Mihály (cello), Burghard Kräutler (double-bass)). Recorded October 1969, issued on Decca SXL 6463 in 1970.
- Salvatore Accardo, Margaret Batjer, Toby Hoffman, Peter Wiley, Francesco Petracchi. Dynamic CDS 207/1-4. Recorded July 1986, released 1989.
- The Panocha Quartet with Pavel Nejtek (double-bass). Supraphon CD 11 1461-2 131. Recorded 1992.
- The Serenata of London. Collins Classics 30072. Released 1992.
- Coull Quartet with Peter Buckoke (double bass). Hyperion CDA66679. Recorded July 1993, issued 1994.
- The Chamber Music Society of Lincoln Center. Joseph Silverstein, Ani Kavafian, Paul Neubauer, Gary Hoffman, Edgar Meyer. CD. Delos, 1995.
- The Gaudier Ensemble (Marieke Blankestijn, Leslie Hatfield, Iris Juda, Christoph Marks, Stephen Williams). Hyperion CDA66796. Recorded March 1995, issued January 1996.
