= String Quintet No. 2 (Brahms) =

1890 string quintet by Johannes Brahms

String Quintet
- No. 2
- by Johannes Brahms
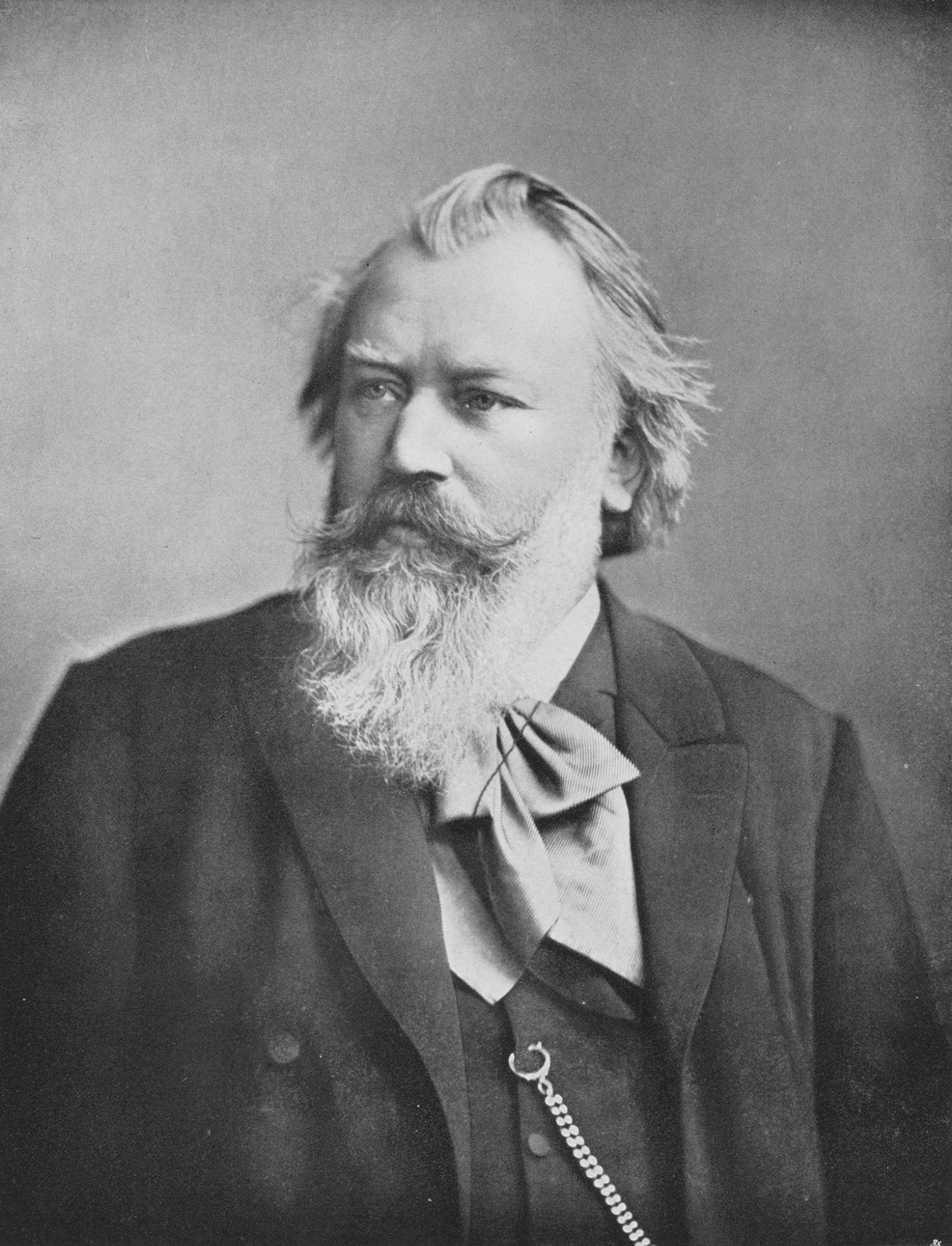
- The composer in 1889
- Key: G major
- Opus: 111
- Composed: 1890
- Performed: 11 November 1890: Bad Ischl
- Published: 1891
- Publisher: Simrock
- Movements: 3
- Scoring: 2 violins; 2 violas; cello

String Quintet No. 2 in G major, Op. 111, is a string quintet by Johannes Brahms composed in Bad Ischl in 1890 and published in 1891. It is known as the Prater Quintet. Brahms intended it to be his last piece of music, though he later produced a number of piano pieces and the two sonatas for clarinet or viola and piano. The first performance of the Quintet in Vienna on 11 November 1890 was a sensation.

Like Brahms' earlier string quintet, Opus 88, it is a viola quintet, scored for two violins, two violas and cello. The work has four movements.

== Music ==
The quintet has four movements:

1. Allegro non troppo, ma con brio
2. Adagio
3. Un poco allegretto
4. Vivace, ma non troppo presto

The first movement is marked Allegro non troppo, ma con brio, and is in 9/8. Its opening is dominated by a cello solo in G major. The middle section is in G minor, though it passes through numerous keys before returning to G major by the end.

The second movement is marked Adagio, and is in 2/4. It starts with a viola solo accompanied by cello pizzicato. Then a ghostly triplet motif is presented by the viola. Both of these thematic materials are played by different instruments and developed, with one section combining the triplet and pizzicato motifs with the opening theme. There is a stormy middle section reminiscent of Schubert's Cello Quintet. The entire movement has a key signature of D minor, but it ends on a D major chord.

The third movement, marked Un poco allegretto, is in 3/4 time and is loosely based on a minuet and trio form, finishing with a short coda that uses the material of the trio instead of that of the minuet. The "minuet" section, which is in G minor, is followed by a "trio" section in G major, followed by another "minuet" section (written out) and finally the coda section in the key of the trio.

The fourth movement, marked Vivace, ma non troppo presto, is in 2/4 and has a key signature of one sharp (G major and E minor) throughout. It displays influences of Hungarian music. The opening theme in the first viola is in B minor and is copied by the first violin nine bars later. However, a new, upbeat, dance-like theme in G major is presented shortly after in the 1st violin. Many different thematic materials are presented in this movement's exposition, many of which are developed in the intensely fugal development section. After a recap of the original thematic material, there is a large unison scale played forte by all of the instruments right before the stringendo coda. The movement (and the piece) end in G major.
