= String Quintet No. 1 (Dvořák) =

String quintet by Antonín Dvořák

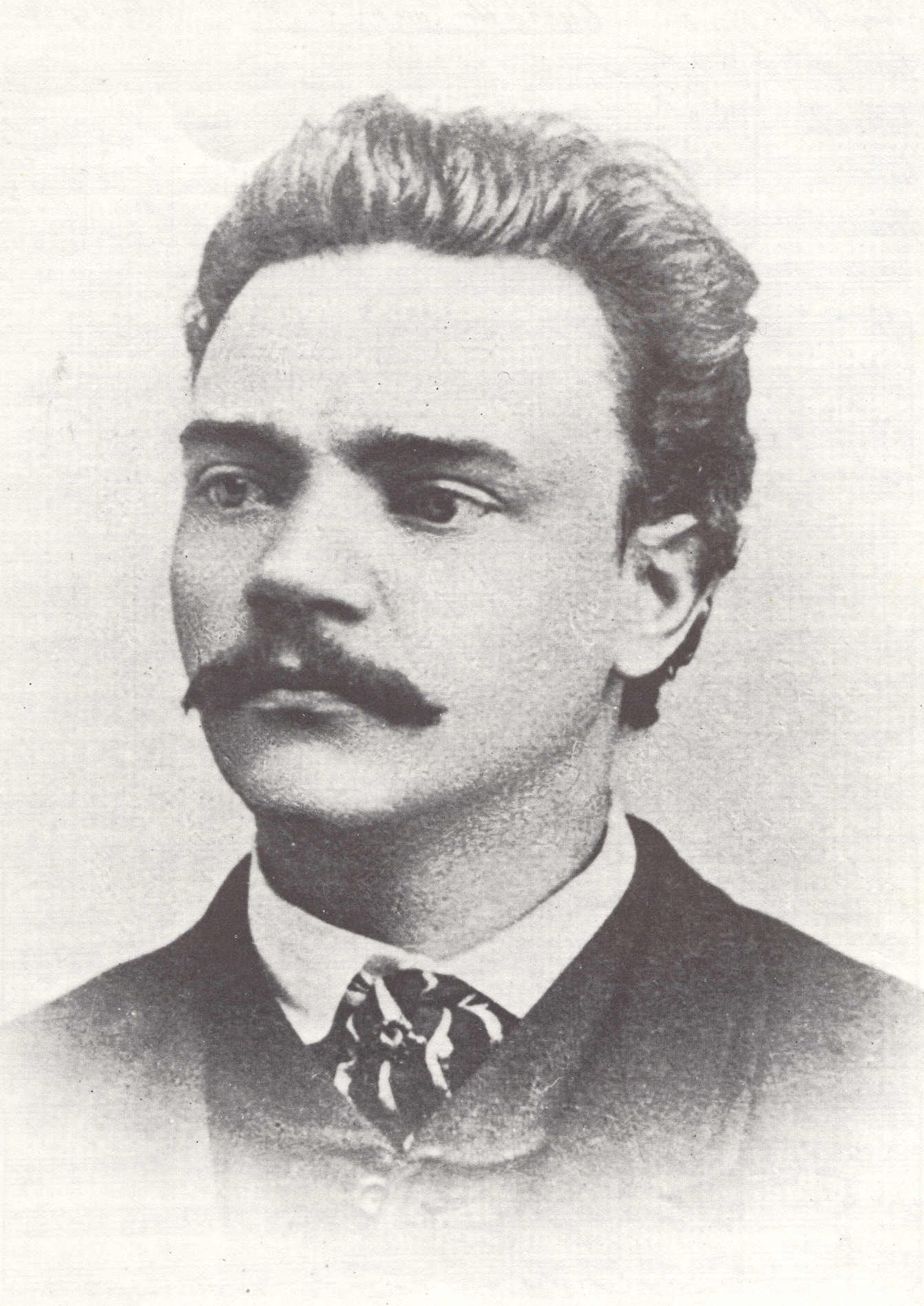
Antonín Dvořák in 1868

The String Quintet No. 1 in A minor, Op. 1 (B. 7), is a string quintet by Antonín Dvořák, scored for two violins, two violas and cello. Composed in 1861, it is the first piece to which he assigned an opus number and the work with which he, at age 20, launched his career as a composer.

It was not premiered until 1921, 17 years after his death, when it was played in Prague by Josef Hašek, Jan Bruna, Bohumil Klabík, Josef Tesárek, and Bedřich Jaroš. It was first published in 1943.

== Structure ==
The composition consists of three movements:

1. Adagio — Allegro ma non troppo (A minor)
2. Lento (F major)
3. Finale. Allegro con brio (A minor)

A typical performance takes approximately 28 minutes.
