= String Quintet No. 6 (Mozart) =

1791 composition by W. A. Mozart

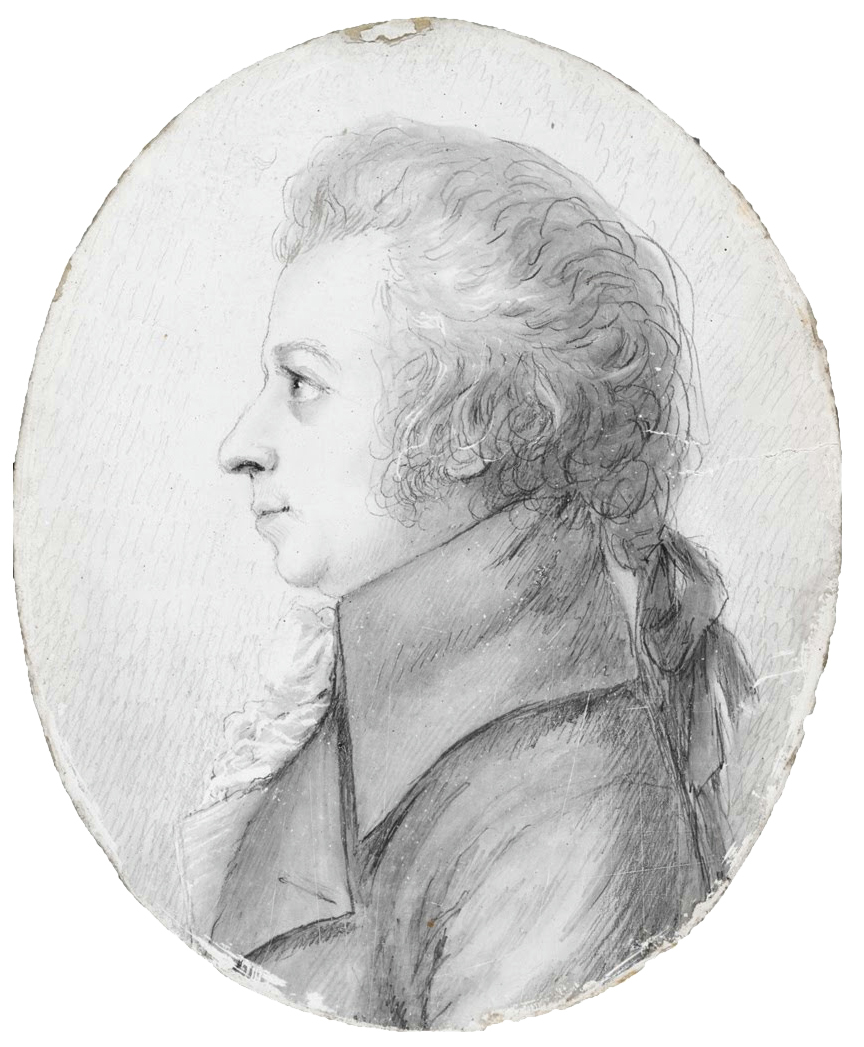
Stock's 1789 miniature of Mozart

The String Quintet No. 6 in E♭ major, K. 614, was completed by Wolfgang Amadeus Mozart on 12 April 1791. It is Mozart's last major chamber work. Like all of Mozart's string quintets, it is a "viola quintet" in that it is scored for string quartet and an extra viola (two violins, two violas and cello.)

== Movements ==
The work is in standard four movement form:

1. Allegro di molto 6/8 in E♭ major
2. Andante in B♭ major
3. Menuetto: Allegretto 3/4 in E♭ major, with trio in E♭ major
4. Allegro 2/4 in E♭ major

== Reception ==
This quintet, along with the contemporary string quintet K. 593, are sometimes dismissed as second-rate works reflecting the composer's straitened circumstances towards the end of his life. However, Eisen makes the point that rather than reflecting the "Classical" ideal, they are a new path for Mozart, one which eschews surface variety for the exploration of a single motivating idea that determines both the surface and structure of the work. While the slow movement is apparently a theme and variations, Eisen points out that it also takes on the characteristics of a rondo and of a sonata. Simon Keefe points out that, in contrast to the string quintets that preceded it, "The first movement of K. 614 takes us back to the world of Mozart's concertos, reinforcing the impression ... of stylistic cross fertilization from the final piano concertos to the late string chamber music." Leonard Ratner comments on the originality of the writing in the first movement coda: "three levels of action—paired violas in a middle register, high violins paired, and the low cello—create the texture. ... the briliance and drive of this passage have a physical impact that would better be described as counteraction rather than counterpoint."
