= G major =

Major key and scale based on the note G

- Relative key: E minor
- Parallel key: G minor
- Dominant key: D major
- Subdominant key: C major

Component pitches
- G, A, B, C, D, E, F♯

G major is a major scale based on G, with the pitches G, A, B, C, D, E, and F♯. Its key signature has one sharp. Its relative minor is E minor and its parallel minor is G minor.

The G major scale is:

Changes needed for the melodic and harmonic versions of the scale are written in with accidentals as necessary. The G harmonic major and melodic major scales are:

== Scale degree chords ==
The scale degree chords of G major are:

- Tonic – G major
- Supertonic – A minor
- Mediant – B minor
- Subdominant – C major
- Dominant – D major
- Submediant – E minor
- Leading-tone – F-sharp diminished

== Notable compositions ==
=== Baroque period ===
In Baroque music, G major was regarded as the "key of benediction".

Of Domenico Scarlatti's 555 keyboard sonatas, G major is the home key for 69, or about 12.4%, sonatas.

In the music of Johann Sebastian Bach, "G major is often a key of 6/8 chain rhythms", according to Alfred Einstein, although Bach also used the key for some 4/4-based works, including his third and fourth Brandenburg Concertos. Pianist Jeremy Denk observes that the Goldberg Variations are 80 minutes in G major.

=== Classical era ===
Twelve of Joseph Haydn's 106 symphonies are in G major. Likewise, one of Haydn's most famous piano trios, No. 39 (with the Gypsy Rondo), and one of his last two complete published string quartets (Op. 77, No. 1), are in G major.

In addition, G major is the home key of Mozart's Eine kleine Nachtmusik, serving as the tonic for three of its four movements (the only exception being the second movement, titled Romanze which is in the subdominant key of C major). However, almost none of his large-scale works such as his symphonies or concertos are in this key; exceptions are the Violin Concerto No. 3, Piano Concerto No. 17, Flute Concerto No. 1 and his String Quartet No. 14, along with some examples among his juvenilia.

For Ludwig van Beethoven, G major was a key for optimism and cheerful energy. He regularly used this key, for instance in his Piano Sonatas No. 10, No. 16, No. 20 and No. 25, Rondo for piano, Op. 51, Rage Over a Lost Penny, Violin sonatas No. 8 and No. 10, String Trio No. 2, String Quartet No. 2, Piano Trio No. 2, Romance for violin and orchestra, Op. 40 and Piano Concerto No. 4.

Franz Schubert rarely used the key of G major, although a few important compositions are written in this key, including Mass No. 2 D 167, String Quartet No. 15 D 887 and Piano Sonata op. 78 D 894.

=== Romantic era ===
The Romantic composers often used keys distant from G major. Composers like Robert Schumann, Felix Mendelssohn, César Franck, Max Bruch, Anton Bruckner, Modest Mussorgsky, Alexander Borodin, César Cui and Sergei Rachmaninoff only used this key in a few small-scale or miscellaneous compositions, or even avoided it completely. Nonetheless, some important Romantic music was written in G major.

Harold en Italie, a symphony with a solo viola part by Hector Berlioz, is in G major. Frédéric Chopin's Prelude Op. 28/3, his Nocturne Op. 37/2 and his Mazurka Op. 50/1 are in this key as well.

It is also the key of three major chamber music compositions by Johannes Brahms: String Sextet No. 2 Op. 36, Violin Sonata No. 1 Op. 78 and String Quintet No. 2 Op. 111. Antonín Dvořák wrote four important pieces in G major: String Quintet No. 2, Op. 77, Symphony No. 8 Op. 88, Sonatina for Violin and Piano Op. 100, which he wrote for his children, and String Quartet No. 13, Op. 106.

The Violin Sonata No. 2 Op. 13 by Edvard Grieg is in G major.

Camille Saint-Saëns chose G major as the key for his String Quartet No. 2 and his Sonata for Bassoon and Piano. Gabriel Fauré only wrote one major composition in this key: his second Barcarolle for Piano, Op. 41.

The three major compositions in G major of Pyotr Ilyich Tchaikovsky are his Piano Concerto No. 2 Op. 44 and his orchestral suites No. 3, Op. 55 and No. 4 "Mozartiana" Op. 61. Three Préludes for Piano (Op. 11/3, Op. 13/3 and Op. 39/3) by Alexander Scriabin are in G major, as well as the Mazurka for orchestra op. 18, the String Quartet No. 3 Op. 26 and the Oriental Rhapsody for orchestra Op. 29 by Alexander Glazunov.

=== Post-Romantic and modern era ===
Gustav Mahler's Symphony No. 4 and Richard Strauss's tone poem Aus Italien Op. 16, are in G major.

It's the key for the opening 'Sinfonia' of Igor Stravinsky's Pulcinella suite, and for the Piano Concerto for two hands and the Violin Sonata No. 2 by Maurice Ravel. The fifth sonata of the Six Sonatas for solo violin by Eugène Ysaÿe is also in G major.

Sergei Prokofiev wrote his Piano Concerto No. 5 Op. 55 in this key, and Dmitri Shostakovich chose it for his Cello Concerto No. 2 Op. 126 and his String Quartet No. 6 Op. 101.

== In popular culture ==
G major is the key stipulated for the royal anthem of Canada, "God Save the King". The anthem "God Defend New Zealand" ("Aotearoa") was originally composed by John Joseph Woods in A-flat major, but after becoming New Zealand's national anthem in 1977, it was rearranged into G major to better suit general and massed singing. According to Spotify, G major is the most common key of music on the streaming service (closely followed by C major).

== See also ==
- Major and minor
- Chord (music)
- Chord notation

No.	Flats		Sharps	
No.	Major	minor	Major	minor
0	C	a	C	a
1	F	d	G	e
2	B♭	g	D	b
3	E♭	c	A	f♯
4	A♭	f	E	c♯
5	D♭	b♭	B	g♯
6	G♭	e♭	F♯	d♯
7	C♭	a♭	C♯	a♯
8	F♭	d♭	G♯	e♯
