= String Quintet, Op. 104 (Beethoven) =

String quintet by Ludwig van Beethoven

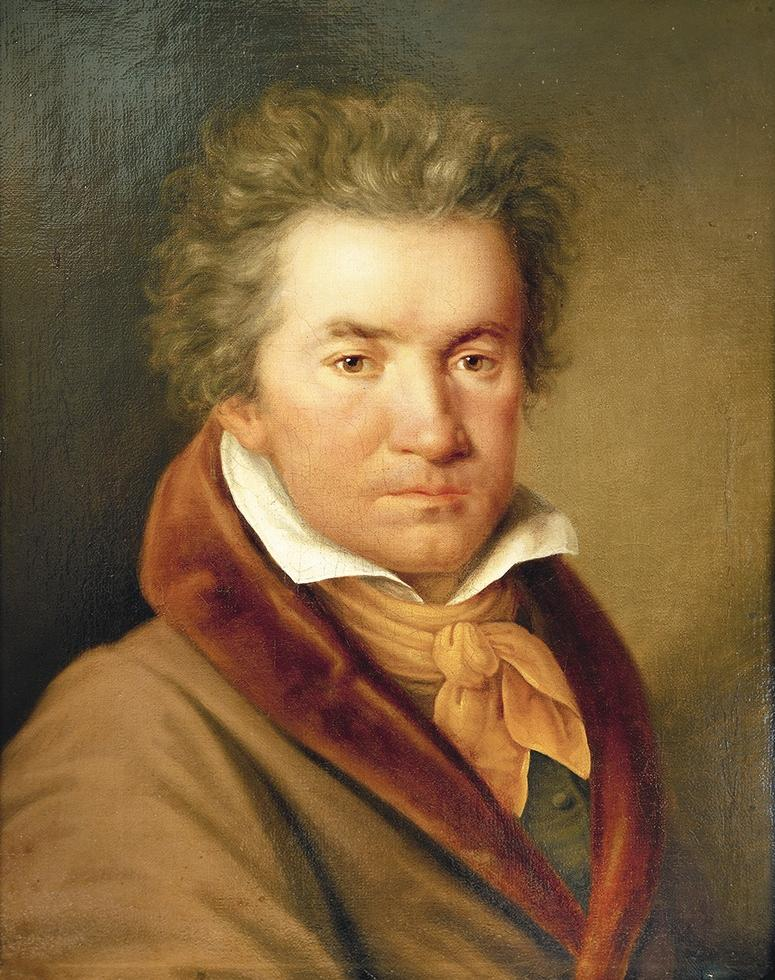
Portrait of Ludwig van Beethoven (1815)

The String Quintet in C minor, Op.104 was written by Ludwig van Beethoven in 1817, performed on 10 December 1818, and published in 1819. It is an arrangement of the early C minor Piano Trio, Op. 1 No. 3, which was originally written in 1793. It is scored for a string quintet with two violas.

The work is referenced in Vikram Seth's 1999 novel An Equal Music.

== Structure ==
The work is structured in four movements:

1. Allegro con brio (C minor)
2. Andante cantabile con Variazioni (E♭ major)
3. Minuetto. Quasi allegro (C minor, with a trio in C major)
4. Finale. Prestissimo (C minor, with a tierce de picardie)
