= String Quintet No. 4 (Mozart) =

1787 composition by W. A. Mozart

String Quintet
- No. 4
- by W. A. Mozart
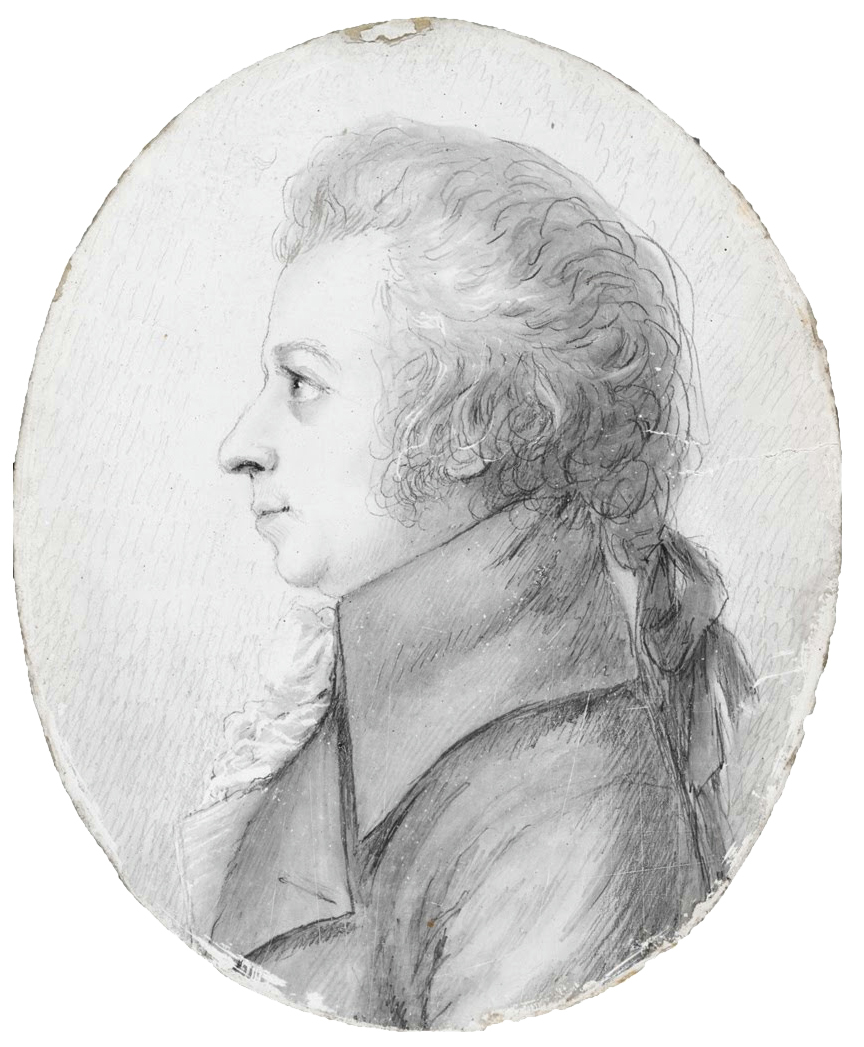
- 1789 miniature of Mozart
- Key: G minor
- Catalogue: K. 516
- Composed: 1787
- Movements: 4
- Scoring: 2 violins; 2 violas; cello

The String Quintet No. 4 in G minor, K. 516, written by Wolfgang Amadeus Mozart, is like all of Mozart's string quintets a "viola quintet" in that it is scored for string quartet and an extra viola (i.e., two violins, two violas, and cello). The mood of the piece is dark and melancholic, typical of Mozart's G minor works.

The work was completed on 16 May 1787, less than a month after the completion of his grand C major Quintet, K. 515. This would not be the last time that a great pair of C major/G minor works of the same form would be published in close proximity and assigned consecutive Köchel numbers. The following year, the 40th (G minor) and 41st (C major) symphonies would be completed within a few weeks of each other.

The autograph manuscript of the quintet is preserved in the Jagiellonian Library (Kraków).

== Movements ==
String Quintet No. 4, K. 516
I. Allegro

II. Menuetto: Allegretto

III. Adagio ma non troppo

IV. Adagio – Allegro
Performed by Roxana Pavel Goldstein, Elizabeth Choi, violins; Elias Goldstein, Sally Chisholm, violas; Jocelyn Butler, cello

The work is in four movements:

1. Allegro (G minor, sonata form)
2. Menuetto: Allegretto 3/4 (G minor, ternary form, trio in G major)
3. Adagio ma non troppo (E♭ major, modified sonata form with no development)
4. Adagio 3/4 (G minor) – Allegro 6/8 (G major, sonata rondo form)

The first movement is in sonata form with both the first and second themes beginning in G minor. The movement does not resolve to the major key in the recapitulation, and it has a minor-key ending.

The minuet, placed second, is a minuet in name only, as the turbulent G minor theme and heavy third-beat chords make this movement unlike a dance. The heavy third-beat chords are diminished seventh chords. Two are heard in the first section, but three are heard in the second section, with all twelve notes of the chromatic scale present in the chords just before the trio. The central trio, by contrast, is in a bright G major; unusually it is written in a 3-bar rhythm, which it picks up from the final bars of the minuet. As is typical of Classical-era minuets, the main section is repeated following the trio, ending the movement in G minor.

The third movement, in E♭ major, is slow, melancholic and wistful, furthering the despair brought forth by the previous movements. Pyotr Ilyich Tchaikovsky said of this movement: "No one has ever known as well how to interpret so exquisitely in music the sense of resigned and inconsolable sorrow."

The start of the fourth movement is not the typical quick-tempo finale, but a slow aria back in the home key of G minor. It is a dirge or lament that is even slower than the previous movement. The music remains in this dark area for a few minutes before reaching an ominous pause. At this point, Mozart launches into the ebullient G major Allegro, which creates a stark contrast between it and the movements that preceded it. Critics have often questioned how such an insouciant and carefree finale could follow after three-plus movements of intense pathos, even though it conforms perfectly to the Classical understanding of a finale as resolving everything that preceded it.
