= String Quintet No. 1 (Mendelssohn) =

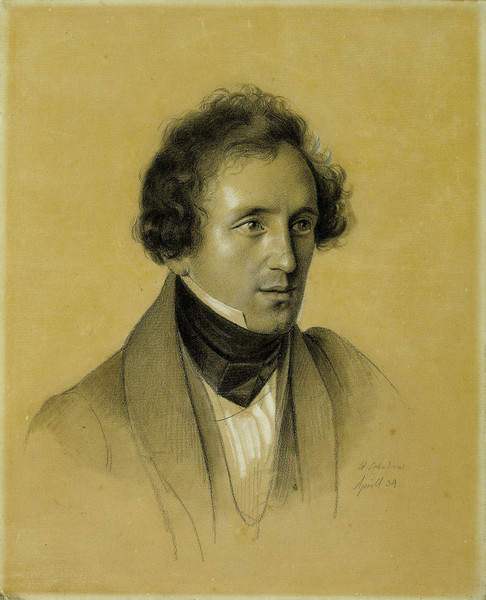
Felix Mendelssohn by Friedrich Wilhelm Schadow, 1834

The String Quintet No. 1 in A major, Op. 18, was composed by Felix Mendelssohn in 1826 and revised in 1832. The piece is scored for two violins, two violas and cello.

== Composition history ==
The quintet was written in 1826, shortly after the completion of the String Octet, when Mendelssohn was just seventeen years old. Dissatisfied with the original minuet second movement, in 1832 he substituted a slow movement composed in memory of his friend the violinist Eduard Rietz. It is this revised version of the quintet which was published in Bonn the same year.

== Movements ==
Like all of Mendelssohn's string quartets, this work has four movements:

1. Allegro con moto
2. Intermezzo: Andante sostenuto
3. Scherzo: Allegro di molto
4. Allegro vivace

A typical performance lasts just under 30 minutes.
