= String Quintet, Op. 4 (Beethoven) =

String quintet by Ludwig van Beethoven

String Quintet
- by Ludwig van Beethoven
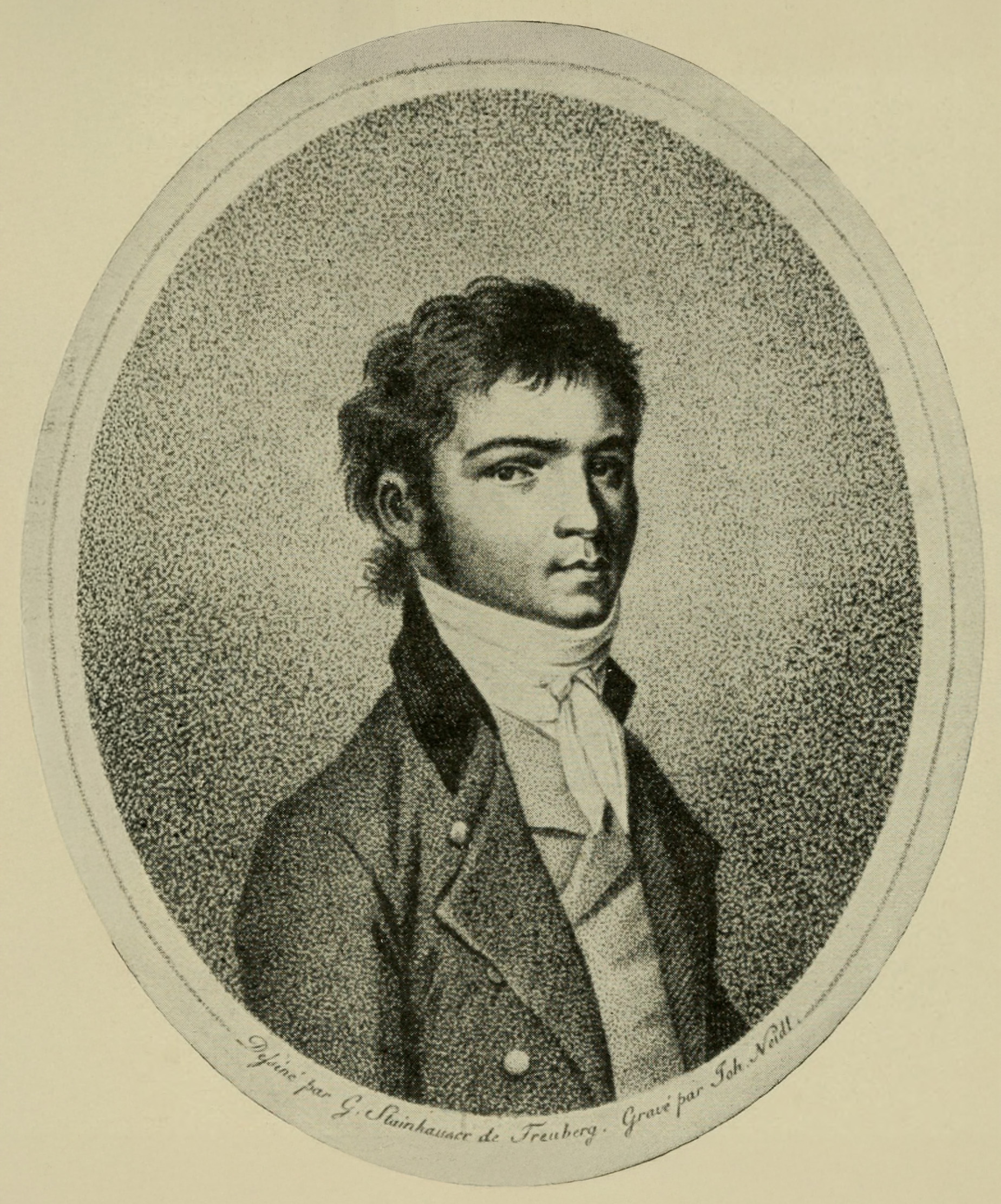
- Beethoven in 1801, engraving after portrait by Carl Traugott Riedel
- Key: E♭ major
- Opus: 4
- Related: adapted from his Octet
- Composed: 1795
- Published: 1796
- Movements: Four
- Scoring: 2 violins; 2 violas; cello

The String Quintet in E♭ major, Op. 4, was composed by Ludwig van Beethoven in 1795. It was adapted from his Octet, Op. 103, which, despite its high opus number, was in fact composed by Beethoven in 1792/1793 but was published only in 1837, ten years after the composer's death. The Quintet was published in Vienna in 1796.

== Overview ==
The quintet has been viewed as a mere transcription of the octet. However, there are a few differences between the two works. In the first movement, there are significant changes in the exposition and substantial ones in the development, recapitulation, and coda. The ensuing Andante employs new themes and involves significant changes in the ones retained. The minuet and finale are also substantially different: among other alterations, a second trio was added to the former and a new alternate theme was inserted in the latter.

== Structure and instrumentation ==
The quintet is structured in four movements:

1. Allegro con brio
2. Andante (B♭ major)
3. Menuetto: Allegretto – Trio I & II (A♭ major)
4. Finale: Presto

The work is scored for two violins, two violas and cello. A typical performance lasts for about 30 minutes.
