= String Quintet No. 1 (Brahms) =

String Quintet
- No. 1
- by Johannes Brahms
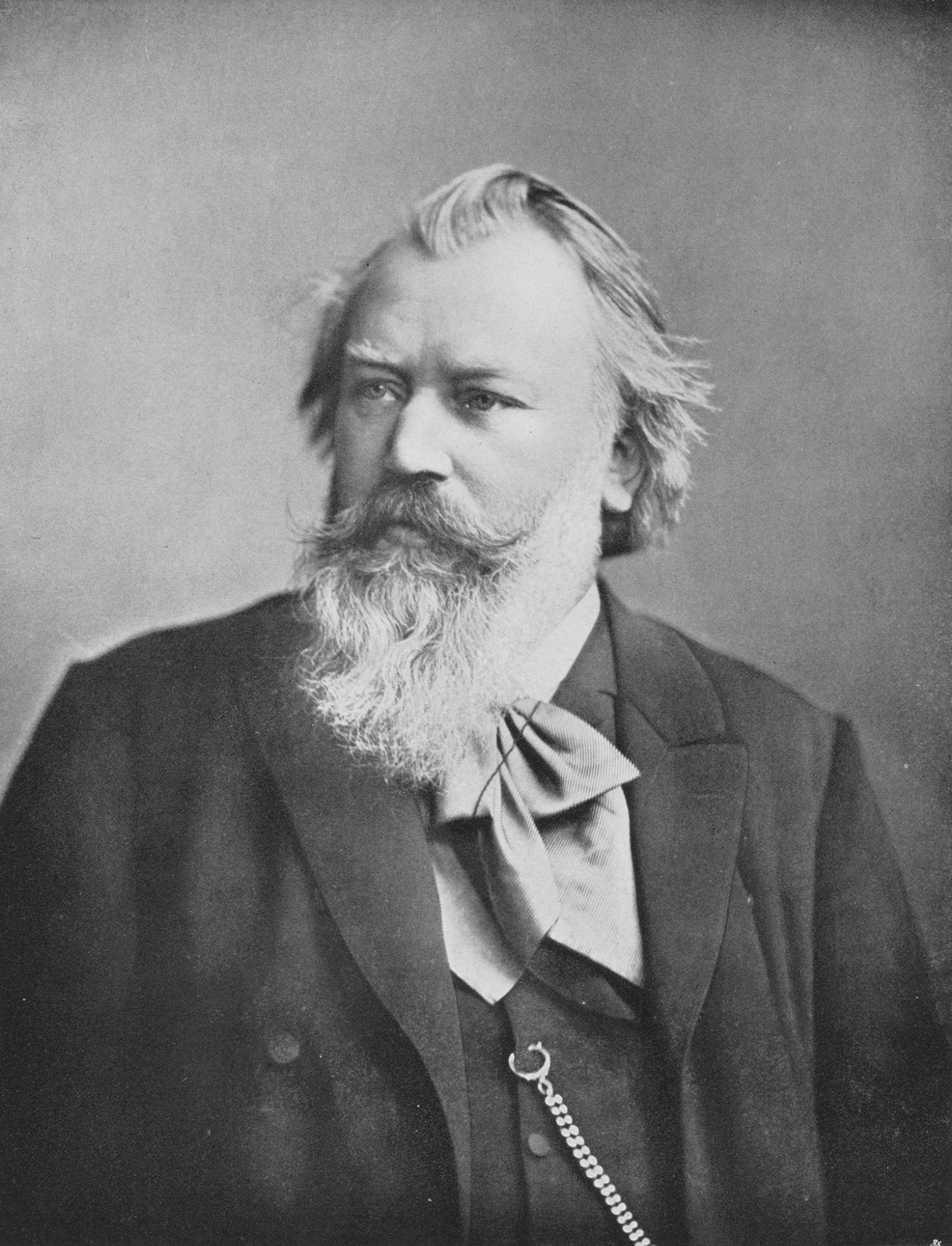
- The composer in 1889
- Key: F major
- Opus: 88
- Composed: 1882
- Performed: 29 December 1882: Frankfurt
- Publisher: Simrock
- Movements: 3
- Scoring: 2 violins; 2 violas; cello

The String Quintet No. 1 in F major, Op. 88, is a work composed in 1882 by Johannes Brahms in Bad Ischl, Upper Austria. It was first performed at a chamber music museum concert in Frankfurt on 29 December 1882. It was published by Simrock. Brahms regarded it as one of his finest works.

== History ==
Johannes Brahms tried writing in the genre of the string quintet as a young man in the early 1860s, writing a work for string quartet and a second cello, as in Schubert's String Quintet. He was not satisfied with the attempt and rewrote the music first for two pianos, then in 1865 as a Piano Quintet, Op. 34.

Brahms composed Op. 88 in the spa town of Bad Ischl in 1882, interrupting work on his Piano Trio No. 2. He followed the example of Mozart's string quartets, using a second viola. He called the quintet a Frühlingsprodukt (product of spring), and would compose his Second String Quintet, Op. 111, also in Ischl.

It was published by the firm of Fritz Simrock. The quintet was first performed at a chamber music concert of the Frankfurter Museumsgesellschaft on 29 December 1882, at which the piano trio was also premiered; audiences at this concert preferred the string quintet.

== Music ==
I. Allegro non troppo ma con brio

II. Grave ed appassionato – Allegretto vivace – Tempo I – Presto – Tempo I

III. Allegro energico – Presto
Performed by Roxana Pavel Goldstein, Elizabeth Choi, violins; Elias Goldstein, Sally Chisholm, violas; Jocelyn Butler, cello

Brahms structured the quintet in three movements:

1. Allegro non troppo ma con brio
2. Grave ed appassionato – Allegretto vivace – Tempo I – Presto – Tempo I
3. Allegro energico – Presto

The first movement is in sonata form. The first subject group is in F major, while the second is in A major, the first of the "pervasive mediant relationships" in this work.

The second movement is in double variation form. The first theme is based on a sarabande Brahms wrote in 1854, while the second theme is based on a gavotte that he wrote in the same year. The movement starts in C♯ major, and ends in A major, another mediant relationship.

The third movement is a fusion of sonata and contrapuntal forms. The final key of the previous movement, A major, and the key of this movement, F major, represent another mediant relationship.

Brahms described the quintet to his friend Clara Schumann as "one of [his] finest works" and told Simrock, "You have never before had such a beautiful work from me."
