= String Quintet No. 3 (Mozart) =

1787 composition by W. A. Mozart

String Quintet
- No. 3
- by W. A. Mozart
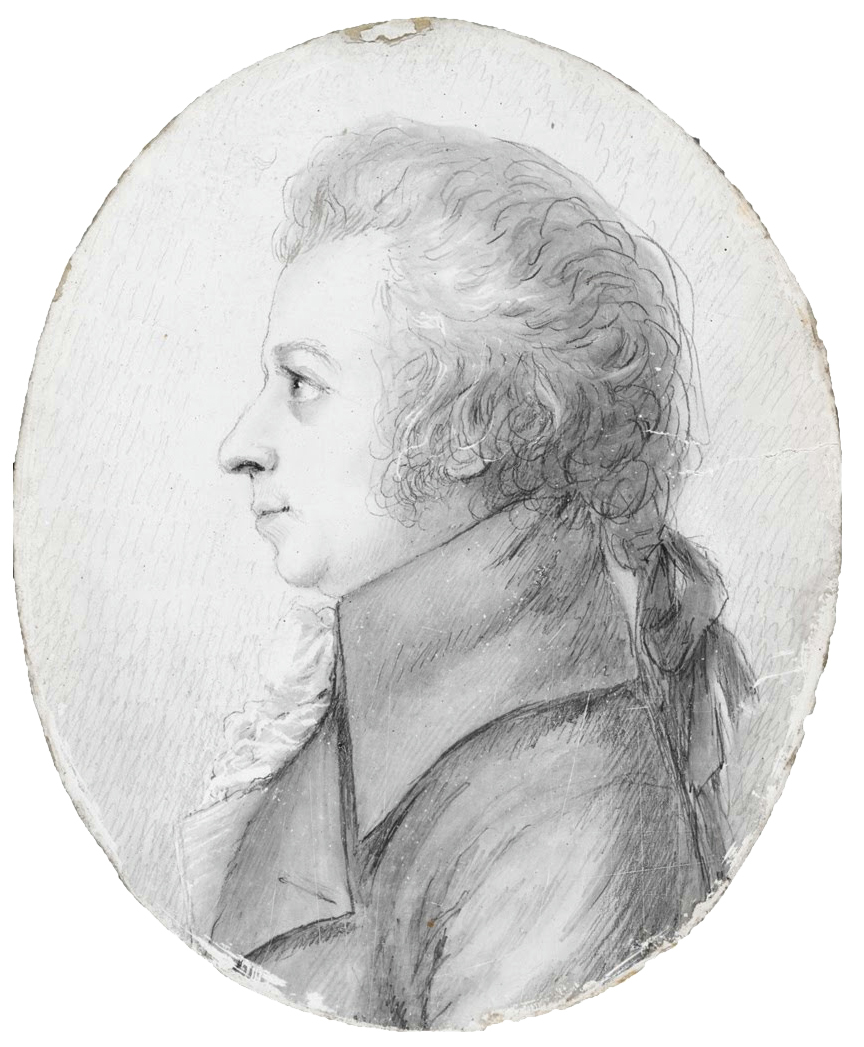
- 1789 miniature of Mozart
- Key: C major
- Catalogue: K. 515
- Composed: 1787
- Movements: 4
- Scoring: 2 violins; 2 violas; cello

The String Quintet No. 3 in C major, K. 515 was written by Wolfgang Amadeus Mozart. Like all of Mozart's string quintets, it is a "viola quintet" in that it is scored for string quartet and an extra viola (two violins, two violas and cello).

The work was completed on 19 April 1787, less than a month before the completion of his stormy G Minor Quintet, K. 516. This would not be the last time that a great pair of C major/G minor works of the same form would be published in close proximity and assigned consecutive Köchel numbers. The following year, the 40th (G minor) and 41st (C major) symphonies would be completed within a few weeks of each other.

== Movements ==
The work is in standard four movement form, though published with the middle movements in reverse order, the Minuet movement preceding the 'slow' movement:

1. Allegro in C major
2. Menuetto: Allegretto 3/4 in C major, with trio in F major
3. Andante 3/4 in F major
4. Molto Allegro 2/4 in C major

Mozart's final intentions on movement order are not entirely known, and both orders are common amongst chamber musicians.

The first movement is massive in scope. Indeed, it is the largest "sonata-allegro" movement before Beethoven, usually taking about a quarter of an hour to perform.

== Influence ==
This quintet inspired Schubert to write his own string quintet in the same key (his scoring involves two cellos rather than two violas as in Mozart's quintet). The opening theme of Schubert's work retained many of the characteristics of Mozart's opening theme, such as decorative turns, irregular phrase lengths, and rising staccato arpeggios (the latter appear only in Schubert's recapitulation).

The influence can also be found in Johann Nepomuk Hummel's Bassoon Concerto in F. In the third movement, one can easily find the similarity in the same rondo theme.

== Notes ==
Sources

- Rosen, Charles (1997). The Classical Style: Haydn, Mozart, Beethoven, New York: W. W. Norton. ISBN 0-393-00653-0.
- Rosen, Charles (2003). "Schubert and the example of Mozart", in Brian Newbould [ed.], Schubert the Progressive: History, Performance Practice, Analysis, Ashgate.
