= String Quintet No. 5 (Mozart) =

1790 composition by W. A. Mozart

String Quintet
- No. 5
- by W. A. Mozart
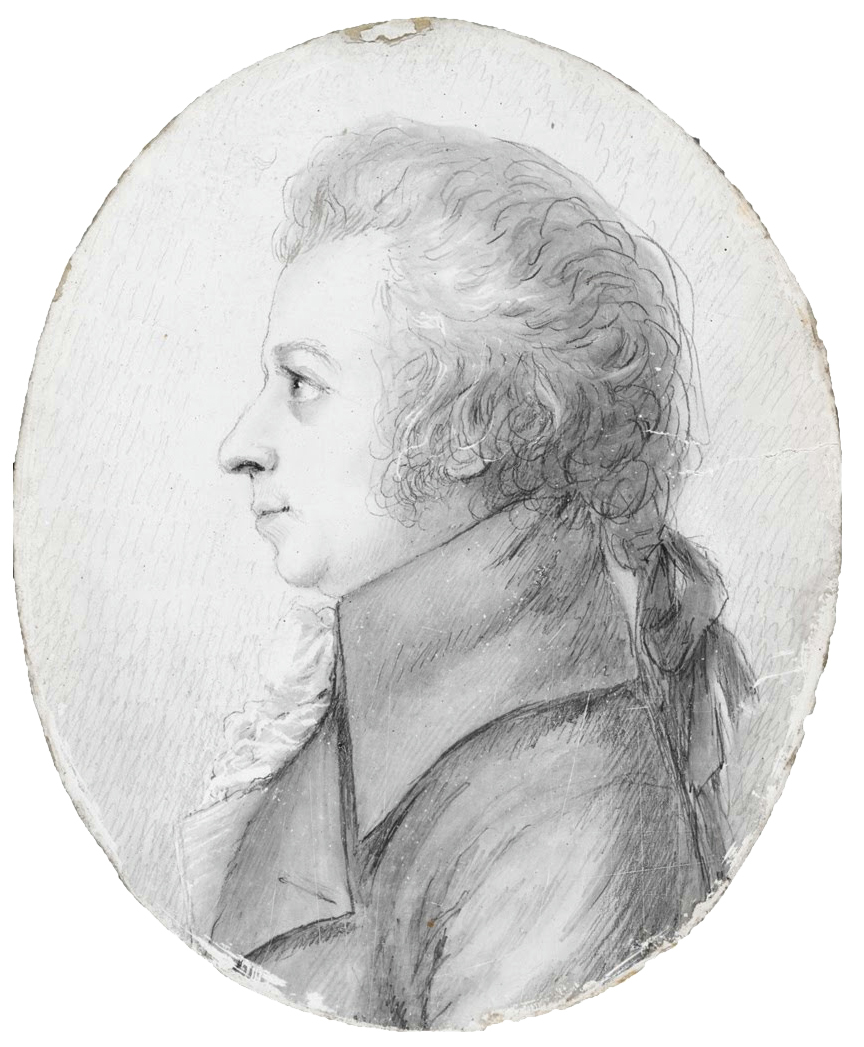
- 1789 miniature of Mozart
- Key: D major
- Catalogue: K. 593
- Composed: 1790
- Movements: 4
- Scoring: 2 violins; 2 violas; cello

The String Quintet No. 5 in D major, K. 593 was written by Wolfgang Amadeus Mozart in 1790. Like all of Mozart's string quintets, it is a "viola quintet" in that it is scored for string quartet and an extra viola (two violins, two violas and cello).

== Movements ==
The work is in standard four movement form:

1. Larghetto 3/4 – Allegro – Larghetto 3/4 – Primo Tempo
2. Adagio 3/4 in G major
3. Menuetto: Allegretto 3/4 – Trio
4. Allegro 6/8

According to the Neue Mozart-Ausgabe, the finale was printed, and known for some time, in an inauthentic edition, in which its main theme, originally a descending chromatic scale fragment, was replaced in most of its appearances in the movement by a more complicated zigzag ("Zickzackform") theme.
