= String Quintet No. 1 (Mozart) =

1773 composition by W. A. Mozart

String Quintet
- No. 1
- by W. A. Mozart
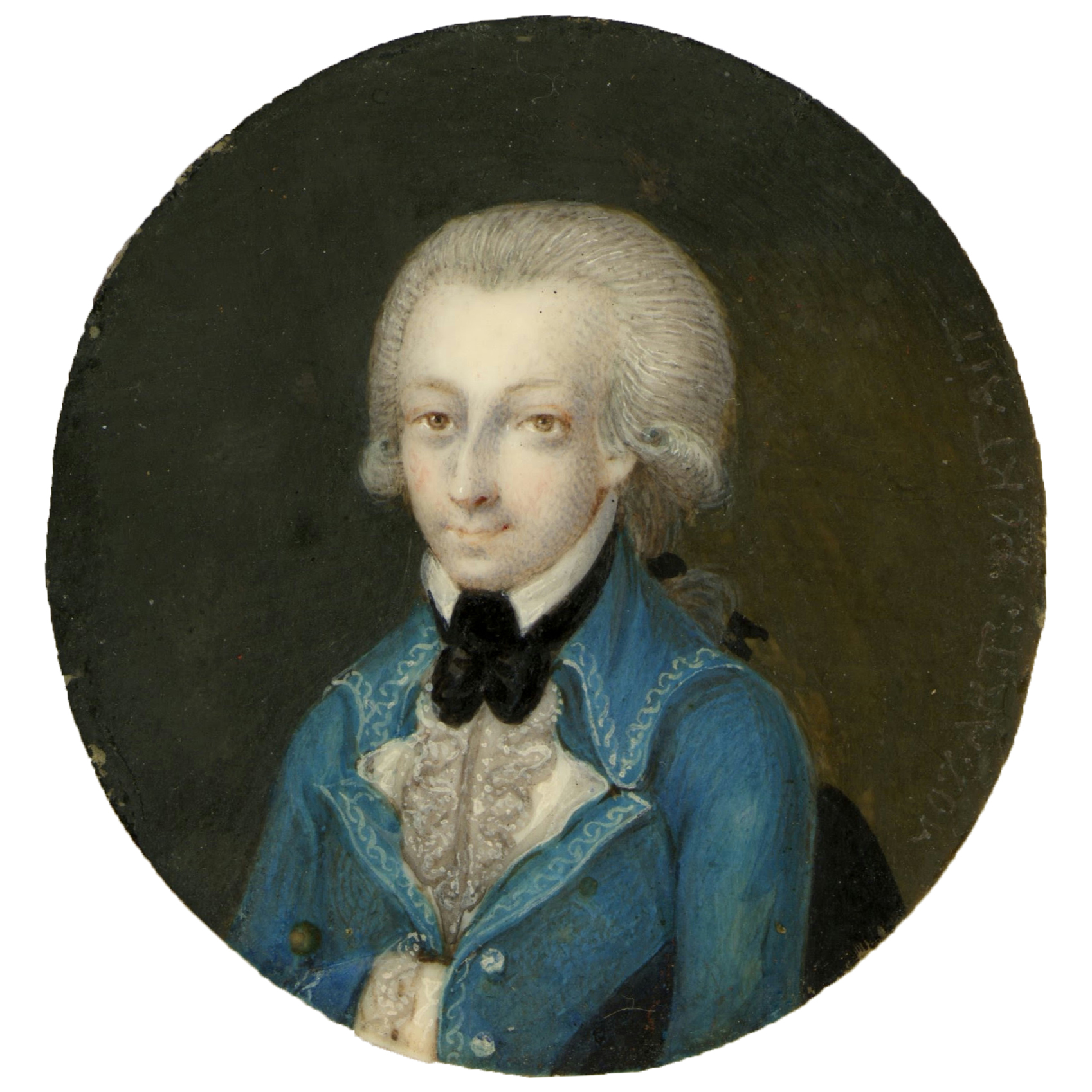
- 1773 miniature of Mozart
- Key: B♭ major
- Catalogue: K. 174
- Composed: 1773
- Movements: 4
- Scoring: 2 violins; 2 violas; cello

The String Quintet No. 1 in B♭ major, K. 174, was written by Wolfgang Amadeus Mozart in December 1773. Mozart composed this quintet a few months following the composition of the Viennese Quartets, K. 168–173 – indeed this work immediately follows that set in the first edition of the Köchel catalogue. Cliff Eisen points out that the work's proportions are unusual – apart from the second movement, the quintet is written on a significantly larger scale than any of Mozart's previous instrumental music. It was first published in 1798 by the Viennese publisher Johann Traeg.

Unlike Mozart's other viola quintets, which are scored for two violins, two violas and cello, this early work is scored for two violins, two violas with a lower part labelled "Basso". It is inspired by Michael Haydn viola quintets in C major (MH 187) and G major (MH 189), written earlier in the same year. Stanley Sadie discusses the theory that Mozart composed the work inspired by the first of Michael Haydn's quintets, and then, after discovering the second, replaced the trio of the minuet movement and rewrote the finale. Sadie points out that the whole quintet is written on the same batch of paper, and that there is no evidence of such a two-stage compositional process. Although Michael Haydn's works were composed with a double bass in mind, Sadie maintains that although Mozart designated the lowest part Basso, it is clear from the compass of the part, and the occasional athleticism that the cello was the intended instrument.

This was Mozart's first work to use five instrumental voices rather than four, which presented him with the problem of what to do with the extra voice. Mozart's answers to the problem, Sadie says, are ingenious : like Haydn, he used the extra viola as a tenor voice, but he also treats the violins and violas as paired voices over a neutral bass, or divides the ensemble into two harmonically self-sufficient groups, one high and the other low. That is, all the compositional devices that are used in the later quintets are present in this first one.

== Movements ==
The work is in standard four movement form:

1. Allegro moderato
2. Adagio in E♭ major
3. Menuetto ma allegro (Note: or 'allegretto') 3/4 in B♭ major, Trio in F major
4. Allegro 2/4
