= Viola Sonata (Mendelssohn) =

Viola Sonata in C minor
- by Felix Mendelssohn
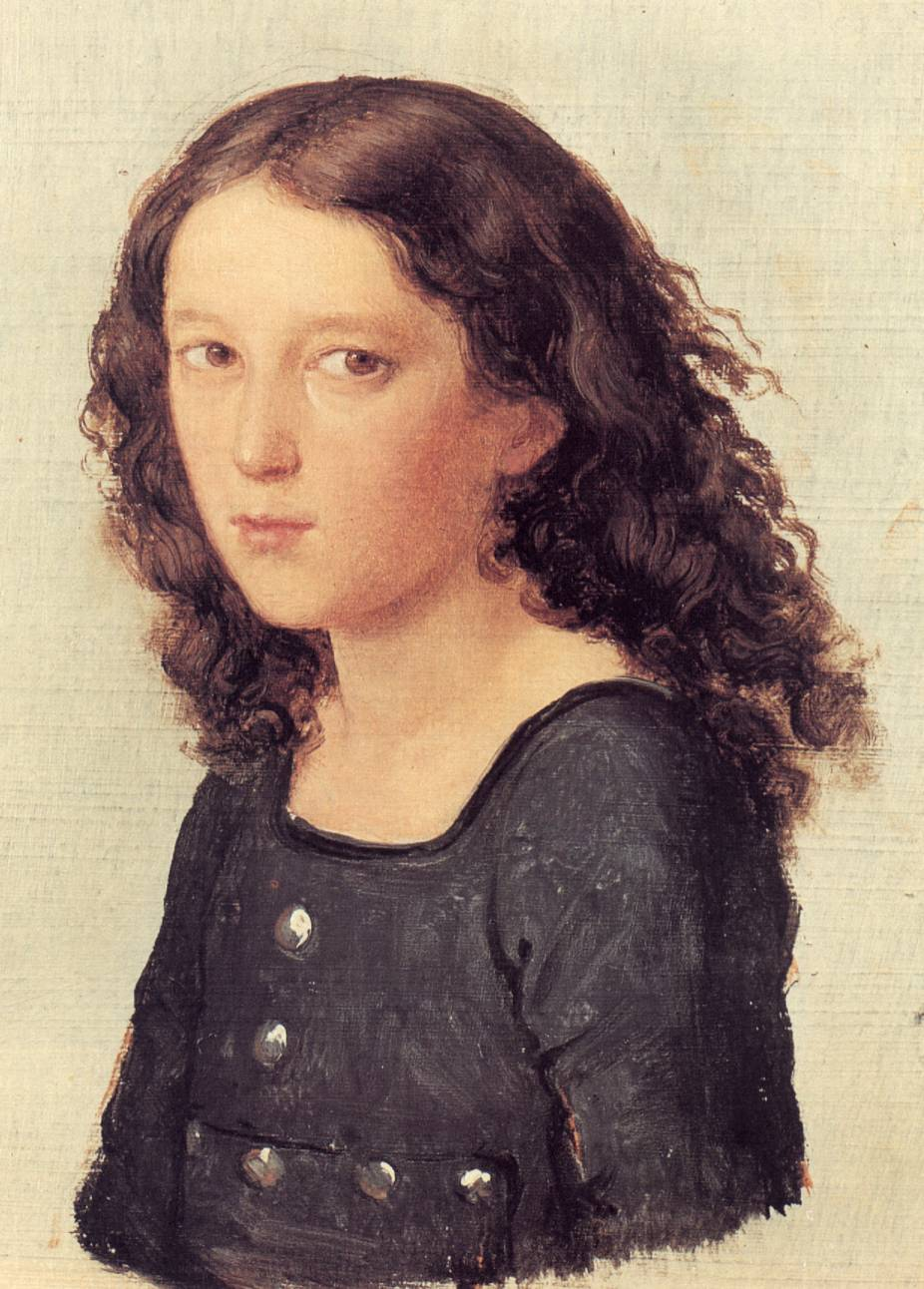
- The composer in 1821
- Catalogue: MWV Q 14
- Composed: 14 February 1824
- Movements: three

Felix Mendelssohn composed his Viola Sonata in C minor, MWV Q 14, when he was only 14 years old. The autograph score is dated 14 February 1824. The work was not published in Mendelssohn's lifetime — in fact not until 1966 — and it was not assigned an opus number. Although he did reuse one of the themes from the minuet movement in the equivalent movement of his First Symphony.

Mendelssohn himself was an accomplished violinist and violist, playing one of the viola parts in an early performance of his own String Octet, and was fully aware of the difficulties of writing for the viola. Since the sonata was not published for over 140 years, the first sonata specifically for the modern viola to be published may have been by Karl Ernst Naumann, who was born in 1832, after this sonata was written.

== Movements ==
The sonata has three movements:

1. Adagio – Allegro
2. Menuetto - Allegro molto
3. Andante con variazioni

A typical performance lasts just under 25 minutes.
