= Symphony No. 1 (Mendelssohn) =

1824 work by Felix Mendelssohn Bartholdy

Symphony No. 1 in C minor
- by Felix Mendelssohn
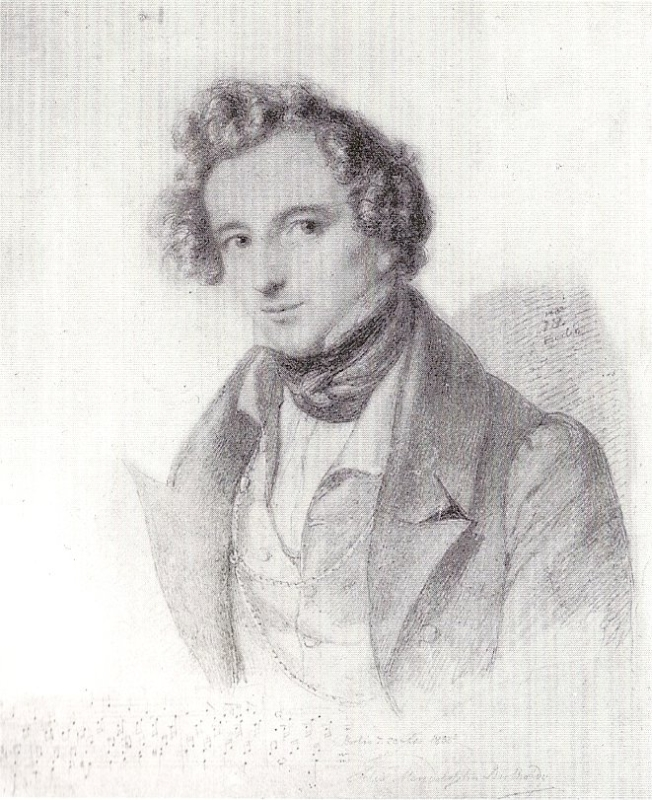
- Drawing of the composer by Eduard Bendemann, 1833
- Key: C minor
- Opus: 11
- Composed: 1824
- Dedication: Philharmonic Society
- Performed: 14 November 1824 privately 1 February 1827 publicly
- Published: 1831
- Movements: four

Symphony No. 1 in C minor, Op. 11, is a work by Felix Mendelssohn, completed on 31 March 1824, when the composer was only 15 years old. The autograph score was published in 1831.

== History ==
The work premièred at a private gathering on 14 November 1824 to honor his sister Fanny Mendelssohn's 19th birthday. Its public première occurred on 1 February 1827, with the Leipzig Gewandhaus Orchestra performing.

=== London première ===
The symphony was dedicated to the Philharmonic Society, who performed the London première on May 25, 1829 with Mendelssohn conducting. Mendelssohn orchestrated the scherzo from his Octet Op. 20 as an alternative third movement for this performance, which is occasionally played alongside or in place of the Menuetto.

The London première was reviewed in The Harmonicon:

... though only about one or two-and-twenty years of age, he has already produced several works of magnitude, which, if at all to be compared with the present, ought, without such additional claim, to rank him among the first composers of the age.... Fertility of invention and novelty of effect, are what first strike the hearers of M. Mendelssohn's symphony; but at the same time, the melodiousness of its subjects, the vigour with which these are supported, the gracefulness of the slow movement, the playfulness of some parts, and the energy of others, are all felt.... The author conducted it in person, and it was received with acclamations....

== Instrumentation ==
The work is scored for two flutes, two oboes, two clarinets in B♭, two bassoons, two horns in E♭ and/or C, two trumpets in C, timpani in C, G, and strings.

== Movements ==
External audio
- Performed by the Berlin Philharmonic under Herbert von Karajan
- I. Allegro di molto
- II. Andante
- III. Menuetto (Allegro molto)
- IV. Allegro con fuoco

The symphony is in four movements:

1. Allegro di molto (C minor, 4/4, sonata form)
2. Andante (E♭ major, 3/4, loose sonata form)
3. Menuetto: Allegro molto (C minor, 6/4, compound ternary form, with a trio initially in A♭ major. Compared to the standard minuet & trio form, there is an additional transition to the main minuet after the binary form trio section.) The movement uses a theme borrowed from the second movement of Mendelssohn's Viola Sonata, composed a year prior, which shares the same tempo marking.
4. Allegro con fuoco (C minor, 4/4, sonata form, ending in C major. The primary theme of which bears a striking resemblance to the final movement of Wolfgang Amadeus Mozart's Symphony No. 40.)

A typical performance lasts approximately half an hour.

== Arrangements ==
An arrangement by Mendelssohn himself for piano four hands, violin and cello exists, and has been recorded by the Duo Tal & Groethuysen with Oliver Wille (violin) and Mikayel Hakhnazaryan (cello).
