= Die Deutsche Liturgie =

1846 composition by Felix Mendelssohn

- Sacred motets by Felix Mendelssohn
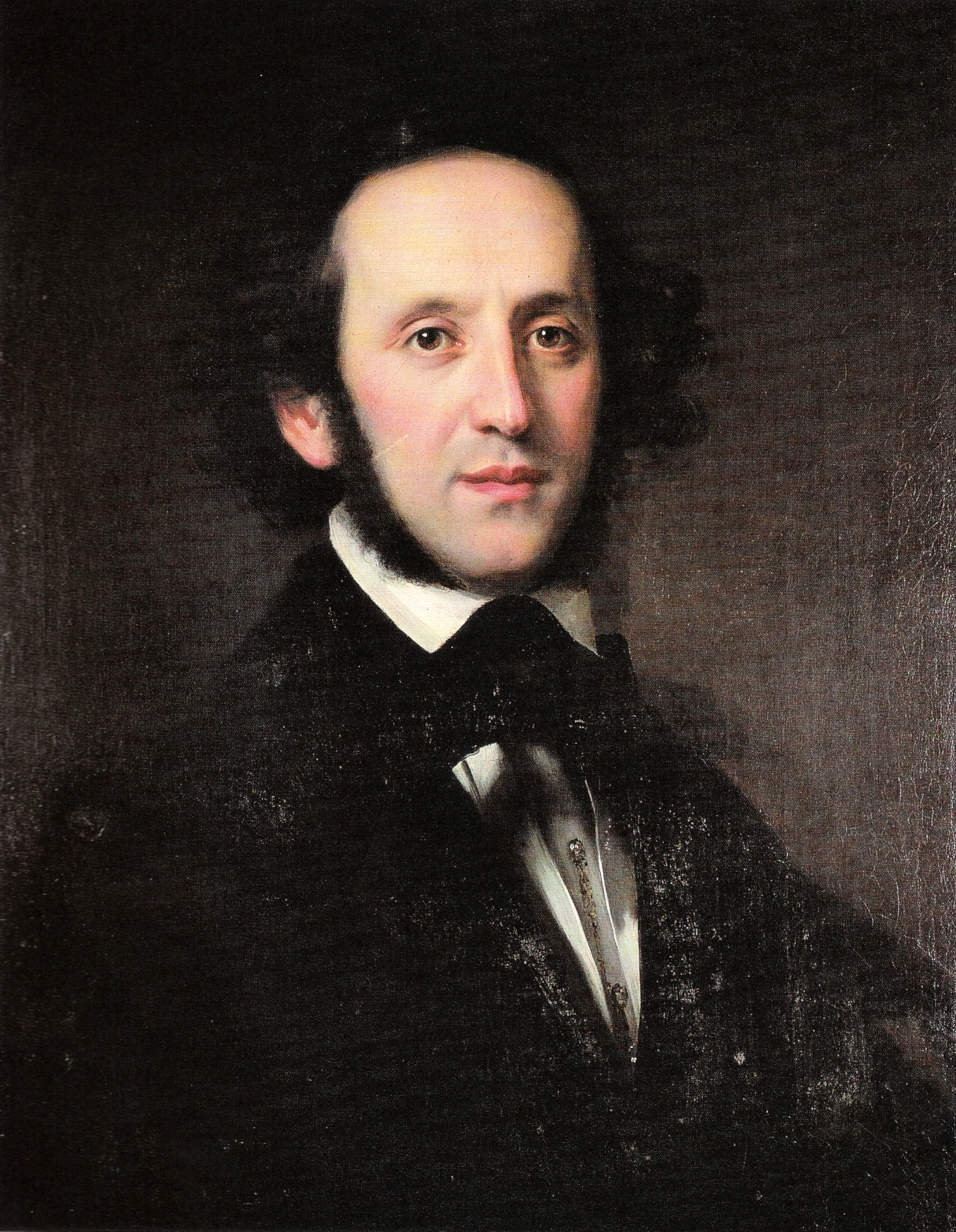
- The composer in 1846, portrait by Eduard Magnus
- English: The German Liturgy
- Catalogue: MWV B 57
- Text: Ordinary of Protestant services
- Language: German
- Composed: 1846
- Published: 1875
- Movements: 10
- Scoring: double choir SATB SATB

Die Deutsche Liturgie, MWV B 57, is a collection of musical settings of the ten sung elements in the Protestant liturgy, composed by Felix Mendelssohn for double choir a cappella. He wrote it in 1846 for the Berlin Cathedral, on a request by the emperor, Friedrich Wilhelm IV of Prussia. It was published by Breitkopf & Härtel in 1875 in the complete edition of the composer's works.

== History ==
Mendelssohn composed Die Deutsche Liturgie in 1846 for the choir of the Berlin Cathedral which he conducted from 1843. Emperor Friedrich Wilhelm IV of Prussia requested a setting of the regular parts of Protestant church services at the time, defined by the Agende für die evangelische Kirche in den Königlich Preußischen Landen given in Berlin in 1829. It compares to the Catholic mass ordinary, sharing with it the parts Kyrie, Gloria and Sanctus.

The work did not become used regularly in church service, as intended. It was published in 1875 in the complete edition of the composer's works by Breitkopf & Härtel. In 1997, the liturgy was published in a critical edition by Carus-Verlag in 1997, claiming that was the first complete edition in proper liturgical order.

== Text ==
Die Deutsche Liturgie contains ten pieces that were regularly sung in Protestant services at Mendelssohn's time:

1. Amen
2. Ehre sei dem Vater (doxology)
3. Kyrie
4. Ehre sei Gott in der Höhe (Gloria)
5. Und mit deinem Geiste
6. Amen (after collection)
7. Alleluja (Hallelujah)
8. Amen (after the Gospel reading)
9. Amen (after the profession of faith)
10. Heilig Sanctus

The music is set for unaccompanied double choir, SATB SATB. The Kyrie is written in A major and common time, marked Andante sostenuto. It has been described as "of angelic purity". While it uses the traditional Greek text, the Gloria is in German, "Ehre sei Gott in der Höhe". The opening is supposed to be sung by the cantor, and the choir begins with "Und Friede auf Erden" ("And peace on Earth"), in common time and marked Andante con moto. The Sanctus is again in German, "Heilig, heilig, heilig" (Holy ...), in alla breve time and marked Con moto.

== Performance and recording ==
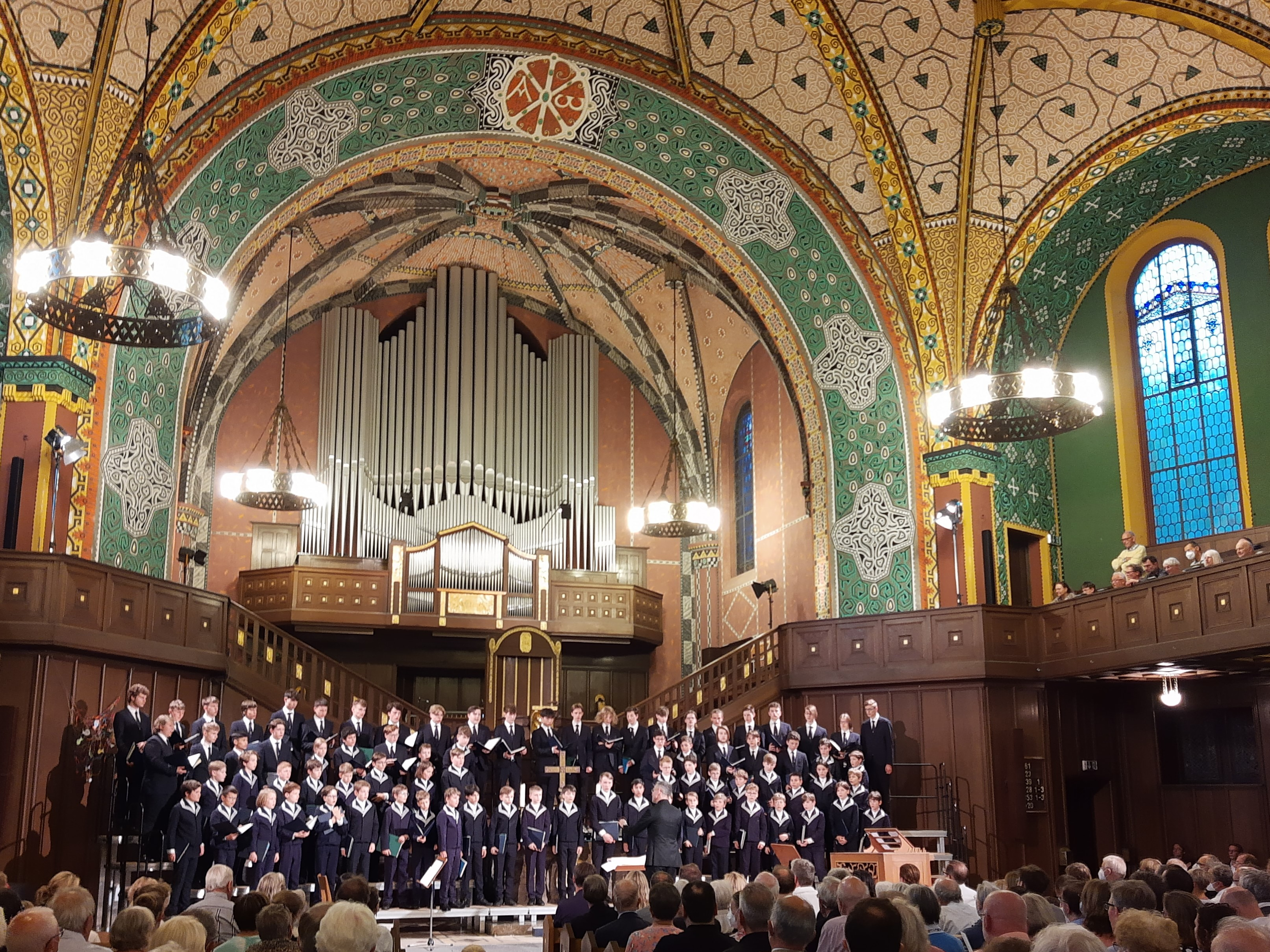
Thomanerchor at Lutherkirche, Wiesbaden, 2022

In connection with the Carus publication, three pieces from Die Deutsche Liturgie, Kyrie, Gloria and Sanctus, were recorded in 1996 by the Kammerchor Stuttgart, conducted by Frieder Bernius. A reviewer noted that he was "struck by the captivating performance and the beautifully blended tone" from the choir.

The parts Kyrie and Gloria were on the program when Andreas Reize, Bach's 18th successor as Thomaskantor conducting the Thomanerchor, programmed the choir's entry at Deutsches Chorfest 2022 at the Thomaskirche in Leipzig, broadcast by Deutschlandfunk, and also the choir's first concert tour after the COVID-19 pandemic. It was presented in Leipzig and, among others, at Merseburg Cathedral and at the Lutherkirche in Wiesbaden as part of the Rheingau Musik Festival. A reviewer from the Frankfurter Rundschau regarded the pieces as a first highlight of the concert, and noted a "captivating purity in the tone of devotional Reformation romanticism" ("bestrickender Reinheit im Ton andächtiger Reformationsromantik").
