= String symphonies (Mendelssohn) =

Musical work by Felix Mendelssohn

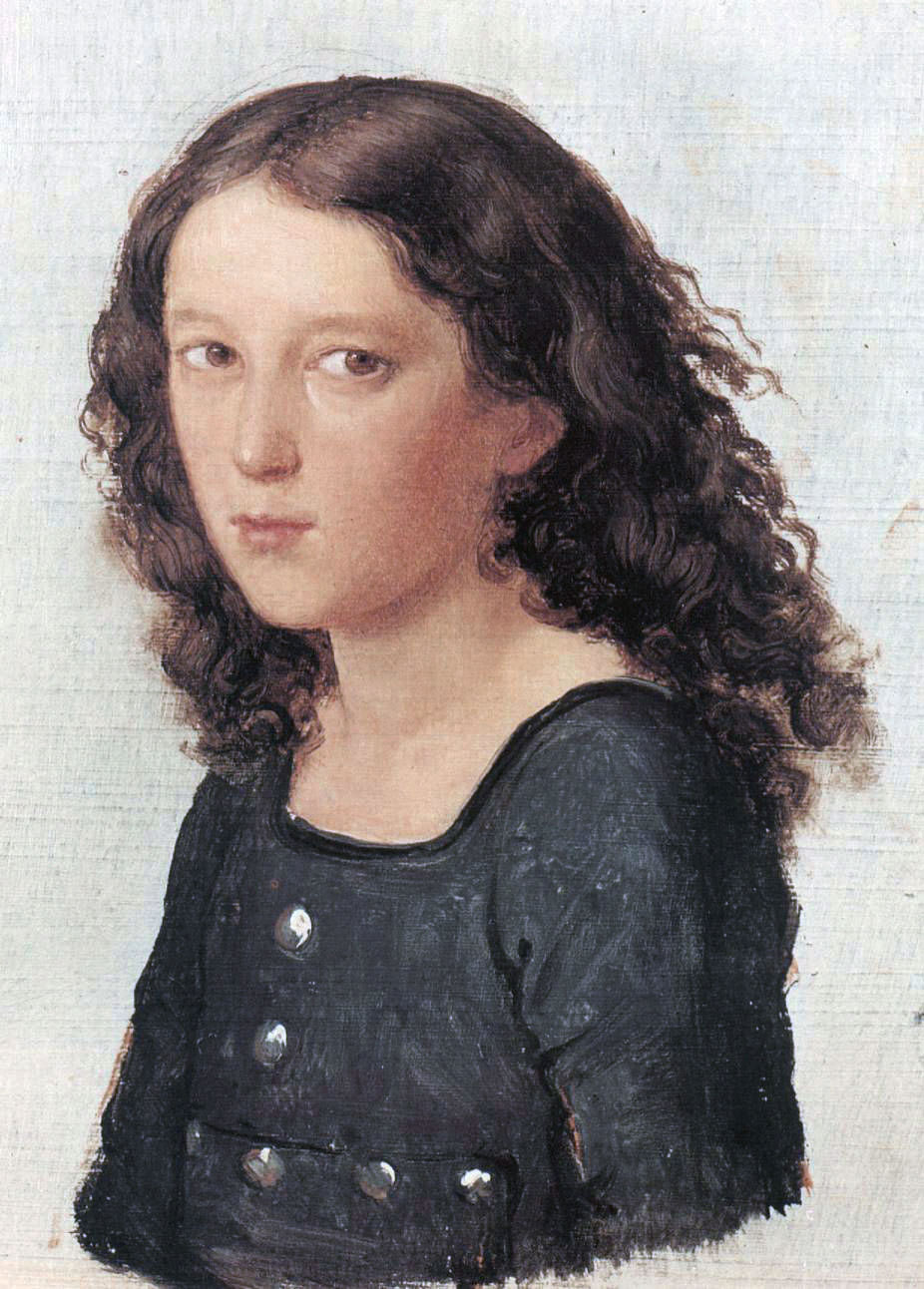
Felix Mendelssohn aged 12 (1821) by Carl Joseph Begas

Felix Mendelssohn wrote thirteen string symphonies between 1821 and 1823, when he was between 12 and 14 years old. (For his mature symphonies, see here). These symphonies were tributes to Classical symphonies especially by Joseph Haydn, Carl Philipp Emanuel Bach, and Wolfgang Amadeus Mozart.

== Instrumentation ==
The symphonies are written for a string orchestra. String Symphony No. 11 also contains percussion (timpani, triangle, cymbals) in the second movement. No. 8 exists in two forms: the original for string orchestra, and an arrangement that Mendelssohn wrote that added woodwinds, brass, and timpani. The work is scored for two flutes, two oboes, two clarinets, two bassoons, two horns, two trumpets, timpani in D and A, and strings. (A typical performance lasts half an hour).

Symphonies 1 to 7 are the less "symphonic" and more relatable to the classical Divertimento (in the model of Mozart's KV 136, 137 and 138). From n.º 8 on, we find a more sophisticated writing, probably influenced by Mendelssohn's study on the organistic repertoire. The whole of Symphonies 9, 10 and 13 and some movements in n.º 8, 11 and 12 ask for two viola sections, a forgotten feature since the baroque period.

== Structure ==
The string symphonies nos. 1-6 and 12 were composed in three movements. Nos. 7, 8 and 9 have four movements, nos. 10 and 13 have one movement, and no. 11 is in five movements.

== Symphonies ==
=== No. 1 in C major, MWV N 1 ===
String Symphony No. 1 in C major, MWV N 1
I. Allegro

II. Andante

III. Allegro
Performed by the New York Classical Players

There are three movements:

1. Allegro
2. Andante
3. Allegro

=== No. 2 in D major, MWV N 2 ===
There are three movements:

1. Allegro
2. Andante
3. Allegro vivace

=== No. 3 in E minor, MWV N 3 ===
There are three movements:

1. Allegro di molto
2. Andante
3. Allegro

=== No. 4 in C minor, MWV N 4 ===
There are three movements:

1. Grave – Allegro
2. Andante
3. Allegro vivace

=== No. 5 in B♭ major, MWV N 5 ===
There are three movements:

1. Allegro vivace
2. Andante
3. Presto

=== No. 6 in E♭ major, MWV N 6 ===
There are three movements:

1. Allegro
2. Menuetto
3. Prestissimo

=== No. 7 in D minor, MWV N 7 ===
There are four movements:

1. Allegro
2. Andante amorevole
3. Menuetto
4. Allegro molto

=== No. 8 in D major, MWV N 8 (two versions, one for strings and another with winds) ===
There are four movements:

1. Adagio e grave – Allegro
2. Adagio
3. Menuetto
4. Allegro molto

=== No. 9 in C major, MWV N 9 ===
There are four movements:

1. Grave – Allegro
2. Andante
3. Scherzo
4. Allegro vivace

=== No. 10 in B minor, MWV N 10 ===
There is one movement:

1. Adagio – Allegro – Piu presto

=== No. 11 in F major, MWV N 11 ===
String Symphony No. 11 in F major, MWV N 11
I. Adagio – Allegro molto

II. Scherzo comodo. Schweizerlied (Swiss Song)

III. Adagio

Menuetto: Allegro moderato – Trio

V. Allegro molto
Performed by the Seoul Philharmonic Orchestra

There are five movements:

1. Adagio – Allegro molto
2. Scherzo comodo. Schweizerlied (Swiss Song)
3. Adagio
4. Menuetto: Allegro moderato – Trio
5. Allegro molto

=== No. 12 in G minor, MWV N 12 ===
There are three movements:

1. Fuga: Grave – Allegro
2. Andante
3. Allegro molto

=== No. 13 Symphoniesatz, MWV N 14 ===
Mendelssohn sketched out a 13th string symphony, called Symphoniesatz ("symphonic movement"). This Grave – Allegro molto is in C minor.
