= Felix Mendelssohn =

German composer (1809–1847)

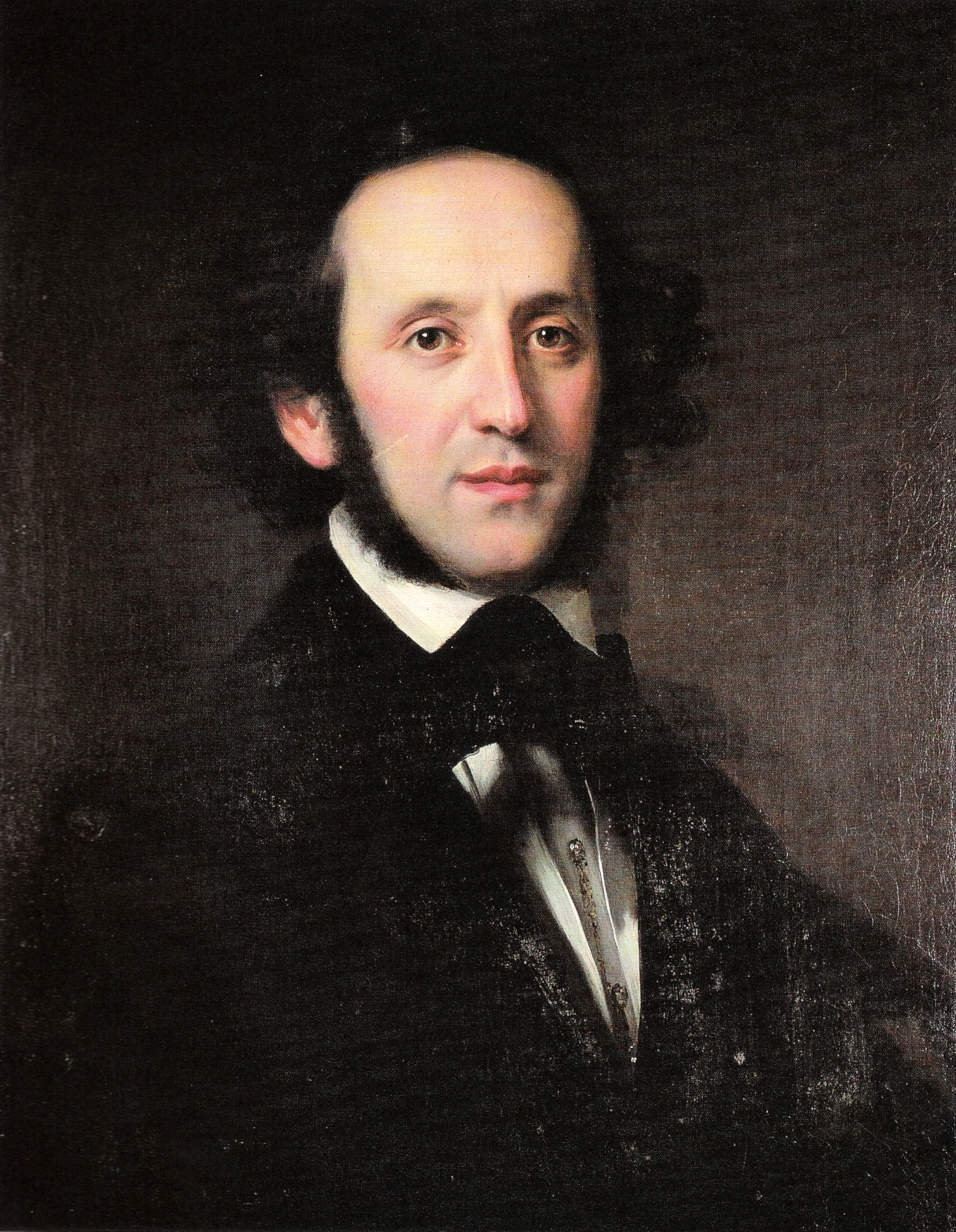
- Born: 3 February 1809; Hamburg
- Died: 4 November 1847 (aged 38); Leipzig
- Occupations: Composer; pianist; organist; conductor
- Works: List of compositions

Signature
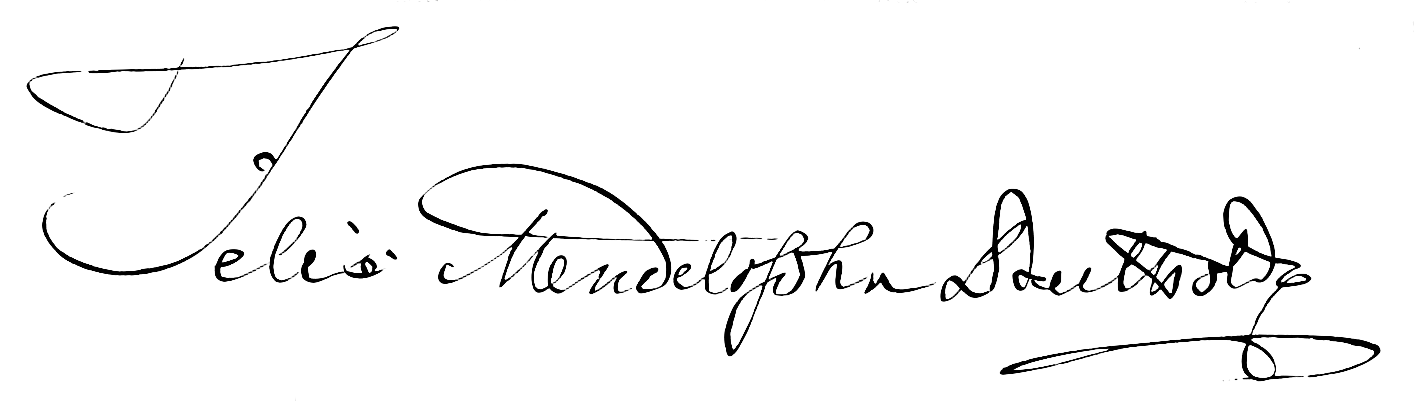

Jakob Ludwig Felix Mendelssohn Bartholdy (Note: /ˈmɛndəlsən, -zoʊn/ MEN-dəl-sən, -zohn; German: [ˈjaːkɔp ˈluːtvɪç ˈfeːlɪks ˈmɛndl̩szoːn baʁˈtɔldi]) (3 February 1809 – 4 November 1847), simply known as Felix Mendelssohn, (Note: The overwhelming majority of printed sources in English (e.g. see sources in references, and listings of recordings), use the form "Mendelssohn" and not "Mendelssohn Bartholdy". The Grove Dictionary of Music and Musicians gives "(Jakob Ludwig) Felix Mendelssohn(-Bartholdy)" as the entry title, with "Mendelssohn" used in the body text. In German and some other languages, the surname "Mendelssohn Bartholdy" (sometimes hyphenated) is generally used.) was a German composer, pianist, organist and conductor of the early Romantic era. Mendelssohn's compositions include symphonies, concertos, piano music, organ music and chamber music. His best-known works include the String Octet, the overture and incidental music for A Midsummer Night's Dream (which includes his "Wedding March"), the Italian and Scottish Symphonies, the oratorios St. Paul and Elijah, the Hebrides Overture, the mature Violin Concerto, and the melody used in the Christmas carol "Hark! The Herald Angels Sing". Mendelssohn's Songs Without Words are his most famous solo piano compositions.

Mendelssohn's grandfather was the Jewish philosopher Moses Mendelssohn, but Felix was initially raised without religion until he was baptised aged seven into the Reformed Christian church. He was recognised early as a musical prodigy, but his parents were cautious and did not seek to capitalise on his talent. His sister Fanny received a similar musical education and was a talented composer and pianist in her own right; some of her early songs were published under her brother's name and her Easter Sonata was for a time mistakenly attributed to him after being lost and rediscovered in the 1970s.

Mendelssohn enjoyed early success in Germany, and revived interest in the music of Johann Sebastian Bach, notably with his performance of the St Matthew Passion in 1829. He became well received in his travels throughout Europe as a composer, conductor and soloist; his ten visits to Britain – during which many of his major works were premiered – form an important part of his adult career. His essentially conservative musical tastes set him apart from more adventurous musical contemporaries, such as Franz Liszt, Richard Wagner, Charles-Valentin Alkan and Hector Berlioz. The Leipzig Conservatory, which he founded, became a bastion of this anti-radical outlook.

After a long period of relative denigration due to changing musical tastes and antisemitism in the late 19th and early 20th centuries, his creative originality has been re-evaluated. He is now among the most popular composers of the Romantic era.

== Life ==
=== Childhood ===
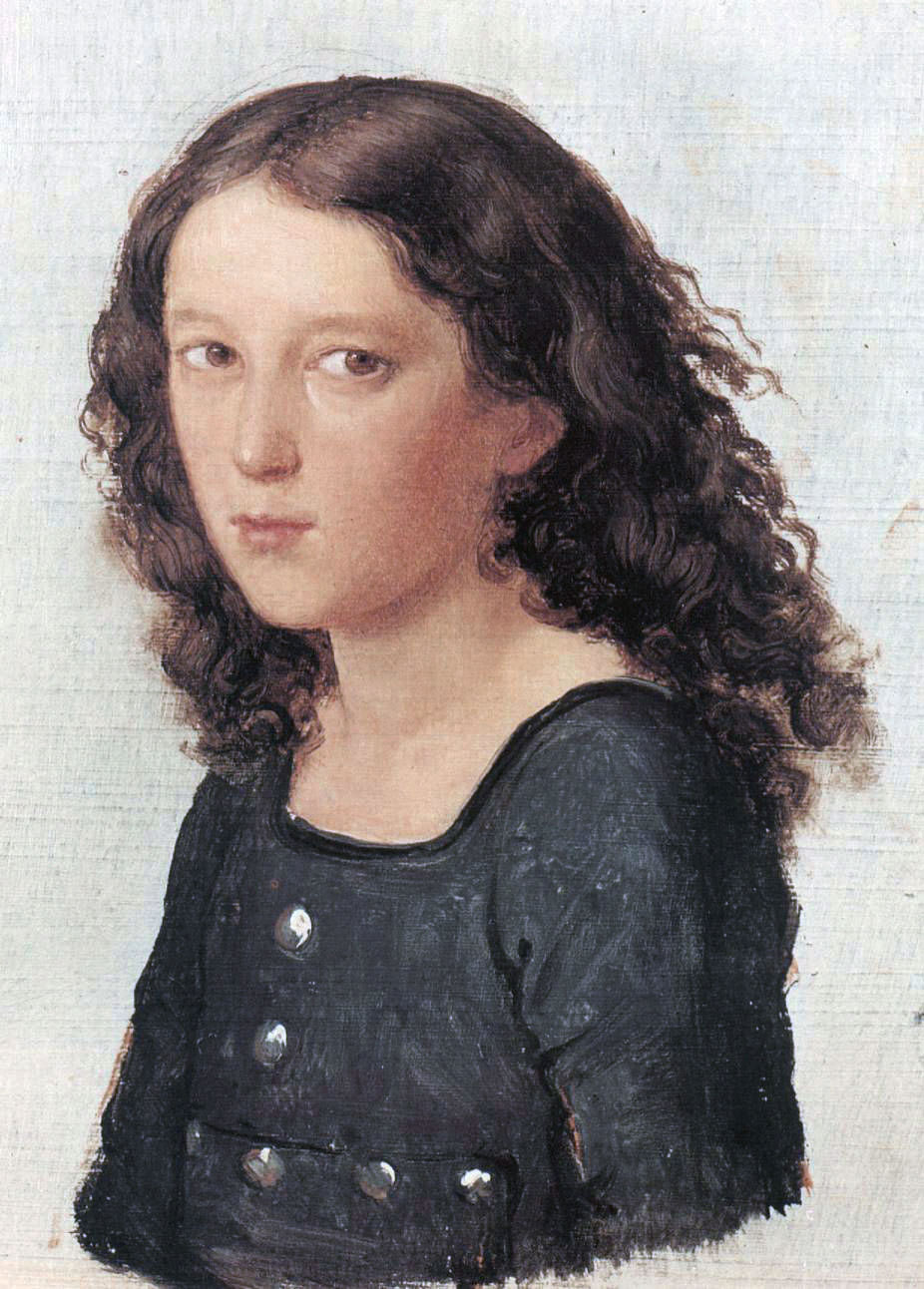
Felix Mendelssohn aged 12 (1821) by Carl Joseph Begas

Felix Mendelssohn was born on 3 February 1809, in Hamburg, at the time an independent city-state, (Note: Since 1806 Hamburg had been an independent city, the Free Imperial City of Hamburg; it was annexed to the First French Empire by Napoleon in 1810.) in the same house where, a year later, the dedicatee and first performer of his Violin Concerto, Ferdinand David, would be born. Mendelssohn's father, the banker Abraham Mendelssohn, was the son of the German Jewish philosopher Moses Mendelssohn, whose family was prominent in the German Jewish community. Until his baptism at age seven, Mendelssohn was brought up largely without religion. His mother, Lea Salomon, was a member of the Itzig family and a sister of Jakob Salomon Bartholdy. Mendelssohn was the second of four children; his older sister Fanny also displayed exceptional and precocious musical talent.

The family moved to Berlin in 1811, leaving Hamburg in disguise in fear of French reprisal for the Mendelssohn bank's role in breaking Napoleon's Continental System blockade. Abraham and Lea Mendelssohn sought to give their children – Fanny, Felix, Paul and Rebecka – the best education possible. Fanny became a pianist well known in Berlin musical circles as a composer; originally Abraham had thought that she, rather than Felix, would be the more musical. But it was not considered proper, by either Abraham or Felix, for a woman to pursue a career in music, so she remained an active but non-professional musician. Abraham was initially disinclined to allow Felix to follow a musical career until it became clear that he was seriously dedicated.

Mendelssohn grew up in an intellectual environment. Frequent visitors to the salon organised by his parents at their home in Berlin included artists, musicians and scientists, among them Wilhelm and Alexander von Humboldt, and the mathematician Peter Gustav Lejeune Dirichlet (whom Mendelssohn's sister Rebecka would later marry). The musician Sarah Rothenburg has written of the household that "Europe came to their living room".

=== Surname ===
Abraham Mendelssohn renounced the Jewish religion prior to Felix's birth, and he and his wife decided against having Felix circumcised. Felix and his siblings were at first brought up without religious education; on 21 March 1816, they were baptised in a private ceremony in the family's Berlin apartment by the Reformed Protestant minister of the Jerusalem Church, at which time Felix was given the additional names Jakob Ludwig. Abraham and his wife Lea were baptised in 1822, and formally adopted the surname Mendelssohn Bartholdy (which they had used since 1812) for themselves and for their children.

The name Bartholdy was added at the suggestion of Lea's brother, Jakob Salomon Bartholdy, who had inherited a property of this name in Luisenstadt and adopted it as his own surname. In an 1829 letter to Felix, Abraham explained that adopting the Bartholdy name was meant to demonstrate a decisive break with the traditions of his father Moses: "There can no more be a Christian Mendelssohn than there can be a Jewish Confucius". On embarking on his musical career, Felix did not entirely drop the name Mendelssohn as Abraham had requested, but in deference to his father signed his letters and had his visiting cards printed using the form 'Mendelssohn Bartholdy'. In 1829, his sister Fanny wrote to him of "Bartholdy [...] this name that we all dislike".

=== Career ===
==== Musical education ====
Mendelssohn began taking piano lessons from his mother when he was six, and at seven was tutored by Marie Bigot in Paris. Later in Berlin, all four Mendelssohn children studied piano with Ludwig Berger, who was himself a former student of Muzio Clementi. From at least May 1819, Mendelssohn (initially with his sister Fanny) studied counterpoint and composition with Carl Friedrich Zelter in Berlin. This was an important influence on his future career. Zelter had almost certainly been recommended as a teacher by his aunt Sarah Levy, who had been a pupil of W. F. Bach and a patron of C. P. E. Bach. Sarah Levy displayed some talent as a keyboard player, and often played with Zelter's orchestra at the Berliner Singakademie; she and the Mendelssohn family were among its leading patrons. Sarah had formed an important collection of Bach family manuscripts, which she bequeathed to the Singakademie; Zelter, whose tastes in music were conservative, was also an admirer of the Bach tradition. This undoubtedly played a significant part in forming Felix Mendelssohn's musical tastes, as his works reflect this study of Baroque and early classical music. His fugues and chorales especially reflect a tonal clarity and use of counterpoint reminiscent of Johann Sebastian Bach, whose music influenced him deeply.

==== Early maturity ====
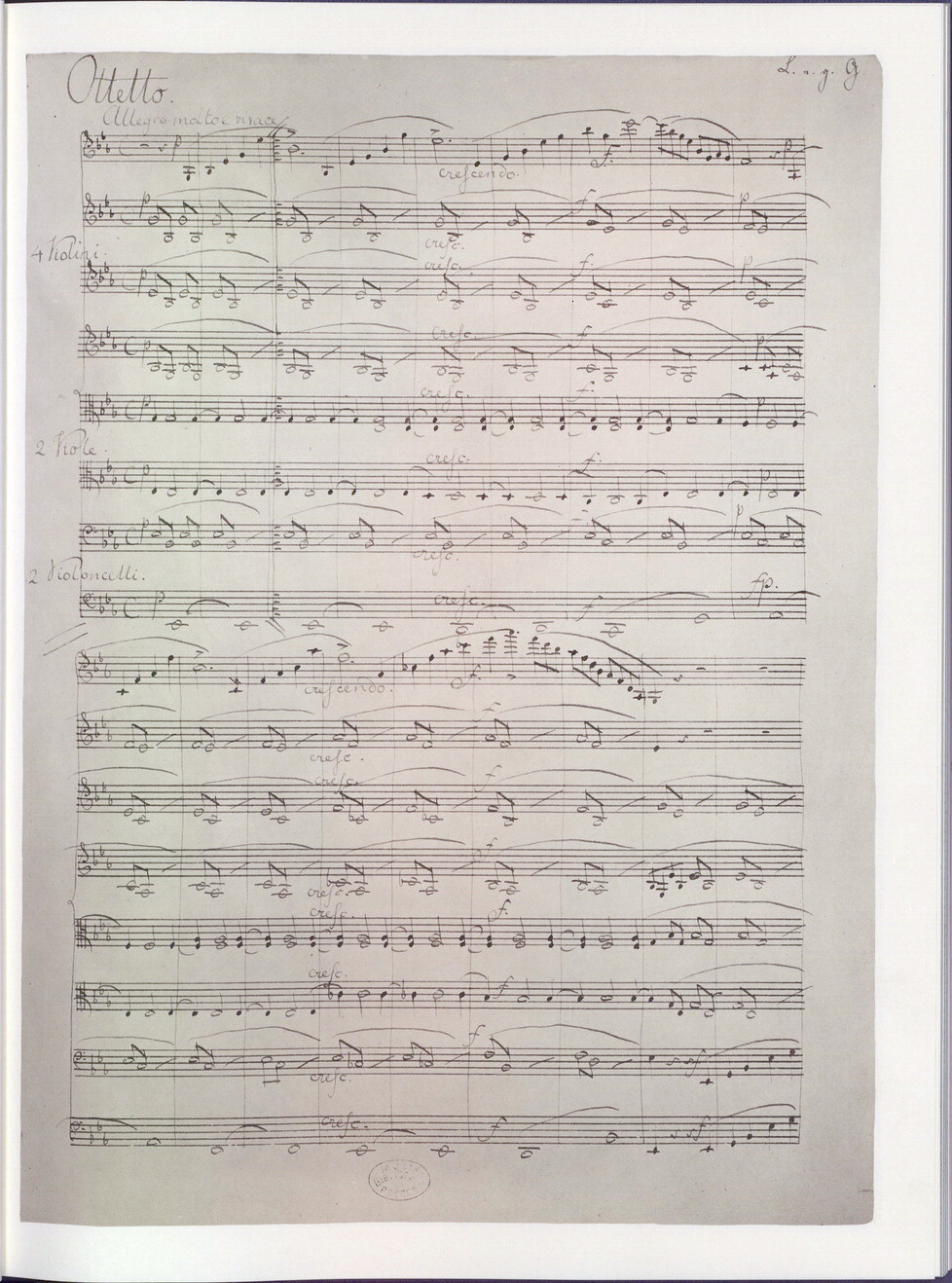
First page of the manuscript of Mendelssohn's Octet (1825)

Mendelssohn probably made his first public concert appearance at the age of nine, when he participated in a chamber music concert accompanying a horn duo. He was a prolific composer from an early age. As an adolescent, his works were often performed at home with a private orchestra for the associates of his wealthy parents amongst the intellectual elite of Berlin. Between the ages of 12 and 14, Mendelssohn wrote 13 string symphonies for such concerts, and a number of chamber works. His first work, a piano quartet, was published when he was 13. It was probably Abraham Mendelssohn who procured the publication of this quartet by the house of Schlesinger. In 1824 the 15-year-old wrote his first symphony for full orchestra (in C minor, Op. 11).

At age 16 Mendelssohn wrote his String Octet in E♭ major, a work which has been regarded as "mark[ing] the beginning of his maturity as a composer." This Octet and his Overture to Shakespeare's A Midsummer Night's Dream, which he wrote a year later in 1826, are the best-known of his early works. (Later, in 1843, he also wrote incidental music for the play, including the famous "Wedding March".) The Overture is perhaps the earliest example of a concert overture – that is, a piece not written deliberately to accompany a staged performance but to evoke a literary theme in performance on a concert platform; this was a genre which became a popular form in musical Romanticism.

In 1824 Mendelssohn studied under the composer and piano virtuoso Ignaz Moscheles, who confessed in his diaries that he had little to teach him. Moscheles and Mendelssohn became close colleagues and lifelong friends. The year 1827 saw the premiere – and sole performance in his lifetime – of Mendelssohn's opera Die Hochzeit des Camacho. The failure of this production left him disinclined to venture into the genre again.

Besides music, Mendelssohn's education included art, literature, languages, and philosophy. He had a particular interest in classical literature and translated Terence's Andria for his tutor Heyse in 1825; Heyse was impressed and had it published in 1826 as a work of "his pupil, F****" [i.e. "Felix" (asterisks as provided in original text)]. (Note: The translation was reprinted by Giovanni Mardersteig at the Officina Bodoni in 1971.) This translation also qualified Mendelssohn to study at the University of Berlin, where from 1826 to 1829 he attended lectures on aesthetics by Georg Wilhelm Friedrich Hegel, on history by Eduard Gans, and on geography by Carl Ritter.

==== Meeting Goethe and conducting Bach ====
In 1821 Zelter introduced Mendelssohn to his friend and correspondent, the writer Johann Wolfgang von Goethe (then in his seventies), who was greatly impressed by the child, leading to perhaps the earliest confirmed comparison with Mozart in the following conversation between Goethe and Zelter:

"Musical prodigies ... are probably no longer so rare; but what this little man can do in extemporizing and playing at sight borders the miraculous, and I could not have believed it possible at so early an age." "And yet you heard Mozart in his seventh year at Frankfurt?" said Zelter. "Yes", answered Goethe, "... but what your pupil already accomplishes, bears the same relation to the Mozart of that time that the cultivated talk of a grown-up person bears to the prattle of a child."

Mendelssohn was invited to meet Goethe on several later occasions, and set a number of Goethe's poems to music. His other compositions inspired by Goethe include the overture Calm Sea and Prosperous Voyage (Op. 27, 1828), and the cantata Die erste Walpurgisnacht (The First Walpurgis Night, Op. 60, 1832).

In 1829, with the backing of Zelter and the assistance of the actor Eduard Devrient, Mendelssohn arranged and conducted a performance in Berlin of Bach's St Matthew Passion. Four years previously, his grandmother, Bella Salomon, had given him a copy of the manuscript of this (by then all-but-forgotten) masterpiece. The orchestra and choir for the performance were provided by the Berlin Singakademie. The success of this performance, one of the very few since Bach's death and the first ever outside of Leipzig, (Note: After Bach's death in 1750, the Passion had been performed a few times until about 1800 by Bach's successors as Thomaskantor in Leipzig.) was the central event in the revival of Bach's music in Germany and, eventually, throughout Europe. It earned Mendelssohn widespread acclaim at the age of 20. It also led to one of the few explicit references which Mendelssohn made to his origins: "To think that it took an actor and a Jew's son to revive the greatest Christian music for the world!"

Over the next few years Mendelssohn travelled widely. His first visit to England was in 1829; other places visited during the 1830s included Vienna, Florence, Milan, Rome and Naples, in all of which he met with local and visiting musicians and artists. These years proved to be the germination for some of his most famous works, including the Hebrides Overture and the Scottish and Italian symphonies.

In Rome, in March 1831, he met the French composer Hector Berlioz and became friends with him. He arrived in Paris on 9 December 1831, where he met the Polish composer and pianist Frédéric Chopin for the first time, as well as the composer-conductor Ferdinand Hiller and the virtuoso Franz Liszt.

==== Düsseldorf ====
On Zelter's death in 1832, Mendelssohn had hopes of succeeding him as conductor of the Singakademie; but at a vote in January 1833 he was defeated for the post by Carl Friedrich Rungenhagen. This may have been because of Mendelssohn's youth, and fear of possible innovations; it was also suspected by some to be attributable to his Jewish ancestry. Following this rebuff, Mendelssohn divided most of his professional time over the next few years between Britain and Düsseldorf, where he was appointed musical director (his first paid post as a musician) in 1833.

In the spring of that year Mendelssohn directed the Lower Rhenish Music Festival in Düsseldorf, beginning with a performance of George Frideric Handel's oratorio Israel in Egypt prepared from the original score, which he had found in London. This precipitated a Handel revival in Germany, similar to the reawakened interest in J. S. Bach following his performance of the St. Matthew Passion. Mendelssohn worked with the dramatist Karl Immermann to improve local theatre standards, and made his first appearance as an opera conductor in Immermann's production of Mozart's Don Giovanni at the end of 1833, where he took umbrage at the audience's protests about the cost of tickets. His frustration at his everyday duties in Düsseldorf, and the city's provincialism, led him to resign his position at the end of 1834. He had offers from both Munich and Leipzig for important musical posts, namely, direction of the Munich Opera, the editorship of the prestigious Leipzig music journal the Allgemeine musikalische Zeitung, and direction of the Leipzig Gewandhaus Orchestra; he accepted the latter in 1835.

==== Leipzig and Berlin ====
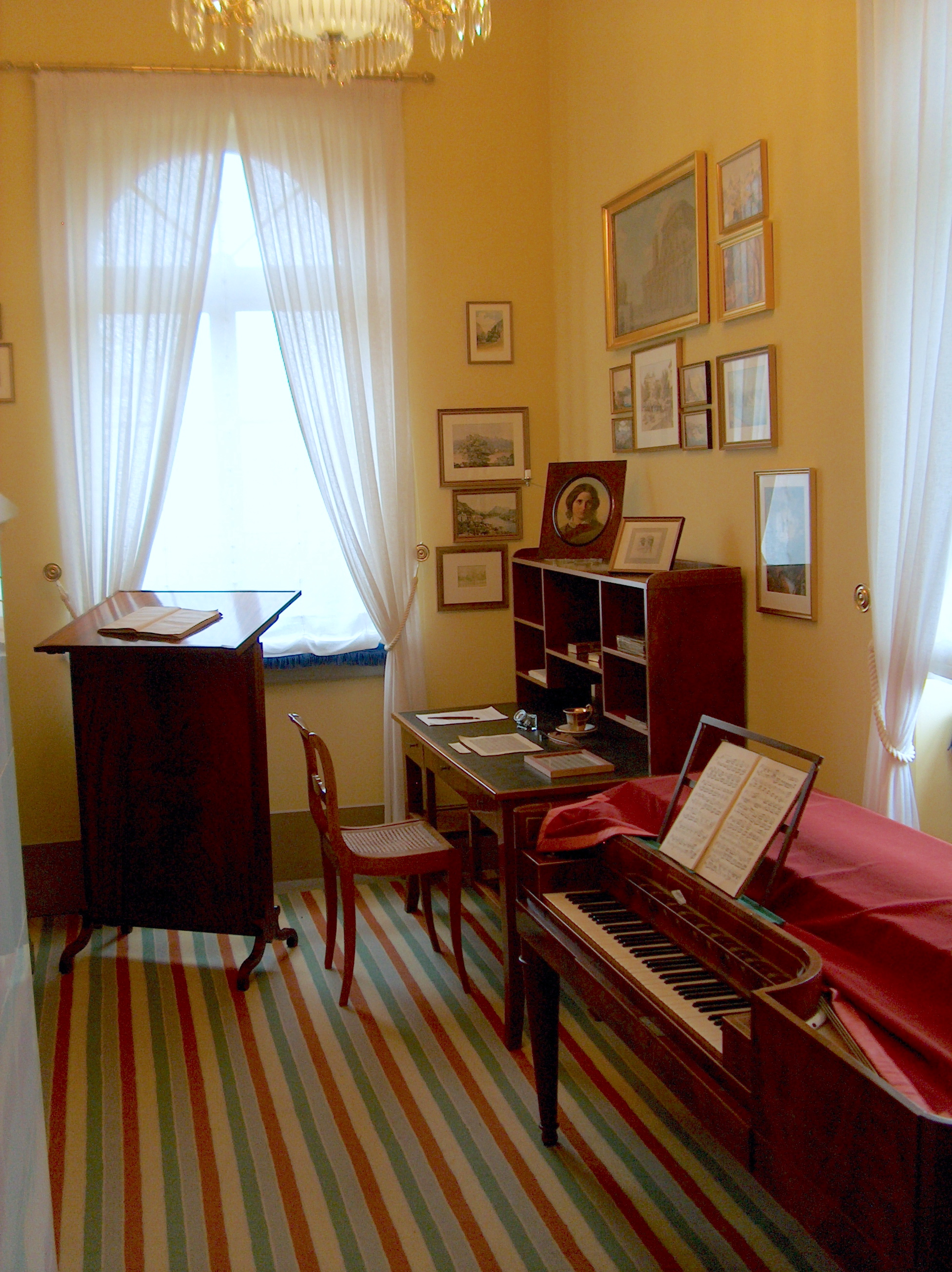
The composer's study in Mendelssohn House, a museum in Leipzig

In Leipzig, Mendelssohn concentrated on developing the town's musical life by working with the orchestra, the opera house, the Thomanerchor (of which Bach had been a director), and the city's other choral and musical institutions. Mendelssohn's concerts included, in addition to many of his own works, three series of "historical concerts" featuring music of the eighteenth century, and a number of works by his contemporaries. He was deluged by offers of music from rising and would-be composers; among these was Richard Wagner, who submitted his early Symphony, the score of which, to Wagner's disgust, Mendelssohn lost or mislaid. Mendelssohn also revived interest in the music of Franz Schubert. Robert Schumann discovered the manuscript of Schubert's Ninth Symphony and sent it to Mendelssohn, who promptly premiered it in Leipzig on 21 March 1839, more than a decade after Schubert's death.

A landmark event during Mendelssohn's Leipzig years was the premiere of his oratorio Paulus, (the English version of this is known as St. Paul), given at the Lower Rhenish Festival in Düsseldorf in 1836, shortly after the death of the composer's father, which affected him greatly; Felix wrote that he would "never cease to endeavour to gain his approval ... although I can no longer enjoy it". St. Paul seemed to many of Mendelssohn's contemporaries to be his finest work, and sealed his European reputation.

When Friedrich Wilhelm IV came to the Prussian throne in 1840 with ambitions to develop Berlin as a cultural centre (including the establishment of a music school and reform of music for the church), the obvious choice to head these reforms was Mendelssohn. He was reluctant to undertake the task, especially in the light of his existing strong position in Leipzig. Mendelssohn nonetheless spent some time in Berlin, writing some church music such as Die Deutsche Liturgie, and, at the King's request, music for productions of Sophocles's Antigone (1841 – an overture and seven pieces) and Oedipus at Colonus (1845), A Midsummer Night's Dream (1843) and Racine's Athalie (1845). (Note: In 1842 Mendelssohn was awarded by the King the honour Pour le Mérite for Sciences and Arts.) But the funds for the school never materialised, and many of the court's promises to Mendelssohn regarding finances, title, and concert programming were broken. He was therefore not displeased to have the excuse to return to Leipzig.

In 1840 Mendelssohn initiated a project to erect a memorial monument to J. S. Bach in Leipzig. The Old Bach Monument was unveiled on 23 April 1843, financed primarily from the net proceeds of three concerts, with Mendelssohn contributing the remaining amount from his private fortune.

In 1843 Mendelssohn founded a major music school – the Leipzig Conservatory, (Note: When founded in 1843 this institution was officially known as the "Leipziger Konservatorium der Musik". English-language Mendelssohn authorities, for example R. Larry Todd and Erich Werner, refer to it as the Leipzig Conservatory.) now the Hochschule für Musik und Theater "Felix Mendelssohn Bartholdy". (Note: In its own English self-designation, the "Felix Mendelssohn Bartholdy University of Music and Theatre" (HMT website, accessed 6 November 2017.)) where he persuaded Ignaz Moscheles and Robert Schumann to join him. Other prominent musicians, including the string players Ferdinand David and Joseph Joachim and the music theorist Moritz Hauptmann, also became staff members. After Mendelssohn's death in 1847, his musically conservative tradition was carried on when Moscheles succeeded him as head of the Conservatory.

==== Mendelssohn in Britain ====
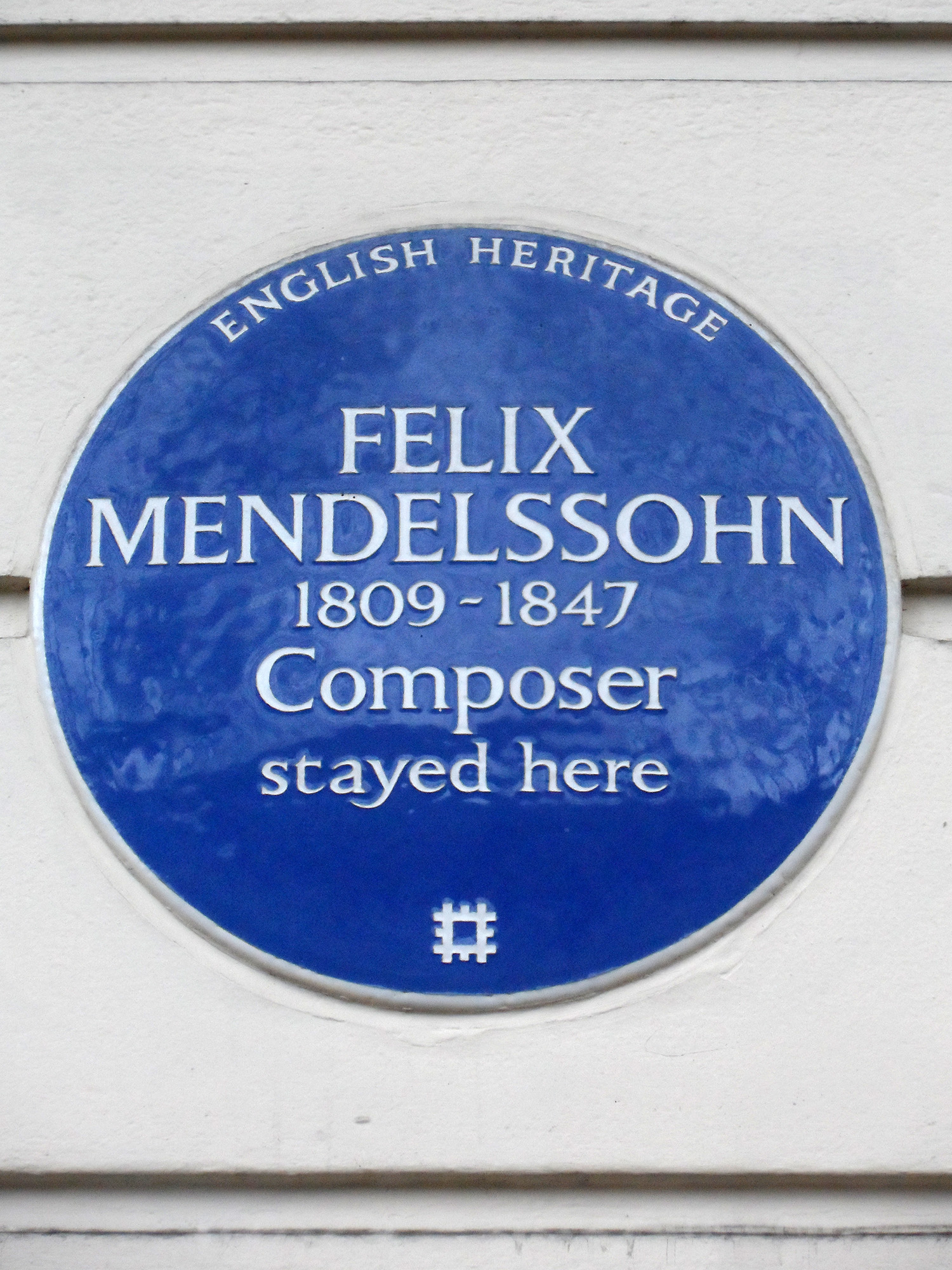
English Heritage blue plaque commemorating Mendelssohn's residence in England at 4 Hobart Place in Belgravia, London

Mendelssohn first visited Britain in 1829, where Moscheles, who had already settled in London, introduced him to influential musical circles. In the summer he visited Edinburgh, where he met among others the composer John Thomson, whom he later recommended for the post of professor of music at Edinburgh University. He made ten visits to Britain, lasting altogether about 20 months; he won a strong following, which enabled him to make a good impression on British musical life. He composed and performed, and also edited for British publishers the first critical editions of oratorios of Handel and of the organ music of J. S. Bach. Scotland inspired two of his most famous works: the overture The Hebrides (also known as Fingal's Cave); and the Scottish Symphony (Symphony No. 3). A blue plaque commemorating Mendelssohn's residence in London was placed at 4 Hobart Place in Belgravia, London, in 2013.

His protégé, the British composer and pianist William Sterndale Bennett, worked closely with Mendelssohn during this period, both in London and Leipzig. He first heard Bennett perform in London in 1833, aged 17. (Note: On this occasion, when Bennett was 17 and Mendelssohn 24, Mendelssohn immediately invited Bennett to visit him in Germany. " 'If I come', said Bennett, 'may I come to be your pupil?' 'No, no', was the reply 'you must come to be my friend.' ") Bennett appeared with Mendelssohn in concerts in Leipzig throughout the 1836/1837 season.

On Mendelssohn's eighth British visit in the summer of 1844, he conducted five of the Philharmonic concerts in London, and wrote: "[N]ever before was anything like this season – we never went to bed before half-past one, every hour of every day was filled with engagements three weeks beforehand, and I got through more music in two months than in all the rest of the year." On subsequent visits Mendelssohn met Queen Victoria and her husband Prince Albert, himself a composer, who both greatly admired his music.

Mendelssohn's oratorio Elijah was commissioned by the Birmingham Triennial Music Festival and premiered on 26 August 1846, at the Town Hall, Birmingham. It was composed to a German text translated into English by William Bartholomew, who authored and translated many of Mendelssohn's works during his time in England.

On his last visit to Britain in 1847, Mendelssohn was the soloist in Beethoven's Piano Concerto No. 4 and conducted his own Scottish Symphony with the Philharmonic Orchestra before the Queen and Prince Albert.

==== Death ====
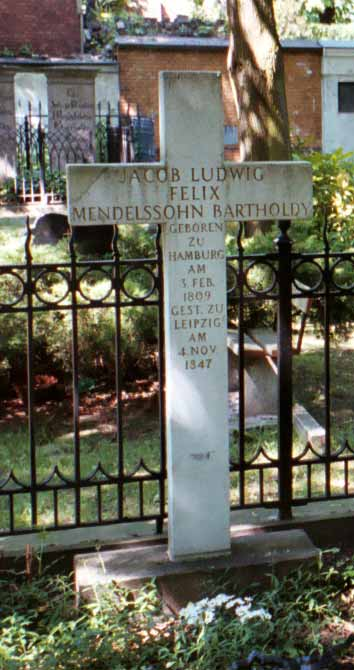
Mendelssohn's gravestone at the Dreifaltigkeitsfriedhof

Mendelssohn suffered from poor health in the final years of his life, probably aggravated by nervous problems and overwork. A final tour of England left him exhausted and ill, and the death of his sister, Fanny, on 14 May 1847, caused him further distress. Less than six months later, on 4 November, aged 38, Mendelssohn died in Leipzig after a series of strokes. His grandfather Moses, Fanny, and both his parents had all died from similar apoplexies. (Note: One assessment of the type of stroke from which the Mendelssohn family suffered is subarachnoidal haemorrhage.) Although he had been generally meticulous in the management of his affairs, he died intestate.

Mendelssohn's funeral was held at the Paulinerkirche, Leipzig, and he was buried at the Dreifaltigkeitsfriedhof I in Berlin-Kreuzberg. The pallbearers included Moscheles, Schumann and Niels Gade. Mendelssohn had once described death, in a letter to a stranger, as a place "where it is to be hoped there is still music, but no more sorrow or partings."

== Personal life ==
=== Personality ===
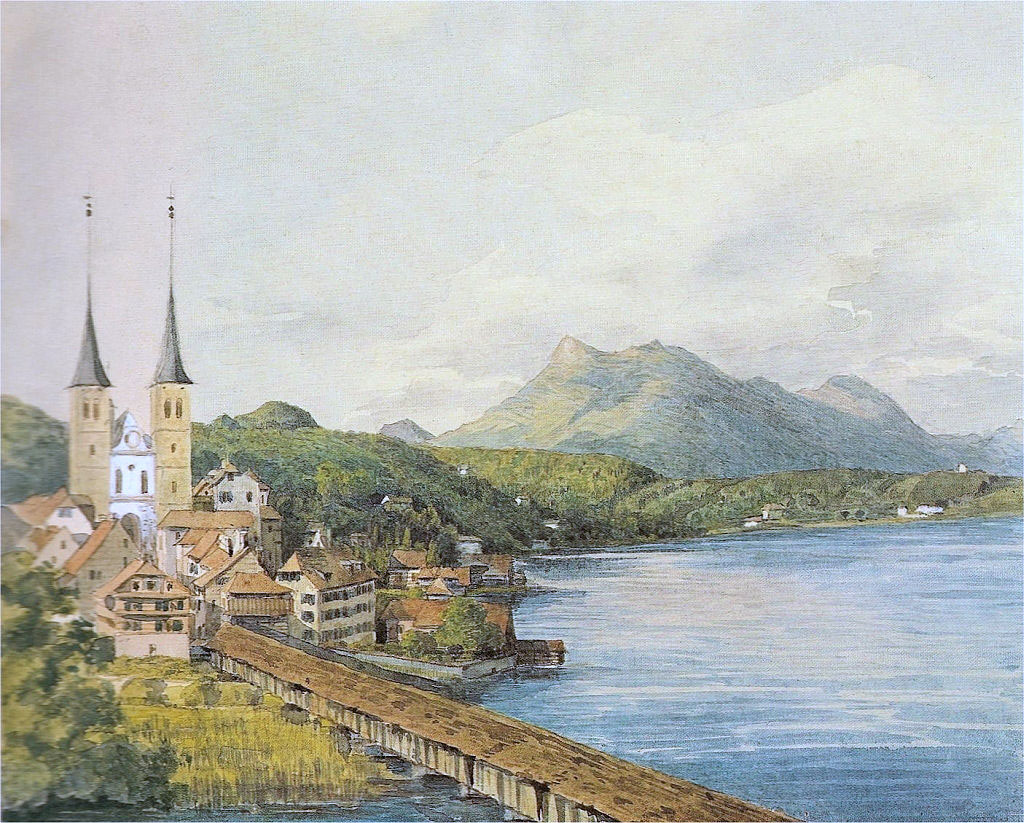
View of Lucerne – watercolour by Mendelssohn, 1847

While Mendelssohn was often presented as equable, happy, and placid in temperament, particularly in the detailed family memoirs published by his nephew Sebastian Hensel after the composer's death, this was misleading. The music historian R. Larry Todd notes "the remarkable process of idealization" of Mendelssohn's character "that crystallized in the memoirs of the composer's circle", including Hensel's. The nickname "discontented Polish count" was given to Mendelssohn on account of his aloofness, and he referred to the epithet in his letters. He was frequently given to fits of temper which occasionally led to collapse. Devrient mentions that on one occasion in the 1830s, when his wishes had been crossed, "his excitement was increased so fearfully ... that when the family was assembled ... he began to talk incoherently in English. The stern voice of his father at last checked the wild torrent of words; they took him to bed, and a profound sleep of twelve hours restored him to his normal state". Such fits may be related to his early death.

Mendelssohn was an enthusiastic visual artist who worked in pencil and watercolour, a skill which he enjoyed throughout his life. His correspondence indicates that he could write with considerable wit in German and English – his letters were sometimes accompanied by humorous sketches and cartoons.

=== Religion ===
On 21 March 1816, at the age of seven years, Mendelssohn was baptised with his brother and sisters in a private domestic ceremony by Johann Jakob Stegemann, Minister of the Evangelical congregation of Berlin's Jerusalem Church and New Church. Although Mendelssohn was a conforming Christian as a member of the Reformed Church, (Note: His friend the cleric Julius Schubring noted that although Mendelssohn "entertained a feeling of affectionate reverence" for his spiritual adviser, the pastor Friedrich Philipp Wilmsen (1770–1831) at the Reformed Parochial Church, "it is true that he did not go very often to hear him perform Divine Service".) he was both conscious and proud of his Jewish ancestry and notably of his connection with his grandfather, Moses Mendelssohn. He was the prime mover in proposing to the publisher Heinrich Brockhaus a complete edition of Moses' works, which continued with the support of his uncle, Joseph Mendelssohn. Felix was notably reluctant, either in his letters or conversation, to comment on his innermost beliefs; his friend Devrient wrote that "[his] deep convictions were never uttered in intercourse with the world; only in rare and intimate moments did they ever appear, and then only in the slightest and most humorous allusions". Thus for example in a letter to his sister Rebecka, Mendelssohn rebukes her complaint about an unpleasant relative: "What do you mean by saying you are not hostile to Jews? I hope this was a joke [...] It is really sweet of you that you do not despise your family, isn't it?" Some modern scholars have devoted considerable energy to demonstrate either that Mendelssohn was deeply sympathetic to his ancestors' Jewish beliefs, or that he was hostile to this and sincere in his Christian beliefs. (Note: The debate became heated when it was discovered that the Mendelssohn scholar Eric Werner had been over-enthusiastic in his interpretation of some documentation in an attempt to establish Felix's Jewish sympathies. See The Musical Quarterly, vols. 82–83 (1998), with articles by J. Sposato, Leon Botstein and others, for expressions of both points of view; and see Conway (2012) for a tertium quid.)

=== Mendelssohn and his contemporaries ===
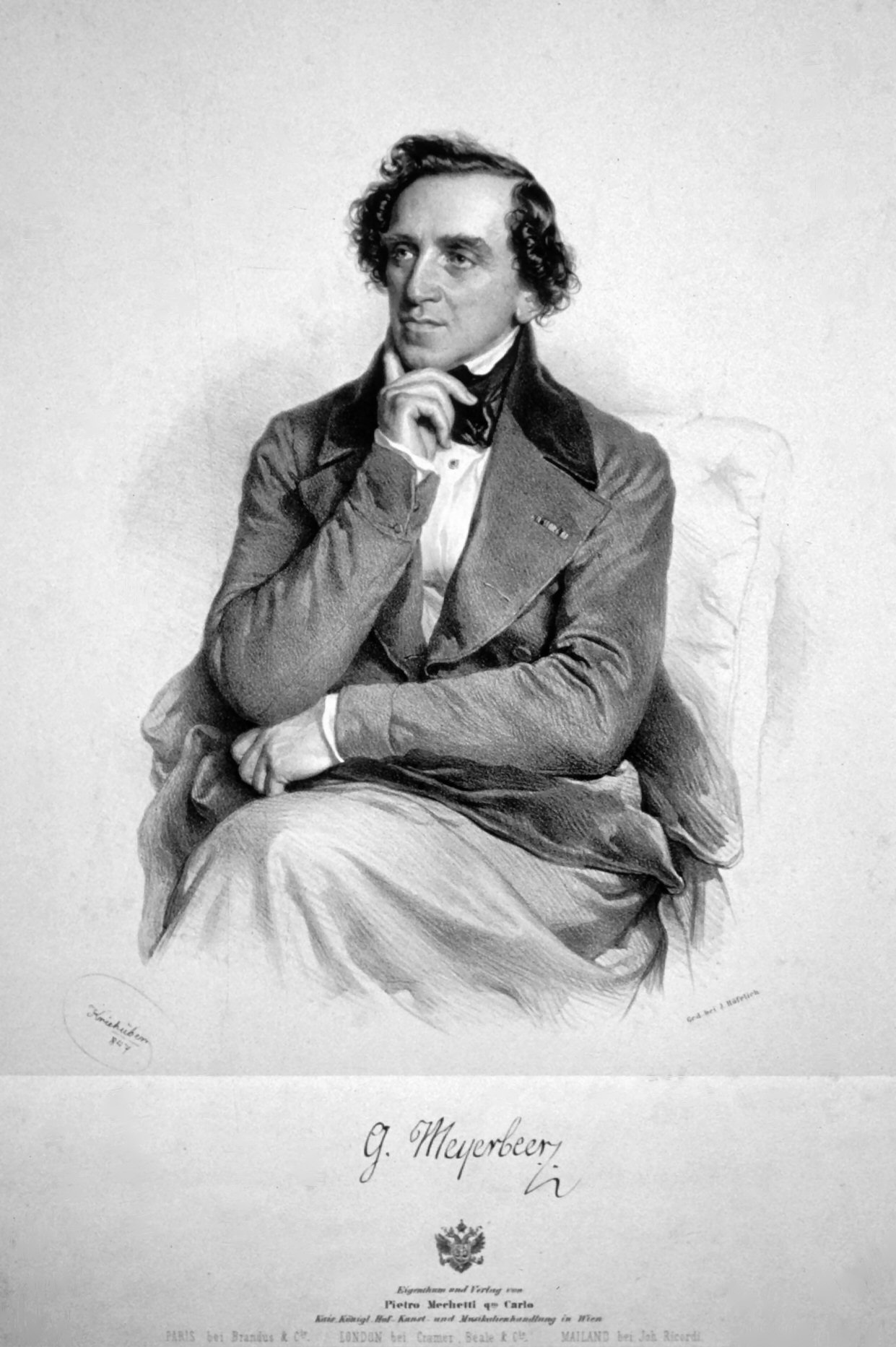
Giacomo Meyerbeer by Josef Kriehuber, 1847

Throughout his life Mendelssohn was wary of the more radical musical developments undertaken by some of his contemporaries. He was generally on friendly, if sometimes somewhat cool, terms with Hector Berlioz, Franz Liszt, and Giacomo Meyerbeer, but in his letters expresses his frank disapproval of their works, for example writing of Liszt that his compositions were "inferior to his playing, and […] only calculated for virtuosos"; of Berlioz's overture Les francs-juges "[T]he orchestration is such a frightful muddle [...] that one ought to wash one's hands after handling one of his scores"; and of Meyerbeer's opera Robert le diable "I consider it ignoble", calling its villain Bertram "a poor devil". When his friend the composer Ferdinand Hiller suggested in conversation to Mendelssohn that he looked rather like Meyerbeer – they were actually distant cousins, both descendants of Rabbi Moses Isserles – Mendelssohn was so upset that he immediately went to get a haircut to differentiate himself.

In particular, Mendelssohn seems to have regarded Paris and its music with the greatest of suspicion and an almost puritanical distaste. Attempts made during his visit there to interest him in Saint-Simonianism ended in embarrassing scenes. It is significant that the only musician with whom Mendelssohn remained a close friend, Ignaz Moscheles, was of an older generation and equally conservative in outlook. Moscheles preserved this conservative attitude at the Leipzig Conservatory until his own death in 1870.

=== Marriage and children ===
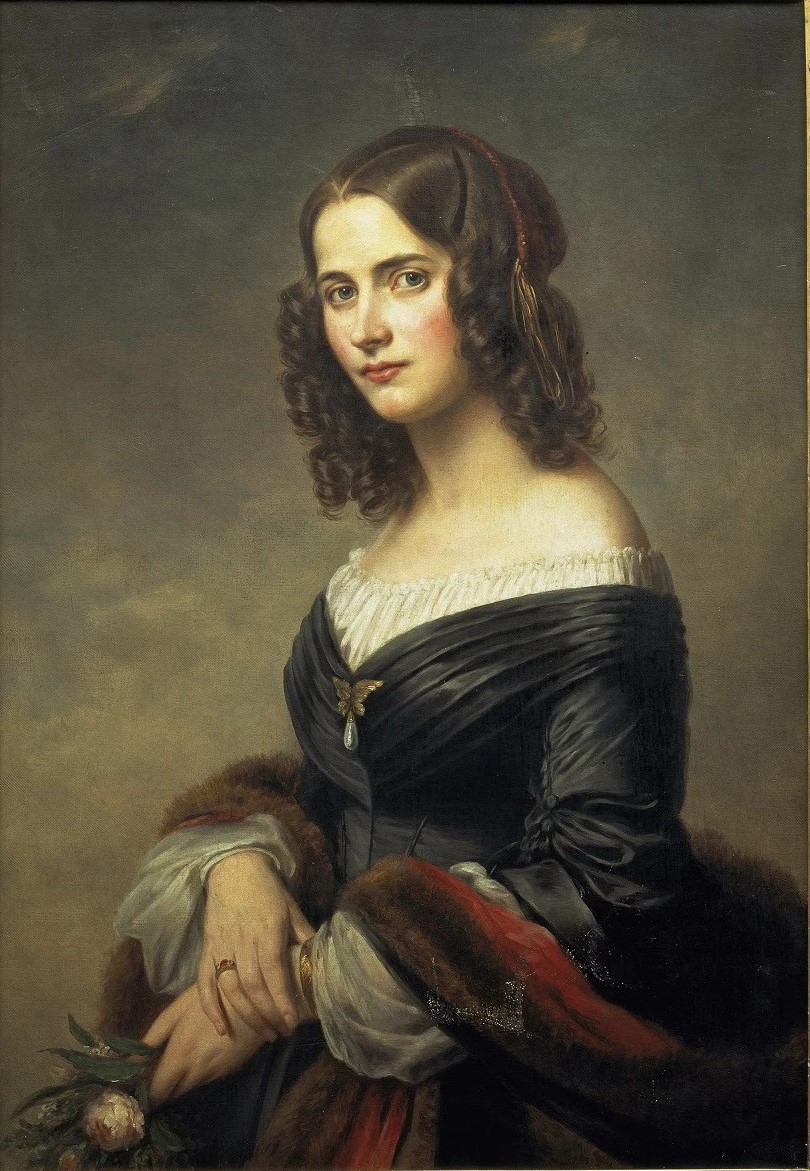
Mendelssohn's wife Cécile (1846) by Eduard Magnus

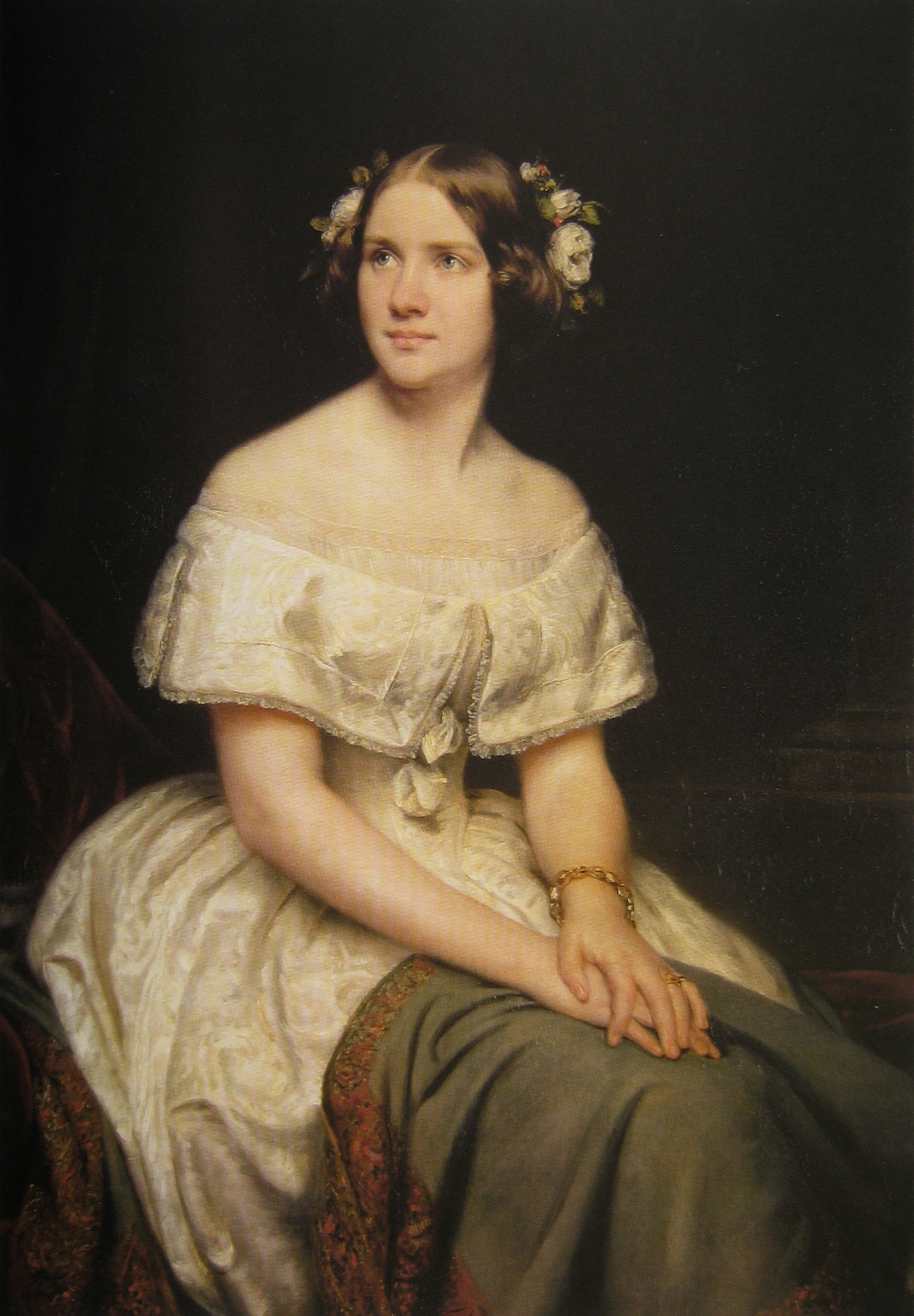
Jenny Lind by Eduard Magnus, 1862

Mendelssohn married Cécile Charlotte Sophie Jeanrenaud (10 October 1817 – 25 September 1853), the daughter of a French Reformed Church clergyman, on 28 March 1837. The couple had five children: Carl, Marie, Paul, Lili and Felix August. The second youngest child, Felix August, contracted measles in 1844 and was left with impaired health; he died in 1851. The eldest, Carl Mendelssohn Bartholdy (7 February 1838 – 23 February 1897), became a historian and professor of history at Heidelberg and Freiburg universities; he died in a psychiatric institution in Freiburg aged 59. Paul Mendelssohn Bartholdy (1841–1880) was a noted chemist and pioneered the manufacture of aniline dye. Marie married Victor Benecke and lived in London. Lili married Adolf Wach, later professor of law at Leipzig University.

The family papers inherited by Marie's and Lili's children form the basis of the extensive collection of Mendelssohn manuscripts, including the so-called "Green Books" of his correspondence, now in the Bodleian Library at Oxford University. Cécile Mendelssohn Bartholdy died less than six years after her husband, on 25 September 1853.

=== Jenny Lind ===
Mendelssohn became close to the Swedish soprano Jenny Lind, whom he met in October 1844. Papers confirming their relationship had not been made public. (Note: Mercer-Taylor wrote that although there was no currently available hard evidence of a physical affair between the two, "absence of evidence is not evidence of absence". Clive Brown wrote that "it has been rumoured that [...] papers tend to substantiate the notion of an affair between Mendelssohn and Lind, though with what degree of reliability must remain highly questionable".) In 2013, George Biddlecombe confirmed in the Journal of the Royal Musical Association that "The Committee of the Mendelssohn Scholarship Foundation possesses material indicating that Mendelssohn wrote passionate love letters to Jenny Lind entreating her to join him in an adulterous relationship and threatening suicide as a means of exerting pressure upon her, and that these letters were destroyed on being discovered after her death."

Mendelssohn met and worked with Lind many times, and started an opera, Lorelei, for her, based on the legend of the Lorelei Rhine maidens; the opera was unfinished at his death. He is said to have tailored the aria "Hear Ye Israel", in his oratorio Elijah, to Lind's voice, although she did not sing the part until after his death, at a concert in December 1848. In 1847, Mendelssohn attended a London performance of Meyerbeer's Robert le diable – an opera that musically he despised – in order to hear Lind's British debut, in the role of Alice. The music critic Henry Chorley, who was with him, wrote: "I see as I write the smile with which Mendelssohn, whose enjoyment of Mdlle. Lind's talent was unlimited, turned round and looked at me, as if a load of anxiety had been taken off his mind. His attachment to Mdlle. Lind's genius as a singer was unbounded, as was his desire for her success."

Upon Mendelssohn's death, Lind wrote: "[He was] the only person who brought fulfillment to my spirit, and almost as soon as I found him I lost him again." In 1849, she established the Mendelssohn Scholarship Foundation, which makes an award to a young resident British composer every two years in Mendelssohn's memory. The first winner of the scholarship, in 1856, was Arthur Sullivan, then aged 14. In 1869, Lind erected a plaque in Mendelssohn's memory at his birthplace in Hamburg.

== Music ==
=== Composer ===
==== Style ====
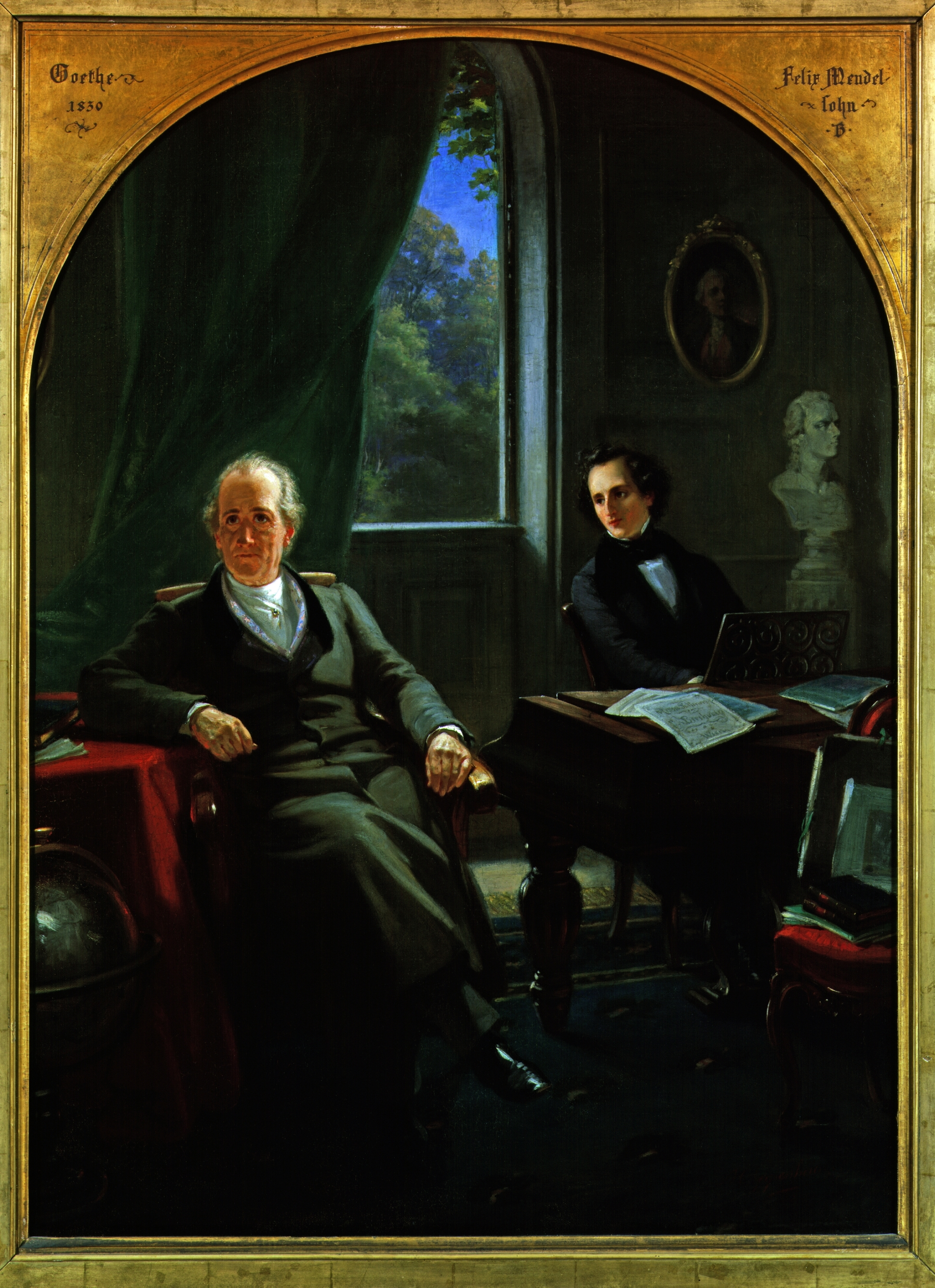
Mendelssohn plays to Goethe, 1830, by Moritz Oppenheim, 1864

Something of Mendelssohn's intense attachment to his personal vision of music is conveyed in his comments to a correspondent who suggested converting some of the Songs Without Words into lieder by adding texts: "What [the] music I love expresses to me, are not thoughts that are too indefinite for me to put into words, but on the contrary, too definite." (Note: "Das, was mir eine Musik ausspricht, die ich liebe, sind mir nicht zu unbestimmte Gedanken, um sie in Worte zu fassen, sondern zu bestimmte." From a letter to Marc-André Souchay of 15 October 1842; Mendelssohn's own emphases.p. 298)

Schumann wrote of Mendelssohn that he was "the Mozart of the nineteenth century, the most brilliant musician, the one who most clearly sees through the contradictions of the age and for the first time reconciles them." This appreciation brings to the fore two features that characterized Mendelssohn's compositions and his compositional process. First, his inspiration for musical style was rooted in his technical mastery and his interpretation of the style of previous masters, although he certainly recognized and developed the strains of early Romanticism in the music of Beethoven and Weber. The historian James Garratt writes that from his early career, "the view emerged that Mendelssohn's engagement with early music was a defining aspect of his creativity." This approach was recognized by Mendelssohn himself, who wrote that, in his meetings with Goethe, he gave the poet "historical exhibitions" at the keyboard; "every morning, for about an hour, I have to play a variety of works by great composers in chronological order, and must explain to him how they contributed to the advance of music." Secondly, it highlights that Mendelssohn was more concerned with reinvigorating the musical legacy which he inherited, rather than replacing it with new forms and styles, or with the use of more exotic orchestration. In these ways he differed significantly from many of his contemporaries in the early Romantic period, such as Wagner, Berlioz and Franz Liszt. Whilst Mendelssohn admired Liszt's virtuosity at the keyboard, he found his music jejune. Although very close friends, Berlioz said of Mendelssohn that he had "perhaps studied the music of the dead too closely."

The musicologist Greg Vitercik considers that, while "Mendelssohn's music only rarely aspires to provoke", the stylistic innovations evident from his earliest works solve some of the contradictions between classical forms and the sentiments of Romanticism. The expressiveness of Romantic music presented a problem in adherence to sonata form; the final (recapitulation) section of a movement could seem, in the context of Romantic style, a bland element without passion or soul. Furthermore, it could be seen as a pedantic delay before reaching the emotional climax of a movement, which in the classical tradition had tended to be at the transition from the development section of the movement to the recapitulation; whereas Berlioz and other "modernists" sought to have the emotional climax at the end of a movement, if necessary by adding an extended coda to follow the recapitulation proper. Mendelssohn's solution to this problem was less sensational than Berlioz's approach, but was rooted in changing the structural balance of the formal components of the movement. Thus, typically in a Mendelssohnian movement, the development-recapitulation transition might not be strongly marked, and the recapitulation section would be harmonically or melodically varied so as not to be a direct copy of the opening, exposition, section; this allowed a logical movement towards a final climax. Vitercik summarizes the effect as "to assimilate the dynamic trajectory of 'external form' to the 'logical' unfolding of the story of the theme".

Richard Taruskin wrote that, although Mendelssohn produced works of extraordinary mastery at a very early age,

he never outgrew his precocious youthful style. [...] He remained stylistically conservative [...] feeling no need to attract attention with a display of "revolutionary" novelty. Throughout his short career he remained comfortably faithful to the musical status quo – that is, the "classical" forms, as they were already thought of by his time. His version of romanticism, already evident in his earliest works, consisted in musical "pictorialism" of a fairly conventional, objective nature (though exquisitely wrought).

==== Early works ====
The young Mendelssohn was greatly influenced in his childhood by the music of both J. S. Bach and C. P. E. Bach, and of Beethoven, Joseph Haydn and Mozart; traces of these composers can be seen in the 13 early string symphonies. These were written from 1821 to 1823, when he was between the ages of 12 and 14, principally for performance in the Mendelssohn household, and not published or publicly performed until long after his death.

His first published works were his three piano quartets (1822–1825; Op. 1 in C minor, Op. 2 in F minor and Op. 3 in B minor); but his capacities are especially revealed in a group of works of his early maturity: the String Octet (1825), the Overture A Midsummer Night's Dream (1826), which in its finished form also owes much to the influence of Adolf Bernhard Marx, at the time a close friend of Mendelssohn, and the two early string quartets: Op. 12 (1829) and Op. 13 (1827), which both show a remarkable grasp of the techniques and ideas of Beethoven's last quartets that Mendelssohn had been closely studying. These four works show an intuitive command of form, harmony, counterpoint, colour, and compositional technique, which, in the opinion of R. Larry Todd, justifies claims frequently made that Mendelssohn's precocity exceeded even that of Mozart in its intellectual grasp.

A 2009 survey by the BBC of 16 music critics opined that Mendelssohn was the greatest composing prodigy in the history of Western classical music.

==== Symphonies ====
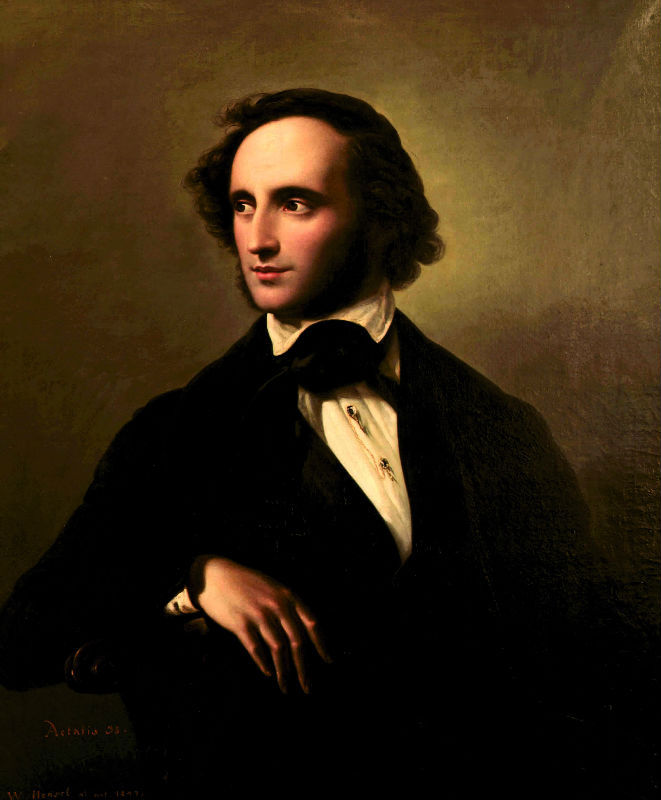
Portrait of Mendelssohn by Wilhelm Hensel, 1847

Mendelssohn's mature symphonies are numbered approximately in the order of publication, rather than the order in which they were composed. The order of composition is: 1, 5 "Reformation", 4 "Italian", 2 "Lobgesang", 3 "Scottish". The placement of No. 3 in this sequence is problematic because he worked on it for over a decade, starting the sketches soon after he began work on No. 5 but completing it after both Nos. 5 and 4.

The Symphony No. 1 in C minor for full orchestra was written in 1824, when Mendelssohn was aged 15. This work is experimental, showing the influences of Beethoven and Carl Maria von Weber. Mendelssohn conducted the symphony on his first visit to London in 1829, with the orchestra of the Philharmonic Society. For the third movement, he substituted an orchestration of the Scherzo from his Octet. In this form the piece was a success, and laid the foundations of his British reputation.

During 1829 and 1830, Mendelssohn wrote his Symphony No. 5, known as the Reformation. It celebrated the 300th anniversary of the Reformation. Mendelssohn remained dissatisfied with the work and did not allow publication of the score.

Mendelssohn's travels in Italy inspired him to compose the Symphony No. 4 in A major, known as the Italian Symphony. He conducted the premiere in 1833, but did not allow the score to be published during his lifetime, as he continually sought to rewrite it.

The Scottish Symphony (Symphony No. 3 in A minor) was written and revised intermittently between 1829 (when Mendelssohn noted down the opening theme during a visit to Holyrood Palace) and 1842, when it was given its premiere in Leipzig, the last of his symphonies to be premiered in public. This piece evokes Scotland's atmosphere in the ethos of Romanticism, but does not employ any identified Scottish folk melodies.

He wrote the symphony-cantata Lobgesang (Hymn of Praise) in B♭ major, posthumously named Symphony No. 2, to mark the celebrations in Leipzig of the supposed 400th anniversary of the printing press by Johannes Gutenberg; the first performance took place on 25 June 1840.

==== Other orchestral music ====
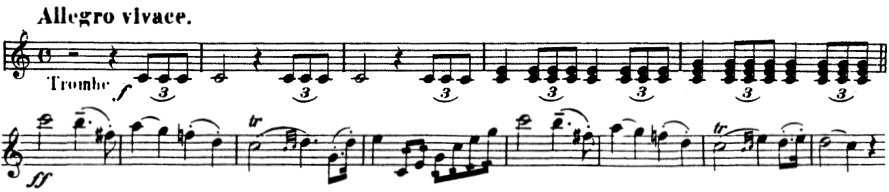
Trumpet part (top) and the main theme in the violin part (bottom), of the "Wedding March" from Mendelssohn's Op. 61

Mendelssohn wrote the concert overture The Hebrides (Fingal's Cave) in 1830, inspired by visits to Scotland around the end of the 1820s. He visited Fingal's Cave, on the Hebridean isle of Staffa, as part of his Grand Tour of Europe, and was so impressed that he scribbled the opening theme of the overture on the spot, including it in a letter he wrote home the same evening. He wrote other concert overtures, notably Calm Sea and Prosperous Voyage (Meeresstille und glückliche Fahrt, 1828), inspired by a pair of poems by Goethe and The Fair Melusine (Die schöne Melusine) (1830). A contemporary writer considered these works as "perhaps the most beautiful overtures that, so far, we Germans possess".

Mendelssohn also wrote in 1839 an overture to Ruy Blas, commissioned for a charity performance of Victor Hugo's drama (which the composer hated). His incidental music to A Midsummer Night's Dream (Op. 61), including the well-known "Wedding March", was written in 1843, seventeen years after the Overture.

==== Concertos ====
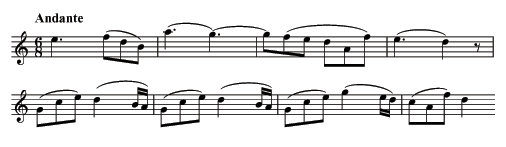
Violin Concerto Op. 64, main theme of second movement

The Violin Concerto in E minor, Op. 64 (1844), was written for Ferdinand David. David, who had worked closely with Mendelssohn during the piece's preparation, gave the premiere of the concerto on his Guarneri violin. Joseph Joachim called it one of the four great violin concertos along with those of Beethoven, Brahms, and Bruch.

Mendelssohn also wrote a lesser-known, early concerto for violin and strings in D minor (1822); four piano concertos ("no. 0" in A minor, 1822; 1 in G minor, 1831; 2 in D minor, 1837; and 3 in E minor, a posthumously published fragment from 1844); two concertos for two pianos and orchestra (E major, which he wrote at 14 [1823], and A♭ major, at 15 [1824]); and another double concerto, for violin and piano (1823). In addition, there are several single-movement works for soloist and orchestra. Those for piano are the Rondo Brillante of 1834, the Capriccio Brillante of 1832, and the Serenade and Allegro Giocoso of 1838. He also wrote two concertinos (Konzertstücke), Op. 113 and 114, originally for clarinet, basset horn and piano; Op. 113 was orchestrated by the composer.

==== Chamber music ====
Mendelssohn's mature output contains numerous chamber works, many of which display an emotional intensity lacking in some of his larger works. In particular, his String Quartet No. 6, the last of his string quartets and his last major work – written following the death of his sister Fanny – is, in the opinion of the historian Peter Mercer-Taylor, exceptionally powerful and eloquent. Other mature works include two string quintets; sonatas for the clarinet, cello, viola and violin; and two piano trios. For the Piano Trio No. 1 in D minor, Mendelssohn uncharacteristically took the advice of his fellow composer, Ferdinand Hiller, and rewrote the piano part in a more Romantic, "Schumannesque" style, considerably heightening its effect.

==== Piano music ====
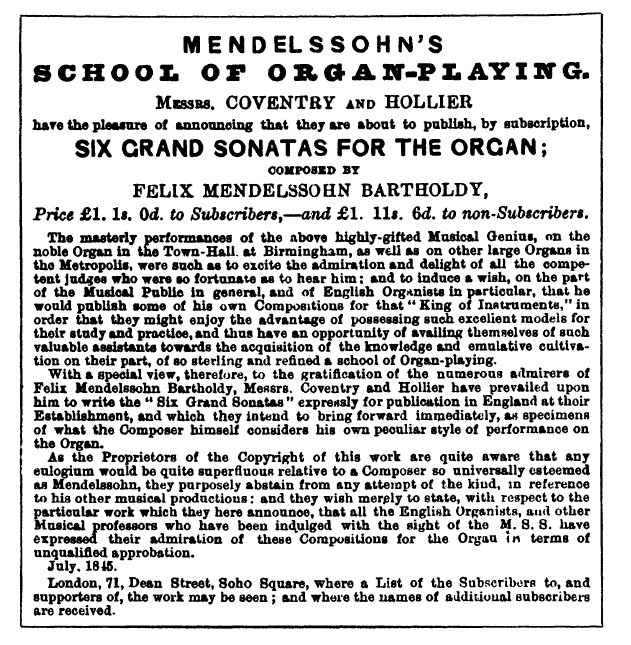
Advertisement for the Organ Sonatas in the Musical World, 24 July 1845

The musicologist Glenn Stanley observes that "[u]nlike Brahms, unlike his contemporaries Schumann, Chopin and Liszt, and unlike [his] revered past masters....Mendelssohn did not regard the piano as a preferred medium for his most significant artistic statements". Mendelssohn's Songs Without Words (Lieder ohne Worte), eight cycles each containing six lyric pieces (two published posthumously), remain his most famous solo piano compositions. They became standard parlour recital items even during the composer's lifetime, and their overwhelming popularity, according to Todd, has itself caused many critics to underrate their musical value. As an example, Charles Rosen equivocally commented, despite noting "how much beautiful music they contain", that "[i]t is not true that they are insipid, but they might as well be." During the 19th century, composers who were inspired to produce similar pieces of their own included Charles-Valentin Alkan (his five sets of Chants, each ending with a barcarolle) and Anton Rubinstein.

Other notable piano works by Mendelssohn include his Variations sérieuses, Op. 54 (1841), the Rondo Capriccioso (1830), the set of six Preludes and Fugues, Op. 35 (written between 1832 and 1837), and the Seven Characteristic Pieces, Op. 7 (1827).

==== Organ music ====
Mendelssohn played and composed for organ from the age of 11 until his death. His primary organ works are the Three Preludes and Fugues, Op. 37 (1837), and the Six Sonatas, Op. 65 (1845), of which Eric Werner wrote "next to Bach's works, Mendelssohn's Organ Sonatas belong to the required repertory of all organists".

==== Opera ====
Mendelssohn wrote some Singspiele for family performance in his youth. His opera Die beiden Neffen (The Two Nephews) was rehearsed for him on his 15th birthday. 1829 saw Die Heimkehr aus der Fremde (Son and Stranger or Return of the Roamer), a comedy of mistaken identity written in honour of his parents' silver anniversary and unpublished during his lifetime. In 1825 he wrote a more sophisticated work, Die Hochzeit des Camacho (Camacho's Wedding), based on an episode in Don Quixote, for public consumption. It was produced in Berlin in 1827, but was coolly received. Mendelssohn left the theatre before the conclusion of the first performance, and subsequent performances were cancelled.

Although he never abandoned the idea of composing a full opera, and considered many subjects – including that of the Nibelung saga later adapted by Wagner, about which he corresponded with his sister Fanny – he never wrote more than a few pages of sketches for any project. In Mendelssohn's last years, the opera manager Benjamin Lumley tried to contract him to write an opera from Shakespeare's The Tempest on a libretto by Eugène Scribe, and even announced it as forthcoming in 1847, the year of Mendelssohn's death. The libretto was eventually set by Fromental Halévy. At his death, Mendelssohn left some sketches for an opera on the story of the Lorelei.

==== Choral works ====
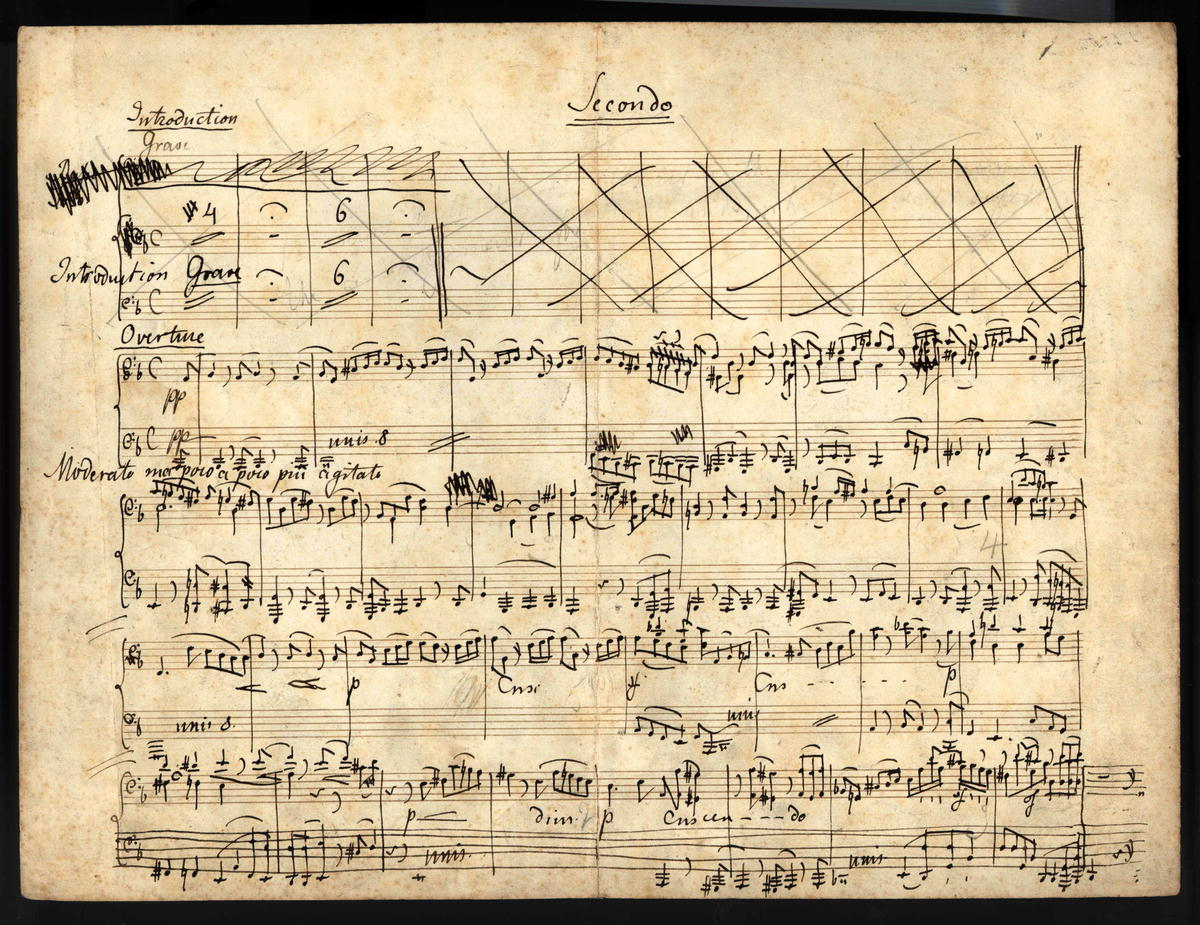
Part of the overture to Elijah arranged by Mendelssohn for piano duet (manuscript in the Library of Congress)

Mendelssohn's two large biblical oratorios, St Paul in 1836 and Elijah in 1846, are greatly influenced by J. S. Bach. The surviving fragments of an unfinished oratorio, Christus, consist of a recitative, a chorus "There Shall a Star Come out of Jacob", and a male voice trio.

Strikingly different is the more overtly Romantic Die erste Walpurgisnacht (The First Walpurgis Night), a setting for chorus and orchestra of a ballad by Goethe describing pagan rituals of the Druids in the Harz mountains in the early days of Christianity. This score has been seen by the scholar Heinz-Klaus Metzger as a "Jewish protest against the domination of Christianity".

Mendelssohn wrote five settings from "The Book of Psalms" for chorus and orchestra. Schumann opined in 1837 that his version of Psalm 42 was the "highest point that he [Mendelssohn] reached as a composer for the church. Indeed the highest point recent church music has reached at all."

Mendelssohn also wrote many smaller-scale sacred works for unaccompanied choir, such as a setting of Psalm 100, Jauchzet dem Herrn, alle Welt, and for choir with organ. Most are written in or translated into English. Among the most famous is Hear My Prayer, whose second half contains "O for the Wings of a Dove", which was often performed as a separate item. The piece is written for full choir, organ, and a treble or soprano soloist. Mendelssohn's biographer Todd comments, "The very popularity of the anthem in England [...] later exposed it to charges of superficiality from those contemptuous of Victorian mores."

A hymn tune Mendelssohn – an adaptation by William Hayman Cummings of a melody from Mendelssohn's cantata Festgesang (Festive Hymn), a secular 1840s composition, which Mendelssohn felt unsuited to sacred music – has become the standard tune for Charles Wesley's popular Christmas hymn "Hark! The Herald Angels Sing".

==== Songs ====
Mendelssohn wrote many songs, both for solo voice and for duet, with piano. It has been asserted that from 1819 (when he was 10) until his death there was "scarcely a single month in which he was not occupied with song composition". Many of these songs are simple, or slightly modified, strophic settings. Some, such as his best-known song "Auf Flügeln des Gesanges" ("On Wings of Song"), became popular. The scholar Susan Youens comments "If [Mendelssohn]'s emotional range in lied was narrower than Schubert's, that is hardly surprising: Schubert composed many more songs than Mendelssohn across a wider spectrum", and whilst Schubert had a declared intent to modernize the song style of his day, "[t]his was not Mendelssohn's mission."

A number of songs written by Mendelssohn's sister Fanny originally appeared under her brother's name; this may have been partly due to the prejudice of the family, and partly to her own retiring nature. In 1842, this resulted in an embarrassing moment when Queen Victoria, receiving Felix at Buckingham Palace, expressed her intention of singing to the composer her favourite of his songs, Italien (to words by Franz Grillparzer), which Felix confessed was by Fanny.

=== Performer ===
During his lifetime, Mendelssohn became renowned as a keyboard performer, both on the piano and organ. One of his obituarists noted: "First and chiefest we esteem his pianoforte-playing, with its amazing elasticity of touch, rapidity, and power; next his scientific and vigorous organ playing [...] his triumphs on these instruments are fresh in public recollection. In his concerts and recitals Mendelssohn performed works by some of his German predecessors, notably Carl Maria von Weber, Beethoven and J.S. Bach, whose organ music he brought back into the repertoire "virtually alone".

Mendelssohn admired the grand pianos of the Viennese maker Conrad Graf; he acquired one in 1832 which he used in the family house and recitals in Berlin, and later another for use in Düsseldorf. In private and public performances, Mendelssohn was celebrated for his improvisations. On one occasion in London, when asked by the soprano Maria Malibran after a recital to extemporise, he improvised a piece which included the melodies of all the songs she had sung. The music publisher Victor Novello, who was present, remarked "He has done some things that seem to me impossible, even after I have heard them done." At another recital in 1837, where Mendelssohn played the piano for a singer, Robert Schumann ignored the soprano and wrote "Mendelssohn accompanied like a God."

=== Conductor ===
Mendelssohn was a noted conductor, both of his own works and of those by other composers. At his London debut in 1829, he was noted for his innovative use of a baton (then a great novelty). But his novelty also extended to taking great care over tempo, dynamics and the orchestral players themselves – both rebuking them when they were recalcitrant and praising them when they satisfied him. It was his success while conducting at the Lower Rhine music festival of 1836 that led to him taking his first paid professional position as director at Düsseldorf. Among those appreciating Mendelssohn's conducting was Hector Berlioz, who in 1843, invited to Leipzig, exchanged batons with Mendelssohn, writing "When the Great Spirit sends us to hunt in the land of souls, may our warriors hang our tomahawks side by side at the door of the council chamber". At Leipzig, Mendelssohn led the Gewandhaus Orchestra to great heights; although concentrating on the great composers of the past (already becoming canonised as the "classics"), he also included new music by Schumann, Berlioz, Gade and many others, as well as his own music. One critic who was not impressed was Richard Wagner; he accused Mendelssohn of using tempos in his performances of Beethoven symphonies that were far too fast.

=== Editor ===
Mendelssohn's interest in baroque music was not limited to the Bach St Matthew Passion which he had revived in 1829. He was concerned in preparing and editing such music, whether for performance or for publication, to be as close as possible to the original intentions of the composers, including wherever possible a close study of early editions and manuscripts. This could lead him into conflict with publishers; for instance, his edition of Handel's oratorio Israel in Egypt for the London Handel Society (1845) evoked an often contentious correspondence, with Mendelssohn refusing, for example, to add dynamics where not given by Handel, or to add parts for trombones. Mendelssohn also edited a number of Bach's works for organ, and apparently discussed with Robert Schumann the possibility of producing a complete Bach edition.

=== Teacher ===
Although Mendelssohn attributed great importance to musical education, and made a substantial commitment to the Conservatoire he founded in Leipzig, he did not greatly enjoy teaching and took only a very few private pupils who he believed had notable qualities. Such students included the composer William Sterndale Bennett, the pianist Camille-Marie Stamaty, the violinist and composer Julius Eichberg, and Walther von Goethe (grandson of the poet). At the Leipzig Conservatoire Mendelssohn taught classes in composition and ensemble playing.

== Reputation and legacy ==
=== The first century ===
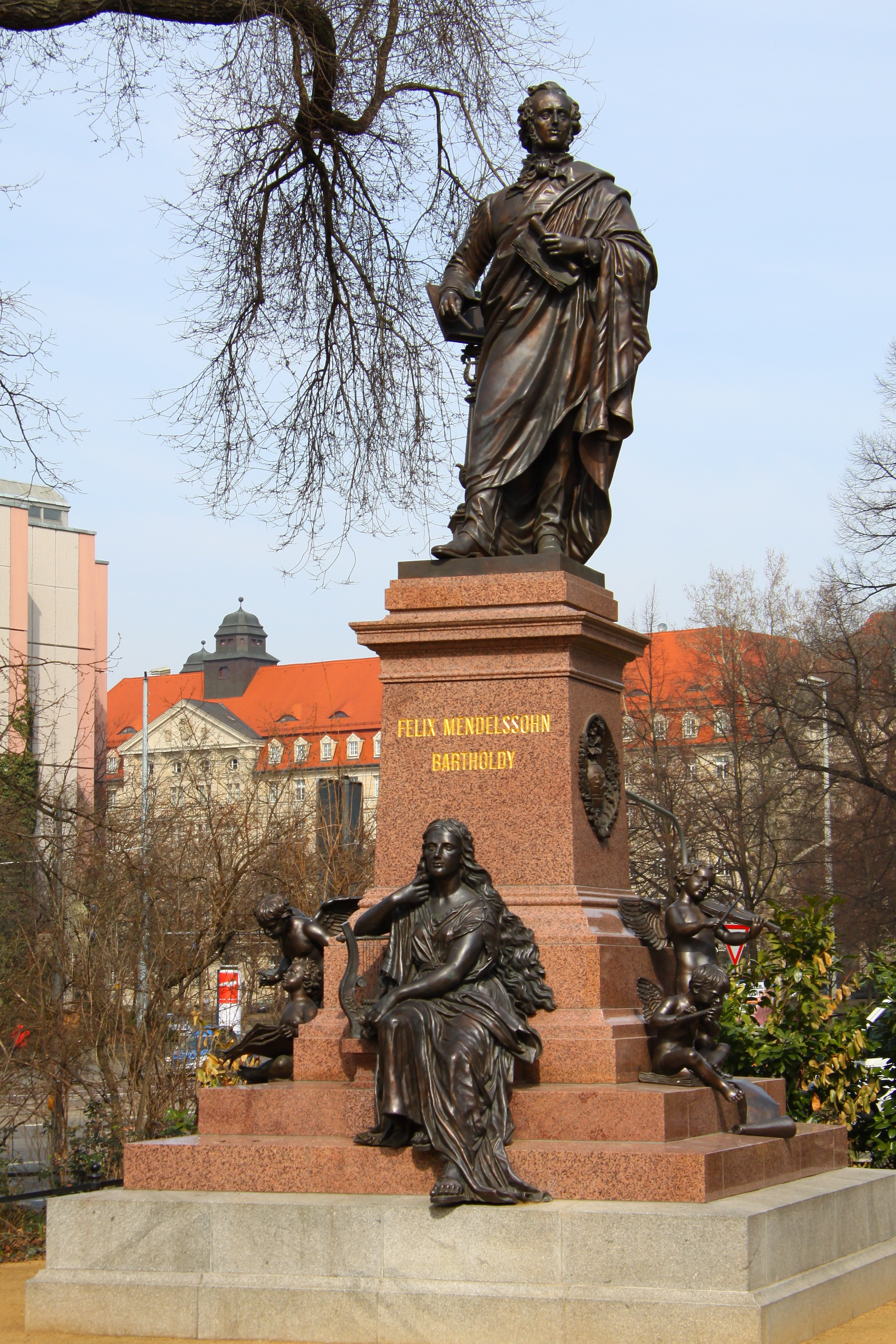
The reconstructed Mendelssohn monument near Leipzig's St. Thomas Church, dedicated in 2008

In the immediate wake of Mendelssohn's death, he was mourned both in Germany and England. However, the conservative strain in Mendelssohn, which set him apart from some of his more flamboyant contemporaries, bred a corollary condescension amongst some of them toward his music. Mendelssohn's relations with Berlioz, Liszt and others had been uneasy and equivocal. Listeners who had raised questions about Mendelssohn's talent included Heinrich Heine, who wrote in 1836 after hearing the oratorio St. Paul that his work was

characterized by a great, strict, very serious seriousness, a determined, almost importunate tendency to follow classical models, the finest, cleverest calculation, sharp intelligence and, finally, complete lack of naïveté. But is there in art any originality of genius without naïveté?

Such criticism of Mendelssohn for his very ability – which could be characterised negatively as facility – was taken to further lengths by Richard Wagner. Mendelssohn's success, his popularity and his Jewish origins irked Wagner sufficiently to damn Mendelssohn with faint praise, three years after his death, in an anti-Jewish pamphlet Das Judenthum in der Musik:

[Mendelssohn] has shown us that a Jew may have the amplest store of specific talents, may own the finest and most varied culture, the highest and tenderest sense of honour – yet without all these pre-eminences helping him, were it but one single time, to call forth in us that deep, that heart-searching effect which we await from art [...] The washiness and the whimsicality of our present musical style has been [...] pushed to its utmost pitch by Mendelssohn's endeavour to speak out a vague, an almost nugatory Content as interestingly and spiritedly as possible. (Note: Echoes of such views survive today in critiques of Mendelssohn's alleged mediocrity. For a modern example see Damian Thompson, "Why did Mendelssohn lose his mojo?", The Daily Telegraph 11 November 2010, retrieved 25 September 2017).)

The philosopher Friedrich Nietzsche expressed consistent admiration for Mendelssohn's music, in contrast to his general scorn for "Teutonic" Romanticism:

At any rate, the whole music of romanticism [e.g. Schumann and Wagner] ... was second-rate music from the very start, and real musicians took little notice of it. Things were different with Felix Mendelssohn, that halcyon master who, thanks to his easier, purer, happier soul, was quickly honoured and just as quickly forgotten, as a lovely incident in German music.

Some readers, however, have interpreted Nietzsche's characterization of Mendelssohn as a 'lovely incident' as condescending.

In the 20th century the Nazi regime and its Reichsmusikkammer cited Mendelssohn's Jewish origin in banning performance and publication of his works, even asking Nazi-approved composers to rewrite incidental music for A Midsummer Night's Dream (Carl Orff obliged). Under the Nazis, "Mendelssohn was presented as a dangerous 'accident' of music history, who played a decisive role in rendering German music in the 19th century 'degenerate'." The German Mendelssohn Scholarship for students at the Leipzig Conservatoire was discontinued in 1934 (and not revived until 1963). The monument dedicated to Mendelssohn erected in Leipzig in 1892 was removed by the Nazis in 1936. A replacement was erected in 2008. The bronze statue of Mendelssohn by Clemens Buscher outside the Düsseldorf Opera House was also removed and destroyed by the Nazis in 1936. A replacement was erected in 2012. Mendelssohn's grave remained unmolested during the Nazi years.

Mendelssohn's reputation in Britain remained high throughout the 19th century. Prince Albert inscribed (in German) a libretto for the oratorio Elijah in 1847: "To the noble artist who, surrounded by the Baal-worship of false art, has been able, like a second Elijah, through genius and study, to remain true to the service of true art." In 1851 an adulatory novel by the teenaged Elizabeth Sara Sheppard was published, Charles Auchester. The book features as its leading character the "Chevalier Seraphel", an idealized portrait of Mendelssohn, and remained in print for nearly 80 years. In 1854, Queen Victoria requested that the Crystal Palace include a statue of Mendelssohn when it was rebuilt. (Note: It was the only statue in the Palace made of bronze and the only one to survive the 1936 fire that destroyed the Palace. The statue is now situated in Eltham College, London.) Mendelssohn's "Wedding March" from A Midsummer Night's Dream was played at the wedding of Queen Victoria's daughter, Victoria, Princess Royal, to Crown Prince Frederick William of Prussia in 1858, and it remains popular at marriage ceremonies. Mendelssohn's pupil Sterndale Bennett was a major force in British musical education until his death in 1875, and a great upholder of his master's traditions; he numbered among his pupils many of the next generation of English composers, including Sullivan, Hubert Parry and Francis Edward Bache.

By the early twentieth century, many critics, including Bernard Shaw, began to condemn Mendelssohn's music for its association with Victorian cultural insularity; Shaw in particular complained of the composer's "kid-glove gentility, his conventional sentimentality, and his despicable oratorio-mongering". In the 1950s the scholar Wilfrid Mellers complained of Mendelssohn's "spurious religiosity which reflected the element of unconscious humbug in our morality". A contrasting opinion came from the pianist and composer Ferruccio Busoni, who considered Mendelssohn "a master of undisputed greatness" and "an heir of Mozart". Busoni, like earlier virtuosi such as Anton Rubinstein and Charles-Valentin Alkan, regularly included Mendelssohn's piano works in his recitals.

=== Modern opinions ===
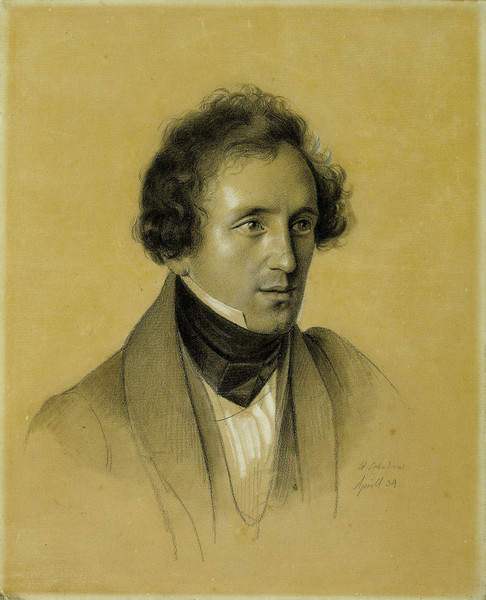
Felix Mendelssohn by Friedrich Wilhelm Schadow, 1834

Appreciation of Mendelssohn's work has developed since the mid-20th century, together with the publication of a number of biographies placing his achievements in context. Mercer-Taylor comments on the irony that "this broad-based reevaluation of Mendelssohn's music is made possible, in part, by a general disintegration of the idea of a musical canon", an idea which Mendelssohn "as a conductor, pianist and scholar" had done so much to establish. The critic H. L. Mencken concluded that, if Mendelssohn indeed missed true greatness, he missed it "by a hair".

Charles Rosen, in a chapter on Mendelssohn in his 1995 book The Romantic Generation, both praised and criticized the composer. He called him "the greatest child prodigy the history of Western music has ever known", whose command at age 16 surpassed that of Mozart or Chopin at 19, the possessor at an early age of a "control of large-scale structure unsurpassed by any composer of his generation", and a "genius" with a "profound" comprehension of Beethoven. Rosen believed that in the composer's later years, without losing his craft or genius, he "renounced ... his daring"; but he called Mendelssohn's relatively late Violin Concerto in E minor "the most successful synthesis of the Classical concerto tradition and the Romantic virtuoso form". Rosen considered the "Fugue in E minor" (later included in Mendelssohn's Op. 35 for piano) a "masterpiece"; but in the same paragraph called Mendelssohn "the inventor of religious kitsch in music". Nevertheless, he pointed out how the dramatic power of "the juncture of religion and music" in Mendelssohn's oratorios is reflected throughout the music of the next fifty years in the operas of Meyerbeer and Giuseppe Verdi and in Wagner's Parsifal.

A large portion of Mendelssohn's 750 works still remained unpublished in the 1960s, but most of them are now available. A scholarly edition of Mendelssohn's complete works and correspondence is in preparation but is expected to take many years to complete, and will be in excess of 150 volumes. This includes a modern and fully researched catalogue of his works, the Mendelssohn-Werkverzeichnis (MWV). Mendelssohn's oeuvre has been explored more deeply. (Note: See, for example, the conference "Viewing Mendelssohn, Viewing Elijah" held at Arizona State University in 2009 to mark the composer's bicentenary. Accessed 12 September 2021.) Recordings of virtually all of Mendelssohn's published works are now available, and his works are frequently heard in the concert hall and on broadcasts. R. Larry Todd noted in 2007, in the context of the impending bicentenary of Mendelssohn's birth, "the intensifying revival of the composer's music over the past few decades", and that "his image has been largely rehabilitated, as musicians and scholars have returned to this paradoxically familiar but unfamiliar European classical composer, and have begun viewing him from new perspectives."

== Notes and references ==
Notes

== Sources ==
- Barenboim, Lev Aronovich (1962). Anton Grigorevich Rubinstein (in Russian) (2 vols. ed.). Leningrad: State Musical Publishing House. OCLC 16655013.
- Barr, John (1978). The Officina Bodoni, Montagnola, Verona: Books Printed By Giovanni Mardersteig on the Hand Press, 1923–1977. London: The British Library. ISBN 978-0-7141-0398-3.
- Bennett, J.R. Sterndale (1907). The Life of Sterndale Bennett. Cambridge: Cambridge University Press. OCLC 59807054.
- Biddlecombe, George (2013). "Secret Letters and a Missing Memorandum: New Light on the Personal Relationship between Felix Mendelssohn and Jenny Lind". Journal of the Royal Musical Association. 138 (1): 47–83. doi:10.1080/02690403.2013.771961.
- Bloom, Peter, ed. (1987). Music in Paris in the eighteen thirties. Stuyvesant, New York: Pendragon Press. ISBN 0918728711.
- Brown, Clive (2003). A Portrait of Mendelssohn. New Haven and London: Yale University Press. ISBN 978-0-300-09539-5.
- Chorley, Henry (1972). Newman, Ernest (ed.). Thirty Years' Musical Recollections. New York: Vienna House. ISBN 978-0-8443-0026-9.
- Conway, David (2009). ""Short, Dark and Jewish-Looking": Felix Mendelssohn in Britain". In Massil, Stephen (ed.). The Jewish Year Book 2009. Valentine and Mitchell. ISBN 978-0-85303-890-0.
- Conway, David (2012). Jewry in Music: Entry to the Profession from the Enlightenment to Richard Wagner. Cambridge: Cambridge University Press. ISBN 978-1-107-01538-8.
- Daverio, John; Sams, Eric (2001). "Schumann, Robert". In Deane Root (ed.). Grove Music Online. Oxford University Press. doi:10.1093/gmo/9781561592630.article.40704. ISBN 978-1-56159-263-0.
- Devrient, Eduard (1869). My Recollections of Felix Mendelssohn-Bartholdy. Translated by N. MacFarren. London: Richard Bentley. OCLC 251991611.
- Duggan, Audrey (1998). A Sense of Occasion: Mendelssohn in Birmingham 1846. Studley: Brewin Books. ISBN 978-1-85858-127-9.
- Eatock, Colin (2009). Mendelssohn and Victorian England. Farnham, Surrey: Ashgate. ISBN 978-0-7546-6652-3.
- Emmett, William (1996). The national and religious song reader. New York: Haworth Press. ISBN 978-0-7890-0099-6.
- Firman, Rosemary (2004). "Bennett, Sir William Sterndale (1816–1875)". Oxford Dictionary of National Biography (online ed.). Oxford University Press. doi:10.1093/ref:odnb/2131. (Subscription, Wikipedia Library access or UK public library membership required.)
- Garratt, James (2004). "Mendelssohn and the Rise of Musical Historicism". In Mercer-Taylor, Peter (ed.). The Cambridge Companion to Mendelssohn. Cambridge: Cambridge University Press. pp. 55–70. ISBN 978-0-521-53342-3.
- Grimes, Nicole; Mace, Angela R. (2012). Mendelssohn perspectives. Farnham, Surrey: Ashgate Pub. ISBN 978-1-4094-2825-1.
- Hansen, Jörg; Vogt, Gerald (2009). "Blut und Geist": Bach, Mendelssohn und ihre Musik im Dritten Reich. Eisenach: Bachhaus Eisenach. ISBN 978-3-932257-06-3.
- Hensel, Sebastian (1884). The Mendelssohn Family (4th revised ed.). London: Sampson Low and Co. OCLC 655604542. 2 volumes. Edited by Felix's nephew, an important collection of letters and documents about the family.
- Hiller, Ferdinand (1874). Mendelssohn: Letters and Recollections. Translated by von Glehn, M.E. London: MacMillan and Co. OCLC 1019332582.
- Locke, Ralph P. (1986). Music, Musicians and the Saint-Simonians. Chicago and London: University of Chicago Press. ISBN 978-0-226-48902-5.
- Mellers, Wilfrid (1957). Romanticism and the Twentieth Century. London: Schocken Books. OCLC 869299807.
- Mendelssohn, Felix (1986). Elvers, R. (ed.). Felix Mendelssohn, A Life in Letters. Translated by Tomlinson, C. New York: Fromm International Publishing Corporation. ISBN 978-0-88064-060-2.
- Mercer-Taylor, Peter (2000). The Life of Mendelssohn. Cambridge: Cambridge University Press. ISBN 978-0-521-63972-9.
- Moscheles, Charlotte (1873). Life of Moscheles, with selections from his Diaries and Correspondence. London: Hirst and Blackett. OCLC 185148728.
- Nietzsche, Friedrich (2002). Beyond Good and Evil. Translated by Horstmann, Rolf-Peter; Norman, Judith. Cambridge: Cambridge University Press. ISBN 978-0-521-77078-1.
- Rosen, Charles (1995). The Romantic Generation. Harvard: Harvard University Press. ISBN 978-0-674-77933-4.
- Sanders, L.G.D. (1956). "Jenny Lind, Sullivan and the Mendelssohn Scholarship". Musical Times. 97 (1363): 466–467. doi:10.2307/936774. JSTOR 936774.
- Schoeps, Julius S. (2009). Das Erbe der Mendelssohns (in German). Frankfurt: S. Fischer Verlag. ISBN 978-3-10-073606-2.
- Smith, Ronald (2000). Alkan: The man, the music. London: Kahn & Averill. ISBN 978-1-871082-73-9.
- Spitta, Philipp (1972). Johann Sebastian Bach (3 vols.). Translated by Bell, Clara; Fuller-Maitland, J.A. New York: Dover Books. ISBN 978-0-486-27412-6.
- Stanley, Glenn (2004). "The music for keyboard". In Mercer-Taylor, Peter (ed.). The Cambridge Companion to Mendelssohn. Cambridge: Cambridge University Press. pp. 189–205. ISBN 978-0-521-53342-3.
- Steinberg, Michael (1998). The Concerto: A Listener's Guide. Oxford: Oxford University Press. ISBN 978-0-19-802634-1.
- Sterndale Bennett, R. (1955). "The Death of Mendelssohn". Music and Letters. 36 (4).
- Taruskin, Richard (2010). The Oxford History of Western Music. 3: Music in the Nineteenth Century. Oxford: Oxford University Press. ISBN 978-0-19-538483-3.
- Temperley, Nicholas (2008). "Overture". In Deane Root (ed.). Grove Music Online. Oxford University Press. doi:10.1093/gmo/9781561592630.article.20616. ISBN 978-1-56159-263-0.
- Todd, R. Larry, ed. (1991). Mendelssohn and his World. Princeton: Princeton University Press. ISBN 978-0-691-02715-9.
- Todd, R. Larry (2001). "Mendelssohn, Felix". In Deane Root (ed.). Grove Music Online. Oxford University Press. doi:10.1093/gmo/9781561592630.article.51795.
- Todd, R. Larry (2003). Mendelssohn – A Life in Music. Oxford; New York: Oxford University Press. ISBN 978-0-19-511043-2.
- Todd, R. Larry (2007). Mendelssohn Essays. New York and London: Routledge Taylor and Francis Group. ISBN 978-0-415-97814-9.
- Vitercik, Greg (2004). "Mendelssohn as Progressive". In Mercer-Taylor, Peter (ed.). The Cambridge Companion to Mendelssohn. Cambridge: Cambridge University Press. pp. 71–88. ISBN 978-0-521-53342-3.
- Wagner, Richard (1992). My Life. Translated by Grey, Andrew. New York: Da Capo. ISBN 978-0-306-80481-6.
- Wagner, Richard (1995). Judaism in Music and Other Essays. Translated by Ellis, W. Ashton. Lincoln, NE; London: University of Nebraska Press. ISBN 978-0-8032-9766-1.
- Werner, Eric (1963). Mendelssohn, A New Image of the Composer and his Age. New York; London: Free Press of Glencoe. OCLC 479241019.
- Youens, Susan (2004). "Mendelssohn's songs". In Mercer-Taylor, Peter (ed.). The Cambridge Companion to Mendelssohn. Cambridge: Cambridge University Press. pp. 189–205. ISBN 978-0-521-53342-3.
