= Octet (Mendelssohn) =

1836 string octet by Felix Mendelssohn

Octet in E♭ major
- by Felix Mendelssohn
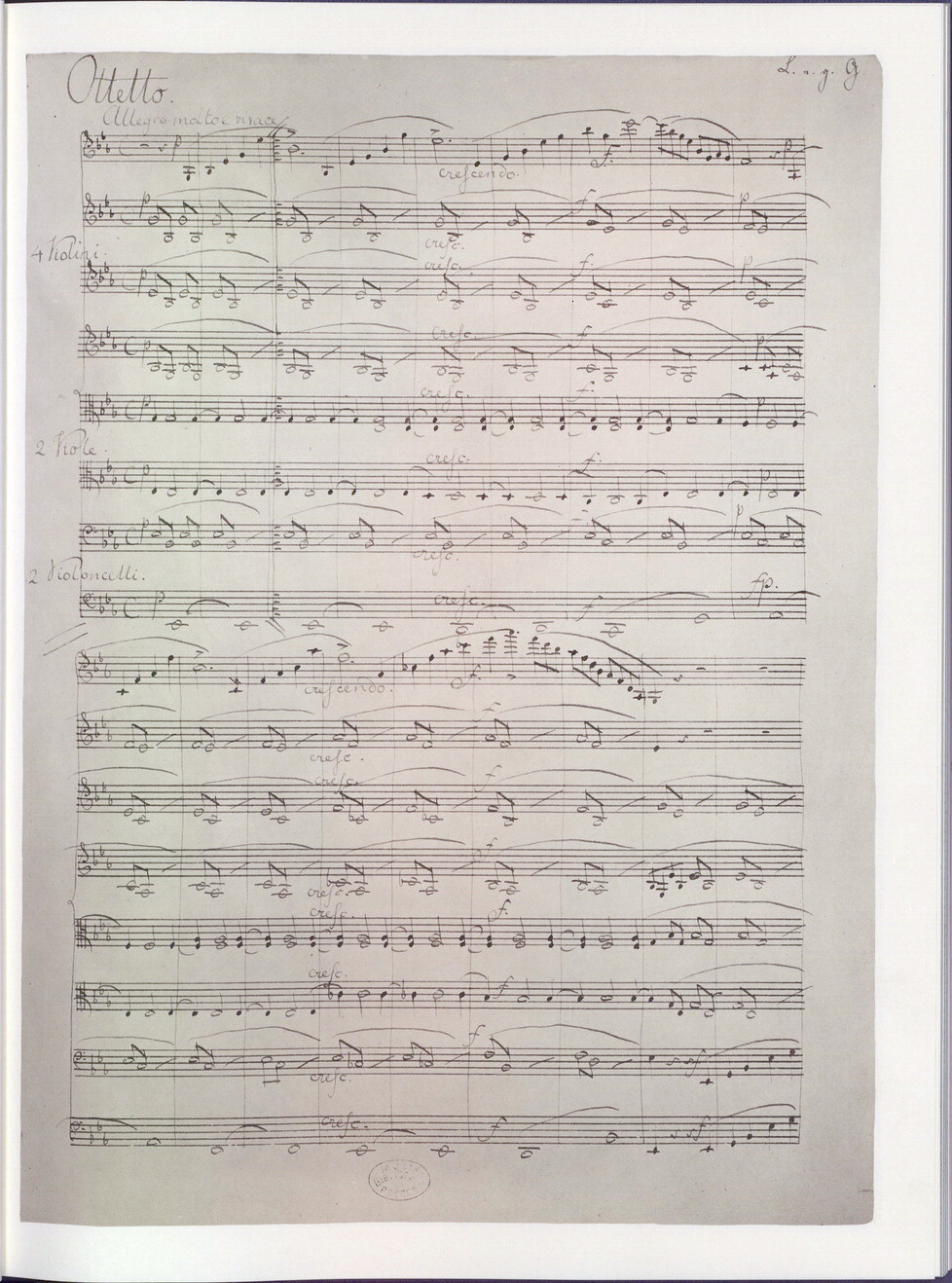
- First page of the autograph manuscript
- Key: E♭ major
- Opus: 20
- Composed: 1825
- Dedication: Eduard Ritz
- Performed: 30 January 1836
- Duration: about 30 minutes
- Movements: four
- Scoring: double string quartet (4 violins, 2 violas, 2 celli)

The String Octet in E♭ major, Op. 20, MWV R 20, was written by the 16-year-old Felix Mendelssohn during the fall of 1825 and completed on October 15. Written for four violins, two violas, and two cellos, this work created a new chamber music genre. Conrad Wilson summarizes much of its reception ever since: "Its youthful verve, brilliance and perfection make it one of the miracles of nineteenth-century music." This was one of the first works of Mendelssohn to be very well received.

== Background ==
Mendelssohn wrote his octet and gave a signed score to his friend and violin teacher Eduard Rietz as a birthday present. Rietz copied parts from the score to use for the premiere. This initial version differs from the more commonly performed score published in 1832 following edits made by Mendelssohn. The string octet was a fairly new genre of chamber music at the time, the most widely known genre of chamber music still being the string quartet. The genre was rapidly gaining popularity among other composers.

When Mendelssohn composed his octet, it was a rather new genre, and he may have been inspired by Louis Spohr's Double Quartet in D minor, Op. 65. But Spohr's double quartet was written with the two quartets playing apart from each other; Mendelssohn's octet is an undivided ensemble. In the score, Mendelssohn wrote that the piece should "be played by all the instruments in the style of a symphony."

== Structure ==
I. Allegro moderato ma con fuoco

II. Andante

III. Scherzo allegro leggierissimo

IV. Presto
Performed by the Amadeus Chamber Orchestra of Polish Radio

The work consists of four movements:

1. Allegro moderato ma con fuoco (E♭ major)
2. Andante (C minor)
3. Scherzo: Allegro leggierissimo (G minor)
4. Presto (E♭ major)

A typical performance of the work lasts around 30 minutes, with the first movement usually comprising roughly half of this. All four movements are in sonata form.

=== I. Allegro moderato ma con fuoco ===
The first movement's first theme begins above tremolo string accompaniment before being restated in the lower strings. A prolonged climax in the development builds from quiet whole notes into a flurry of sixteenth notes.

=== III. Scherzo. Allegro leggierissimo ===
The scherzo, later scored for orchestra as a replacement for the minuet in the composer's First Symphony at its premiere, is believed to have been inspired by the "Walpurgis Night's Dream" section of Goethe's Faust. Fragments of this movement recur in the finale, as a precursor to the "cyclic" technique later 19th-century composers employed. The entire work is also notable for its extended use of counterpoint, with the finale, in particular, beginning with an eight-part fugato. In this section, Mendelssohn quotes the melody of "And he shall reign forever and ever" from the "Hallelujah Chorus" of Handel's Messiah.

=== IV. Presto ===
The Presto begins with a fugal figure transferred across the eight instruments, from the second cello to the first violin, before being contrasted with an octave motif. In the development section, Mendelssohn reprises the scherzo's main theme in sequence.

== Instrumentation ==
The original score is for a double string quartet with four violins and pairs of violas and cellos. Mendelssohn wrote in the score, "This Octet must be played by all the instruments in symphonic orchestral style. Pianos and fortes must be strictly observed and more strongly emphasized than is usual in pieces of this character." He also transcribed the piece for piano duet with violin and cello ad. lib. and orchestrated the third movement (with alterations) as an alternative third movement to his Symphony No. 1 in C minor.

The piece is sometimes played by full string sections using more players for each part as well as a double bass that usually doubles the second cello part an octave lower. Arturo Toscanini created such a version for a performance with the NBC Symphony Orchestra in 1947. In 2009, conductor Yoon Jae Lee made a transcription of the first, second, and last movements for full orchestra.
