= Lenten veil =

Liturgical cloth covering the chancel during Lent

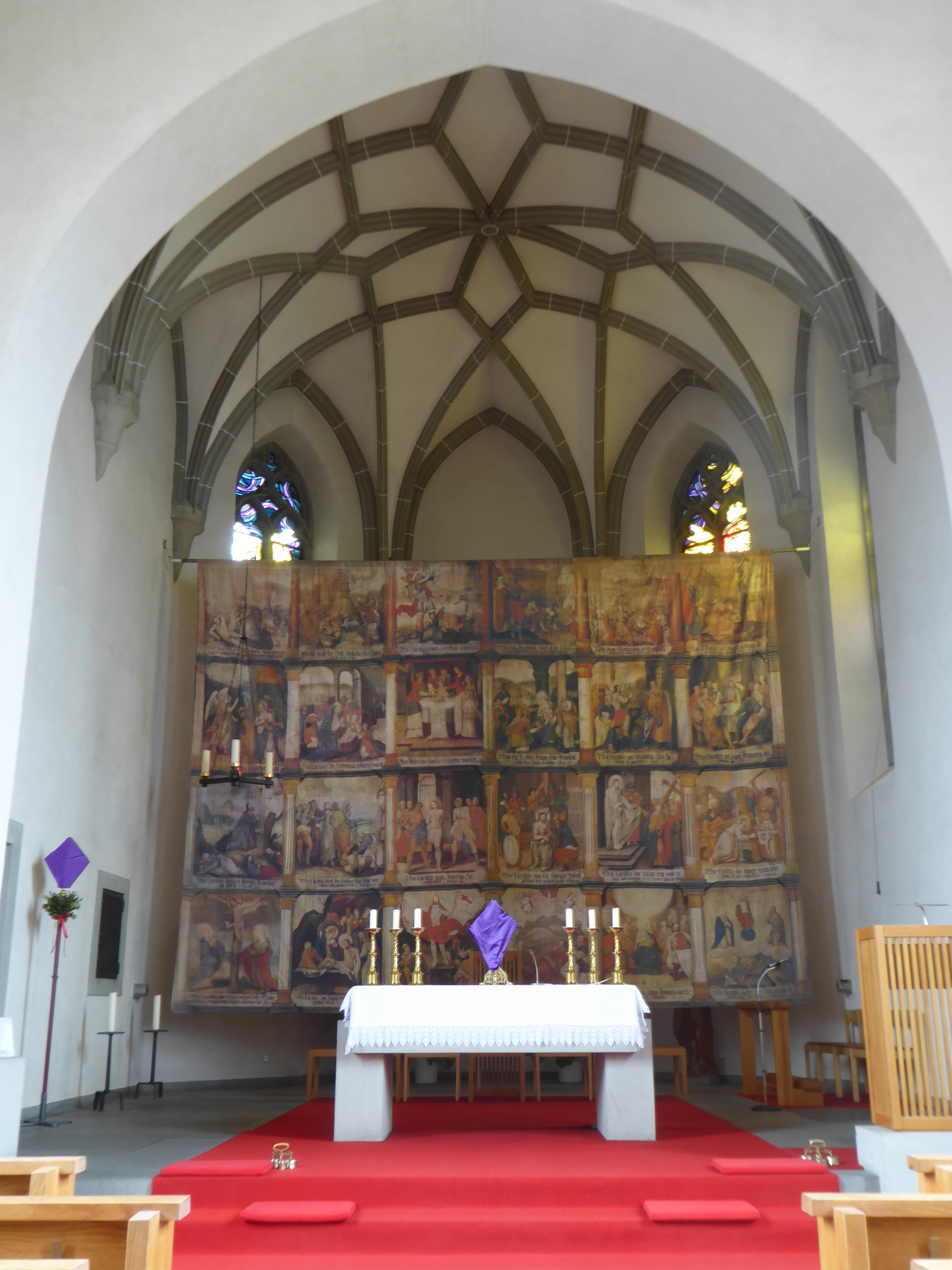
The 1983 replica of the 1612 Benderer Fastentuch, as hung in 2019 in Bendern in Liechtenstein

A Lenten veil (or Lenten cloth), known as a Fastentuch in German or velum quadragesimale in Latin, is a depiction of the Passion of Christ on a large veil which covers up a church chancel during Lent. Catholics and Lutherans observe the Christian tradition of the Lenten veil.

While the medieval tradition faded away, it has made an unexpected come-back in Germany since the German charity Misereor revamped it in 1976 as a tool to fight against world hunger, connecting prayer and almsgiving in the spirit of Lent.

== Liturgy ==
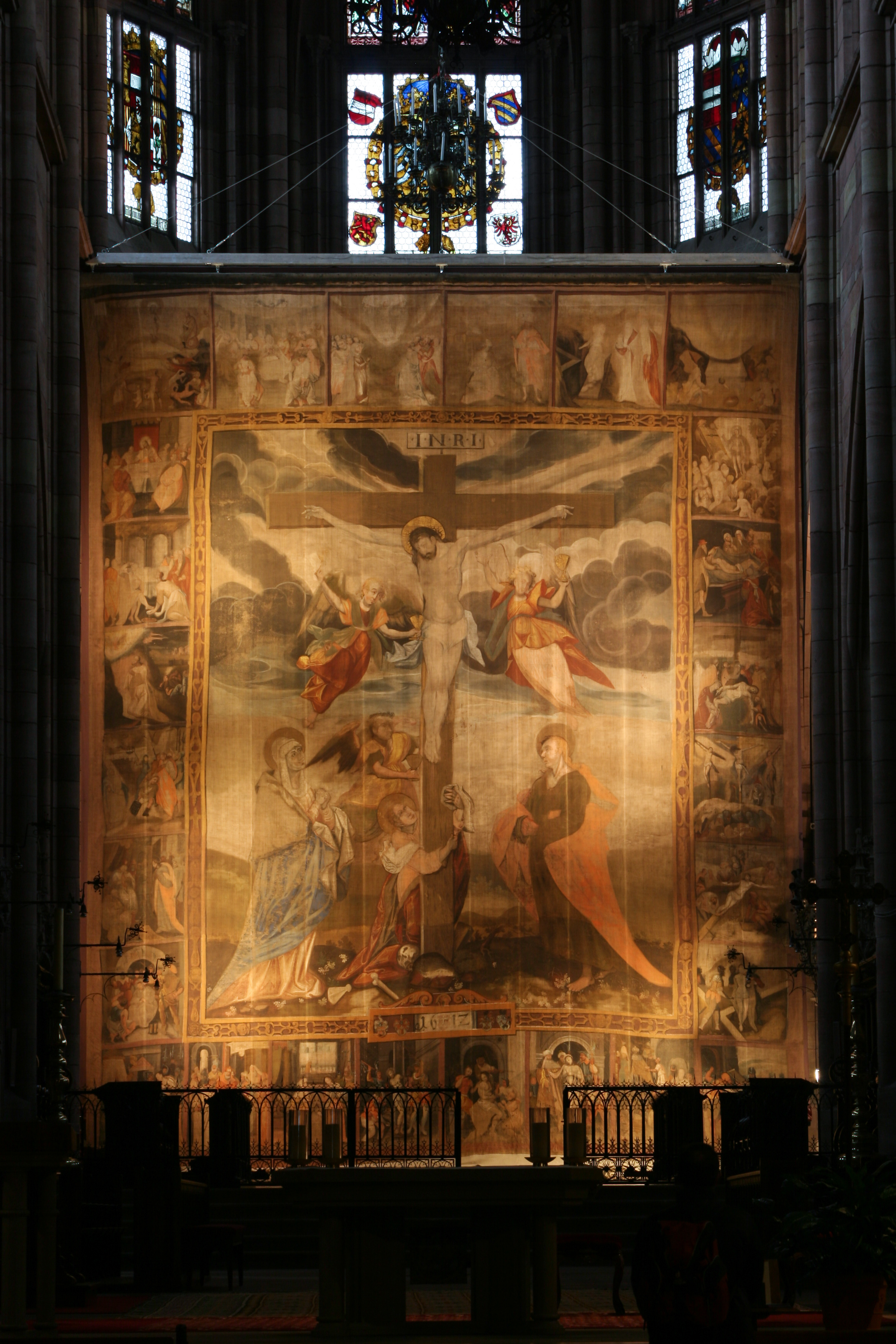
Fastentuch in Freiburg Minster

The Lenten cloth is usually hung in the choir (quire) throughout Lent. In some churches it is placed before Passion Sunday or Palm Sunday.

The veil visually separates the congregation from the chancel and its decorations and while the congregation can no longer see the liturgy, all its attention is focused on listening; it is a form of visual penance.

The Lenten cloth is usually hung on after Compline on the first Sunday of Lent and remains until Compline on Wednesday during Holy Week. It is withdrawn on Sundays and during special services such as ordinations, and regionally also during the elevation at Holy Mass on weekdays. Some Lenten cloths are divided in the middle and can be pulled apart on either side.

== History ==
=== An Eastern tradition ===
The origin of the Lenten veil can be linked back to the story of the Peregrinatio Aetheriae, in which the author, Egeria, narrates her journey to the Holy Land in the 4th century. In the eastern churches, the rite of the burial of Christ involved the emotional involvement of the faithful thanks to the skillful use of shrouds and painted canvases. As also stated in the Armenian lectionary, a liturgical text from the 9th century which summarizes the uses of previous centuries, in describing a ceremony in which the cross was bathed and wrapped in cloth; later this cloth was placed on the altar and offered for adoration by the faithful, like a shroud. A similar rite is also found in the Syrian and Coptic tradition.

In Armenian Orthodox churches to this day, the choir curtain is drawn during the entire period of Great Lent. The Divine Liturgy is celebrated out of sight of the faithful and the Eucharist is not distributed. This, as a sign of mourning and expulsion from Paradise (the first Sunday of Great Lent is aptly called "Expulsion Sunday").

=== Expansion to Europe of a painted cloth ===
Although only a few examples have come down to us, the practice of decorating churches with painted canvases, especially during Lent, spread to many European countries starting from the fifteenth century.

The book of customs or “Consuetudines” of Farfa Abbey, a Benedictine abbey close to Rome in Italy which traces itself back to Syrian origins, also provides one of the earliest mentions of the Lenten veil in Europe around the year 1000. Until the 12th century, this remained a purely symbolic object made of plain fabric - often linen, also silk - which was only decorated in individual cases with ornamental embroidery. The Lenten cloth was then discovered as a form of Christian art, which remained productive for several centuries. A description from 1493 shows that a Lenten cloth with artistic depictions (no longer preserved) was created between 1126 and 1149 in the monastery of St. Ulrich and Afra in Augsburg. Appreciated for the ease of installation and the scenographic effect, the function of these canvases was to hide the altar from the beginning of Lent or Passion Sunday until Holy Wednesday or Saturday.

=== Alpine inculturation of the Lenten patchwork in the 15th century ===
As the tradition expanded to the Nord, the Alpine tradition changed the materials of the Lenten veil around the 15th century. The Alpine Lenten patchwork consists of several horizontally sewn strips of solid canvas, which were already painted with tempera paints in the practice of so-called cloth painting. This created an early form of cloth painting, while the most common painting surface remained wood until the 15th century. An artistic highlight is the Lenten cloth in the Romanesque cathedral in Gurk dating back to 1458, which shows 99 individual motifs in horizontally arranged stripes. In its combination of motifs and narrative image structure, it is a typical example of sequential art. The Lenten cloth is usually a plain cloth or one made with white embroidery and also decorated with biblical images.

=== The enrichment of the Passion veil in Northern Europe ===
As its moved north in Europe, the Lenten veil became more and more elaborate as early as the 12th century. The creators of Lenten cloths from Westphalia and Lower Saxony retained linen as a material and embroidery as a working technique, but changed the design by depicting individual motifs on smaller rectangles that were connected by linen bars - a patchwork carpet or textile mosaic. Occasionally, painting was also attempted on tightly stretched linen. Based on the North German tradition, motifs from the Passion of Christ gradually became established. A central theme since the 16th century was the depiction of the crucifixion of Christ; The composition of the image incorporated the Arma Christi (the instruments of Christ's suffering). This reveals a paradox between theological and artistic ideas, as the Lenten cloth had previously served to temporarily conceal the sight of the crucifix. The Marienfelder Lenten cloth became a standard Lenten veil and served as a template for several other Lenten cloths in Münsterland in the 19th century. There are still some based on this model today in Billerbeck St. Johanni, Lüdinghausen St. Felizitas, Nordwalde St. Dionysius and Warendorf St. Laurentius.

=== Decline after the Reformation to renewal after Vatican II ===
In the wake of the Protestant Reformation, Martin Luther was critical of the Lenten Veil, though as with other pre-Reformation customs, the use of the Lenten veil continued in many Lutheran congregations. However, the production and attachment of a Lenten cloth was - with a few exceptions - declined in other Lutheran areas and though it was maintained as a religious custom in Catholic areas until the 18th century, it gradually faded away. While Lenten veils had almost fallen into oblivion or become merely museum pieces by the 20th century, the tradition was unexpectedly revived in Germany in the 1970s.

The use of Lenten veils was uninterrupted in many localities, as in Sicily where the opening of the Lenten curtain during the Easter tradition is an established popular tradition. Also, Lenten shrouds remained a universal use of the Catholic, Lutheran and certain Anglican traditions as a form of visual penance derived from the Lenten veil.

== Geographical variations ==
=== Germany ===
Lenten veils, which were rather simple until then, became more ornamented tapestries as they developed in Germany and Flanders after the 12th century, In Germany, the cathedral of Our Lady of Fribourg preserves the largest Lenten veil known in Europe. Dating to 1612, it measures more than 10 by 12 meters and weighs almost one ton. The central scene of the crucifixion is surrounded by 25 squares containing various episodes of the Passion.

In 2007, the Catholic parish of Herz Jesu in Bernau near Berlin worked with young people to create the largest hunger cloth in the world to date in a 48-hour campaign with a “Fastentuch XXL” (over 220 m^{2}). That same year, a Lenten cloth was hung in Bonn Cathedral for the first time, created by the Worms photographer and graphic artist Norbert Bach. It refers to the year of Elizabeth and links the history of St. Elizabeth with other works of mercy.

In 2015 there is a Lenten cloth from 1584, 195 × 135 cm, in the Church of St. Nicholas in Bad Kreuznach. The linen cloth with embroidery was mentioned as early as 1900 in a church guide to St. Nicholas written under Pastor Johann-Benedikt Kirsch. In 2016 a new Lenten cloth was created for the Evangelical Lutheran Church of the Garden Church of St. Marien in Hanover created by the textile artist Constanze Rilke. At 7 × 4 meters it shows a “sea of flowers” that refers to the gardens of the Bible and thus takes up the name of the church (Garden Church).

=== Switzerland ===
The Lenten cloth of the Catholic town church of St. Martin in Rheinfelden, Switzerland (3.24 x 2.53 m) remained hidden in the church altar for over 400 years and was only discovered by chance in 1977 as part of a civil defense exercise. It is the only old Lenten cloth currently known to exist in Switzerland. However, it may be that other paintings, such as the Sachsler meditation cloth painted by Nicholas of Flüe, were also created as a fasting cloth.

=== Italy ===
In Italy, during the first quarter of the 16th century, the practice of displaying the canvas of the Passion spread among the Confraternity of the Disciplined. In Genoa, the Diocesan Museum houses a cycle of paintings from the Abbey of San Nicolò del Boschetto, dated from 1538, composed of 14 canvases dyed with indigo and painted in white lead on a monochrome background with the chiaroscuro technique; of various sizes, the largest measures 460 x 450 cm.

"Â calata 'a tila" is a rite performed in Sicily which involves the sudden unveiling of the presbytery during the Easter night vigil at the pronouncement of the Gloria in excelsis Deo, to figuratively represent and show the risen Christ. It is a common rite in many parishes of the Sicilian dioceses, obsolete and recently in the process of being deliberately restored. The introduction in Sicily of the Lenten veil can be traced back to the work of the missionaries of the Teutonic Order who arrived in Palermo and Messina thanks to the will, support and consideration of Roger I of Sicily, which took place after the Norman reconquest of Sicily. In Palermo, at the Church of San Domenico of the Dominican Order, in very close relationship with the Teutonic Order, it is possible to admire during the Lenten season a monumental canvas of the Passion, one of the grandest in Italy and Europe.

In Sicily, this custom was highly developed from the 19th century to the beginning of the 20th, especially in the Amastratino-Madonita area (Mistretta, Gratteri, Petralia); the canvases are here called taledda or tuluni and the rite reaches its peak on Holy Saturday when the altar is revealed during the Gloria in excelsis Deo.

=== Spain ===
The Lenten cloth in the church of Villoslada de Cameros in the Autonomous Region of La Rioja, created around 1560, is clearly of Flemish origin.

== Bibliography ==
- Markus Aronica: Passion in Weiß. Das Freiburger Fastentuch – eine geistliche Einführung. Promo Verlag, Freiburg im Breisgau 2013, ISBN 978-3-923288-77-9.
