= Psalm 43 =

Biblical psalm

- "Judge me, O God, and plead my cause against an ungodly nation"
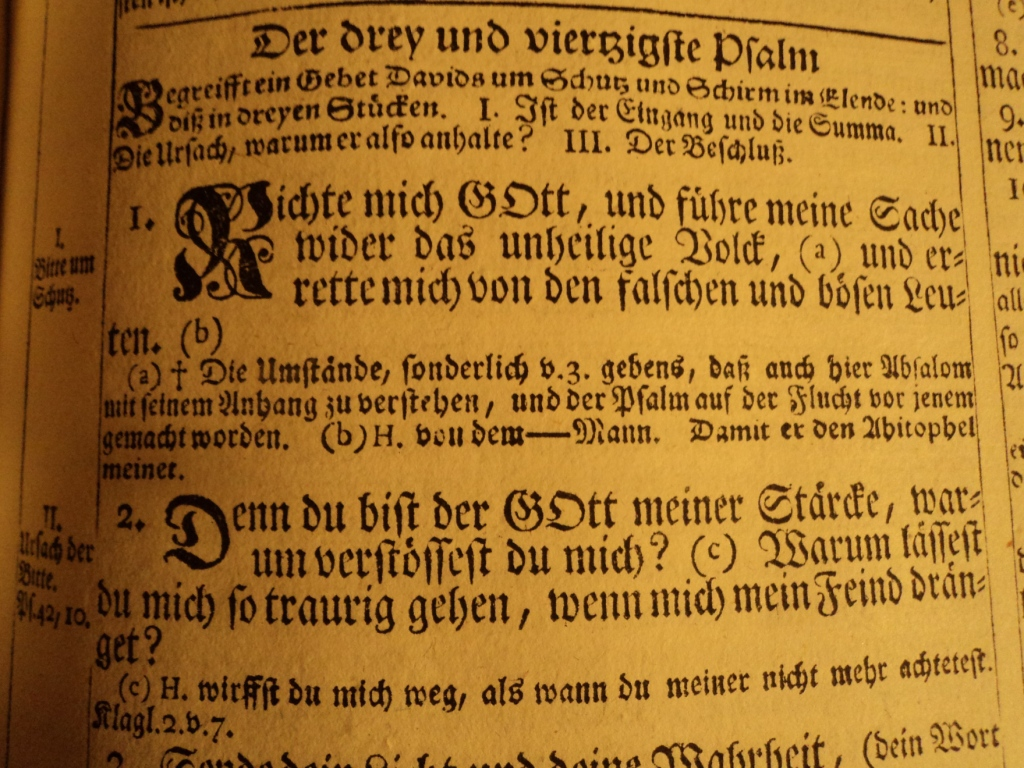
- Beginning of Psalm 43 in a German Kurfürstenbibel from 1768
- Other name: Psalm 42; "Iudica me Deus"
- Language: Hebrew (original)

Psalm 43
- ← Psalm 42 Psalm 44 →
- Book: Book of Psalms
- Hebrew Bible part: Ketuvim
- Order in the Hebrew part: 1
- Category: Sifrei Emet
- Christian Bible part: Old Testament
- Order in the Christian part: 19

Psalm 43 is the 43rd psalm of the Book of Psalms, known in the English King James Version as "Judge me, O God, and plead my cause against an ungodly nation". In the slightly different numbering system used in the Greek Septuagint and Latin Vulgate translations of the Bible, this psalm is Psalm 42. In Latin, it is known as "Iudica me Deus". It is commonly attributed to the sons of Korah. In the Hebrew Bible, it comes within the second of the five books (divisions) of Psalms, also known as the "Elohistic Psalter" because the word YHWH is rarely used and God is generally referred to as "Elohim".

The psalm forms a regular part of Catholic liturgy.

== Uses ==
=== Catholic Church ===
This psalm was traditionally recited or sung, following the Rule of St. Benedict of 530 AD, in the Office for the Lauds of Tuesday, following Psalm 50.

Traditionally, a priest would recite the psalm before he ascended the altar to celebrate Mass. In the Roman Rite, the traditional Tridentine Mass has the psalm said by the priest and altar servers in call-and-response format, as part of prayers at the foot of the altar which initiated the Mass of the Catechumens. It is not said at Requiem Masses and Masses in Passiontide, as the fifth Sunday in Lent instead has the psalm for its Introit. Recitation of this psalm at the start of Mass was discontinued in 1964, with the Instruction on Implementing Liturgical Norms, Inter Oecumenici.

In the present Liturgy of the Hours, Psalm 43 is recited or sung at Lauds on the Tuesday of the second week in the four-week psalter.

=== Coptic Orthodox Church ===
In the Agpeya, the Coptic Church's book of hours, this psalm is prayed in the office of Terce. It is also in the Prayer of the Veil, which is generally prayed only by monks.

=== Book of Common Prayer ===
In the Church of England's Book of Common Prayer, this psalm is appointed to be read on the evening of the eighth day of the month.

== Text ==
The following table shows the Hebrew text of the Psalm with vowels, alongside the Koine Greek text in the Septuagint and the English translation from the King James Version. Note that the meaning can slightly differ between these versions, as the Septuagint and the Masoretic Text come from different textual traditions. (Note: A 1917 translation directly from Hebrew to English by the Jewish Publication Society can be found here or here, and an 1844 translation directly from the Septuagint by L. C. L. Brenton can be found here. Both translations are in the public domain.) In the Septuagint, this psalm is numbered Psalm 42.

#	Hebrew	English	Greek
1	שׇׁפְטֵ֤נִי אֱלֹהִ֨ים ׀ וְרִ֘יבָ֤ה רִיבִ֗י מִגּ֥וֹי לֹֽא־חָסִ֑יד מֵ֤אִישׁ מִרְמָ֖ה וְעַוְלָ֣ה תְפַלְּטֵֽנִי׃	Judge me, O God, and plead my cause against an ungodly nation: O deliver me from the deceitful and unjust man.	Ψαλμὸς τῷ Δαυΐδ. - ΚΡΙΝΟΝ με, ὁ Θεός, καὶ δίκασον τὴν δίκην μου ἐξ ἔθνους οὐχ ὁσίου· ἀπὸ ἀνθρώπου ἀδίκου καὶ δολίου ῥῦσαί με.
2	כִּֽי־אַתָּ֤ה ׀ אֱלֹהֵ֣י מָֽעוּזִּי֮ לָמָ֢ה זְנַ֫חְתָּ֥נִי לָֽמָּה־קֹדֵ֥ר אֶתְהַלֵּ֗ךְ בְּלַ֣חַץ אוֹיֵֽב׃	For thou art the God of my strength: why dost thou cast me off? why go I mourning because of the oppression of the enemy?	ὅτι σὺ εἶ ὁ Θεὸς κραταίωμά μου· ἱνατί ἀπώσω με; καὶ ἱνατί σκυθρωπάζων πορεύομαι ἐν τῷ ἐκθλίβειν τὸν ἐχθρόν μου;
3	שְׁלַח־אוֹרְךָ֣ וַ֭אֲמִתְּךָ הֵ֣מָּה יַנְח֑וּנִי יְבִיא֥וּנִי אֶל־הַֽר־קׇ֝דְשְׁךָ֗ וְאֶל־מִשְׁכְּנוֹתֶֽיךָ׃	O send out thy light and thy truth: let them lead me; let them bring me unto thy holy hill, and to thy tabernacles.	ἐξαπόστειλον τὸ φῶς σου καὶ τὴν ἀλήθειάν σου· αὐτά με ὡδήγησαν καὶ ἤγαγόν με εἰς ὄρος ἅγιόν σου καὶ εἰς τὰ σκηνώματά σου.
4	וְאָב֤וֹאָה ׀ אֶל־מִזְבַּ֬ח אֱלֹהִ֗ים אֶל־אֵל֮ שִׂמְחַ֢ת גִּ֫ילִ֥י וְאוֹדְךָ֥ בְכִנּ֗וֹר אֱלֹהִ֥ים אֱלֹהָֽי׃	Then will I go unto the altar of God, unto God my exceeding joy: yea, upon the harp will I praise thee, O God my God.	καὶ εἰσελεύσομαι πρὸς τὸ θυσιαστήριον τοῦ Θεοῦ, πρὸς τὸν Θεὸν τὸν εὐφραίνοντα τὴν νεότητά μου· ἐξομολογήσομαί σοι ἐν κιθάρᾳ, ὁ Θεός, ὁ Θεός μου.
5	מַה־תִּשְׁתּ֬וֹחֲחִ֨י ׀ נַפְשִׁי֮ וּֽמַה־תֶּהֱמִ֢י עָ֫לָ֥י הוֹחִ֣ילִי לֵ֭אלֹהִים כִּי־ע֣וֹד אוֹדֶ֑נּוּ יְשׁוּעֹ֥ת פָּ֝נַ֗י וֵאלֹהָֽי׃	Why art thou cast down, O my soul? and why art thou disquieted within me? hope in God: for I shall yet praise him, who is the health of my countenance, and my God.	ἱνατί περίλυπος εἶ, ἡ ψυχή μου; καὶ ἱνατί συνταράσσεις με; ἔλπισον ἐπὶ τὸν Θεόν, ὅτι ἐξομολογήσομαι αὐτῷ· σωτήριον τοῦ προσώπου μου καὶ ὁ Θεός μου.

=== Verse 1 ===
Vindicate me, O God,
And plead my cause against an ungodly nation;
Oh, deliver me from the deceitful and unjust man!

"An ungodly nation" comes from words literally meaning a nation without Chesed, meaning kindness or love between people. Alexander Kirkpatrick notes that the "deceitful and unjust man" may be the leader of this nation, who may have "distinguished himself by treachery and malignity", but "it is better to understand the words collectively as a further description of the 'inhuman nation' in general, men of deceit and malignity".

== Latin translations ==
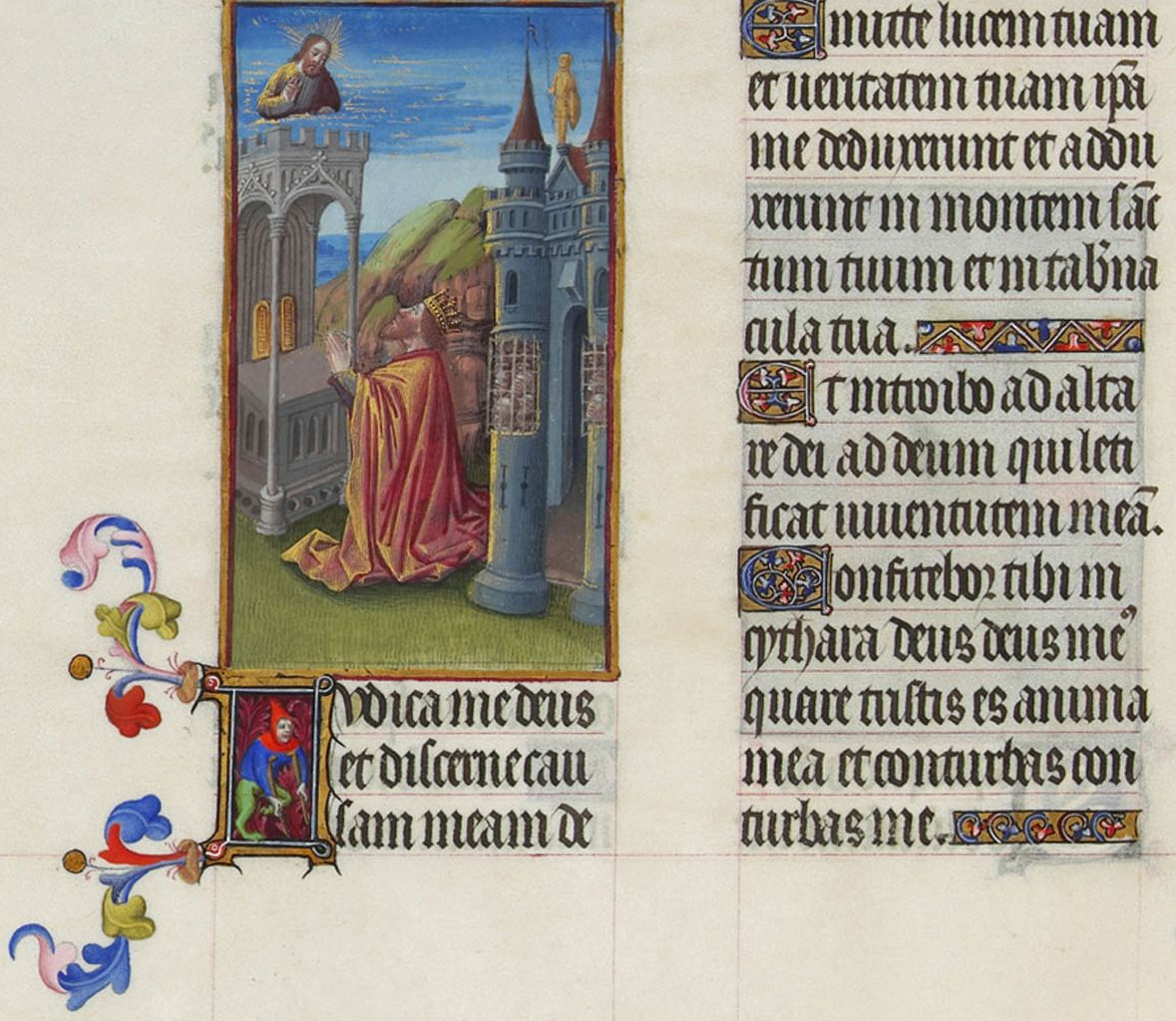
Psalm 43 in Les Très Riches Heures du duc de Berry, Folio 61v - Psalm XLII (Vulgate) the Musée Condé, Chantilly.

=== Clementine Vulgate ===
The Clementine Vulgate was officially adopted as part of the Roman Breviary in 1592. The complete psalm is used in dialogue form in the prayers at the foot of the altar, which almost always begin the Tridentine Mass.

Judica me, Deus, et discerne causam meam de gente non sancta: ab homine iniquo et doloso erue me. Quia tu es, Deus, fortitudo mea: quare me repulisti? et quare tristis incedo, dum affligit me inimicus? Emitte lucem tuam et veritatem tuam: ipsa me deduxerunt, et adduxerunt in montem sanctum tuum, et in tabernacula tua. Et introibo ad altare Dei, ad Deum qui laetificat juventutem meam. Confitebor tibi in cithara, Deus, Deus meus. Quare tristis es, anima mea? et quare conturbas me? Spera in Deo, quoniam adhuc confitebor illi, salutare vultus mei, et Deus meus.

=== Pian translation ===
The Pian psalter or Versio Piana was completed in 1945 and printed in most breviaries thereafter.

Ius redde mihi, Deus, et age causam meam adversus gentem non sanctam; ab homine doloso et iniquo libera me, Quia tu es, Deus, fortitudo mea: Quare me reppulisti? Quare tristis incedo, ab inimico oppressus? Emitte lucem tuam et fidelitatem tuam: ipsae me ducant, adducant me in montem sanctum tuum et in tabernacula tua. Et introibo ad altare Dei, ad Deum laetitiae et exsultationis meae, Et laudabo te cum cithara, Deus, Deus meus! Quare deprimeris, anima mea, et tumultuaris in me? Spera in Deum: quia rursus celebrabo eum, Salutem vultus mei et Deum meum.

=== Nova Vulgata ===
The Nova Vulgata, a new translation from the Hebrew was completed in 1979 for liturgical use. It is the version used in the current typical edition of the Liturgia Horarum.

Iúdica me, Deus, et discérne causam meam de gente non sancta; ab hómine iníquo et dolóso érue me. Quia tu es Deus refúgii mei; quare me reppulísti, et quare tristis incédo, dum afflígit me inimícus? Emítte lucem tuam et veritátem tuam;ipsæ me dedúcant et addúcant in montem sanctum tuum et in tabernácula tua. Et introíbo ad altáre Dei, ad Deum lætítiæ exsultatiónis meæ. Confitébor tibi in cíthara, Deus, Deus meus. Quare tristis es, ánima mea, et quare conturbáris in me? Spera in Deo, quóniam adhuc confitébor illi, salutáre vultus mei et Deus meus.

=== Stuttgart Vulgate ===
The Stuttgart Vulgate, completed in 1969, is a non-liturgical version translated for scholarly use.

Iudica me Deus et discerne causam meam a gente non sancta a viro doloso et iniquo salva me. Tu enim Deus fortitudo mea quare proiecisti me quare tristis incedo adfligente inimico. Mitte lucem tuam et veritatem tuam ipsae ducent me et introducent ad montem sanctum tuum et ad tabernaculum tuum. Et introibo ad altare tuum ad Deum laetitiae et exultationis meae. Et confitebor tibi in cithara Deus Deus meus, quare incurvaris anima mea et quare conturbas me? Expecta Dominum quoniam adhuc confitebor ei salutibus vultus mei et Deo meo.

== Musical settings ==
Heinrich Schütz wrote a setting of a paraphrase in German, "Gott, führ mein Sach und richte mich", SWV 140, for the Becker Psalter, published first in 1628. Michel Richard Delalande wrote a grand motet (S.38) to this psalm in 1693. Charles-Hubert Gervais set a Grand motet Judica me Deus in 1723.
