= Art in America (band) =

American progressive rock band

- Origin: Detroit, Michigan, United States
- Genres: Progressive rock, pop
- Years active: 1980–present
- Label: Iconoclassic Records / Pavillion Records
- Members: Chris Flynn; Daniel Flynn; Shishonee Flynn
- Past members: Jim Kuha; Garry Galloway
- Website: www.artinamericamusic.com

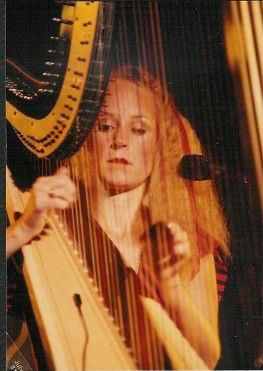
Shishonee Flynn, in concert

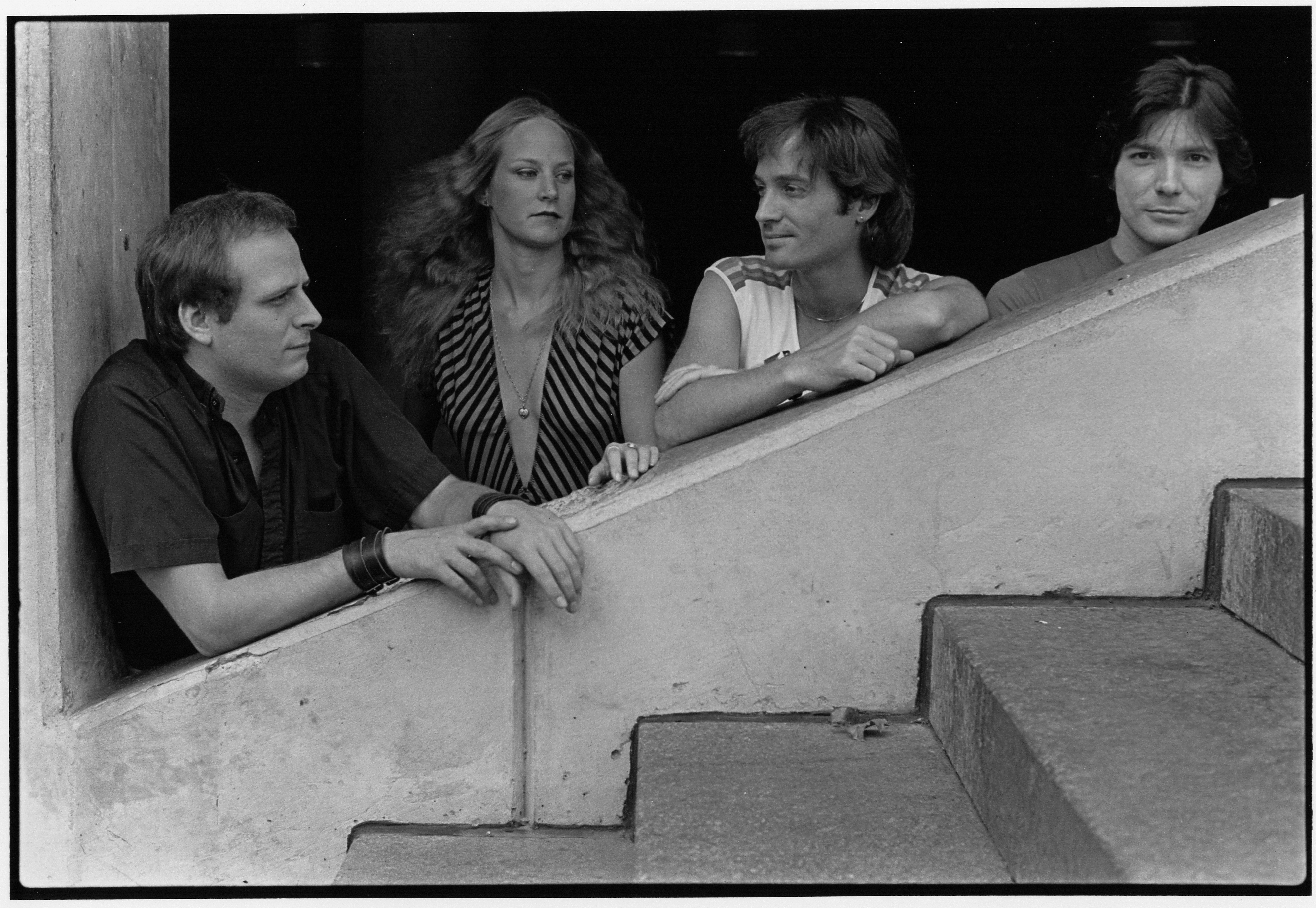
Art in America 1983

Art in America is an American progressive rock band that achieved success in the early 1980s. They are best known for their self-titled song "Art in America" released in 1983.

== Background ==
The band was the first-known rock band featuring a pedal harp to appear on a major record label. Art in America was formed in 1980 by brothers Chris Flynn and Dan Flynn and sister Shishonee (real name Ruetenik). Harpist Shishonee, was formerly a member of the band The Trees Community. Joining Art in America was friend Jim Kuha. Originally called Father, the band's name was changed to 'Art in America' and under this name the group began opening for popular Irish & English pop artists such as U2 and Roxy Music. In 1983, the group released their first studio album under Sony Music/Pavilion Records. Produced by Yes and Emerson, Lake and Palmer producer Eddy Offord, the album contained their most popular song "Art in America" which received airplay on MTV music television, and radio stations throughout the United States. The songs were co-arranged by Steve Morse who also contributed a guitar solo for the song "Undercover Lover". The guest keyboardist on the album was Terry "T" Lavitz.

In hopes of a better deal in releasing a second album, the band moved to Los Angeles in 1985. However, the band found the pay to play gig situation in Los Angeles to be hostile and disappointing. The band still records music and loads to many internet sites for free song streaming, as well as album and singles for purchase.

In 2011 the band was contacted by producer David Hentschel to finally record a follow-up studio album. The album was first released in 2013, as The Hentschel Sessions and then re-released as Cloudborn with artwork and additional tracks in 2018.

In 2025, the group re-released their debut album, newly remastered by Vic Anesini as well as a studio album called "Rise". The album consists of re-recorded songs which were originally recorded in 1983 and intended as the follow up to their debut album. In 2026 the group released a new album containing all new songs called "Dreams of the Disappeared". Jim Kuha is absent from this album, reducing the band to just the trio of the Flynn siblings.

== Personnel ==
=== Current members ===
- Chris Flynn – Vocals, Lead guitar – Fender Stratocaster – (1974), Rickenbacker 330 12 string
- Shishonee Flynn – Lyon & Healy Pedal Harp, Koto, Tamboura
- Daniel Flynn – Drums – Fibes Drums, Gamelan bell tree, percussion

=== Past members ===
- Jim Kuha – Bass Rickenbacker 4001, Moog Taurus bass pedals, 12-string guitar – Ovation
- Garry Galloway – Keyboards Korg, Yamaha, Akai and Mellotron

== Discography ==
=== Albums ===
Studio albums

- Art in America (1983) No. 176 on the US Billboard 200.
- Cloudborn (2018)
- Rise (2025)
- Art in America (2025) Expanded & Remastered Edition
- Dreams of the Disappeared (2026)

Live albums

- Art in America – Performing live at the Royal Oak Music Theatre on March 8, 1983 Wolfgang's Vault
- Art in America – Performing live at the Capitol Theater, Flint, Michigan on May 8, 1983 King Biscuit Flower Hour

=== Singles ===
- "Art in America" (1983) No. 23 on the US Mainstream Rock charts
- "Undercover Lover" (1983) No. 33 on the US Mainstream Rock charts

=== Album art ===
The cover for the self-titled debut (commissioned and painted by Ioannis) is featured in the book 1000 Record Covers by Michael Ochs, and published by Taschen. In 2018, in a reprise of his participation with the group, Ioannis commissioned the cover for Cloudborn.

In 2025 the new album "Rise" features front and back cover art by band member Daniel Flynn painted in acrylic.
