= Psalm 42 =

Biblical psalm

- "As the hart panteth after the water brooks"
- Hymn psalm
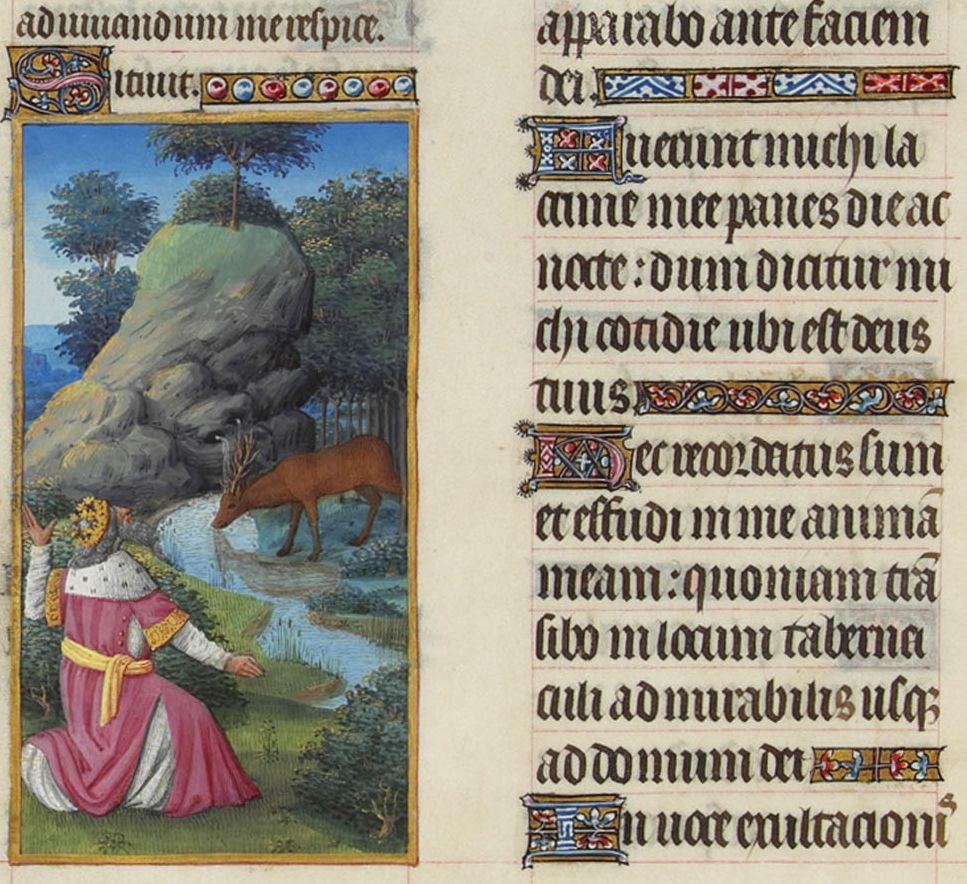
- Psalm 42 in Les Très Riches Heures du duc de Berry (fol. 97v), with an illustration of a drinking hart
- Other name: Psalm 41; "Quemadmodum desiderat cervus"; "Sicut cervus"; "Like as the hart"; "As pants the hart"
- Language: Hebrew (original)

Psalm 42
- ← Psalm 41 Psalm 43 →
- Book: Book of Psalms
- Hebrew Bible part: Ketuvim
- Order in the Hebrew part: 1
- Category: Sifrei Emet
- Christian Bible part: Old Testament
- Order in the Christian part: 19

Psalm 42 is the 42nd psalm of the Book of Psalms, often known in English by its incipit, "As the hart panteth after the water brooks" (in the King James Version). The Book of Psalms is part of the third section of the Hebrew Bible, and a book of the Christian Old Testament. In the Hebrew Bible, Psalm 42 opens the second of the five books (divisions) of Psalms, also known as the "Elohistic Psalter" because the word YHWH is rarely used and God is generally referred to as "Elohim".

In the slightly different numbering system used in the Greek Septuagint version of the bible, and generally in its Latin translations, this psalm is Psalm 41, although the Nova Vulgata translation follows the Hebrew numbering. The psalm is a hymn psalm. It is one of twelve psalms attributed to the sons of Korah.

In Latin, its incipit in the Psalterium Gallicanum (the version in the Roman Breviary until the optional introduction of the Versio Piana in 1945) is Quemadmodum desiderat cervus; but Sicut cervus in the Psalterium Romanum. It begins "As pants the hart" in the English metrical version by Tate and Brady (1696) and in Coverdale's translation in the Book of Common Prayer, "Like as the hart".

The psalm forms a regular part of Jewish, Catholic, Lutheran, Anglican and other Protestant liturgies and has often been set to music, notably in Palestrina's Sicut cervus, Handel's As pants the hart and Mendelssohn's Psalm 42.

== Background and themes ==
While the psalm is attributed to the "sons of Korah", the text is written in the first person singular. The psalm can be divided into two parts, each ending with the same line (verses 6 and 12 in the Hebrew).

The psalmist bemoans all the troubles he has endured in his exile and prays for salvation. He laments his remoteness from the temple of God and expresses his desire for the renewal of the divine presence. Matthew Henry speculates that David might have composed this psalm when he was prevented from returning to the sanctuary in Jerusalem, either due to persecution by Saul or because of Absalom's revolt.

Some ancient Hebrew manuscripts have this Psalm combined with Psalm 43, and C. S. Rodd argues on account of "similarities of thought and language" that these two psalms were originally one.

== Uses ==
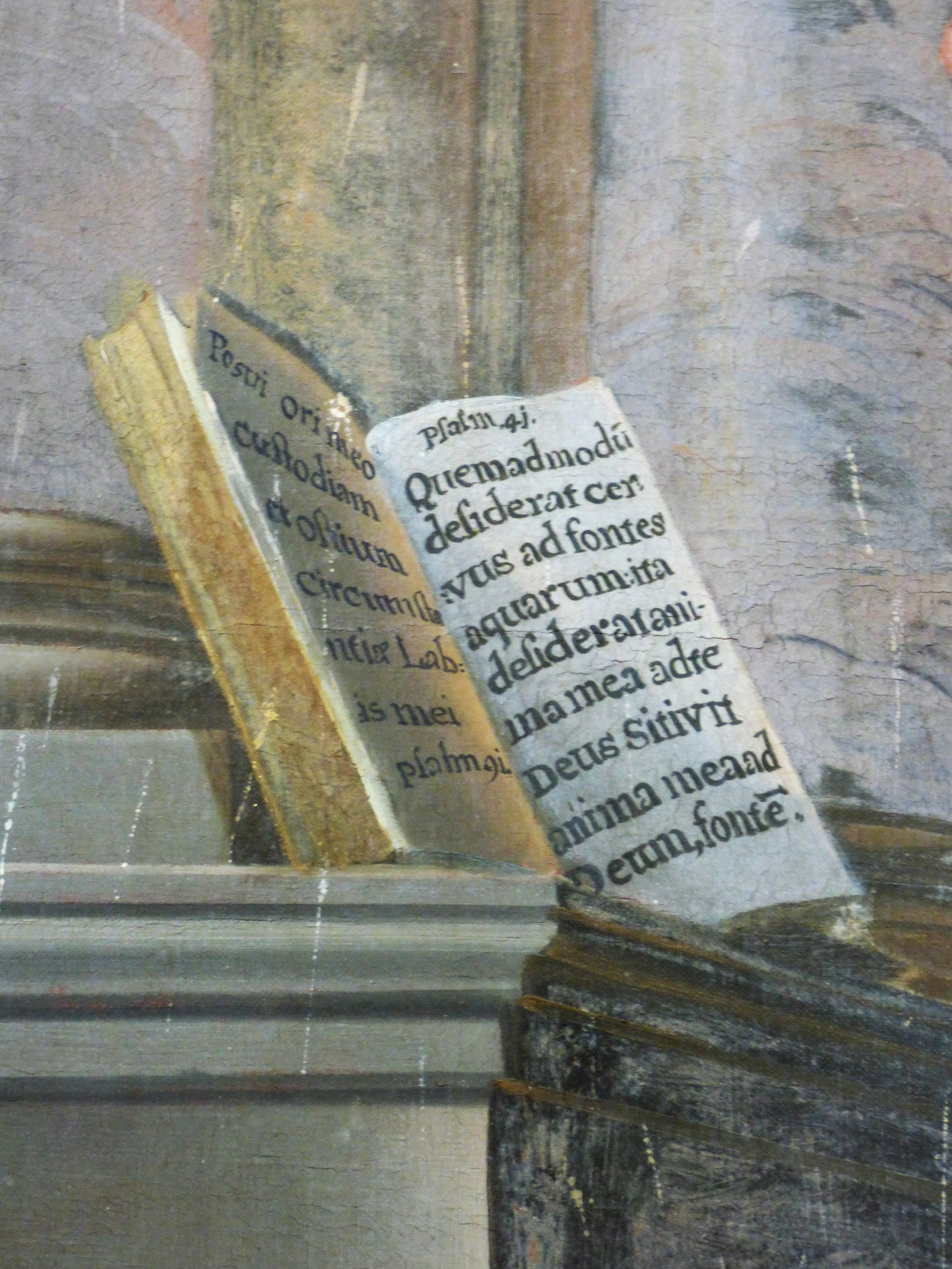
Start of Psalm 42 (Psalm 41 Vulgate) in Latin, Klösterle Innerteuchen, Gemeinde Arriach, Kärnten. (J. F. Fromiller)

=== New Testament ===
The Septuagint rendering of some words in verse 5 (Note: Verse 5 in English bible numbering, or verse 6 in Hebrew bible numbering, contains ἵνα τί περίλυπος εἶ, ἡ ψυχή, "why are you cast down, O my soul" (ESV).) shows close resemblance to the words of Jesus during the Agony in the Garden (Note: Gospels of Matthew and Mark note in Greek that Jesus says, περίλυπός ἐστιν ἡ ψυχή μου, "my soul is exceeding sorrowful" (KJV)) as recorded in Matthew 26:38 or Mark 14:34. A part of the next verse (Note: Verse 6 in English bible numbering, or verse 7 in Hebrew bible numbering, contains ἡ ψυχή μου ἐταράχθη, "my soul is cast down within me" (ESV)) in Greek also resembles what was spoken by Jesus during the same event, (Note: Gospel of John notes in Greek that Jesus says ἡ ψυχή μου τετάρακται, "my soul (is) troubled" (ESV).) according to John 12:27.

=== Judaism ===
Sephardi Jews recite Psalm 42 on the first and second nights of Sukkot prior to the evening prayer. Those who follow the custom of the Gra say Psalm 42 as the Song of the Day on the second day of Sukkot.

Verse 2 is said during Selichot.

Psalm 42 is one of the ten Psalms of the Tikkun HaKlali of Rebbe Nachman of Breslov.

This psalm is traditionally recited as a prayer for the end of the exile, and "to find favor in the eyes of others".

=== Church Fathers ===
In his discourse on this psalm, Saint Augustine of Hippo says that it corresponds to the longings of the Church.

=== Catholic Church ===
In the Rule of St. Benedict (530) this psalm was the fourth of those assigned to the second nocturn of Monday matins. In the Roman Breviary promulgated by Pope Pius V in 1568, it is the fourth in Tuesday matins. In the 1911 Reform of the Roman Breviary by Pope Pius X, it appears, divided into two parts, in Tuesday sext. In the post-Vatican II Liturgy of the Hours it is the first psalm in lauds on the Monday of the second of the four weeks over which the psalter is spread. In the Roman Missal, the responsorial psalm sung after a reading is several times composed of verses from this psalm, as at the Easter Vigil and at Masses for the Dead.

=== Book of Common Prayer ===
In the Church of England's Book of Common Prayer, the text begins "Like as a hart". The psalm is appointed to be read on the evening of the eighth day of the month.

== Musical settings ==
Musical settings of the psalm include:

=== Classical ===
- Requiem by Ockeghem (15th century)
- E'en like the hunted hind: No. 5 from Tunes for Archbishop Parker's Psalter by Thomas Tallis (1567)
- Sicut cervus by Giovanni Pierluigi da Palestrina (16th century)
- Quemadmodum desiderat cervus by Dietrich Buxtehude (17th century)
- Loys Bourgeois used the tune for this psalm as a basis for the chorale tune 'Freu dich sehr o meine Seele'.
- Heinrich Schütz wrote a setting of a paraphrase in German, "Gleich wie ein Hirsch eilt mit Begier", SWV 139, for the Becker Psalter, published first in 1628.
- In the 17th century, Michel Richard Delalande used it for a grand motet.
- Marc-Antoine Charpentier set in 1679–1680, Quemadmodum desiderat servus H.174, for 3 voices, 2 treble instruments and continuo.
- Henry Desmarest set around 1700 un Grand Motet Quemadmodum desiderat servus.
- As pants the hart by Handel (18th century)
- Chorale Was betrübst du dich, movement 6 of Ich hatte viel Bekümmernis, BWV 21, by Johann Sebastian Bach (18th century)
- Psalm 42 by Mendelssohn (19th century)
- 2e verset du 41me psaume (2e vt du 42e de la Vulgate) by Charles-Valentin Alkan (19th century)
- Like as the hart by Herbert Howells (20th century)
- As the Hart Panteth (Psalm 42) (1962, 1965; SATB 3' 20"), by Gloria Merle Huffman (1946–) (20th century)
- Sicut Cervus, 3-part a cappella piece by Laura Kranz
- Quemadmodum, a 6-part motet by John Taverner
- "Like as the hart", setting the first seven verses from the Book of Common Prayer for choir a cappella, written by Judith Weir for the state funeral of Elizabeth II on 19 September 2022

=== Jewish ===
K'ayal ta'arog (As the hart pants, verses 2–3) is a popular Jewish song. An early Hasidic nigun was composed by the first Lubavitcher Rebbe, Rabbi Shneur Zalman of Liadi. The third Lubavitcher Rebbe, Rabbi Menachem Mendel Schneersohn (the Tzemach Tzedek) also composed a melody for it.

=== Popular ===
- Psalm 42 by The Trees Community (1975)
- Psalm 42 (There is a longing in my heart) (1988; New International Version), by Maranatha! Singers (USA)
- Psalm 42 (As the deer pants for streams of water) (2008; New International Version), by Sons of Korah
- Psalm 42 by Tori Kelly
- As The Deer by Martin J. Nystrom (1984)

== Text ==
The following table shows the Hebrew text of the Psalm with vowels, alongside the Koine Greek text in the Septuagint and the English translation from the King James Version. Note that the meaning can slightly differ between these versions, as the Septuagint and the Masoretic Text come from different textual traditions. (Note: A 1917 translation directly from Hebrew to English by the Jewish Publication Society can be found here or here, and an 1844 translation directly from the Septuagint by L. C. L. Brenton can be found here. Both translations are in the public domain.) In the Septuagint, this psalm is numbered Psalm 41.

#	Hebrew	English	Greek
(Note: In the Jewish verse numbering, the ascription of this psalm is verse 1, and the rest of the psalm begins from verse 2. However, the Christian verse numbering does not count the ascription as a separate verse.)	לַמְנַצֵּ֗חַ מַשְׂכִּ֥יל לִבְנֵי־קֹֽרַח׃	(To the chief Musician, Maschil, for the sons of Korah.)	Εἰς τὸ τέλος· εἰς σύνεσιν τοῖς υἱοῖς Κορέ. -
1	כְּאַיָּ֗ל תַּעֲרֹ֥ג עַל־אֲפִֽיקֵי־מָ֑יִם כֵּ֤ן נַפְשִׁ֨י תַעֲרֹ֖ג אֵלֶ֣יךָ אֱלֹהִֽים׃	As the hart panteth after the water brooks, so panteth my soul after thee, O God.	ΟΝ ΤΡΟΠΟΝ ἐπιποθεῖ ἡ ἔλαφος ἐπὶ τὰς πηγὰς τῶν ὑδάτων, οὕτως ἐπιποθεῖ ἡ ψυχή μου πρός σέ, ὁ Θεός.
2	צָמְאָ֬ה נַפְשִׁ֨י ׀ לֵאלֹהִים֮ לְאֵ֢ל חָ֥֫י מָתַ֥י אָב֑וֹא וְ֝אֵרָאֶ֗ה פְּנֵ֣י אֱלֹהִֽים׃	My soul thirsteth for God, for the living God: when shall I come and appear before God?	ἐδίψησεν ἡ ψυχή μου πρὸς τὸν Θεὸν τὸν ζῶντα· πότε ἥξω καὶ ὀφθήσομαι τῷ προσώπῳ τοῦ Θεοῦ;
3	הָיְתָה־לִּ֬י דִמְעָתִ֣י לֶ֭חֶם יוֹמָ֣ם וָלָ֑יְלָה בֶּאֱמֹ֥ר אֵלַ֥י כׇּל־הַ֝יּ֗וֹם אַיֵּ֥ה אֱלֹהֶֽיךָ׃	My tears have been my meat day and night, while they continually say unto me, Where is thy God?	ἐγενήθη τὰ δάκρυά μου ἐμοὶ ἄρτος ἡμέρας καὶ νυκτὸς ἐν τῷ λέγεσθαί μοι καθ᾿ ἑκάστην ἡμέραν· ποῦ ἐστιν ὁ Θεός σου;
4	אֵ֤לֶּה אֶזְכְּרָ֨ה ׀ וְאֶשְׁפְּכָ֬ה עָלַ֨י ׀ נַפְשִׁ֗י כִּ֤י אֶעֱבֹ֨ר ׀ בַּסָּךְ֮ אֶדַּדֵּ֗ם עַד־בֵּ֥ית אֱלֹ֫הִ֥ים בְּקוֹל־רִנָּ֥ה וְתוֹדָ֗ה הָמ֥וֹן חוֹגֵֽ ג׃	When I remember these things, I pour out my soul in me: for I had gone with the multitude, I went with them to the house of God, with the voice of joy and praise, with a multitude that kept holyday.	ταῦτα ἐμνήσθην καὶ ἐξέχεα ἐπ᾿ ἐμὲ τὴν ψυχήν μου, ὅτι διελεύσομαι ἐν τόπῳ σκηνῆς θαυμαστῆς ἕως τοῦ οἴκου τοῦ Θεοῦ ἐν φωνῇ ἀγαλλιάσεως καὶ ἐξομολογήσεως ἤχου ἑορτάζοντος.
5	מַה־תִּשְׁתּ֬וֹחֲחִ֨י ׀ נַפְשִׁי֮ וַתֶּהֱמִ֢י עָ֫לָ֥י הוֹחִ֣לִי לֵ֭אלֹהִים כִּי־ע֥וֹד אוֹדֶ֗נּוּ יְשׁוּע֥וֹת פָּנָֽיו׃	Why art thou cast down, O my soul? and why art thou disquieted in me? hope thou in God: for I shall yet praise him for the help of his countenance.	ἱνατί περίλυπος εἶ, ἡ ψυχή μου, καὶ ἱνατί συνταράσσεις με; ἔλπισον ἐπὶ τὸν Θεόν, ὅτι ἐξομολογήσομαι αὐτῷ· σωτήριον τοῦ προσώπου μου καὶ ὁ Θεός μου.
6	אֱלֹהַ֗י עָלַי֮ נַפְשִׁ֢י תִשְׁתּ֫וֹחָ֥ח עַל־כֵּ֗ן אֶ֭זְכׇּרְךָ מֵאֶ֣רֶץ יַרְדֵּ֑ן וְ֝חֶרְמוֹנִ֗ים מֵהַ֥ר מִצְעָֽר׃	O my God, my soul is cast down within me: therefore will I remember thee from the land of Jordan, and of the Hermonites, from the hill Mizar.	πρὸς ἐμαυτὸν ἡ ψυχή μου ἐταράχθη· διὰ τοῦτο μνησθήσομαί σου ἐκ γῆς ᾿Ιορδάνου καὶ ᾿Ερμωνιείμ, ἀπὸ ὄρους μικροῦ.
7	תְּהוֹם־אֶל־תְּה֣וֹם ק֭וֹרֵא לְק֣וֹל צִנּוֹרֶ֑יךָ כׇּֽל־מִשְׁבָּרֶ֥יךָ וְ֝גַלֶּ֗יךָ עָלַ֥י עָבָֽרוּ׃	Deep calleth unto deep at the noise of thy waterspouts: all thy waves and thy billows are gone over me.	ἄβυσσος ἄβυσσον ἐπικαλεῖται εἰς φωνὴν τῶν καταῤῥακτῶν σου, πάντες οἱ μετεωρισμοί σου καὶ τὰ κύματά σου ἐπ᾿ ἐμὲ διῆλθον.
8	יוֹמָ֤ם ׀ יְצַוֶּ֬ה יְהֹוָ֨ה ׀ חַסְדּ֗וֹ וּ֭בַלַּיְלָה שִׁירֹ֣ה עִמִּ֑י תְּ֝פִלָּ֗ה לְאֵ֣ל חַיָּֽי׃	Yet the LORD will command his lovingkindness in the daytime, and in the night his song shall be with me, and my prayer unto the God of my life.	ἡμέρας ἐντελεῖται Κύριος τὸ ἔλεος αὐτοῦ, καὶ νυκτὸς ᾠδὴ αὐτῷ παρ᾿ ἐμοί, προσευχὴ τῷ Θεῷ τῆς ζωῆς μου.
9	אוֹמְרָ֤ה ׀ לְאֵ֥ל סַלְעִי֮ לָמָ֢ה שְׁכַ֫חְתָּ֥נִי לָֽמָּה־קֹדֵ֥ר אֵלֵ֗ךְ בְּלַ֣חַץ אוֹיֵֽב׃	I will say unto God my rock, Why hast thou forgotten me? why go I mourning because of the oppression of the enemy?	ἐρῶ τῷ Θεῷ· ἀντιλήπτωρ μου εἶ· διατί μου ἐπελάθου; καὶ ἱνατί σκυθρωπάζων πορεύομαι ἐν τῷ ἐκθλίβειν τὸν ἐχθρόν μου;
10	בְּרֶ֤צַח ׀ בְּֽעַצְמוֹתַ֗י חֵרְפ֥וּנִי צוֹרְרָ֑י בְּאׇמְרָ֥ם אֵלַ֥י כׇּל־הַ֝יּ֗וֹם אַיֵּ֥ה אֱלֹהֶֽיךָ׃	As with a sword in my bones, mine enemies reproach me; while they say daily unto me, Where is thy God?	ἐν τῷ καταθλᾶσθαι τὰ ὀστᾶ μου ὠνείδιζόν με οἱ ἐχθροί μου, ἐν τῷ λέγειν αὐτούς μοι καθ᾿ ἑκάστην ἡμέραν· Ποῦ ἐστιν ὁ Θεός σου;
11	מַה־תִּשְׁתּ֬וֹחֲחִ֨י ׀ נַפְשִׁי֮ וּֽמַה־תֶּהֱמִ֢י עָ֫לָ֥י הוֹחִ֣ילִי לֵ֭אלֹהִים כִּי־ע֣וֹד אוֹדֶ֑נּוּ יְשׁוּעֹ֥ת פָּ֝נַ֗י וֵאלֹהָֽי׃	Why art thou cast down, O my soul? and why art thou disquieted within me? hope thou in God: for I shall yet praise him, who is the health of my countenance, and my God.	ἱνατί περίλυπος εἶ, ἡ ψυχή μου; καὶ ἱνατί συνταράσσεις με; ἔλπισον ἐπὶ τὸν Θεόν, ὅτι ἐξομολογήσομαι αὐτῷ· σωτήριον τοῦ προσώπου μου καὶ ὁ Θεός μου.

The interpretation of the psalm's opening has been disputed for centuries. Jonathan Nathan argues that the traditional translation ("As the hart panteth after the water brooks") is based on an ancient but unsupported guess about the meaning of the rare Hebrew word תַּעֲרֹג. A better interpretation might be: "As you [God] turn a deer towards streams of water, so do you turn my soul towards yourself".
