= Psalm 42 (Mendelssohn) =

Cantata by Felix Mendelssohn

Psalm 42 Wie der Hirsch schreit
- Cantata by Felix Mendelssohn
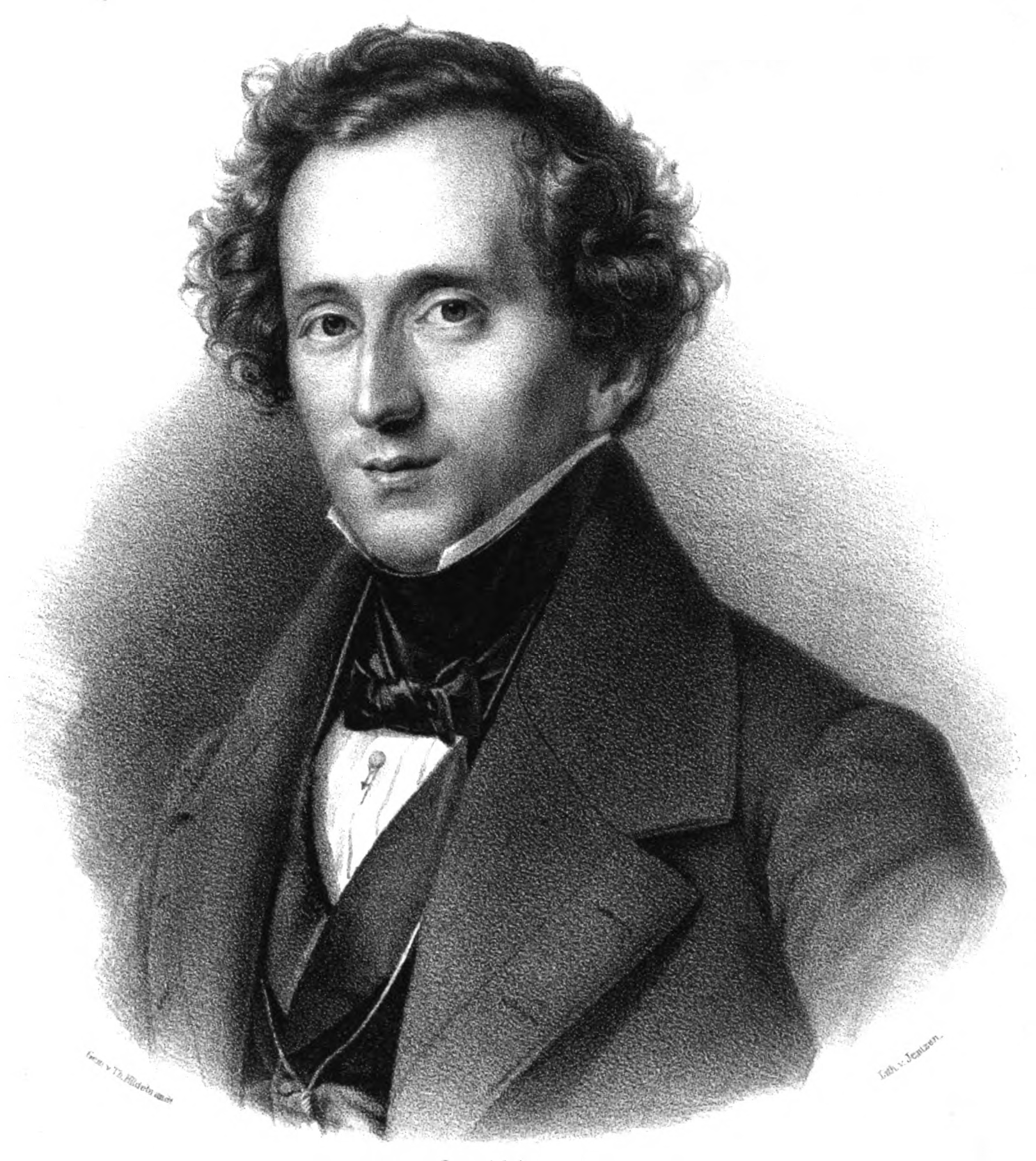
- The composer in 1837
- Catalogue: MWV A 15
- Opus: 42
- Text: Psalm 42
- Language: German
- Composed: 1837
- Published: 1837
- Scoring: STTBB soloists; SATB choir; orchestra; organ

Psalm 42, Op. 42 (MWV A 15) Wie der Hirsch schreit (As pants the hart) is a cantata by Felix Mendelssohn, setting Psalm 42 in German. It was written and published in 1837 (revised 1838) for soloists, mixed choir, orchestra and organ.

== History ==
Mendelssohn set the music to Luther's German translation of Psalm 42. At the work's first performance, in Leipzig on 1 January 1838, Mendelssohn conducted the Leipzig Gewandhaus Orchestra, with Clara Novello as soprano. He was the orchestra's musical director from 1835 until his death in 1847.

Schumann opined in 1837 that Mendelssohn's setting of Psalm 42 was the "highest point that he [Mendelssohn] reached as a composer for the church. Indeed the highest point recent church music has reached at all." Mendelssohn himself described it as “my best sacred piece… the best thing I have composed in this manner”, a work “I hold in greater regard than most of my other compositions.”

== Structure and text ==
1. Chorus: Wie der Hirsch schreit (As the Hart Longs)
2. Aria (soprano): Meine Seele dürstet nach Gott (For my soul thirsteth for God)
3. Recitative and aria (soprano): Meine Tränen sind meine Speise (My tears have been my meat) – Denn ich wollte gern hingehen (For I had gone forth most gladly)
4. Chorus: Was betrübst du dich, meine Seele (Why, my soul, art thou so vexed?)
5. Recitative (soprano): Mein Gott, betrübt ist meine Seele (My God, within me is my soul cast down)
6. Quintet (soprano with TTBB): Der Herr hat des Tages verheißen (The Lord hath commanded)
7. Final chorus: Was betrübst du dich, meine Seele (Why, my soul, art thou so vexed?)

Psalm text and English translation
German text	English translation
1. Chorus; Wie der Hirsch schreit nach frischem Wasser, so schreit meine Seele, Gott, zu Dir.	1. Chorus; As the deer longs for flowing streams, so longs my soul for you, O God.
2. Aria (Soprano); Meine Seele dürstet nach Gott, nach dem lebendigen Gotte! Wann werde ich dahin kommen, dass ich Gottes Angesicht schaue?	2. Aria (Soprano); My soul thirsts for God, for the living God. When shall I come and behold the face of God?
3. Recitative and aria (Soprano with chorus); Meine Tränen sind meine Speise Tag und Nacht, weil man täglich zu mir saget: Wo ist nun dein Gott? Wenn ich dess’ inne werde, so schütte ich mein Herz aus bei mir selbst: Denn ich wollte gern hingehen mit dem Haufen und mit ihnen wallen zum Hause Gottes, mit Frohlocken und mit Danken unter dem Haufen, die da feiern.	3. Recitative and aria; My tears have been my food day and night, while they say to me continually: “Where is your God?” When I remember these things, I pour out my soul within me: How I went with the multitude and led them in procession to the house of God, with glad shouts and songs of thanksgiving, a multitude keeping festival.
4. Chorus; Was betrübst du dich, meine Seele, und bist so unruhig in mir? Harre auf Gott! Denn ich werde ihm noch danken, dass er mir hilft mit seinem Angesicht.	4. Chorus; Why are you cast down, O my soul, and why are you in turmoil within me? Hope in God! For I shall again praise him, my help and my God.
5. Recitative (Soprano); Mein Gott, betrübt ist meine Seele in mir, darum gedenke ich an dich! Deine Fluten rauschen daher, dass hier eine Tiefe und dort eine Tiefe brause, alle deine Wasserwogen und Wellen gehn über mich.	5. Recitative (Soprano); My God, my soul is cast down within me; therefore I remember you. Deep calls to deep at the roar of your waterfalls; all your waves and your billows have gone over me.
6. Quintet (Soprano, two Tenors, two Basses); Der Herr hat des Tages verheißen seine Güte, und des Nachts singe ich zu ihm und bete zu dem Gotte meines Lebens. Mein Gott! Betrübt ist meine Seele in mir, warum hast du meiner vergessen? Warum muss ich so traurig gehn, wenn mein Feind mich drängt?	6. Quintet; By day the Lord commands his steadfast love, and at night his song is with me, a prayer to the God of my life. I say to God, my rock: “Why have you forgotten me? Why do I go mourning because of the oppression of the enemy?”
7. Final chorus; Was betrübst du dich, meine Seele, und bist so unruhig in mir? Harre auf Gott! Denn ich werde ihm noch danken, dass er meines Angesichts Hilfe und mein Gott ist. Preis sei dem Herrn, dem Gott Israels, von nun an bis in Ewigkeit!	7. Final chorus; Why are you cast down, O my soul, and why are you in turmoil within me? Hope in God! For I shall again praise him, my salvation and my God. Blessed be the Lord, the God of Israel, from now and forevermore!
