= Lenten shrouds =

Veiling of crucifixes and images during Passiontide

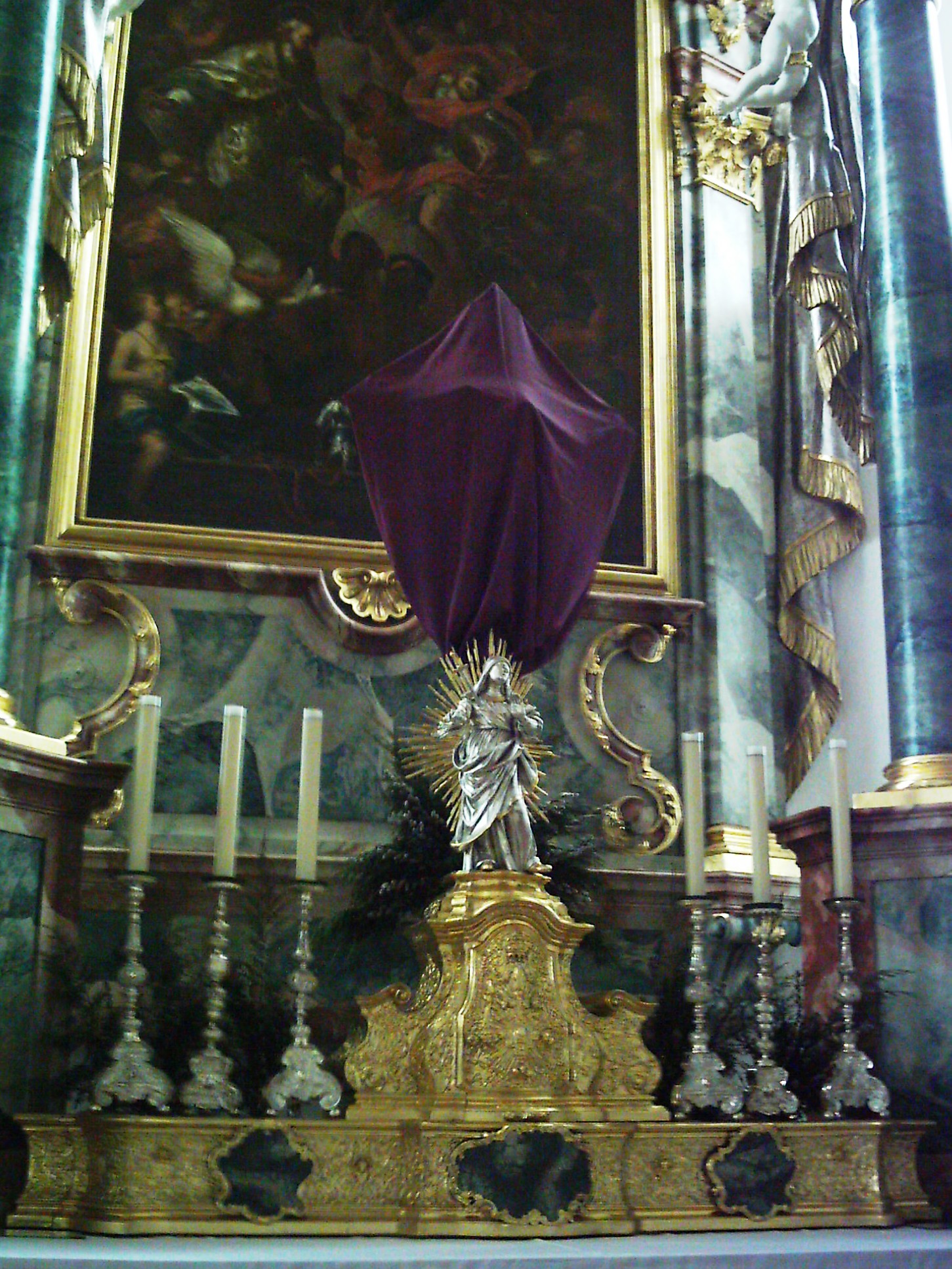
An altar cross veiled during Holy Week

Lenten shrouds are veils used to cover crucifixes, icons and some statues during Passiontide with some exceptions of those showing the suffering Christ, such as the stations of the Via Crucis or the Man of Sorrows, with purple or black cloths begins on the Saturday before the Passion Sunday. The cross is unveiled during its veneration on Good Friday while all the other Lenten shrouds are taken off during the Easter Vigil. The use of Lenten shrouds occurs in churches of the Catholic, Lutheran, and Anglican denominations.

== Significance ==
The significance of the Lenten shrouds has been explained in a variety of ways. The French liturgist Prosper Guéranger explained that "the ceremony of veiling the Crucifix, during Passiontide, expresses the humiliation, to which our Saviour subjected himself, of hiding himself when the Jews threatened to stone him, as is related in the Gospel of Passion Sunday".

"Jesus hid himself, and went out of the temple." (John 8:59)

In Gottesdienst: The Journal of Lutheran Liturgy, liturgist David Petersen likewise explains:

The veiling also reminds us of our Lord’s actions in response to the violence of the people as recorded in the Judica Gospel (St. John 8:42-59). There we read: “They picked up stones to throw at Him, but Jesus hid Himself” (v. 59 ESV).

The veiling of the statues went through a challenge in the 1960s:

"The custom of the veiling of the cross seemed to demand the devout an ever greater ingenuity by way of explanation of meaning. It was one of those traditions the exact reasons for which seem to have been lost in the swirling mists of time".

Focusing more on the psychological significance of the liturgy, modern writers explain that crucifixes, icons and statues are either covered or removed "to focus upon the coming commemoration of the Lord's passion". Covering the cross also creates "more impact" as it is unveiled during the liturgy on Good Friday, as it enhances the setting of the liturgy in Passiontide.

We "hide" His images for two weeks out of the year in a sprit of penance and mourning. An acute sadness is felt in the human heart. We long to be reunited with Him. The veil suggests the discomfort of being separated from Him. We prepare for the agony and triumph of the Easter Triduum.

== History ==
=== The Lenten veil in the Middle Ages ===
The Lenten shrouds are a very old tradition of the Catholic Church and Evangelical-Lutheran Churches, dating back to at least the 9th century. Lenten shrouds are a smaller version of the Lenten veil (Fastentuch), which is still found in Germany and Austria.

Gulielmus Durandus's Rationale divinorum officiorum, one of the most important religious writings of the Middle Ages, stipulates that all images, crucifixes, relics and tabernacles in the house of God be veiled during the period of Lent. Thus Philip the Bold, Duke of Burgundy, had gray and dark sheets (the color of ashes), attached across the sanctuary during Passiontide. At a time when crosses, reliquaries or not, were made of precious metals and encrusted with gemstones, a veil was suspended between the choir and the nave in churches so as to completely hide the sanctuary, attenuating the impact of the crosses’ brilliance when solemnly revealed on Good Friday. Although this rite was adopted both in papal liturgy at the Sessonianum and in that of the Lateran canons, it was not until 1488 that all crosses in Rome were veiled.

In the eighteenth century, large Lenten veils were still used along with the Lenten shrouds across Christianity and as far as in the missions of the Sonoran Desert in Mexico. Whereas some have suggested that the Lenten veil was replaced by the Lenten shrouds, it appears thus that both were in use at the same time and that the former, which was less practical, fell in disuse rather the latter remained.

=== Mid-twentieth to present-day ===
The Evangelical-Lutheran Churches continued the medieval practice of veiling crosses and statues with shrouds during Passiontide, which begins on Judica—the Fifth Sunday in Lent. The closing of triptychs occurs as well.

Before the Second Vatican Council, Lenten shrouds seemed to have taken over most of the interiors of Catholic churches, leading some to question whether to veil even the candlesticks. In 1969, in the wake of the Second Vatican Council, the Sacred Congregation of Rites on the revised liturgical year and General Roman Calendar suppressed Passiontide and ruled that the veiling of crosses and images was no more required except where a local episcopal conference has decided the practice was still useful, leading some to believe it was altogether “abolished” or “suppressed”. The official position of the Catholic Church has also changed more favorably towards the veiling of images. Since the 1988 Paschale Solemnitas: Circular Letter Concerning the Preparation and Celebration of the Easter Feasts of the Congregation for Divine Worship and the Discipline of the Sacraments, the Catholic Church has once again insisted that “it is fitting that any crosses in the church be covered with a red or purple veil, unless they have already been veiled on the Saturday before the fifth Sunday of Lent.” On June 14, 2001, Latin Rite members of the United States Conference of Catholic Bishops approved an adaptation to number 318 of the General Instruction of the Roman Missal which would allow for the veiling of crosses and images. In 2002, the Missale Romanum, editio typica tertia, provided a rubric at the beginning of the texts for the Fifth Sunday of Lent, which allows the practice of covering crosses and images in the Church from the fifth Sunday of Lent. Thus, the veiling of crucifixes, icons, and statues remains a relatively lasting Passiontide custom among Catholic churches, chapels, and private houses. The practise has therefore often been restored and encouraged, by clerics such as Peter J. Elliott for whom “the custom of veiling crosses and images has much to commend it in terms of religious psychology, because it helps us to concentrate on the great essentials of Christ's work of Redemption”.

Episcopalian liturgist Leonel Mitchell opined that “there is no reason to continue the medieval Roman tradition of veiling crosses for Passiontide”.

== Gallery ==
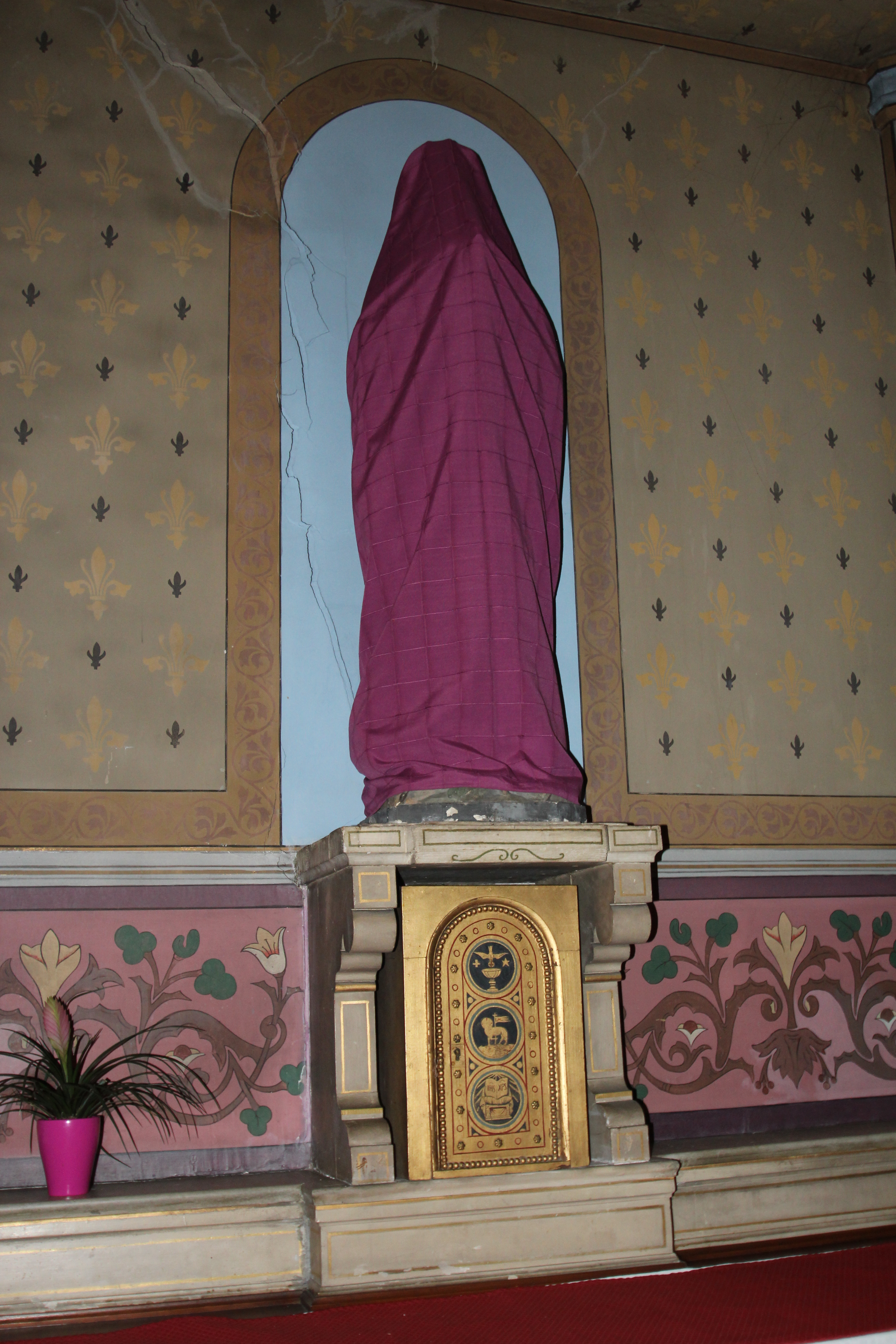
Lenten shroud on a statue

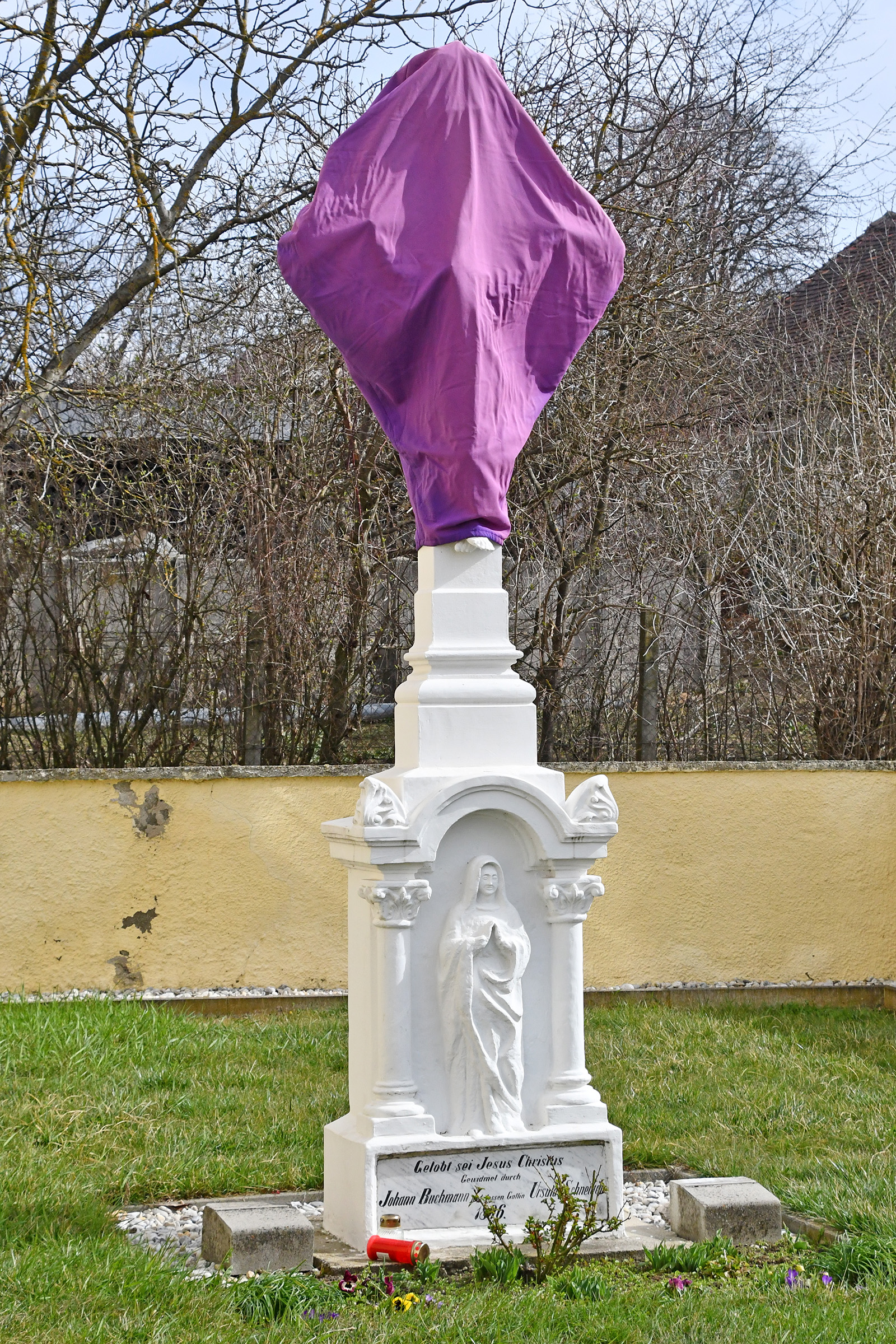
Lenten shroud on an outdoor calvary

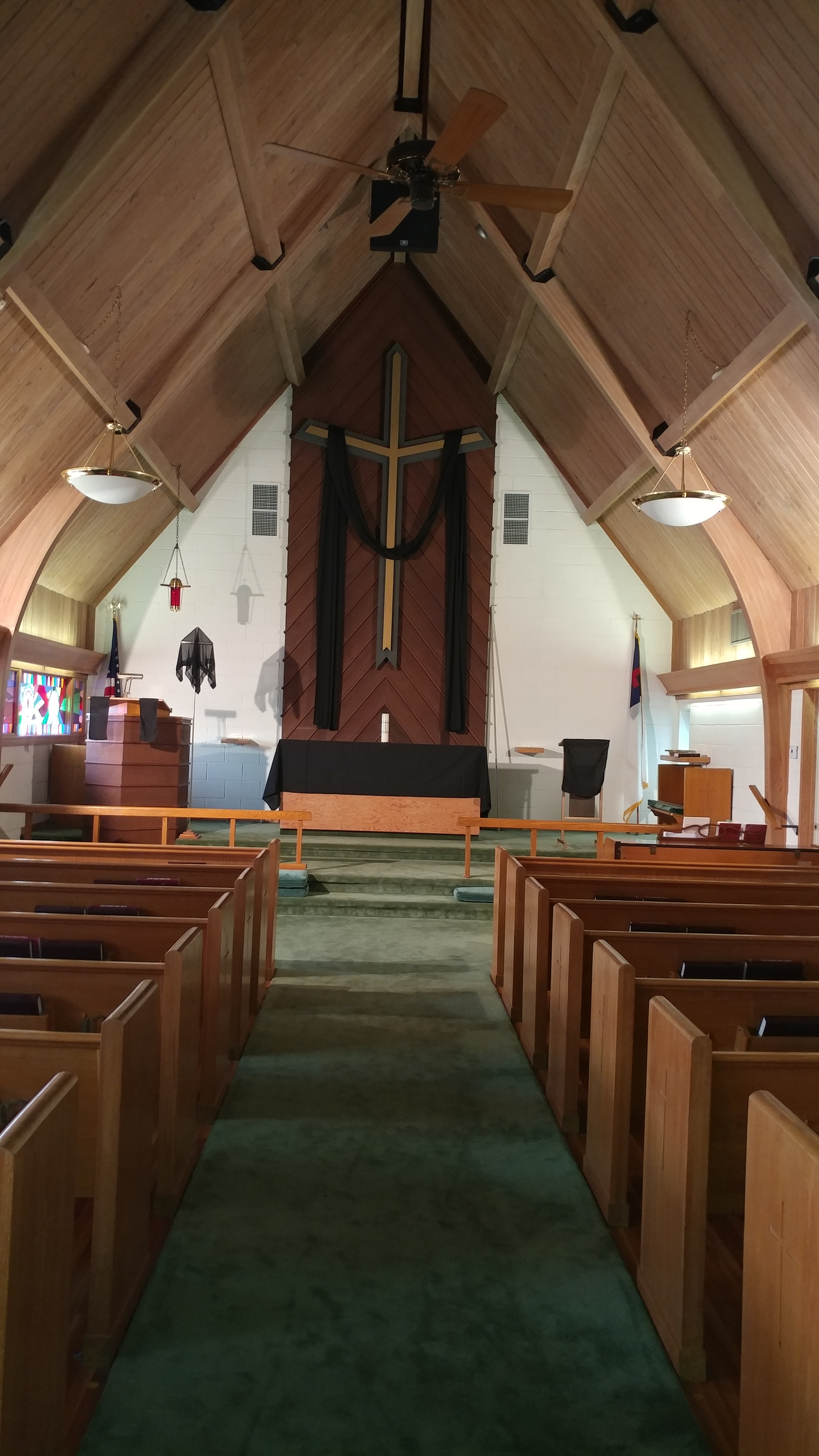
A processional cross veiled with a Lenten shroud

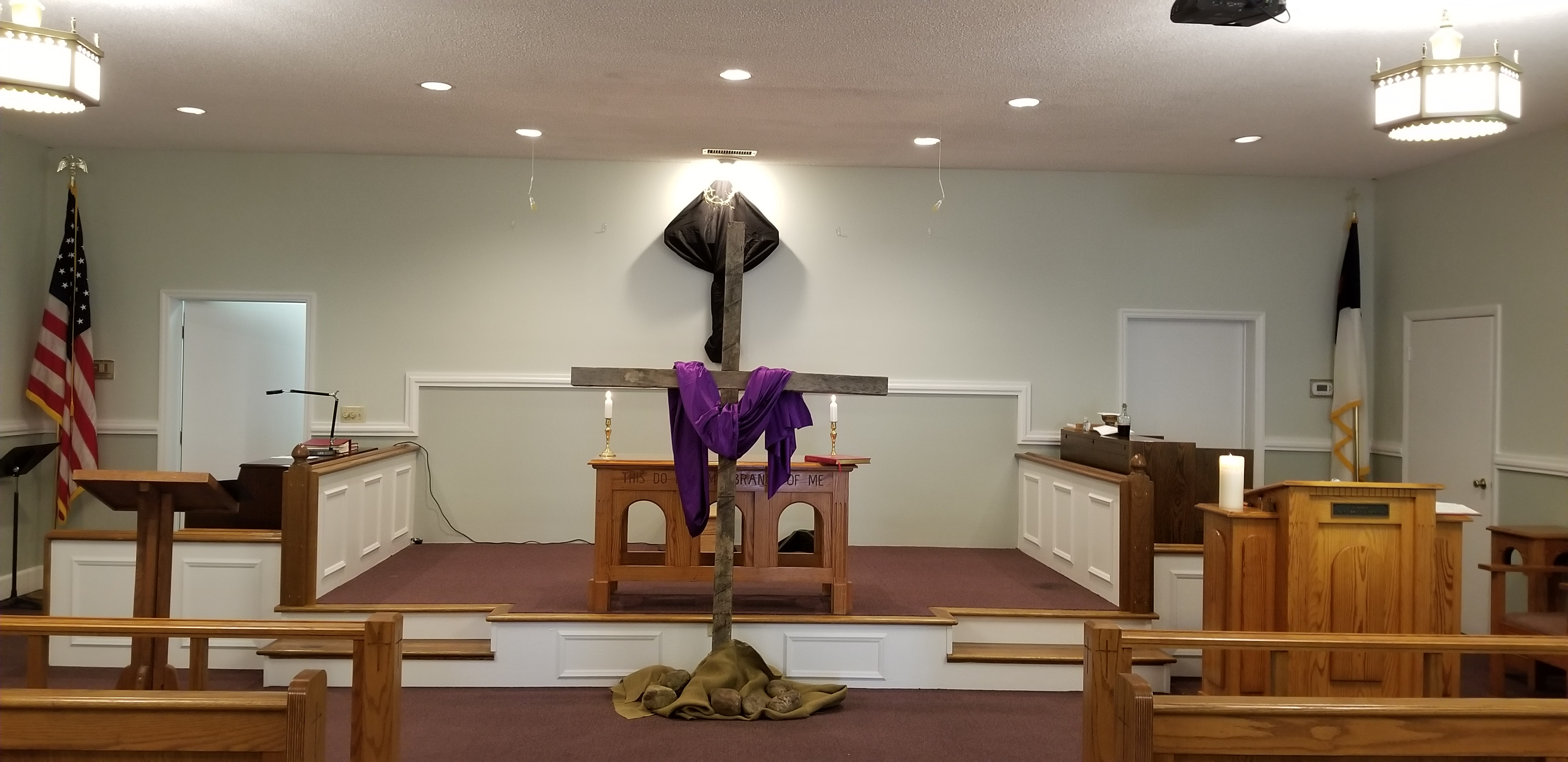
Lenten shroud on a cross in the chancel of a church
