= Tannkosh =

Large airshow and fly-in held In Germany

Coordinates: 48°00′42″N 10°06′03″E

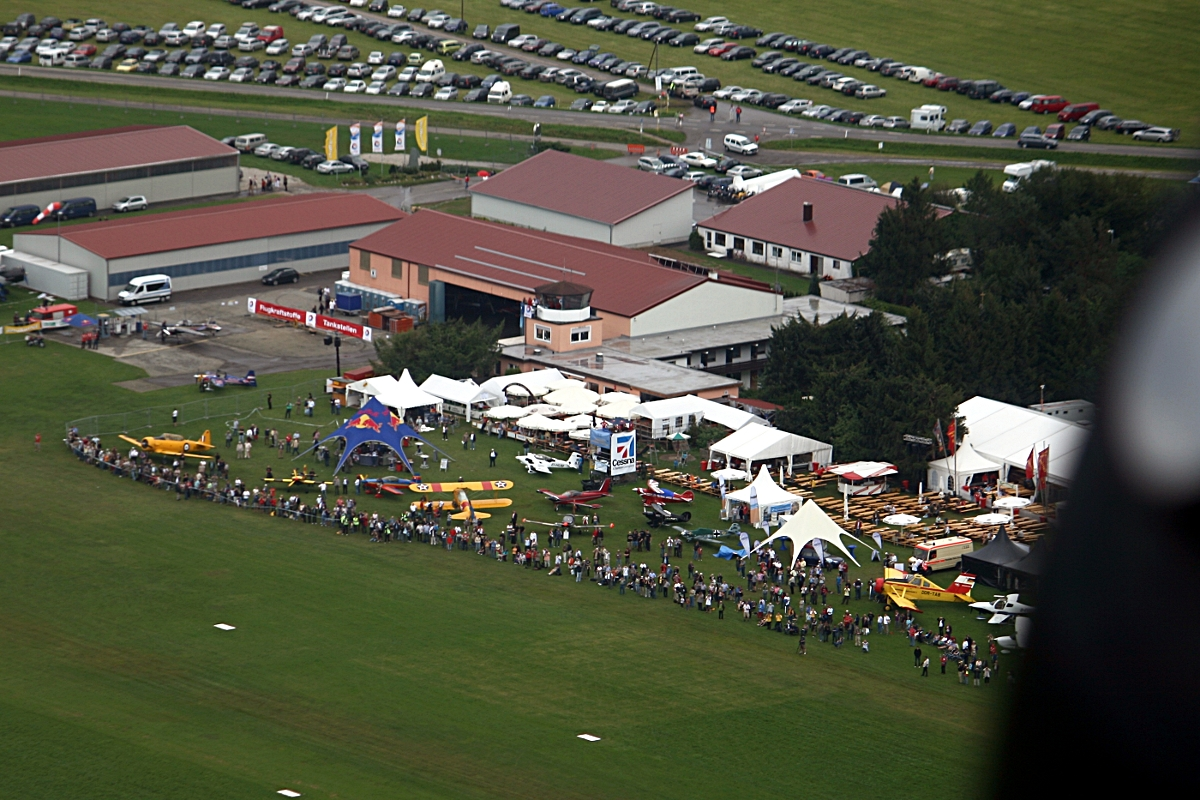
Tannkosh 2009

Tannkosh was a large airshow and fly-in held annually in July at Tannheim, upper Swabia in Germany.

The event was the closest European equivalent to EAA AirVenture Oshkosh and, although smaller than the Oshkosh airshow, Tannkosh attracted hundreds of private aircraft from all over Europe.

Tannkosh derived its name from that of the more widely known airshow upon which it was modeled, Oshkosh, and Tannheim Flugplatz, the aerodrome near Tannheim, Germany, where the event was held.

The 2013 Tannkosh airshow took place from August 23 to 25, 2013.

In October 2014, it was announced that there would be no Tannkosh 2015, nor any more to follow.
