= Sicut cervus (Palestrina) =

1604 motet by Giovanni Pierluigi da Palestrina

- Motet by Giovanni Pierluigi da Palestrina
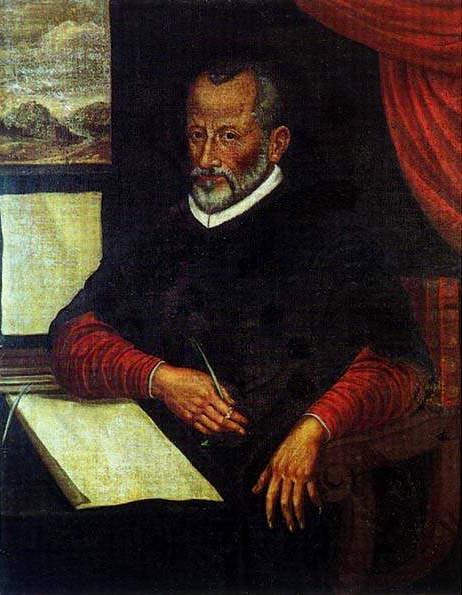
- The composer
- Text: Psalm 42:1-3
- Language: Latin
- Published: 1604: Venice
- Scoring: SATB choir

Sicut cervus is a motet for four voices by Giovanni Pierluigi da Palestrina. It sets the beginning of Psalm 42, Psalmus XLI in the Latin version of the Psalterium Romanum rather than the Vulgate Bible. The incipit is "Sicut cervus desiderat ad fontes" (As the deer desires the fountains) followed by a second part (secunda pars) "Sitivit anima mea" (My soul thirsts). It has become one of Palestrina's most popular motets, regarded as a model of Renaissance polyphony, expressing spiritual yearning.

== History ==
The motet is a setting of Psalm 42:1-3. The Psalm was a prescribed tract for the blessing of the water (font) on Holy Saturday, recalling the water of baptism as well as the "living water of the eucharist". The text, speaking of the longing for God, retained its association with funeral music, having been widely used as the Tract before the Tridentine Roman Missal of 1570 standardized the tract Absolve, Domine.

The first edition which has survived in full is a posthumously published collection of motets, Motectorum quatuor vocibus, ... which appeared in Venice in 1604. However, it appears that a lost edition of Sicut Cervus was published in Rome during the composer's lifetime.

It is now one of Palestrina's most anthologized works and regarded as a model of Renaissance polyphony.

== Music ==
External videos
- Sicut cervus
- Performance by VOCES8
- Performance by The Marian Consort

The motet is written for four voices, soprano, alto, tenor, and bass. It is set in imitative polyphony throughout, with attention to the meaning of the text in subtle word-painting. For the word "desiderat", expressing longing, the pace is faster, and the melody rises, reaching its peak on the word "fontes" (streams, water, fountains). In the continuation of the first part, "ita desiderat anima mea ad te, Deus" (Thus longs my soul for Thee, God), the human desire expressed in the first person is rendered in denser imitation and with more intense dissonance. The motet has been described as the expression of "serene but fervent spiritual yearning".

== Cultural Significance ==
Sicut Cervus remains one of Palestrina's most popular and frequently performed works and one of the rare motets that retained its popularity into the modern era. The motet has become the "unofficial anthem" of St. John's College (Annapolis/Santa Fe), where it is sung every Wednesday by students and faculty and is the part of the first-year curriculum.
