= Passiontide =

Last two weeks of Lent

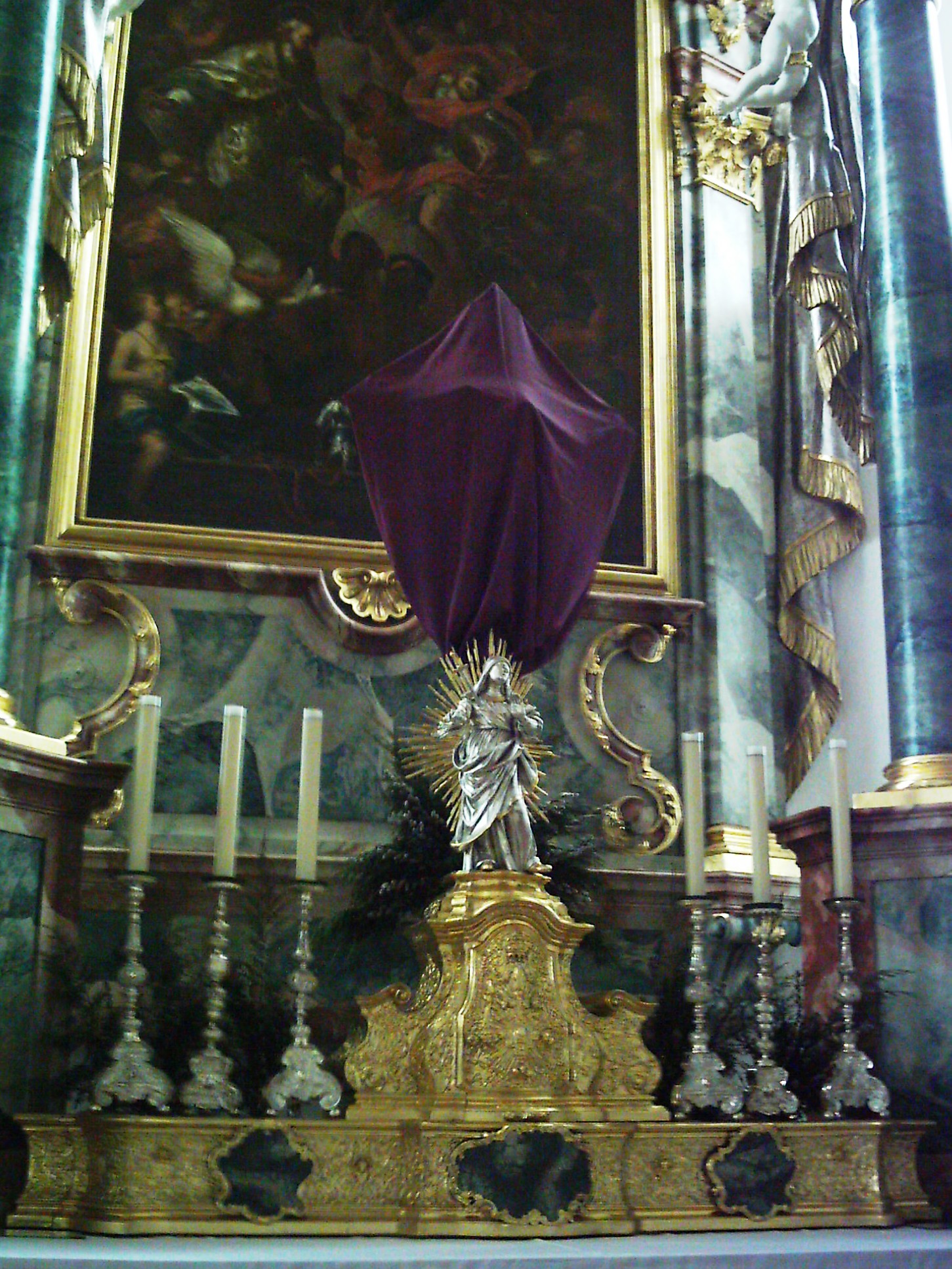
- A cross veiled during Passiontide in Lent (Pfarrkirche St. Martin in Tannheim, Baden Württemberg, Germany).
- Observed by: Anglicans; Eastern Catholics; Eastern Orthodox; Evangelical-Lutherans; Moravians; Oriental Orthodox; Roman Catholics; Methodists
- Type: Christian
- Begins: Passion Sunday
- Ends: Holy Saturday
- Date: Last two weeks of Lent
- Related to: Holy Week, Paschal Triduum

Passiontide and other named days and day ranges around Lent and Easter in Western Christianity, with the fasting days of Lent numbered

Passiontide (in the Christian liturgical year) is a name for the last two weeks of Lent, beginning on the Fifth Sunday of Lent, long celebrated as Passion Sunday, and continuing through Lazarus Saturday. It commemorates the suffering of Christ (Latin passio = “suffering”). The second week of Passiontide is Holy Week, ending on Holy Saturday.

== History ==
"Passiontide" refers to the last two weeks of Lent. According to Cyril of Scythopolis, during this time the monks of the East, who had chosen the desert for a severer mode of life, returned to their monasteries.

In certain countries, such as Brazil and Italy, it is seen as the beginning of the Holy Week observances. The Viernes de Dolores (Friday of Sorrows) is a solemn pious remembrance of the sorrowful Blessed Virgin Mary on the Friday before Palm Sunday held in the fifth week of Lent.

In the Orthodox Church, the Fifth Saturday of Great Lent is known as the Saturday of the Akathist, when the "Akathist to the Theotokos" is sung at Compline.

== Observance ==
=== Lenten shrouds ===
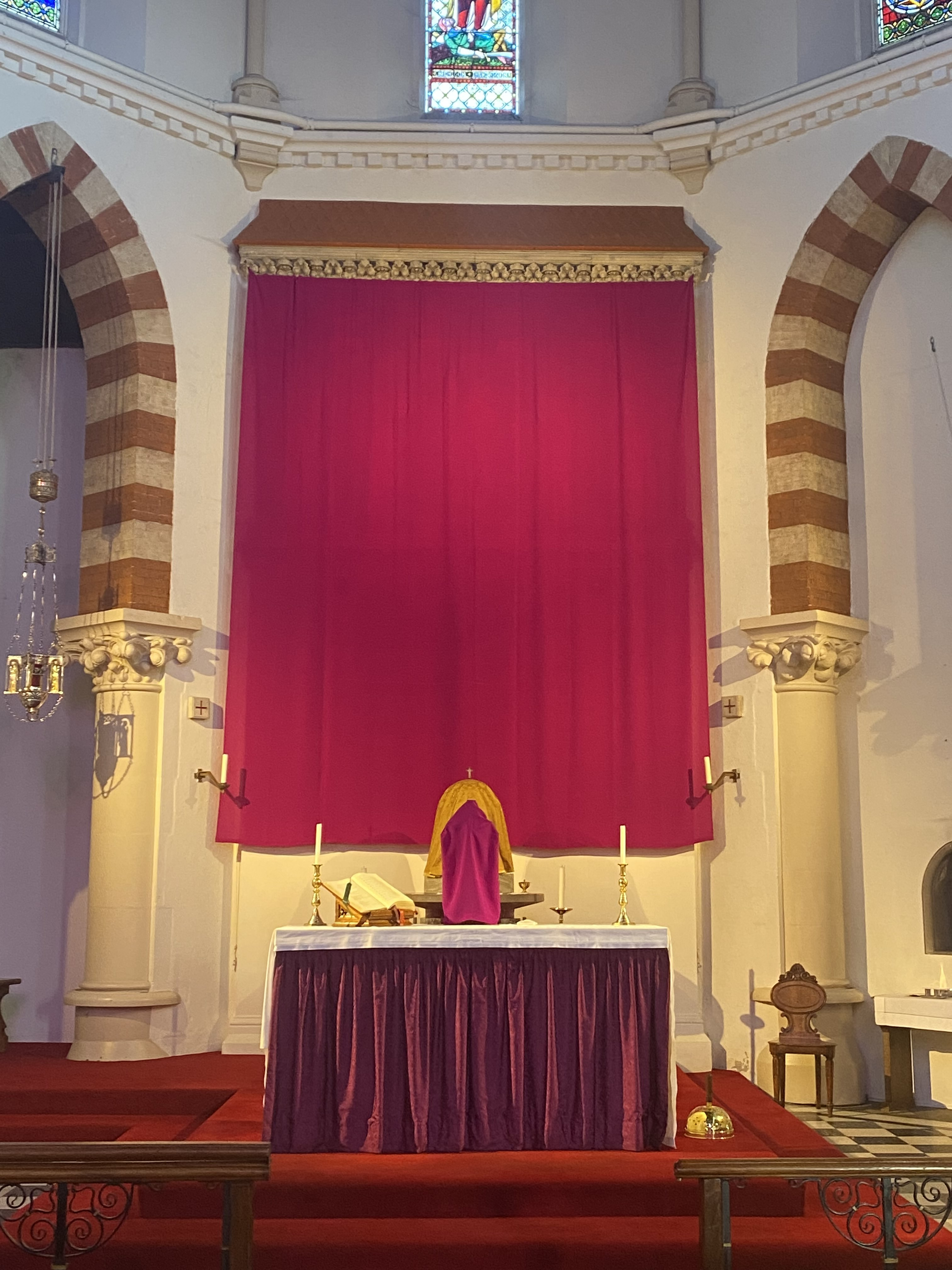
Crucifix and Reredos covered in a violet shroud for Passiontide (St Pancras Church, Ipswich)

In the Roman Catholic, Western Rite Orthodox, Evangelical-Lutheran, and Anglican branches of Christianity, all crucifixes and images may be covered in veils (usually violet, the color of vestments in Lent) starting on Passion Sunday: "The practice of covering crosses and images in the church may be observed, if the episcopal conference decides. The crosses are to be covered until the end of the celebration of the Lord's passion on Good Friday. Statues and images are to remain covered until the beginning of the Easter Vigil." (Specifically, those veils are removed during the singing of the Gloria.) The veiling was associated with Passion Sunday's Gospel (John 8:46–59), in which Jesus "hid himself" from the people.

=== Roman Catholic Church ===
==== Tridentine Passiontide ====
In the Tridentine Mass, Psalm 42 (43) is omitted at all Masses (unless a feast is observed) until Holy Thursday inclusive, as is the short doxology (Gloria Patri) at the Introit and the Psalm Lavabo at Mass. It is likewise omitted in Psalm 94 at Matins, and the responds at Matins, Prime, Terce, Sext, None, and Compline. Also, the Preface for Lent gives way to the Preface of the Holy Cross unless a festal or votive Mass is celebrated for which a proper preface is assigned.

==== The reform of Passiontide since 1955 ====
Passion Week is a name for the week beginning on Passion Sunday, as the Fifth Sunday of Lent was once called in the Roman Rite. In the 1955 Holy Week revisions, Passion Sunday was formally renamed from Dominica Passionis or Dominica de Passione ("Sunday of the Passion") to Dominica I Passionis, "First Sunday of the Passion" or "First Sunday of Passiontide". Palm Sunday, formerly Dominica in Palmis ("Sunday in Palms") became Dominica II Passionis seu in Palmis ("II Sunday of the Passion or in Palms").

Since the revision of the General Roman Calendar in 1969, the name "Passiontide" is no longer used for the last two weeks of Lent, although the former usage is somewhat preserved in the formal name for the Sunday before Easter, "Palm Sunday of the Lord's Passion". However, the Preface called that of the Passion of the Lord I (The Power of the Cross) is used in the fifth week of Lent and the Preface of the Passion of the Lord II (The Victory of the Passion) is used on Monday, Tuesday and Wednesday of Holy Week.

However, even before Pope John XXIII's Code of Rubrics (1960) changed the name of this Sunday from "Passion Sunday" (Dominica de Passione) to "First Sunday of the Passion" (Dominica I Passionis), the liturgical books gave no special name to this week, referring to the days in it simply as "Monday (etc.) after Passion Sunday", which in Pope John XXIII's edition of the Roman Missal became "Monday (etc.) after the First Sunday of the Passion".

In Pope John XXIII's revision, not only the Sunday that had previously had the exclusive name of Passion Sunday but also the following Sunday referred in their names to the Passion. The latter became the "Second Sunday of the Passion or Palm Sunday" (Dominica II Passionis seu in Palmis). The week beginning on that Sunday continued to have a distinctive name, "Holy Week" ("Hebdomada sancta") (previously, "Great Week", "Hebdomada major", but referred to in English as Holy Week), and the first days in it were called "Monday (etc.) of Holy Week", not "Monday (etc.) after the Second Sunday of the Passion or Palm Sunday".

In the 1969 revision, Passiontide ceased to be a separate liturgical season and became the Fifth Week of Lent, followed by Holy Week.

=== Evangelical-Lutheran Passiontide ===
In the Evangelical-Lutheran Churches, Passiontide begins on the 5th Sunday of Lent—Judica. During Passiontide, Lenten shrouds are placed over crucifixes and statues. The Gloria Patri is not sung during Passiontide. During Passiontide, believers engage in fasting and abstinence from meat more vigorously.

=== Anglican Passiontide ===
Passiontide is observed in many provinces of the Anglican Communion, for example in the Church of England. In the Common Worship liturgy, material proper to Passiontide is used from Evening Prayer on the Eve of the Fifth Sunday of Lent to the evening of Easter Eve. Such "proper material" includes prefaces to the Eucharistic Prayer, special orders for Morning Prayer and Evening Prayer, and seasonal material for Night Prayer and Prayer During the Day. Although the Sarum Use used crimson as the liturgical colour for the whole of Passiontide, Common Worship recommends continuing in purple (or Lenten array) throughout the fifth week of Lent, changing to red for Holy Week.

Furthermore, until the introduction of the new Harmony of the Gospel Readings for Holy Week in 1969, English-speaking members of the Moravian Church used the name "Passion Week" for Holy Week, a week much more closely associated with the Passion of Christ.

== Music for Passiontide ==
Much music has been written for Passiontide. The Gregorian chant composed for the First Sunday of Passiontide expresses two main themes: the expectation of Easter and the suffering that will be endured on Good Friday. The Introit "Iudica Me Domine" (Ps. 42 [43]), the Gradual "Eripe Me Domine" (Ps. 139), and the Tract "Saepe Expugnaverunt" (Ps. 128) all express the theme of the persecution of the just man. The Offertory on the other hand "Confitebor" (from Ps. 137 [138]) concentrates on the hope of ultimate victory and vindication. The Communion antiphon "Hoc Corpus" is taken directly from the Gospels and has a eucharist theme fittingly adapted to the liturgical moment that it accompanies, but it also calls to mind the impending Passover meal, which will serve as the setting for the Last Supper.

Passion cantatas have been composed to texts in a variety of languages, taking as their theme the hours or days before the Crucifixion of Christ. Many settings have been made of the Latin poem Stabat Mater, which describes Mary standing in front of the Cross watching her son die (the Feast of the Seven Dolours of the Blessed Virgin is observed on Friday in Passion Week), and the lessons from the Tenebrae service have been set by a variety of composers.

Several composers have set to music the seven sayings of Jesus on the cross. Heinrich Schütz composed a cantata, Die sieben Worte Jesu Christi am Kreuz, c. 1645. Joseph Haydn wrote seven string quartets, Die sieben letzten Worte unseres Erlösers am Kreuze (The seven last words of our Redeemer on the cross) which also appeared in other arrangements. The Seven Last Words from the Cross, a cantata for choir and strings was composed in 1993) by James MacMillan.

== See also ==
- Friday of Sorrows
- Lazarus Saturday
- Sorrowful Mother of Warfhuizen
