= Passion Sunday =

Fifth Sunday in Lent

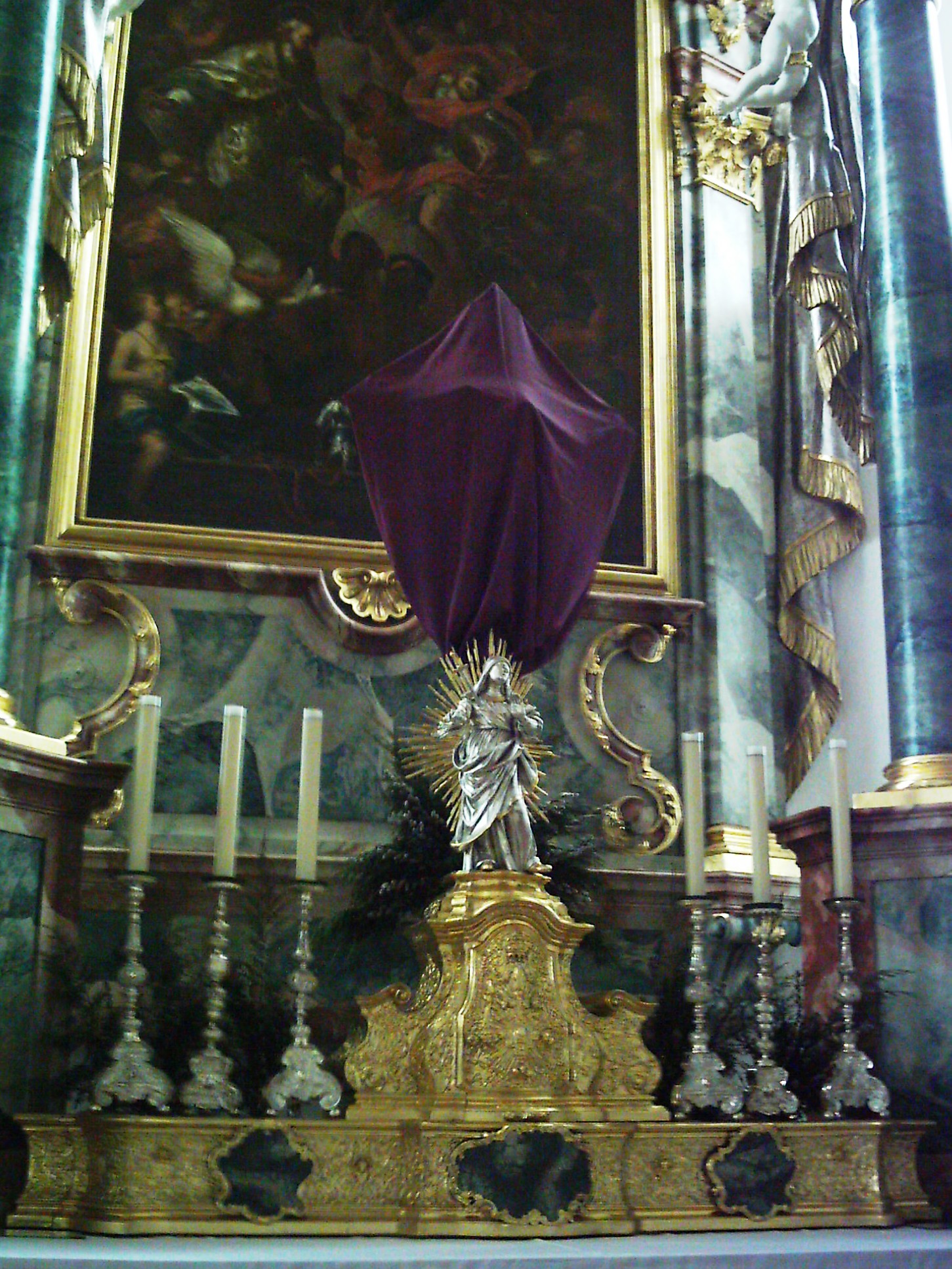
- Crucifix veiled for Passiontide in the Parish Church of St. Martin, Tannheim, Baden Württemberg, Germany .
- Also called: Care Sunday (Scotland)
- Observed by: Anglicans; Lutherans; Roman Catholics (Extraordinary Form); Methodists
- Liturgical color: Violet
- Observances: Veiling of crucifixes and images
- Date: Fifth Sunday in Lent; Second Sunday before Easter, or the Sunday following this (Roman Rite)
- 2025 date: April 6
- 2026 date: March 22
- 2027 date: March 14
- 2028 date: April 2
- Related to: Passiontide, Palm Sunday

Passion Sunday is the fifth Sunday in Lent in several Christian traditions, marking the beginning of Passiontide. In the Catholic Church, Passiontide was removed from the liturgical calendar of the Western Catholic Church for the Mass of Paul VI in 1969, but it is still observed in the Traditional Latin Mass and in the Anglican Use. Passion Sunday is observed by certain Evangelical-Lutheran Churches and among some Anglicans.

In Scotland, the day is known as Care Sunday.

== Fifth Sunday in Lent ==
Passion Sunday and other named days and day ranges around Lent and Easter in Western Christianity, with the fasting days of Lent numbered

Until 1959, the fifth Sunday in Lent was officially known in the Roman Catholic Church as “Passion Sunday”. It marked the beginning of a two-week-long period known as Passiontide, which is still observed by Catholics who attend the Traditional Latin Mass or Anglican Ordinariates, as well as Western Rite Orthodox Christians, and various denominations in Protestantism, especially in the Evangelical-Lutheran Churches and certain Anglican congregations.

In the Catholic Church, Pope John XXIII's Code of Rubrics, in 1960, changed the name of that Sunday to “First Sunday of the Passion”, bringing the name into harmony with the name that Pope Pius XII gave five years earlier to the sixth Sunday in Lent, “Second Sunday of the Passion or Palm Sunday”.Pope Paul VI in 1969 removed a distinction that existed (although with overlap) between Lent and Passiontide, which began with the fifth Sunday in Lent. The distinction, explicit in the 1960 Code of Rubrics, predates it. He deleted the reference to the Passion from the fifth Sunday in Lent. Although Passiontide as a distinct liturgical season was abolished in the Catholic Church, the Roman Rite liturgy continues to bring the Passion of Christ to mind, from Monday of the fifth week in Lent onward, through the choice of hymns, the use on the weekdays of the fifth week of Lent of Preface I of the Passion of the Lord, with Preface II of the Passion of the Lord being used on the first three weekdays of Holy Week, and the authorization of the practice of covering crosses and images from the fifth Sunday in Lent onward, if the Conference of Bishops so permits. Where this practice is followed, crucifixes remain covered until the end of the Good Friday celebration of the Lord’s Passion; statues remain covered until the Easter Vigil.

In the Catholic and Evangelical-Lutheran traditions, the entrance antiphon of the Mass on the fifth Sunday in Lent begins with the word "Iudica" (older spelling, "Judica"). This provides another name for the day: "Iudica Sunday" or "Judica Sunday", similar to the name "Laetare Sunday" for the fourth Sunday. Due to of the custom of veiling crucifixes and statues before Mass on the fifth Sunday in Lent, this Sunday was called “Black Sunday” in Germany where the veils were black, which elsewhere were generally purple.

Those who continue to observe earlier forms of the Roman Rite or of liturgies modelled on it refer to the fifth Sunday in Lent by one or other of its previous names.

=== Lutheran readings ===
The historical readings for the fifth Sunday in Lent in the Evangelical-Lutheran tradition are Genesis 12:1–3, Hebrews 9:11–15, John 8:46–59, and Psalm 43. I Corinthians 1:21–31 and Matthew 26:17–29 are alternate readings.

The three-year lectionary appoints the following readings for the fifth Sunday in Lent:

- Psalm
  - A: 116:1–9
  - B: 51:10–15
  - C: 28:1–9
- 1st Lesson
  - A: Ezekiel 37:1–14
  - B: Jeremiah 31:31–34
  - C: Isaiah 43:16–21
- 2nd Lesson
  - A: Romans 8:11–19
  - B: Hebrews 5:7–9
  - C: Philippians 3:8–14
- Gospel
  - A: John 11:47-53/1-53
  - B: John 12:20–33
  - C: Luke 20:9–19

== Sixth Sunday in Lent ==
In the Roman Rite, the Gospel reading at the Mass of the sixth Sunday in Lent is an account in one of the Synoptic Gospels of the Passion of Christ. Until 1969, the lesson was always the account from the Gospel of Matthew: the whole of chapters 26 and 27 (Matthew 26:1–27:66). In the 1955 reforms, this was trimmed to Matthew 26:36–27:60 while for priests celebrating a second or a third Mass on that day, to just Matthew 27:45–52 . Since 1970, the revised Roman Missal has been using a three-year cycle in which the accounts of Matthew (26:14–27:66 or 27:11–54), Mark (14:1–15:47 or 15:1–39) and Luke (22:14–23:56 or 23:1–49) are alternated in successive years.

Until 1954, the official name of the sixth Sunday in Lent was simply “Palm Sunday”. In 1955, the name became for 15 years the “Second Sunday of the Passion or Palm Sunday”. Since 1970, it has been “Palm Sunday of the Passion of the Lord”.

== Food ==
In the north of England and parts of Scotland, it is a tradition to eat carlin peas on this day.

Sundays of the Easter cycle
Preceded by Fourth Sunday of Lent	Fifth Sunday of Lent; March 22, 2026	Succeeded by Palm Sunday
