= The Trees Community =

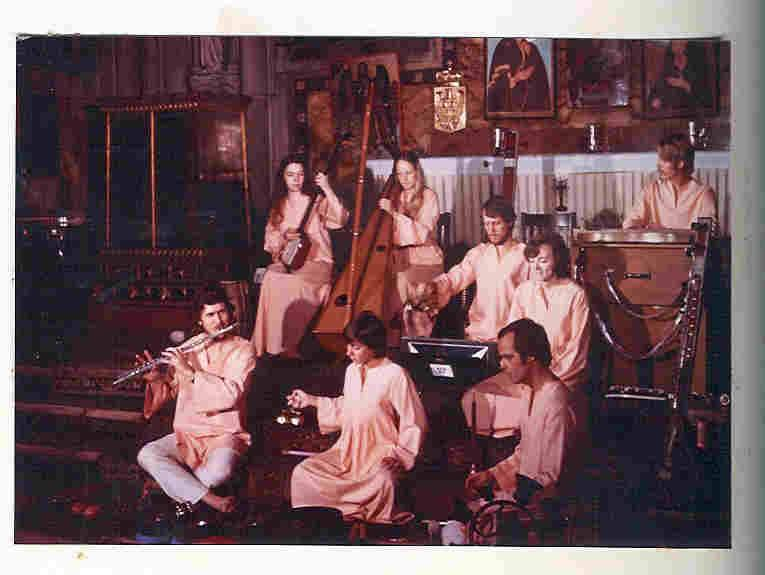
- The Trees Community in concert

Background information
- Also known as: The Trees, The Symphony of Souls
- Origin: Manhattan, New York, United States
- Genres: Christian, Folk, Experimental
- Years active: 1970–1977
- Website: thetreescommunity.com

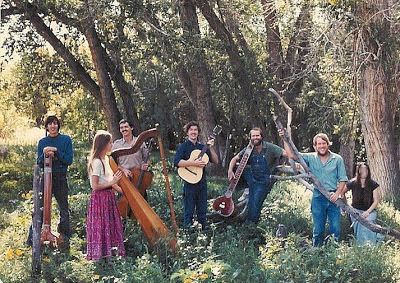
The Trees Community in Pecos, New Mexico

The Trees Community was an Episcopal Church-affiliated Christian community and a music group. They were also known simply as The Trees, and originally as "The Symphony of Souls." They were at first a disparate set of unlikely young acquaintances that bonded in a sense of common brokenness and that resulted in a wide-ranging search for truth. From this simple beginning in a loft in Manhattan in 1970, the group evolved into a community with a formal, religious order. Based at The Cathedral Church of Saint John the Divine in New York City, they were mentored by Canon Edward Nason West, sub-dean of the Cathedral, and novelist/Cathedral librarian Madeleine L'Engle Franklin. (West was her spiritual mentor, the basis of her fictional character Canon Tallis). The Trees also worked closely with James Parks Morton who was Dean of the cathedral at the time they were artists in residence there from 1973-77. Dean Morton described the community in thisTime magazine article:

Morton is pleased that at least one group of young people has chosen the cathedral as the base for one of those alternatives: a religious community. The five men and three women, ranging in age from 20 to 30, went through a virtual catalogue of religious experiences before undergoing their Christian conversions. Now known as the Trees Group, they live in an apartment near the church, regularly give concerts at the cathedral and also perform tasks like guiding cathedral visitors. This fall they will take preliminary vows of poverty, chastity and obedience.

— Time Magazine on July 16, 1973

When the wrecking ball transformed their Manhattan loft into a parking lot, the original group left New York in a converted school bus which became home for the 10 people, 2 cats, a small dog, and 80 musical instruments. They termed this initial journey (commencing in the spring of 1971) as a "pilgrimage with no destination". They made a host of contacts in Ontario and multiple US States. These included sojourns at a broad range of Christian communities ranging from farm communes (Hutterites at the Community Farm of the Brethren in Bright, Ontario) to large evangelical church communities (the Church of the Redeemer (Houston, Texas)) to Christian monasteries (the Abbey of Gethsemani in Trappist, Kentucky and Our Lady of Guadalupe in Pecos, New Mexico).

Eventually the group gained enough musical proficiency to start formally booking concerts and the pilgrimage thus turned into a set of tours to the Western United States, New England and Southeastern US regions.

Musically, the collective were known for their highly spiritual, ethereal vocals, with musical backing by a wide range of instruments from all over the world, such as sitar, tamboura, koto, Venezuelan harp, and bells. Almost all their music is original.

They released two albums in their seven-year lifespan—1973's A Portrait of Jesus Christ in Music (only 2000 copies were pressed on tapes) and 1975's The Christ Tree—though there were other recordings made of the group, notably by the monks at the Abbey of Gethsemani and composer Calvin Hampton.

In 2007, a fan of the group, Timothy Renner of Dark holler Arts, salvaged the LP master and these other recordings, digitally remastered them and produced "The Christ Tree Box Set.", of four CDs. He then produced "The Christ Tree" single CD.

Other fans of the group, Anthony Derx, and brothers Anthony and Chris Hoisington at Old Bear Records, will be re-releasing their music on vinyl and digital music services in 2019, The vinyl re-release will be a double LP from the Renner digital remasters, and will be distributed by Light in The Attic.
