= Tannheim, Biberach =

Tannheim
- Municipality
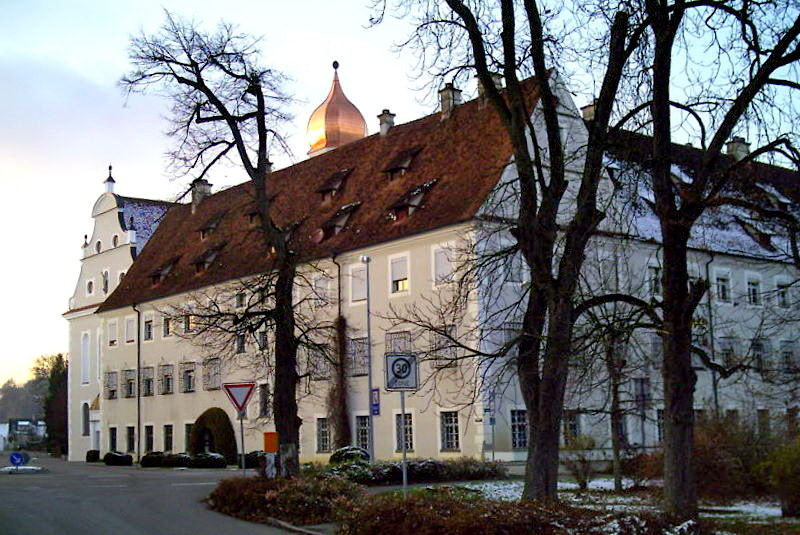
- The old castle (Ochsenhauser Pfleghof)

- Coat of arms

- Location of Tannheim within Biberach district
- Interactive map of Tannheim
- Location within Germany Location within Baden-Württemberg
- Coordinates: 48°0′N 10°5′E
- Country: Germany
- State: Baden-Württemberg
- Admin. region: Tübingen
- District: Biberach

Government
  - Mayor (2023–31): Heiko De Vita

Area
  - Total: 27.68 km^{2} (10.69 sq mi)
- Elevation: 585 m (1,919 ft)

Population (2025-12-31)
  - Total: 2,505
  - Density: 90.50/km^{2} (234.4/sq mi)
- Time zone: UTC+01:00 (CET)
  - Summer (DST): UTC+02:00 (CEST)
- Postal codes: 88459
- Dialling codes: 08395
- Vehicle registration: BC
- Website: www.gemeinde-tannheim.de

Tannheim (German pronunciation: [ˈtanhaɪm]) is a municipality in the district of Biberach, Baden-Württemberg, Germany.

== Geography ==
It is located in upper Swabia at the river Iller which forms the border to Bavaria.

== Sights ==
- Church of St. Martin, built 1700–1702

== Entertainment and culture ==
Tannheim was the home of the annual Tannkosh airshow from 1993 to 2013.

== Notable citizens ==
- Norbert Kiechle (1885–1966), former Landrat
- Richard Ferdinand Maximilian Ignatius Joseph Valentin Hubertus Maria Graf von Schaesberg-Tannheim (1884–1953), nobleman and businessman, winner of an Olympic silver medal (1912);
- Josef Dreier (born 1931), politician, former Secretary of State, Baden-Württemberg
- Matthias Dolderer (born 1970), German pilot and Red Bull Air Race Champion (2016)
- Ralph Brunner (born 1971), recipient of Paralympic medals, 2000
