= List of sonatas by Wolfgang Amadeus Mozart =

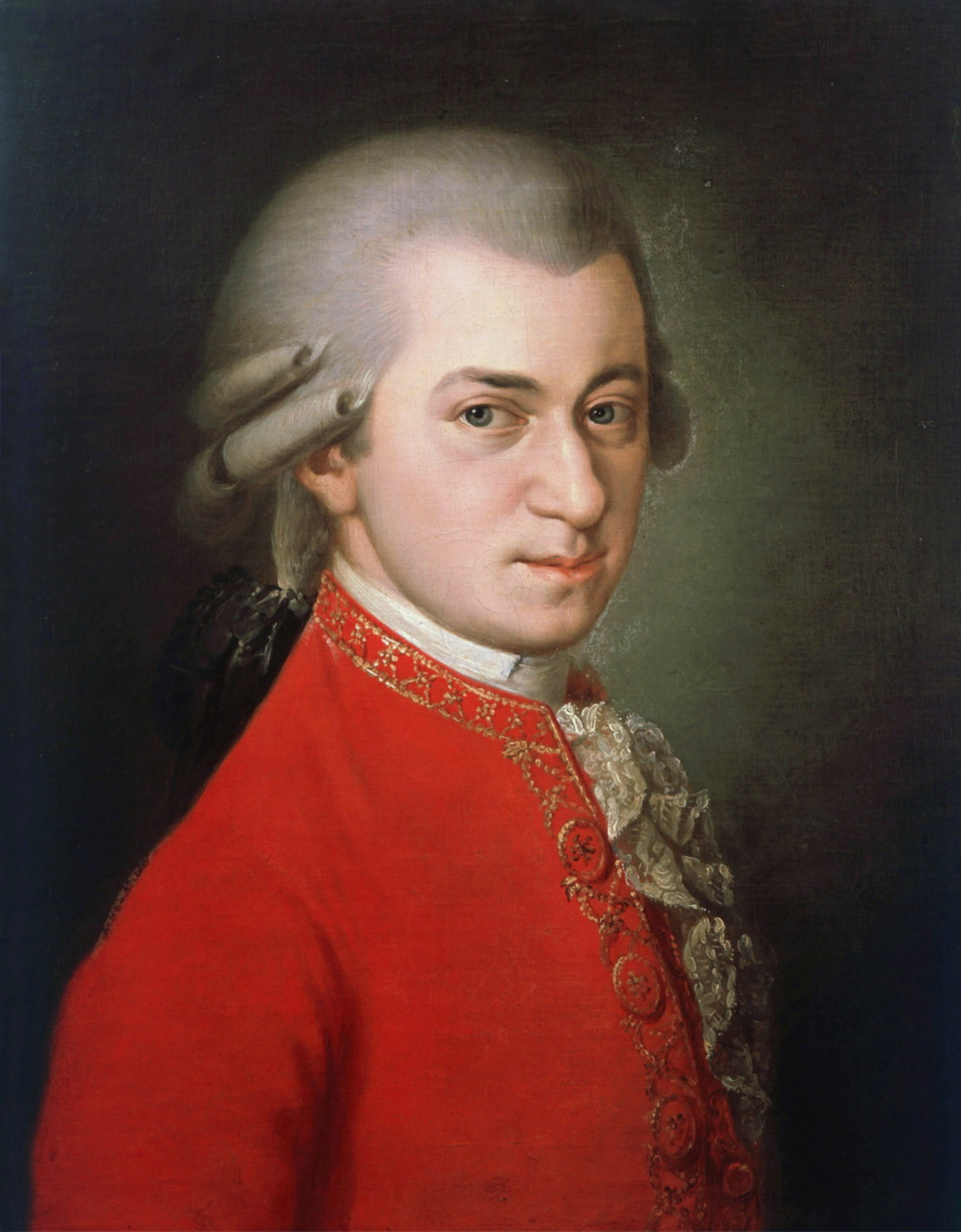
Krafft's posthumous 1819 Mozart portrait

This is a list of sonatas by Wolfgang Amadeus Mozart.

== Piano sonatas ==
=== Solo piano ===
- Piano Sonata No. 1 in C major, K. 279/189d (Munich, Autumn 1774)
- Piano Sonata No. 2 in F major, K. 280/189e (Munich, Autumn 1774)
- Piano Sonata No. 3 in B♭ major, K. 281/189f (Munich, Autumn 1774)
- Piano Sonata No. 4 in E♭ major, K. 282/189g (Munich, Autumn 1774)
- Piano Sonata No. 5 in G major, K. 283/189h (Munich, Autumn 1774)
- Piano Sonata No. 6 in D major, K. 284/205b (Munich, February–March 1775)
- Piano Sonata No. 7 in C major, K. 309/284b (Mannheim, 8 November 1777)
- Piano Sonata No. 8 in A minor, K. 310/300d (Paris, Summer 1778)
- Piano Sonata No. 9 in D major, K. 311/284c (Mannheim, November–December 1777)
- Piano Sonata No. 10 in C major, K. 330/300h (Vienna or Salzburg, 1783)
- Piano Sonata No. 11 in A major, K. 331/300i (Vienna or Salzburg, 1783)
- Piano Sonata No. 12 in F major, K. 332/300k (Vienna or Salzburg, 1783)
- Piano Sonata No. 13 in B♭ major, K. 333/315c (Linz, 1783)
- Piano Sonata No. 14 in C minor, K. 457 (Vienna, 14 October 1784)
- Piano Sonata No. 15 in F major, K. 533/494 (Vienna, 3 January 1788)
- Piano Sonata No. 16 in C major, K. 545 (so-called facile or semplice sonata; Vienna, 26 June 1788)
- Piano Sonata No. 17 in B♭ major, K. 570 (Vienna, February 1789)
- Piano Sonata No. 18 in D major, K. 576 (Vienna, July 1789)

=== Piano four-hands ===
- Sonata for keyboard four-hands in C major, K. 19d (doubtful, London, May 1765)
- Sonata for keyboard four-hands in D major, K. 381 / 123a
- Sonata for keyboard four-hands in B♭ major, K. 358 / 186c
- Sonata for Keyboard four-hands in F major, K. 497
- Sonata for keyboard four-hands in C major, K. 521
- Sonata for keyboard four-hands in G major, K. 357 (incomplete)

=== Two pianos ===
- Sonata for Two Pianos in D major, K. 448 / 375a (1781)

== Violin sonatas ==
=== Childhood violin sonatas (1762–1766) ===
- Violin Sonatas, KV 6–9 (1762–1764)
  - Sonata in C for Keyboard and Violin, K. 6 (1762–1764)
  - Sonata in D for Keyboard and Violin, K. 7 (1763–1764)
  - Sonata in B♭ for Keyboard and Violin, K. 8 (1763–1764)
  - Sonata in G for Keyboard and Violin, K. 9 (1764)
- Violin Sonatas, KV 10–15 (1764)
  - Sonata in B♭ for Keyboard, Violoncello and Violin (or Flute), K. 10 (1764)
  - Sonata in G for Keyboard, Violoncello and Violin (or Flute), K. 11 (1764)
  - Sonata in A for Keyboard, Violoncello and Violin (or Flute), K. 12 (1764)
  - Sonata in F for Keyboard, Violoncello and Violin (or Flute), K. 13 (1764)
  - Sonata in C for Keyboard, Violoncello and Violin (or Flute), K. 14 (1764)
  - Sonata in B♭ for Keyboard, Violoncello and Violin (or Flute), K. 15 (1764)
- Violin Sonatas, KV 26–31 (1766)
  - Sonata in E♭ for Keyboard and Violin, K. 26 (1766)
  - Sonata in G for Keyboard and Violin, K. 27 (1766)
  - Sonata in C for Keyboard and Violin, K. 28 (1766)
  - Sonata in D for Keyboard and Violin, K. 29 (1766)
  - Sonata in F for Keyboard and Violin, K. 30 (1766)
  - Sonata in B♭ for Keyboard and Violin, K. 31 (1766)
- Sonata in D for Keyboard and Violin, K. 630 (1766, doubtful)

=== Mature violin sonatas (1778–1788) ===
- Violin Sonata No. 17 in C major, K. 296 (1778)
- Violin Sonata No. 18 in G major, K. 301/293a (1778)
- Violin Sonata No. 19 in E♭ major, K. 302/293b (1778)
- Violin Sonata No. 20 in C major, K. 303/293c (1778)
- Violin Sonata No. 21 in E minor, K. 304/300c (1778)
- Violin Sonata No. 22 in A major, K. 305/293d (1778)
- Violin Sonata No. 23 in D major, K. 306/300l (1778)
- Violin Sonata No. 24 in F major, K. 376/374d (1781)
- Violin Sonata No. 25 in F major, K. 377/374e (1781)
- Violin Sonata No. 26 in B♭ major, K. 378/317d (1779)
- Violin Sonata No. 27 in G major, K. 379/373a (1781)
- Violin Sonata No. 28 in E♭ major, K. 380/374f (1781)
- Violin Sonata No. 29 in A major, K. 402/385e (1782, 2 movements, incomplete, completed by Maximilian Stadler)
- Violin Sonata No. 30 in C major, K. 403/385c (1782, 3 movements, incomplete, completed by Maximilian Stadler)
- Violin Sonata No. 31 in C major, K. 404/385d (1782, 2 movements, incomplete)
- Violin Sonata No. 32 in B♭ major, K. 454 (1784)
- Violin Sonata No. 33 in E♭ major, K. 481 (1785)
- Violin Sonata in B♭ major, K. 372 (1781, 1 movement: Allegro, incomplete, completed by Maximilian Stadler)
- Violin Sonata No. 35 in A major, K. 526 (1787)
- Violin Sonata No. 36 in F major, K. 547 (1788)

== Church sonatas ==
- Church Sonata No. 1 in E♭, K. 67/41h (1772)
- Church Sonata No. 2 in B♭, K. 68/41i (1772)
- Church Sonata No. 3 in D, K. 69/41k (1772)
- Church Sonata No. 4 in D, K. 144/124a (1774)
- Church Sonata No. 5 in F, K. 145/124b (1774)
- Church Sonata No. 6 in B♭, K. 212 (1775)
- Church Sonata No. 7 in F, K. 224/241a (1776)
- Church Sonata No. 8 in A, K. 225/241b (1776)
- Church Sonata No. 9 in G, K. 241 (1776)
- Church Sonata No. 10 in F, K. 244 (1776)
- Church Sonata No. 11 in D, K. 245 (1776)
- Church Sonata No. 12 in C, K. 263 (1776)
- Church Sonata No. 13 in G, K. 274/271d (1777)
- Church Sonata No. 14 in C, K. 278/271e (1777)
- Church Sonata No. 15 in C, K. 328/317c (1779)
- Church Sonata No. 16 in C, K. 329/317a (1779)
- Church Sonata No. 17 in C, K. 336/336d (1780)

== Other sonatas ==
- Sonata for Bassoon and Violoncello in B♭ major, K. 292 (1775)

== See also ==
- Köchel catalogue
- List of compositions by Wolfgang Amadeus Mozart
  - Church sonatas
  - Concert arias, songs and canons
  - Masses
  - Operas
  - Piano concertos
  - Solo piano compositions
  - Symphonies
  - Symphonies of spurious or doubtful authenticity
- The Complete Mozart Edition
