= List of solo piano compositions by Wolfgang Amadeus Mozart =

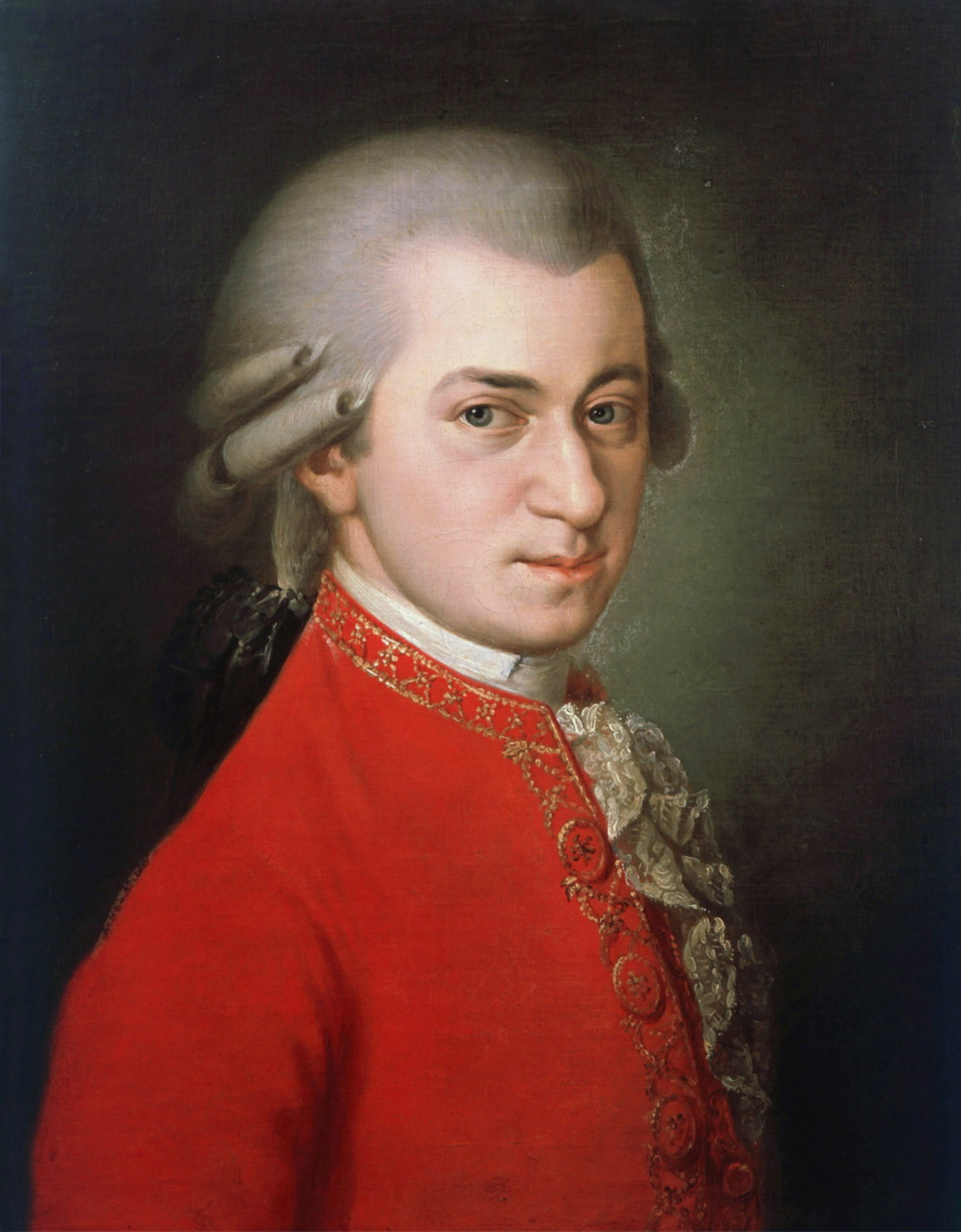
Krafft's posthumous 1819 Mozart portrait

This is a list of solo piano pieces by Wolfgang Amadeus Mozart.

== Pieces ==
=== Sonatas ===
- Piano Sonata No. 1 in C major, K. 279/189d (Munich, Autumn 1774)
- Piano Sonata No. 2 in F major, K. 280/189e (Munich, Autumn 1774)
- Piano Sonata No. 3 in B♭ major, K. 281/189f (Munich, Autumn 1774)
- Piano Sonata No. 4 in E♭ major, K. 282/189g (Munich, Autumn 1774)
- Piano Sonata No. 5 in G major, K. 283/189h (Munich, Autumn 1774)
- Piano Sonata No. 6 in D major, K. 284/205b (Munich, February–March 1775)
- Piano Sonata No. 7 in C major, K. 309/284b (Mannheim, November 8, 1777)
- Piano Sonata No. 8 in A minor, K. 310/300d (Paris, Summer 1778)
- Piano Sonata No. 9 in D major, K. 311/284c (Mannheim, November–December 1777)
- Piano Sonata No. 10 in C major, K. 330/300h (Vienna or Salzburg, 1783)
- Piano Sonata No. 11 in A major, K. 331/300i ("Turkish Rondo") (Vienna or Salzburg, 1783)
- Piano Sonata No. 12 in F major, K. 332/300k (Vienna or Salzburg, 1783)
- Piano Sonata No. 13 in B♭ major, K. 333/315c (Linz, 1783)
- Piano Sonata No. 14 in C minor, K. 457 (Vienna, October 14, 1784)
- Piano Sonata No. 15 in F major, K. 533/494 (Vienna, January 3, 1788)
- Piano Sonata No. 16 in C major, K. 545 (so-called facile or semplice sonata; Vienna, June 26, 1788)
- Piano Sonata No. 17 in B♭ major, K. 570 (Vienna, February, 1789)
- Piano Sonata No. 18 in D major, K. 576 (Vienna, July 1789)

=== Variations ===
- 8 Variations in G major on the Dutch song "Laat ons Juichen, Batavieren!" by Christian Ernst Graaf, K. 24 (The Hague, 1766)
- 7 Variations in D major on the Dutch song "Willem van Nassau", K. 25 (The Hague, 1766)
- 6 Variations in F major on the Third Movement of the Violin Sonata K. 547, K. 54/547b (Anh. 138a) (Vienna, 1788)
- 12 Variations in C major on a Menuet by Johann Christian Fischer, K. 179/189a (Salzburg, 1774)
- 6 Variations in G major on "Mio caro Adone" from the opera "La fiera di Venezia" by Antonio Salieri, K. 180/173c (Vienna, 1773)
- 9 Variations in C major on the arietta "Lison dormait" from the opera "Julie" by Nicolas Dezède, K. 264/315d (Paris, 1778)
- 12 Variations in C major on the French song "Ah, vous dirai-je, Maman", K. 265/300e (Vienna, 1781)
- 8 Variations in F major on the choir "Dieu d'amour" from the opera "Les mariages samnites" by André Grétry, K. 352/374c (Vienna, 1781)
- 12 Variations in E♭ major on the French song "La belle Françoise", K. 353/300f (Vienna, 1781)
- 12 Variations in E♭ major on the Romance "Je suis Lindor" from "Le Barbier de Seville" by Pierre Beaumarchais, music by Antoine-Laurent Baudron, K. 354/299a (Paris, 1778)
- 6 Variations in F major on the aria "Salve tu, Domine" from the opera "I filosofi immaginarii" by Giovanni Paisiello, K. 398/416e (Vienna, 1783)
- 10 Variations in G major on the aria "Unser dummer Pöbel meint" from "La rencontre imprévue" by Christoph Willibald Gluck, K. 455 (Vienna, 1784)
- 8 Variations in A major on "Come un agnello" from "Fra i due litiganti il terzo gode" by Giuseppe Sarti, K. 460/454a (doubtful) (Vienna, 1784)
- 12 Variations on an Allegretto in B♭ major, K. 500 (Vienna, 1786)
- 9 Variations in D major on a Menuet by Jean-Pierre Duport, K. 573 (Potsdam, 1789)
- 6 Variations in A major on the Final Theme of the Clarinet Quintet K. 581, K. Anh. 137 (Vienna, 1789)
- 8 Variations in F major on the song "Ein Weib ist das herrlichste Ding" from the Singspiel Der dumme Gärtner by Benedikt Schack, K. 613 (Vienna, 1791)

=== Miscellaneous pieces ===
- Nannerl Notenbuch
  - Andante in C, K. 1a (Salzburg, 1761–62)
  - Allegro in C, K. 1b (Salzburg, 1761–62)
  - Allegro in F, K. 1c (Salzburg, 1761–62)
  - Minuet in F, K. 1d (Salzburg, 1761–62)
  - Minuet in G, K. 1e (Salzburg, 1761–62)
  - Minuet in C, K. 1f (Salzburg, 1761–62)
  - Minuet in F, K. 2 (Salzburg, 1762)
  - Allegro in B♭, K. 3 (Salzburg, 1762)
  - Minuet in F, K. 4 (Salzburg, 1762)
  - Minuet in F "Triolen-Menuett", K. 5 (Salzburg, 1762)
  - Klavierstück in C, K. 5a (Salzburg, 1763)
  - Andante in B♭, K. 5b (incomplete) (Salzburg, 1763)
- The London Sketchbook, K. 15a–ss (London, 1765)
- Klavierstück in F, K. 33B or Anh.A 6 (Zurich, 30 September 1766)
- Allegro in G major, K. 72a (incomplete; doubtful) (Verona, 27 December 1769-6 January 1770)
- Minuet in D, K. 94/73h (Salzburg, 1769)
- Fugue in E♭ major, K. 153/375f (incomplete) (Vienna, 1782)
- Fugue in G minor, K. 154/385k (incomplete) (Vienna, 1782)
- Andantino in E♭ major, K. 236/588b or Anh.A 41 (Vienna, 1783; Based on the aria "Non vi turbate, no" from Act II of Alceste, Wq.44, by Gluck)
- Allegro of a Sonata in G minor, K. 312/189i/590d (incomplete; completed by an unknown hand) (Vienna, 1790)
- Minuet in D, K. 355/576b (Vienna, 1789)
- Fantasy No. 1 with Fugue in C major, K. 394/383a (Vienna, 1782)
- Capriccio in C, K. 395/300g (Paris, 1778)
- Fantasy No. 2 in C minor, K. 396/385f (incomplete; completed by Maximilian Stadler) (Vienna, 1782)
- Fantasy No. 3 in D minor, K. 397/385g (incomplete; completed by August Eberhard Müller) (Vienna, 1782)
- Suite in C (Overture, Allemande, Courante and incomplete Sarabande), K. 399/385i (Vienna, 1782)
- Allegro in B♭, K. 400/372a (incomplete; completed by Maximilian Stadler) (Vienna, 1781)
- Fugue in G minor, K. 401/375e (incomplete) (Vienna, 1782)
- Little Funeral March in C minor, K. 453a (Vienna, 1784)
- Fantasia in C minor, K. 475 (Vienna, 20 May 1785)
- Rondo No. 1 in D major, K. 485 (Vienna, 1786)
- Rondo No. 2 in F major, K. 494 (finale to K. 533 above initially published alone) (Vienna, 1786)
- Piano Sonata in B♭ major, K. 498a (spurious) (Vienna, 1786)
- Rondo in A minor, K. 511 (Vienna, 1787)
- Adagio in B minor, K. 540 (Vienna, 1788)
- Piano Sonata in F major, K. 547a (Anh. 135) (spurious) (adapted from K. 547 and K. 545) (Vienna, Summer 1788)
- Kleine Gigue in G, K. 574 (Leipzig, 1789)
- Andante in F for a Small Mechanical Organ, K. 616 (Vienna, 1791)
- Allegro in D major, K. 626b/16 or Anh.A 66 (1773, discovered in 2018)
- Adagio in B minor, K. 708 (1788)
- Adagio and Menuett in D, K. Anh.34/385h (1782)
- Andante in F major, K. Anh.138 (1805–1806; This work is a transcription of the 2nd movement of String Quartet No. 15 in D minor, K. 421/417b)

== See also ==
- List of compositions by Wolfgang Amadeus Mozart
- The Complete Mozart Edition
