= Piano Sonata No. 2 =

Piano Sonata No. 2 may refer to:

- Piano Sonata No. 2 (Beethoven)
- Piano Sonata No. 2 (Brahms)
- Piano Sonata No. 2 (Chopin)
- Piano Sonata No. 2 (Hindemith)
- Piano Sonata No. 2 (Ives)
- Piano Sonata No. 2 (Kabalevsky)
- Piano Sonata No. 2 (Mozart)
- Piano Sonata No. 2 (Prokofiev)
- Piano Sonata No. 2 (Rachmaninoff)
- Piano Sonata No. 2 (Scriabin)
- Piano Sonata No. 2 (Schumann)
- Piano Sonata No. 2 (Sessions)
- Piano Sonata No. 2 (Shostakovich)
- Piano Sonata No. 2 (Szymanowski)
- Piano Sonata No. 2 (Tchaikovsky)
- Piano Sonata No. 2 (Weber)

== See also ==
- Cello Sonata No. 2 (disambiguation)
- Violin Sonata No. 2 (disambiguation)
