= Piano sonata =

Form of music for solo piano

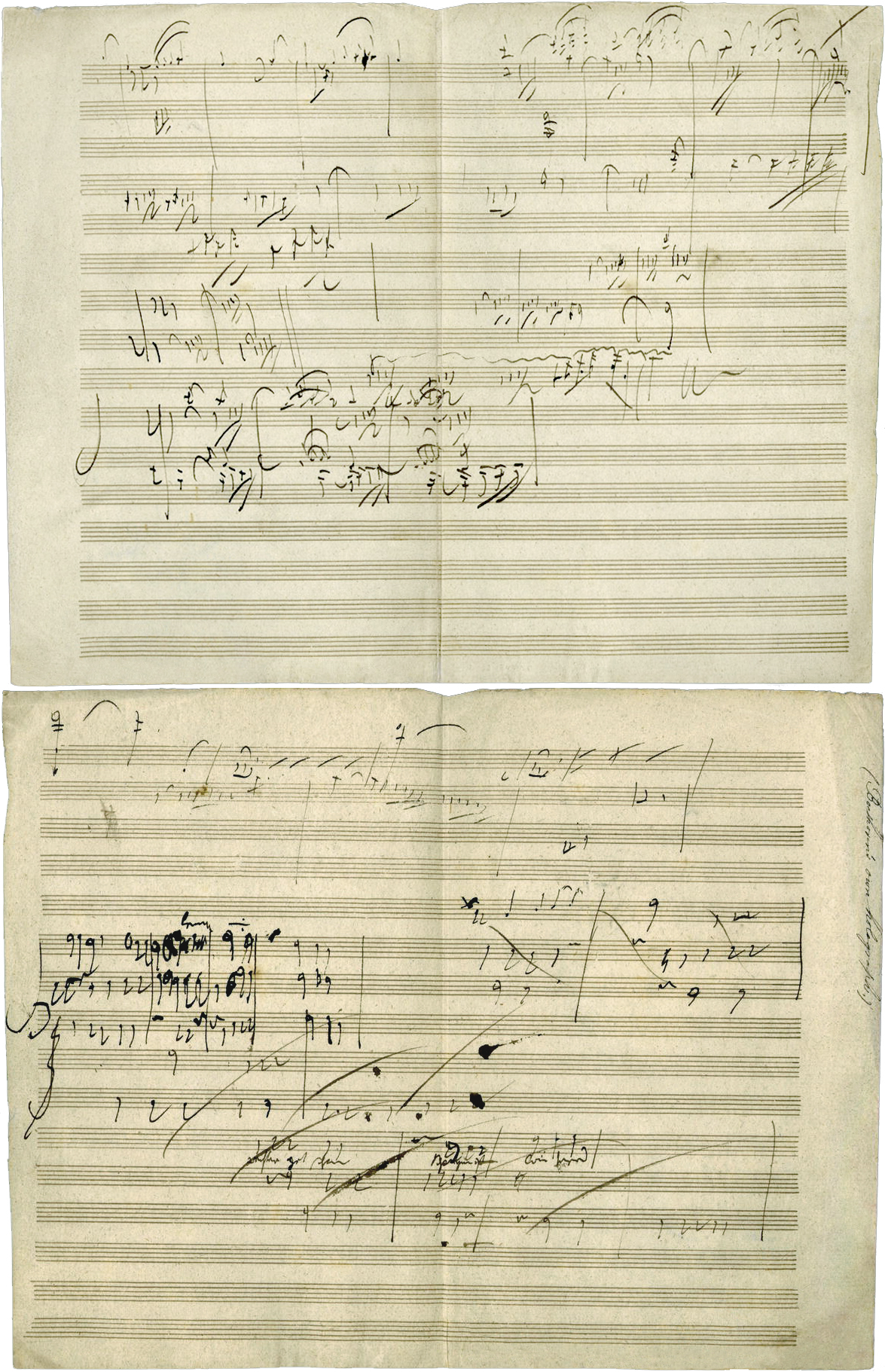
Ludwig van Beethoven's manuscript sketch for Piano Sonata No. 28, Movement IV, Geschwind, doch nicht zu sehr und mit Entschlossenheit (Allegro), in his own handwriting. The piece was completed in 1816.

A piano sonata is a sonata written for a solo piano. Piano sonatas are usually written in three or four movements, although some piano sonatas have been written with a single movement (Liszt, Scriabin, Prokofiev, Berg), others with two movements (Haydn, Beethoven), some contain five (Brahms' Third Piano Sonata, Czerny's Piano Sonata No. 1, Godowsky's Piano Sonata) or even more movements. The first movement is generally composed in sonata form.

== The Baroque keyboard sonata ==
In the Baroque era, the use of the term "sonata" generally referred to either the sonata da chiesa (church sonata) or sonata da camera (chamber sonata), both of which were sonatas for various instruments (usually one or more violins plus basso continuo). The keyboard sonata was relatively neglected by most composers.

The sonatas of Domenico Scarlatti (of which there are over 500) were the hallmark of the Baroque keyboard sonata, though they were, for the most part, unpublished during Scarlatti's lifetime. The majority of these sonatas are in one-movement binary form, both sections being in the same tempo and utilizing the same thematic material. These sonatas are prized for both their technical difficulty and their musical and formal ingenuity. The influence of Spanish folk music is evident in Scarlatti's sonatas.

Other composers of Baroque keyboard sonatas (which were primarily written in two or three movements) include Marcello, Domenico Alberti, Giustini, Durante and Platti. J.S. Bach's popular Italian Concerto, despite the name, can also be considered a keyboard sonata.

== Piano sonatas in the Classical era ==
Although various composers in the 17th century had written keyboard pieces which they entitled "Sonata", it was only in the Classical era, when the piano displaced the earlier harpsichord and sonata form rose to prominence as a principle of musical composition, that the term "piano sonata" acquired a definite meaning and a characteristic form.

All the well-known Classical era composers, especially Friedrich Kuhlau, Joseph Haydn, Muzio Clementi, Wolfgang Amadeus Mozart, and Ludwig van Beethoven, wrote many piano sonatas. Clementi wrote more than 110 piano sonatas. He is well known as "The Father of the Pianoforte". Clementi's Opus 2 was the first real piano sonata composed. The much younger Franz Schubert also wrote many. His later sonatas were inspired by the Classical forms of Haydn and Mozart and the expansion of the forms in Beethoven’s sonatas.

The 32 sonatas of Ludwig van Beethoven, including the well-known Pathétique Sonata, Piano Sonata No. 14, and Piano Sonata No. 23 are often considered the pinnacle of piano sonata composition.

== Piano sonatas in the Romantic era ==
As the Romantic era progressed after Beethoven and Schubert, piano sonatas continued to be composed, but in lesser numbers as the form took on a somewhat academic tinge and competed with shorter genres more compatible with Romantic compositional style. Franz Liszt's comprehensive "three-movements-in-one" Sonata in B minor draws on the concept of thematic transformation first introduced by Schubert in his Wanderer Fantasie of 1822. Piano sonatas have been written throughout the 19th and 20th centuries and up to the present day.

== Noted piano sonatas ==
=== Classical Era ===
Mozart's Piano Sonata No. 10 in C major
II. Andante cantabile
Performed by Johannes V. Schmidt

- Carl Philipp Emanuel Bach
  - Württemberg Sonata No. 1 in A minor, H. 30, Wq. 49/1
  - 'Prussian' Sonata No. 4 in C minor, Wq. 48/4
- Antonio Rosetti
  - Piano Sonata in F major E4
- Baldassare Galuppi
  - Piano Sonata No. 5 in C major
- Friedrich Kuhlau
  - Piano Sonata in E♭ major Op. 4
  - Piano Sonata in E♭ major Op. 127
- Johann Baptist Cramer
  - Sonata in A♭ major for piano, Op. 46 ("Die Jungfrau von Orleans")
  - Sonata in A♭ major for piano, Op. 23, No. 1 (1799)
- Ludwig van Beethoven, (See Piano sonatas (Beethoven))
  - Piano Sonata in E♭ major
  - Piano Sonata in F minor
  - Piano Sonata in D major
  - Piano Sonata No. 1 in F minor, Op. 2 No. 1
  - Piano Sonata No. 2 in A major, Op. 2 No. 2
  - Piano Sonata No. 3 in C major, Op. 2 No. 3
  - Piano Sonata No. 4 in E♭ major "Grand Sonata", Op. 7
  - Piano Sonata No. 5 in C minor, Op. 10 No. 1
  - Piano Sonata No. 6 in F major, Op. 10 No. 2
  - Piano Sonata No. 7 in D major, Op. 10 No. 3
  - Piano Sonata No. 8 in C minor "Pathétique", Op. 13
  - Piano Sonata No. 9 in E major, Op. 14 No. 1
  - Piano Sonata No. 10 in G major, Op. 14 No. 2
  - Piano Sonata No. 11 in B♭ major, Op. 22
  - Piano Sonata No. 12 in A♭ major, Op. 26
  - Piano Sonata No. 13 in E♭ major "Sonata quasi una fantasia", Op. 27 No. 1
  - Piano Sonata No. 14 in C♯ minor "Sonata quasi una fantasia" ("Moonlight"), Op. 27 No. 2
  - Piano Sonata No. 15 in D major "Pastoral", Op. 28
  - Piano Sonata No. 16 in G major, Op. 31 No. 1
  - Piano Sonata No. 17 in D minor "Tempest", Op. 31 No. 2
  - Piano Sonata No. 18 in E♭ major "The Hunt", Op. 31 No. 3
  - Piano Sonata No. 19 in G minor, Op. 49 No. 1
  - Piano Sonata No. 20 in G major, Op. 49 No. 2
  - Piano Sonata No. 21 in C major "Waldstein", Op. 53
  - Piano Sonata No. 22 in F major, Op. 54
  - Piano Sonata No. 23 in F minor "Appassionata", Op. 57
  - Piano Sonata No. 24 in F♯ major "À Thérèse", Op. 78
  - Piano Sonata No. 25 in G major "Cuckoo", Op. 79
  - Piano Sonata No. 26 in E♭ major "Les Adieux", Op. 81a
  - Piano Sonata No. 27 in E minor, Op. 90
  - Piano Sonata No. 28 in A major, Op. 101
  - Piano Sonata No. 29 in B♭ major "Hammerklavier", Op. 106
  - Piano Sonata No. 30 in E major, Op. 109
  - Piano Sonata No. 31 in A♭ major, Op. 110
  - Piano Sonata No. 32 in C minor, Op. 111
- Clementi, Muzio
  - Piano Sonata in B♭ major, Op. 24 No. 2
  - Piano Sonata in F♯ minor, Op. 25 No. 5
  - Piano Sonata in G major, Op. 40 No. 1
  - Piano Sonata in B minor, Op. 40 No. 2
  - Piano Sonata in G minor, Op. 50 No. 3
- Dussek, Jan Ladislav
  - Piano Sonata No. 18 in E♭ major, Op. 44
  - Piano Sonata No. 24 in F♯ minor "Élégie Harmonique", Op. 61
  - Piano Sonata No. 28 in F minor, "L'Invocation", Op. 77
- Haydn, Franz Joseph
  - Piano Sonata No. 33 in C minor, Hob. XVI:20
  - Piano Sonata No. 53 in E minor, Hob. XVI:34
  - Piano Sonata No. 60 in C major, Hob. XVI:50
  - Piano Sonata No. 62 in E♭ major, Hob. XVI:52
- Hummel, Johann Nepomuk
  - Piano Sonata No. 5 in F♯ minor, Op. 81
- Mozart, Wolfgang Amadeus, (See List of solo piano compositions by Wolfgang Amadeus Mozart)
  - Piano Sonata No. 1 in C major (KV. 279/189d)
  - Piano Sonata No. 2 in F major (KV. 280/189e)
  - Piano Sonata No. 3 in B♭ major (KV. 281/189f)
  - Piano Sonata No. 4 in E♭ major (KV. 282/189g)
  - Piano Sonata No. 5 in G major (KV. 283/189h)
  - Piano Sonata No. 6 in D major, “Dürnitz” (KV. 284/205b)
  - Piano Sonata No. 7 in C major (KV. 309/284b)
  - Piano Sonata No. 8 in A minor (KV. 310/300d)
  - Piano Sonata No. 9 in D major (KV. 311/284c)
  - Piano Sonata No. 10 in C major (KV. 330/300h)
  - Piano Sonata No. 11 in A major (KV. 331/300i)
  - Piano Sonata No. 12 in F major (KV. 332/300k)
  - Piano Sonata No. 13 in B♭ major "Linz Sonata" (KV. 333/315c)
  - Piano Sonata No. 14 in C minor (KV. 457)
  - Piano Sonata for four-hands in C major (KV. 521)
  - Piano Sonata No. 15 in F major (3rd Mvt: KV. 494; 1st, 2nd Mvt, & 3rd Mvt revision: KV. 533)
  - Piano Sonata No. 16 in C major (KV. 545)
  - Piano Sonata No. 17 in B♭ major (KV. 570)
  - Piano Sonata No. 18 in D major (KV. 576)
  - Piano Sonata ‘No. 19’ in F major (KV. 547a/Anh. 135)
  - Piano Sonata ‘No. 20’ in B♭ major (KV. 498a/Anh. 136)
- Maria Hester Park
  - Sonata in C major Op. 7
- Marianna Auenbrugger
  - Piano Sonata in E♭ major
- Marianna Martines
  - Piano Sonata No.3 in A major

=== Romantic ===
- Alkan, Charles-Valentin
  - Grande sonate 'Les quatre âges'
- Isaac Albéniz
  - Piano Sonata in A♭ major Op. 68 (1886)
- Victor Bendix
  - Piano Sonata in G minor, Op. 26 (published 1901)
- Vincent d'Indy
  - Piano Sonata in E major Op. 63
- Brahms, Johannes
  - Piano Sonata No. 1 in C major, Op. 1
  - Piano Sonata No. 2 in F♯ minor, Op. 2
  - Piano Sonata No. 3 in F minor, Op. 5
- Chopin, Frédéric
  - Piano Sonata No. 1 in C minor, Op. 4
  - Piano Sonata No. 2 in B♭ minor, Op. 35, "Funeral March"
  - Piano Sonata No. 3 in B minor, Op. 58
- Carl Czerny
  - Piano Sonata No. 10 in B♭ major Op. 268
- Dukas, Paul
  - Piano Sonata in E♭ minor
- Grieg, Edvard
  - Piano Sonata in E minor, Op. 7
- Hensel, Fanny
  - Ostersonate (Easter Sonata), piano sonata in A major
- Liszt, Franz
  - Après une lecture du Dante: Fantasia quasi Sonata (often erroneously referred to as the "Dante Sonata")
  - Sonata in B minor
- Joseph Woelfl
  - Piano Sonata in C minor Op. 25
  - Piano Sonata in D major Op. 58
- MacDowell, Edward
  - Sonata Tragica, Op. 45
  - Sonata Eroica, Op. 50
  - Third Sonata, Op. 57
  - Fourth Sonata, Op. 59
- Mendelssohn, Felix
  - Piano Sonata in E major, Op. 6
  - Piano Sonata in G minor, Op. 105
  - Piano Sonata in B♭ major, Op. 106
- Rachmaninoff, Sergei
  - Piano Sonata No. 1 in D minor, Op. 28
  - Piano Sonata No. 2 in B♭ minor, Op. 36
- Schubert, Franz, (See List of solo piano compositions by Franz Schubert)
  - Piano Sonata No. 1 in E major, D 157
  - Piano Sonata No. 2 in C major, D 279
  - Piano Sonata No. 3 in E major, D 459
  - Piano Sonata No. 4 in E minor, D 769A
  - Piano Sonata No. 5 in A minor, D 537
  - Piano Sonata No. 6 in A♭ major, D 557
  - Piano Sonata No. 7 in E minor, D 566
  - Piano Sonata No. 8 in D♭ major, D 568
  - Piano Sonata No. 9 in E♭ major, D 568
  - Piano Sonata No. 10 in F♯ minor, D 571
  - Piano Sonata No. 11 in B major, D 575
  - Piano Sonata No. 12 in C major, D 613
  - Piano Sonata No. 13 in F minor, D 625
  - Piano Sonata No. 14 in C♯ minor, D 655
  - Piano Sonata No. 15 in A major, D 664
  - Piano Sonata No. 16 in A minor, D 784
  - Piano Sonata No. 17 in C major, D 840
  - Piano Sonata No. 18 in A minor, D 845
  - Piano Sonata No. 19 in D major "Gasteiner", D 850
  - Piano Sonata No. 20 in G major "Fantaisie", D 894
  - Piano Sonata No. 21 in C minor, D 958
  - Piano Sonata No. 22 in A major, D 959
  - Piano Sonata No. 23 in B♭ major, D 960
- Schumann, Clara
  - Piano Sonata in G minor (1841–42)
- Schumann, Robert
  - Piano Sonata No. 1 in F♯ minor, Op. 11 "Grosse Sonate"
  - Piano Sonata No. 2 in G minor, Op. 22
  - Piano Sonata No. 3 in F minor, Op. 14 "Concerto without Orchestra"
- Julius Reubke
  - Piano Sonata (Reubke)
- Sibelius, Jean
  - Piano Sonata in F major, Op. 12
- Weber, Carl Maria von
  - Piano Sonata No. 1 in C major, Op. 24 (J. 138)
  - Piano Sonata No. 2 in A♭ major, Op. 39 (J. 199)
  - Piano Sonata No. 3 in D minor, Op. 49 (J. 206)
  - Piano Sonata No. 4 in E minor, Op. 70 (J. 287)
- Ludwig Schuncke
  - Grande Sonata in G minor Op. 3 (1832)
- Richard Strauss
  - Piano Sonata in B minor Op. 5
- Pyotr Ilyich Tchaikovsky
  - Piano Sonata in G major Op. 37
  - Piano Sonata in C♯ minor Op. 80
- Xaver Scharwenka
  - Piano Sonata No. 1 in C♯ minor, Op. 6

=== Modern (1900-present) ===
- Alwyn, William
  - Sonata alla Toccata (1945–46)
- Mily Balakirev
  - Piano Sonata Op. 102 in B♭ minor (fugato sonata)
- Barber, Samuel
  - Sonata for Piano in E♭ minor, Op. 26
- Barraqué, Jean
  - Piano Sonata (1950–52)
- Bartók, Béla
  - Piano Sonata, Sz.80
- Vasyl Barvinsky
  - Piano Sonata in D♭ major
- Bax, Arnold
  - Piano Sonata in F♯ minor No. 1 (1910)
  - Piano Sonata No. 2 (1919)
  - Piano Sonata in E♭
  - Piano Sonata No. 3 (1926)
  - Piano Sonata No. 4 in G major (1934)
- Alban Berg
  - Piano Sonata Op. 1
- Berkeley, Lennox
  - Piano Sonata in A major, Op. 20 (1941–45)
- Ernest Bloch
  - Piano Sonata B.69
- Boulez, Pierre
  - Piano Sonata No. 1
  - Piano Sonata No. 2
  - Piano Sonata No. 3 (Unfinished: only two of the five movements have been published.)
- Bridge, Frank
  - Piano Sonata, H.160
- Elliott Carter
  - Piano Sonata 1945-46
- Cochran, Julian
  - Piano Sonata No. 1
  - Piano Sonata No. 2
- Copland, Aaron
  - Piano Sonata
- Dutilleux, Henri
  - Piano Sonata, Op. 1
- George Enescu
  - Piano Sonata No. 3
- Ulvi Cemal Erkin
  - Piano Sonata (1946)
- Fairouz, Mohammed
  - Piano Sonata No. 1 "Reflections on Exile"
  - Piano Sonata No. 2 "The Last Resistance"
- Samuil Feinberg
  - Piano Sonata No. 3 Op. 3 in G minor
- Ferguson, Howard
  - Piano Sonata in F minor, Op. 8 (1938–40)
- Ginastera, Alberto
  - Piano Sonata No. 1, Op. 22
- Alexander Glazunov
  - Piano Sonata No 1 in B♭ minor, Op 74
- Leopold Godowsky
  - Piano Sonata in E minor
- Gould, Glenn
  - Piano Sonata (1948)
- Charles Tomlinson Griffes
  - Piano Sonata A.85
- Wilhelm Grosz
  - Piano Sonata in G major Op. 21
- Ivor Gurney
  - Piano Sonata No.1 in F minor
- Roy Harris
  - Piano Sonata Op. 1
- Hindemith, Paul
  - Piano Sonata No. 1 in A major "Der Main"
  - Piano Sonata No. 2 in G major
  - Piano Sonata No. 3 in B♭ major
- Hough, Stephen
  - Sonata for piano (Broken Branches) (2010)
  - 2nd Piano Sonata (Notturno luminoso) (2012)
  - Piano Sonata III (Trinitas) (2014)
  - Piano Sonata no. 4 (Vida Breve) (2016)
- Ireland, John
  - Piano Sonata (1920)
- Ives, Charles
  - Piano Sonata No.2, Concord, Mass., 1840-60
- Janáček, Leoš
  - Piano Sonata "1.X.1905"
- Jennings, David
  - Piano Sonata, Op. 1 (1988, revised 1995 and 2009)
- Dmitry Kabalevsky
  - Piano Sonata No. 2 Op. 45
  - Piano Sonata No.3 Op. 46
- Vasily Kalafati
  - Piano Sonata Op. 4 no.2 in D minor
- Nikolai Kapustin
  - Piano Sonata No. 1 "Sonata-Fantasy" (1984)
- Viktor Kosenko
  - Piano Sonata in B♭ minor Op. 13
- Leighton, Kenneth
  - Piano Sonata No. 1, Op. 2 (1948)
  - Piano Sonata No. 2, Op. 17 (1953)
  - Piano Sonata No. 3 Op. 27 (1954)
  - Piano Sonata, Op. 64 (1971–72)
- Liebermann, Lowell
  - Piano Sonata No. 1, Op. 1 (1977)
  - Piano Sonata No.2 ("Sonata Notturna") Op. 10 (1983)
  - Piano Sonata No.3 Op. 82 (2002)
- Lilburn, Douglas
  - Piano Sonata No. 1 in C minor Op. 1 (1932)
  - Piano Sonata No. 3 in F♯ minor (1939)
  - Piano Sonata No. 4 in A minor (1939)
  - Piano Sonata No. 5 (1949)
  - Piano Sonata No. 6 (1956)
- Bohuslav Martinů
  - Piano Sonata (Martinů)
- Medtner, Nikolai
  - Piano Sonata No. 1 in F minor, Op. 5 (1901–3)
  - Piano Sonata No. 2 in A♭, Op. 11 (1904–7)
  - Piano Sonata No. 3 in D minor, Sonate-Elegie, Op. 11 (1904–7)
  - Piano Sonata No. 4 in C, Op. 11 (1904–7)
  - Piano Sonata No. 5 in G minor, Op. 22 (1909–10)
  - Piano Sonata No. 6 in C minor, Sonata-Skazka, Op. 22 (1910–11)
  - Piano Sonata No. 7 in G minor, Night Wind, Op. 25 No. 2 (1910–11)
  - Piano Sonata No. 8 in F♯, Sonata-Ballade, Op. 27 (1912–14)
  - Piano Sonata No. 9 in A minor, War Sonata, Op. 30 (1914–17)
  - Piano Sonata No. 10 in A minor, Sonata-reminiscenza, Op. 38 No. 1 (1920)
  - Piano Sonata No. 11 in C minor, Sonata Tragica, Op. 39, No. 5 (1920)
  - Piano Sonata No. 12 in B♭ minor, Romantica, Op. 53 No. 1 (1930)
  - Piano Sonata No. 13 in F minor, Minacciosa, Op. 53, No. 2 (1930)
  - Piano Sonata No. 14 in G, Sonata-Idyll, Op. 56 (1937)
- Akira Miyoshi
  - Sonata Pour Piano (1958)
- John Ogdon
  - Piano Sonata "Dedicated to my Friend Stephen Bishop"
- Ornstein, Leo
  - Piano Sonata No. 4
  - Piano Sonata No. 8
- Pejačević, Dora
  - Sonata in B♭ minor, Op. 36 (1914; dedicated to Anny von Lange)
  - Sonata in A♭ major, Op. 57 (in one movement; 1921)
- Persichetti, Vincent
  - Sonata No. 12 (Mirror Sonata)
- Price, Florence
  - Piano Sonata in E minor
- Prokofiev, Sergei
  - Piano Sonata No. 1 in F minor, Op. 1
  - Piano Sonata No. 2 in D minor, Op. 14
  - Piano Sonata No. 3 in A minor, Op. 28 ("From Old Notebooks")
  - Piano Sonata No. 4 in C minor, Op. 29
  - Piano Sonata No. 5 in C major, Op. 38
  - Piano Sonata No. 6 in A major, Op. 82 ("War Sonata 1")
  - Piano Sonata No. 7 in B♭ major, Op. 83 ("War Sonata 2/Stalingrad")
  - Piano Sonata No. 8 in B♭ major, Op. 84 ("War Sonata 3")
  - Piano Sonata No. 9 in C major, Op. 103
- Sergei Protopopov
  - Piano Sonata No.3 Op. 6
- Alexander Rosenblatt
  - Piano Sonata no.2 (1988)
- Nikolai Roslavets
  - Piano Sonata No. 1 (1914) — Published by Muzyka, 1990 (edited by Eduard Babasyan)
- Alec Rowley
  - Piano Sonata No.2 in D major (1949)
- Rzewski, Frederic
  - Sonata for Solo Piano (1991)
- Schnittke, Alfred
  - Piano Sonata No. 1
  - Piano Sonata No. 2
  - Piano Sonata No. 3
- Scriabin, Alexander
  - Piano Sonata No. 1
  - Piano Sonata No. 2 "Sonata-Fantasy"
  - Piano Sonata No. 3
  - Piano Sonata No. 4
  - Piano Sonata No. 5
  - Piano Sonata No. 6
  - Piano Sonata No. 7 "White Mass"
  - Piano Sonata No. 8
  - Piano Sonata No. 9 "Black Mass"
  - Piano Sonata No. 10
- Shostakovich, Dmitri
  - Piano Sonata No. 2 in B minor, Op. 61
- Ethel Smyth
  - Piano Sonata No. 2 (Geistinger) in C♯ minor (1877)
- Kaikhosru Shapurji Sorabji
  - Piano Sonata No. 1, KSS 20
- Alexei Stanchinsky
  - Piano Sonata No. 2 in G major (1912)
- Stoker, Richard
  - Piano Sonata No.1, Op. 26 (1970)
  - Piano Sonata No.2, Op. 71 (1998)
- Stravinsky, Igor
  - Piano Sonata in F♯ minor
  - Piano Sonata (1924)
- Yevgeny Svetlanov
  - Piano Sonata No.3 (1953)
- Karol Szymanowski
  - Piano Sonata Op. 8
  - Piano Sonata No. 2 in A major Op. 21
  - Piano Sonata No. 3 Op. 36
- Tippett, Michael
  - Piano Sonata No. 1 (1936–38)
  - Piano Sonata No. 2 (1962)
  - Piano Sonata No. 3 (1972–73)
  - Piano Sonata No. 4 (1983–84)
- Boris Tishchenko
  - Piano Sonata No.2 Op. 17
- Vine, Carl
  - Piano Sonata No. 1
- Earl Wild
  - Piano Sonata (2000)
- Williams, John
  - Piano Sonata (1951)
- Wuorinen, Charles
  - Piano Sonata (1969)
  - Second Piano Sonata (1976)
  - Third Piano Sonata (1986)
  - Fourth Piano Sonata (2007)
