= Piano Sonata in A minor =

Piano Sonata in A minor may refer to:

- Piano Sonata No. 8, K. 310 (Mozart)
- Piano Sonata, D 537 (Schubert)
- Piano Sonata, D 784 (Schubert)
- Piano Sonata, D 845 (Schubert)
- Piano Sonata No. 2 (Szymanowski)
- Piano Sonata No. 3 (Prokofiev)
