= Piano Sonata No. 17 =

Piano Sonata No. 17 may refer to:

- Piano Sonata No. 17 (Beethoven)
- Piano Sonata No. 17 (Mozart)
