= Piano Sonata No. 9 =

Piano Sonata No. 9 may refer to:

- Piano Sonata No. 9 (Beethoven)
- Piano Sonata No. 9 (Mozart)
- Piano Sonata No. 9 (Scriabin)
- Piano Sonata No. 9 (Prokofiev)
