= Piano Sonata No. 11 =

Piano Sonata No. 11 may refer to:

- Piano Sonata No. 11 (Beethoven)
- Piano Sonata No. 11 (Mozart)
- Piano Sonata No. 11 (Prokofiev)
