= Piano Sonata No. 13 =

Piano Sonata No. 13 may refer to:

- Piano Sonata No. 13 (Beethoven)
- Piano Sonata No. 13 (Mozart)
