= Piano Sonata No. 14 =

Piano Sonata No. 14 may refer to:

- Piano Sonata No. 14 (Beethoven), commonly known as the Moonlight Sonata
- Piano Sonata No. 14 (Mozart)
