= Piano Sonata No. 4 =

Piano Sonata No. 4 may refer to:

- Piano Sonata No. 4 (Beethoven)
- Piano Sonata No. 4 (Mozart)
- Piano Sonata No. 4 (Prokofiev)
- Piano Sonata No. 4 (Scriabin)
