= Allegro in D major (Mozart) =

1773 piano composition by W. A. Mozart

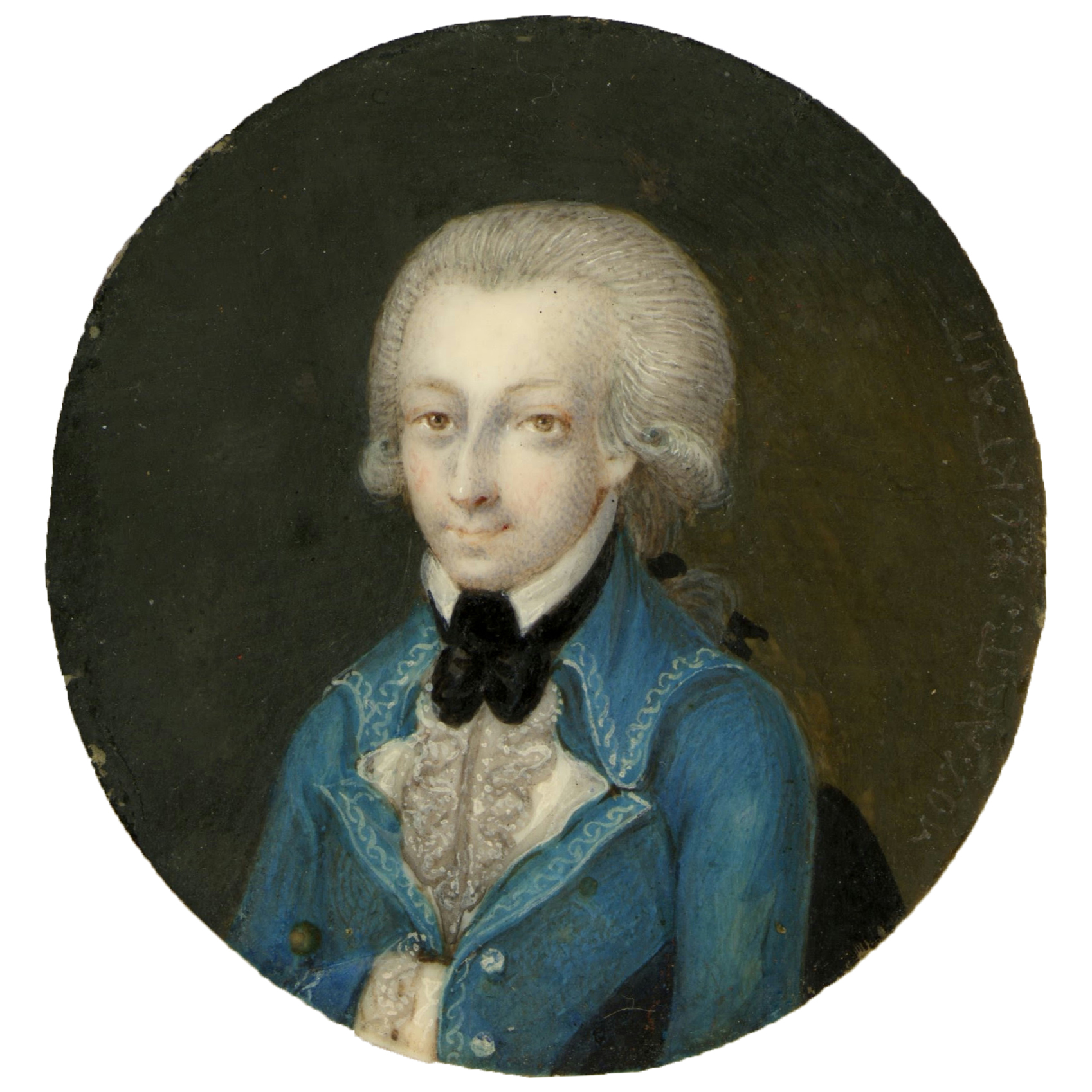
1773 miniature of Mozart

Allegro in D major, K. 626b/16 (Anh. A 66), is a composition for solo piano by Wolfgang Amadeus Mozart, speculated to have been completed in 1773. The piece is approximately 2 minutes long. It was discovered in 2018.

== Background ==
Not much is known about the context of the piece, except that it was labeled in auction catalogues from the 1900s as a "sketch for a composition for orchestra or chamber ensemble". The autograph manuscript was bought in the late 1920s by a Dutch engineer. For 90 years, the owner's family held the manuscript in their possession before offering it to the International Mozarteum Foundation, who accepted the offer. The manuscript was confirmed to be written by Mozart through examination of the paper, ink and handwriting.

=== Historical context ===
There are many theories as to the historical context of the piece, including that it was written for Mozart's sister Maria Anna. One theory suggests that the piece is a reduction of an unknown orchestral work by Mozart or perhaps the Allegro movement of a sonata. Another proposes that Mozart arranged another composer's piece, which was common at the time.

=== Date of composition ===
The date of composition attributed to Mozart's Allegro in D major is speculated to be 1773 by the Mozarteum Foundation. However, some have disagreed with the estimate including Uri Rom, an Israeli musicologist at Tel Aviv University. He draws similarities between the appearance of the pages in the Nannerl Notenbuch and the manuscript, claiming that it possibly could have been a part of the Notenbuch. This would imply a dating between 1766 and 1767, which is a few years earlier than the estimate given by the Mozarteum Foundation.

== Musical structure ==
The Allegro in D major is a relatively short piece, consisting of 70 bars including repeats. It is, as the name suggests, written in D major. The piece is written in 3/4 time.

=== Form ===
The sections in the Allegro in D major do not repeat; the third section is similar to the first in style but the melody is distinct.

The first section lasts until bar 32. It begins in D major, with a repetition of bars 1 through 4, then modulates to the dominant key, A major, in bars 5 and 6. This persists through to bars 23–24, where there is a classical authentic perfect cadence, then after the repeated bars 25–26, again at bar 31 and 32, where the first section has its conclusion.

Bar 33 marks the beginning of the second section, which some would consider the development of the piece (others claim it is an "underdeveloped development"). It still starts in A major but quickly modulates back into D, and is quite different from the previous. It consists of a 4-part voicing and very little subdivision (consisting of primarily quarter notes). Bars 41–48 are actually a repeat of bars 33–40; they're almost entirely identical except for the addition and omission of some middle voices: For example, the A in bar 33 is not present in bar 41, and Mozart chose to change the tie in bar 39 into three distinct quarter notes in bar 47. Another feature that is distinct in bars 41–48 are the eighth notes in bar 48, which lead up to the third section.

The third section begins in bar 49 and lasts through to the end of the piece, at bar 70. There are two sets of two bars – 49–50 and 57–58 – that are identical save for the octave of the notes, and they both repeat once each. The style is very similar to the first section, with many scale-like melodies quite characteristic of Mozart in the right hand and a single voice of accompaniment in the left. There is perfect authentic cadence lasting three bars from 68 to 70, and in D major, with a fermata at the end of bar 70, the piece is concluded.
