= Cello Sonata No. 2 =

Cello Sonata No. 2 may refer to:

- Cello Sonatas Nos. 1 and 2 (Beethoven), by Ludwig van Beethoven
- Cello Sonata No. 2 (Brahms), by Johannes Brahms
- Cello Sonata No. 2 (Mendelssohn), by Felix Mendelssohn
- Cello Sonata No. 2 (Ries), by Ferdinand Ries
- Cello Sonata No. 2 (Fauré), by Gabriel Fauré
- Cello Sonata No. 2 (Enescu), by George Enescu
- Cello Sonata No. 2 (Oswald), by Henrique Oswald
