= Violin Sonata No. 2 =

Violin Sonata No. 2 may refer to:

- Violin Sonata No. 2 (Beethoven)
- Violin Sonata No. 2 (Brahms)
- Violin Sonata No. 2 (Enescu)
- Violin Sonata No. 2 (Fauré)
- Violin Sonata No. 2 (Grieg)
- Violin Sonata No. 2 (Hill)
- Violin Sonata No. 2 (Hindemith)
- Violin Sonata No. 2 by Charles Ives
- Violin Sonata No. 2 (Mozart)
- Violin Sonata No. 2 (Prokofiev)
- Violin Sonata No. 2 (Ravel)
- Violin Sonata No. 2 (Saint-Saëns)
- Violin Sonata No. 2 (Schumann)
- Violin Sonata No. 2 (Stanford)
- Violin Sonata No. 2 (Ysaÿe)
