= Piano Sonata No. 3 (Mozart) =

1775 composition by W. A. Mozart

Piano Sonata in B♭ major
- No. 3
- by W. A. Mozart
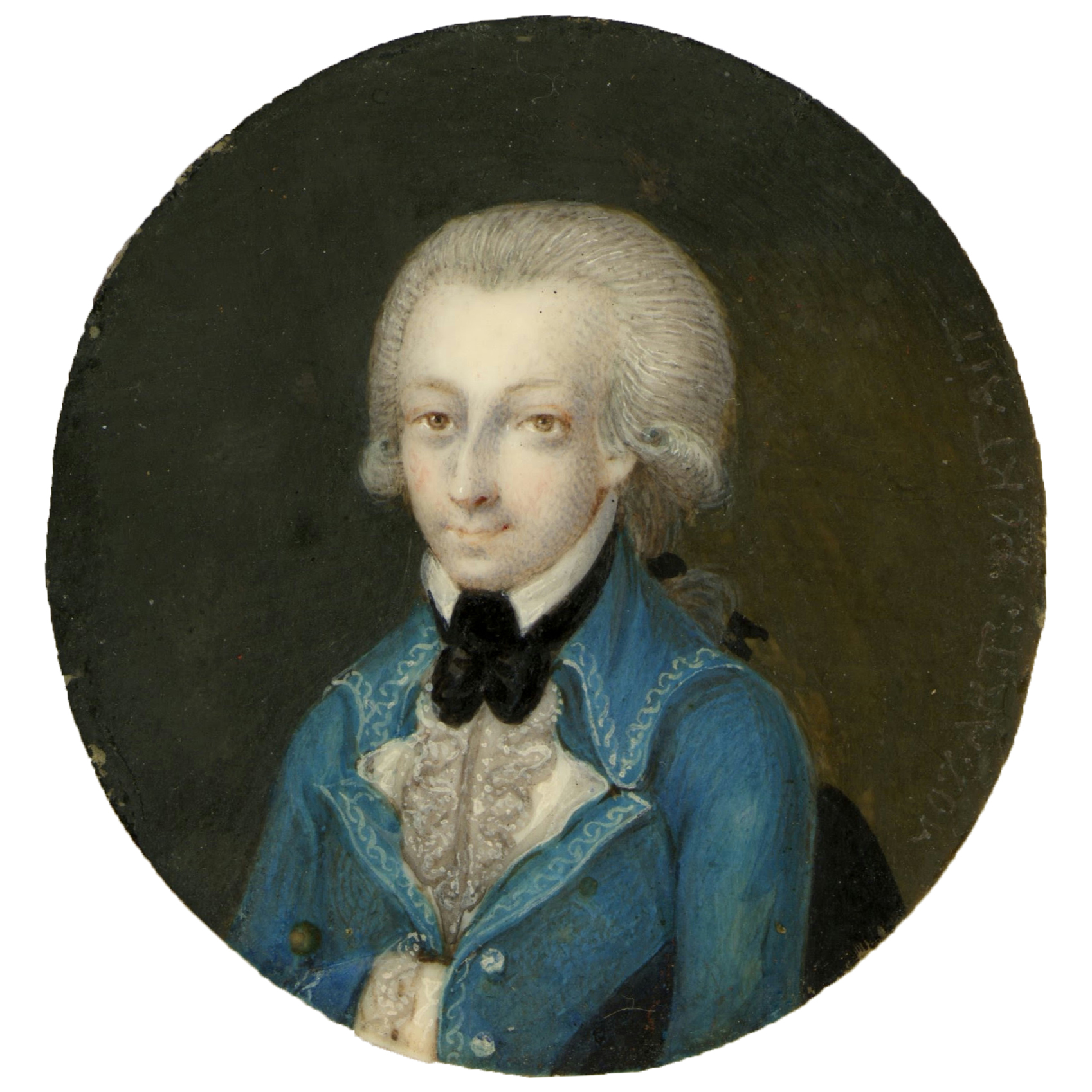
- 1773 miniature of Mozart
- Key: B♭ major
- Catalogue: K. 281 / 189f
- Style: Classical period
- Composed: Early 1775
- Movements: Allegro, Andante amoroso, Rondo (allegro)

Wolfgang Amadeus Mozart's Piano Sonata No. 3 in B♭ major, K. 281/189f, (1775) is a piano sonata in three movements:

Digital piano capture (11:13)

1. Allegro
2. Andante amoroso (E♭ major)
3. Rondo (allegro)

A performance takes approximately between 11½ and 15 minutes.

This piano sonata is one of the most virtuosic pieces Mozart ever composed, written when Mozart visited Munich for the production of La finta giardiniera from late 1774 to the beginning of the following March.
