= B-flat major =

Music scale based on B♭

- Relative key: G minor
- Parallel key: B-flat minor
- Dominant key: F major
- Subdominant key: E-flat major

Component pitches
- B♭, C, D, E♭, F, G, A

B-flat major is a major scale based on B♭, with pitches B♭, C, D, E♭, F, G, and A. Its key signature has two flats. Its relative minor is G minor and its parallel minor is B-flat minor.

The B-flat major scale is:

Changes needed for the melodic and harmonic versions of the scale are written in with accidentals as necessary. The B-flat harmonic major and melodic major scales are:

Many transposing instruments are pitched in B-flat major, including the most common types of clarinet and trumpet, along with the tenor saxophone and soprano saxophone. As a result, B-flat major is one of the most common keys for concert band compositions.

== Scale degree chords ==
The scale degree chords of B♭ major are:

- Tonic – B♭ major
- Supertonic – C minor
- Mediant – D minor
- Subdominant – E♭ major
- Dominant – F major
- Submediant – G minor
- Leading tone – A diminished

== Notable classical compositions ==
- François Couperin
  - Les Barricades Mystérieuses
- Johann Sebastian Bach
  - Brandenburg Concerto No. 6
- Luigi Boccherini
  - Cello Concerto No. 9, G. 482
- Joseph Haydn
  - Symphony No. 85 (La Reine)
  - Symphony No. 98
  - Symphony No. 102
  - Sinfonia Concertante for Violin, Cello, Oboe and Bassoon
  - String Quartet Op. 50 No. 1
  - String Quartet Op. 76 No. 4 (Sunrise)
- Wolfgang Amadeus Mozart
  - Symphony No. 2
  - Symphony No. 5
  - Symphony No. 24
  - Symphony No. 33
  - Piano Concerto No. 6
  - Piano Concerto No. 15
  - Piano Concerto No. 18
  - Piano Concerto No. 27
  - String Quintet No. 1
  - String Quartet No. 17 (Hunt)
  - Violin Sonata No. 32
  - Piano Sonata No. 3
  - Piano Sonata No. 13 (Linz)
  - Piano Sonata No. 17
- Ludwig van Beethoven
  - Piano Concerto No. 2
  - Symphony No. 4
  - String Quartet, Op 18 No. 6
  - String Quartet Op. 130
  - The Große Fuge for string quartet
  - Piano Sonata, Op. 22
  - Piano Sonata, Op. 106 (Hammerklavier)
  - Piano Trio, Op. 97 (Archduke)
- Franz Schubert
  - Impromptu No. 3, Op. 142
  - Mass No. 3
  - Der Hirt auf dem Felsen, D. 965
  - Piano Sonata No. 21, D. 960
  - Piano Trio No. 1, D. 898
  - Symphony No. 2
  - Symphony No. 5
- Felix Mendelssohn
  - Symphony No. 2 (Lobgesang)
  - String Quintet No. 2
  - Cello Sonata No. 1
- Frédéric Chopin
  - Variations on "Là ci darem la mano" for piano and orchestra, Op. 2
  - Mazurka Op. 7, No. 1
  - Prelude Op. 28, No. 21 "Sunday"
  - Polonaise Op. 71, No. 2
- Robert Schumann
  - Symphony No. 1, Op. 38, (Frühling)
  - The second, fourth and sixth movement of Kreisleriana, Op. 16
  - Humoreske for piano, Op. 20
  - Faschingsschwank aus Wien for piano, Op. 26
- Franz Liszt
  - Transcendental Étude No. 5 (Feux follets) from Transcendental Études
- Anton Bruckner
  - Symphony No. 5
- Johannes Brahms
  - Piano Concerto No. 2
  - String Quartet No. 3
  - String Sextet No. 1
  - Variations and Fugue on a Theme by Handel
  - Variations on a Theme by Haydn
- Max Bruch
  - Octet
- Modest Mussorgsky
  - "Promenade" from Pictures at an Exhibition
- Ernest Chausson
  - Symphony
- Vincent d'Indy
  - Symphony No. 2
- Ottorino Respighi
  - "The Pines of the Villa Borghese" from Pines of Rome
- Bohuslav Martinů
  - Symphony no. 1
- Sergei Prokofiev
  - Symphony No. 5
  - Piano Concerto No. 4
  - Piano Sonata No. 7
  - Piano Sonata No. 8
- Dmitri Shostakovich
  - String Quartet No. 5

No.	Flats		Sharps	
No.	Major	minor	Major	minor
0	C	a	C	a
1	F	d	G	e
2	B♭	g	D	b
3	E♭	c	A	f♯
4	A♭	f	E	c♯
5	D♭	b♭	B	g♯
6	G♭	e♭	F♯	d♯
7	C♭	a♭	C♯	a♯
8	F♭	d♭	G♯	e♯
