= Piano Sonata No. 15 (Mozart) =

Work by W. A. Mozart

Piano Sonata in F major
- No. 15
- by W. A. Mozart
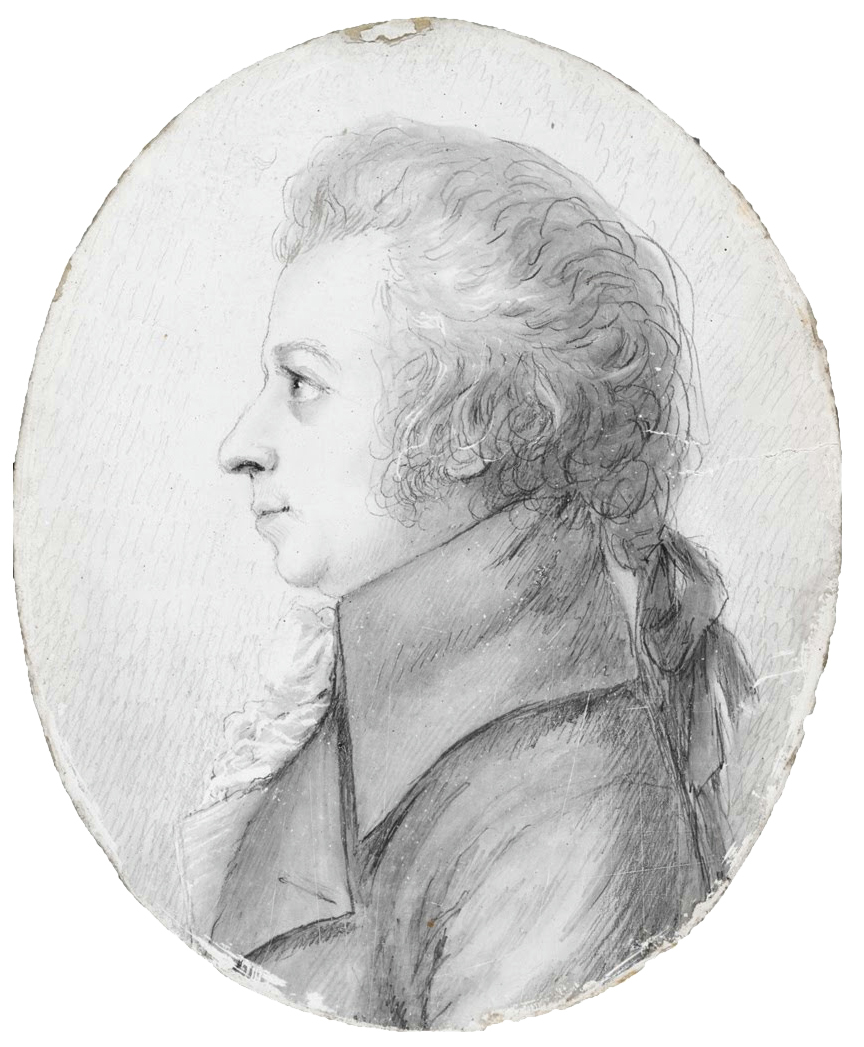
- Drawing of Mozart in silverpoint by Dora Stock in 1789
- Key: F major
- Catalogue: K. 533
- Style: Classical period
- Composed: 1788
- Movements: Three (Allegro, Andante, Rondo: Allegretto)

Wolfgang Amadeus Mozart's Piano Sonata No. 15 in F major, KV 533/494 (finished 3 January 1788) is a sonata in three movements:

1. Allegro
2. Andante in B♭ major
3. Rondo: Allegretto

A typical performance takes about 23 minutes.

The Rondo was originally a stand-alone piece composed by Mozart in 1786 (Rondo No. 2, K. 494 in the Köchel catalogue). In 1788, Mozart wrote the first two movements of K. 533 and incorporated a revised version of K. 494 as the finale, having lengthened it in order to provide a more substantial counterpart to the other two movements.

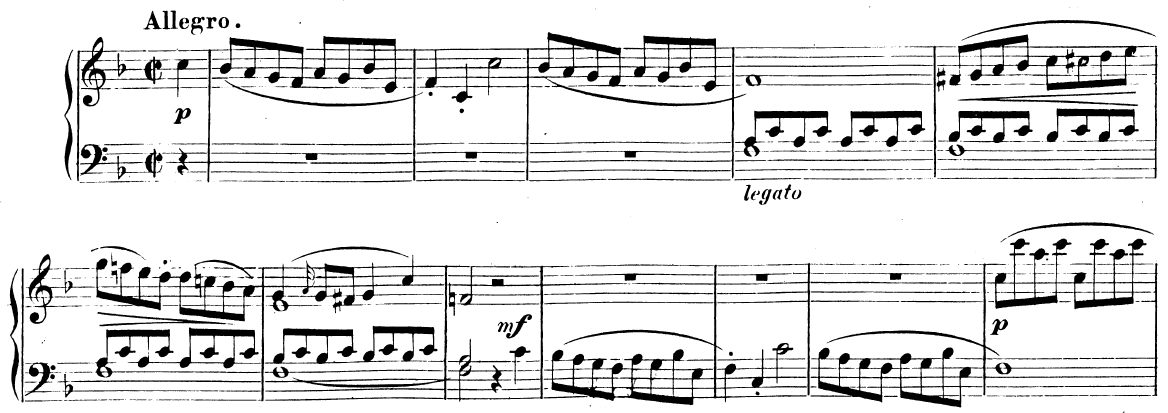
Opening of the sonata

== Other arrangements ==
Edvard Grieg arranged this sonata for 2 pianos, by adding further accompaniment on the secondo part, whilst the primo part plays the original. This attempt to "impart to several of Mozart's sonatas a tonal effect appealing to our modern ears" serves to document the taste of Grieg's late nineteenth-century Norwegian audience. A notable recording is that of Elisabeth Leonskaja and Sviatoslav Richter.
