= Piano Sonata No. 14 (Mozart) =

1784 piano sonata by W. A. Mozart

Piano Sonata in C minor
- No. 14
- by W. A. Mozart
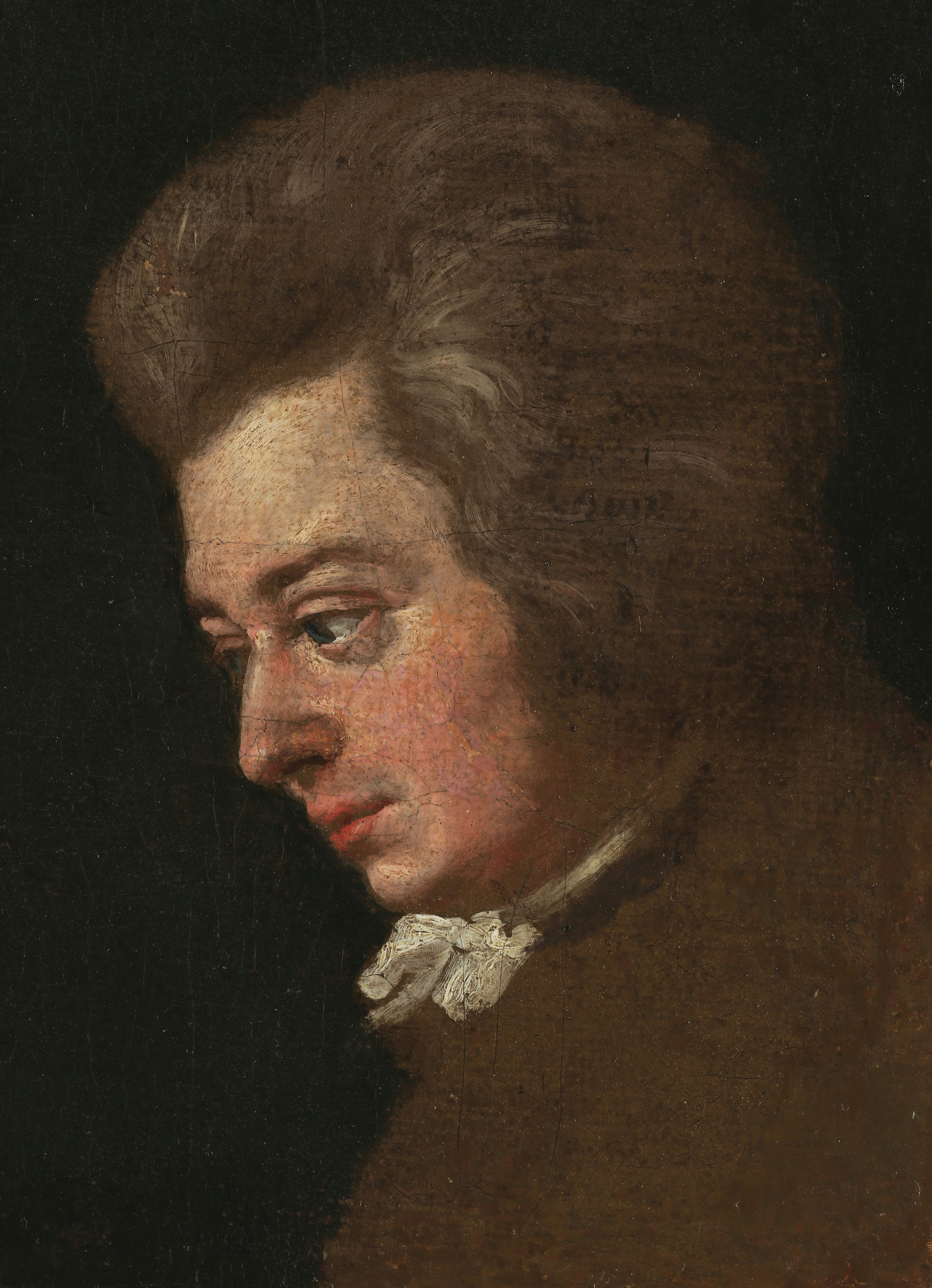
- Detail of Lange's 1782–83 Mozart portrait
- Key: C minor
- Catalogue: K. 457
- Style: Classical period
- Composed: 1784
- Dedication: Theresia von Trattner
- Published: 1785
- Movements: Three (Molto allegro, Adagio, Allegro assai)

The Piano Sonata No. 14 in C minor, K. 457, by Wolfgang Amadeus Mozart was composed and completed in 1784, with the official date of completion recorded as 14 October 1784 in Mozart's own catalogue of works. It was published in December 1785 together with the Fantasy in C minor, K. 475, as Opus 11 by the publishing firm Artaria, Mozart's main Viennese publisher.

The title page bore a dedication to Theresia von Trattner (1758–1793), who was one of Mozart's pupils in Vienna. Her husband, Thomas von Trattner (1717–1798), was an important publisher as well as Mozart's landlord in 1784. Eventually, the Trattners would become godparents to four of Mozart's children.

The piano sonata was composed during the approximately 10-year period of Mozart's life as a freelance artist in Vienna after he removed himself from the patronage of the Archbishop of Salzburg in 1781. It is one of the earliest of only six sonatas composed during the Vienna years, and was probably written either as a teaching tool or for personal use. Sonatas during this time were generally written for the domestic sphere – as opposed to a symphony or concerto, they were designed to convey ideas in a small, intimate setting.

A typical performance takes about 18 minutes.

== Movements ==
The work has three movements:

1. Molto allegro (C minor)
2. Adagio (E♭ major)
3. Allegro assai (C minor) 3/4

=== I. Molto allegro ===
I. Molto allegro

The subject is stated boldly in octaves, occurring twice in the first 8 bars. The subject remains strong until the transition, where the opening motif is taken one octave higher, and a scale-type passage modulates the key to the relative major, E♭ major. The second subject has some very graceful melodies supported by Alberti bass, which continue until the second half of the piece. This section uses material from the first and second subjects to form the development. The most unstable section harmonically, this goes through the keys of C major, F minor, G minor, and returning to the original part in C minor. The recapitulation occurs from bar 100 to 168, this time the second subject is in C minor instead of the E♭ major of the exposition, and the coda ends the piece from bar 168 to 185.

=== II. Adagio ===
II. Adagio (MIDI rendition)

The principal subject of this movement is seven bars long, consisting mainly of bass broken chord accompaniment and a melody. The subject, however, sub-divides itself into regular one-bar sections, which is very unusual. At bar 8, the melody modulates immediately to the key of B♭ major, where a new melody is introduced. This carries on until the prolonged cadential extension from bar 13 to 16. The rest of bar 16 consist of a link on the dominant of E♭ major to the next section, so that the music can modulate back and repeat the original seven-bar melody again, with extra ornaments and decorations added to the melody.

The second section, or episode, begins in A♭ major. This melody starts off exactly the same as the second movement in Beethoven's Pathétique sonata. This first part of the episode modulates to a B♭ major cadence, which gives way to the second section of the episode, commencing in G♭ major. The same melody is repeated, followed by a sequential passage going through A♭ minor, B♭ minor, and C minor, ending on a half-cadence. Two more bars modulate back to E♭ major, where the original melody returns, embellished with decorations and ornaments to the maximum possible. The coda ends the movement, formed from previous material.

=== III. Allegro assai ===
III. Allegro assai (MIDI rendition)

This movement is distinguished by its profound sense of tragedy, setting it apart from the typically upbeat and up-tempo final movements in many of Mozart's sonatas.

The subject, which is unusually long, consists of two parts, both ending with perfect cadences. The first is introduced quietly, with melody in the right hand accompanied by left hand chords, with much calmness. However the second has a great fiery sense to it. Both share distinct and separate ideas. This subject is ended by a prolonged cadential repetition.

There is no passage of transition to the second subject, only a basic chord on E♭'s dominant seventh. The second subject then contains Alberti bass in the left hand, with a dancing, flowing melody in the right hand, completely changing the character in the ringing key of E♭. The second part of this subject is in fact based on a passage of the right hand in the first movement. The bridge to the next section is modulated from E♭ major to C minor.

At this moment, we hear the original principal subject cut short into half. In its place, a dramatic series of chords of F minor's diminished seventh, lasting for just one bar. This then gives way to the middle section of F minor.

This motif is shown twice exactly the same, the first is shown, modulating into G minor, then C minor, where the same cut-in-half principal subject is heard. This is where the motif is repeated the second time, then giving way to the coda.

The coda is founded on the second subject, starting in bar 262, with the right hand leading the melody along with the left hand accompanying with broken chords. In bar 296, the Neapolitan sixth is found in C minor. The coda ends with a perfect cadence.

== Relation of the Fantasy to the Sonata ==
Fantasia in C minor, K. 475

The Fantasia in C minor, K. 475, was completed some seven months after the C minor sonata. Mozart recorded the date of completion as 20 May 1785 in his private catalogue of works. Opinions have differed on whether or not Mozart intended the two to be performed together. Although they were published together as the same opus, Mozart sometimes performed the pieces separately.

The Fantasy by nature has a more improvisational quality than the subsequent sonata, and the pairing presents a classical correlation to the baroque combination of fantasy and fugue. Both the fantasy and sonata are linked by a focus on the bass register and octaves in the bass clef. The styles of both Muzio Clementi and C. P. E. Bach have been suggested to have influenced the composition of the fantasy, whether consciously or subconsciously.

== Significance of the key ==
The Piano Sonata No. 14 in C minor is only one of two piano sonatas Mozart wrote in a minor key, the other being the Piano Sonata No. 8 in A minor, K. 310, which was written six years earlier, around the time of the death of Mozart's mother. Mozart was extremely deliberate in choosing tonalities for his compositions; therefore, his choice of C minor for this sonata implies that this piece was perhaps a very personal work.

== Rediscovered autograph ==
An original autograph of the two pieces was rediscovered in 1990 at the Eastern Baptist Theological Seminary in Philadelphia by Judith DiBona, an amateur pianist and accounting manager at Eastern's sister school. Eugene K. Wolf at the University of Pennsylvania was contacted to identify and authenticate the manuscripts. He emerged with findings concerning the time of composition between the movements of the sonata and the fantasy, which were published in The Journal of Musicology in 1992. First, his findings further confirmed that the Fantasy and Sonata were written independently due to differences of stave spans, paper-types, and even ink color in between the two manuscripts.

Wolf also found differences in paper types between the first and third movements of the sonata and the second Adagio movement, which implies that the second movement was written down at a separate time from the rest of the sonata. He theorizes that the second movement was composed the earliest as an instructional piece for Theresia von Trattner. Since the second movement is in rondo form and slower than the others, it could exist independently from the sonata more easily than the other movements.

== Relation to Beethoven's "Pathétique" ==
Köchel said of this sonata, "Without question this is the most important of all Mozart's pianoforte sonatas. Surpassing all the others by reason of the fire and passion which, to its last note, breathe through it, it foreshadows the pianoforte sonata, as it was destined to become in the hands of Beethoven."

John Gillespie, Professor of Music at the University of California, describes the Piano Sonata No. 14 as a uniquely "somber and passionate" work of Mozart's, and states that "no other music composed before Beethoven contains so many Beethovenian elements," namely the "contrast of themes and the sense of ceaseless struggle."

Mozart's sonata feels in several ways prophetic of Beethoven's C minor sonata Piano Sonata No. 8 in C minor, "Pathétique" (which it predates by roughly fifteen years), and both works share a similar overall structure. One of Mozart's themes in his spacious second movement is very similar to the theme of Beethoven's sonata's second movement.

== Notes ==
=== Sources ===
- Gillespie, John (1965). Five Centuries of Keyboard Music. Wadsworth Publishing Company. ISBN 9780486318790.
- Marks, F. Helena (1921). The Sonata : Its Form and Meaning as Exemplified in the Piano Sonatas by Mozart. London: William Reeves.
- Mercado, Maria R. (1992). The Evolution of Mozart's Pianistic Style. Southern Illinois University Press. ISBN 9780809316908.
- Richner, Thomas (1953). Orientation for Interpreting Mozart's Piano Sonatas. New York: Teachers College, Columbia University.
- Wolf, Eugene K. (1992). "The Rediscovered Autograph of Mozart's Fantasy and Sonata in C minor, K. 475/457". The Journal of Musicology. 10 (1): 3–47. doi:10.2307/763559. JSTOR 763559.
