= Piano Sonata No. 11 (Beethoven) =

Piano sonata written by Beethoven

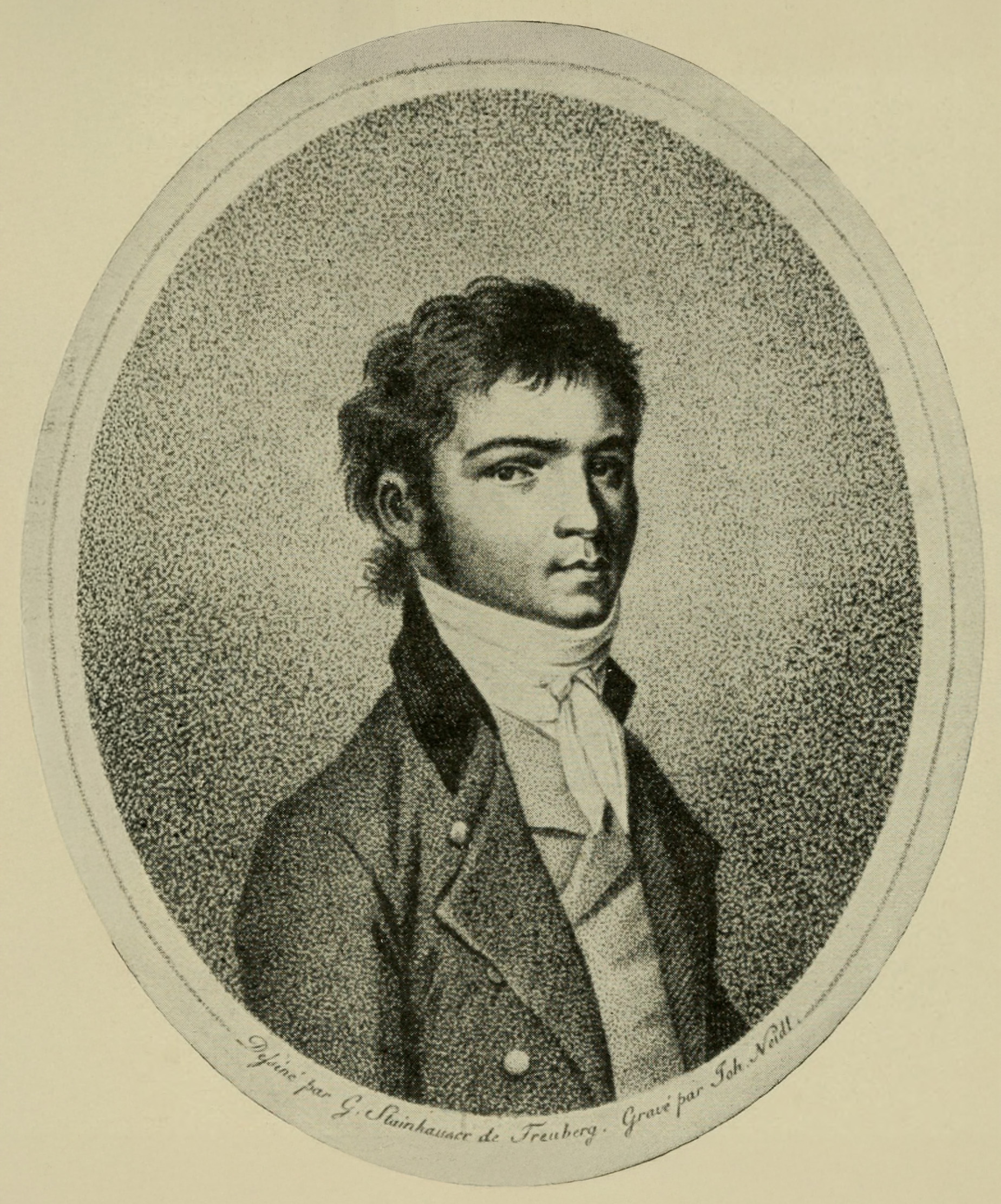
Portrait of Ludwig van Beethoven, aged 29

Ludwig van Beethoven's Piano Sonata No. 11 in B♭ major, Op. 22, was composed in 1800, and published two years later. Beethoven regarded it as the best of his early sonatas, though some of its companions in the cycle have been at least as popular with the public.

Prominent musicologist Donald Francis Tovey has called this work the crowning achievement and culmination of Beethoven's early "grand" piano sonatas (the "grand" modifier was applied by Beethoven to sonatas with four movements instead of three.) Subsequent sonatas find Beethoven experimenting more with form and concept.

== Structure ==
I. Allegro con brio

II. Adagio con molta espressione

III. Menuetto

IV. Rondo: Allegretto
Performed by Artur Schnabel in 1932

The sonata has four movements:

1. Allegro con brio
2. Adagio con molta espressione
3. Menuetto
4. Rondo: Allegretto

A typical performance lasts 25–30 minutes.

=== I. Allegro con brio ===
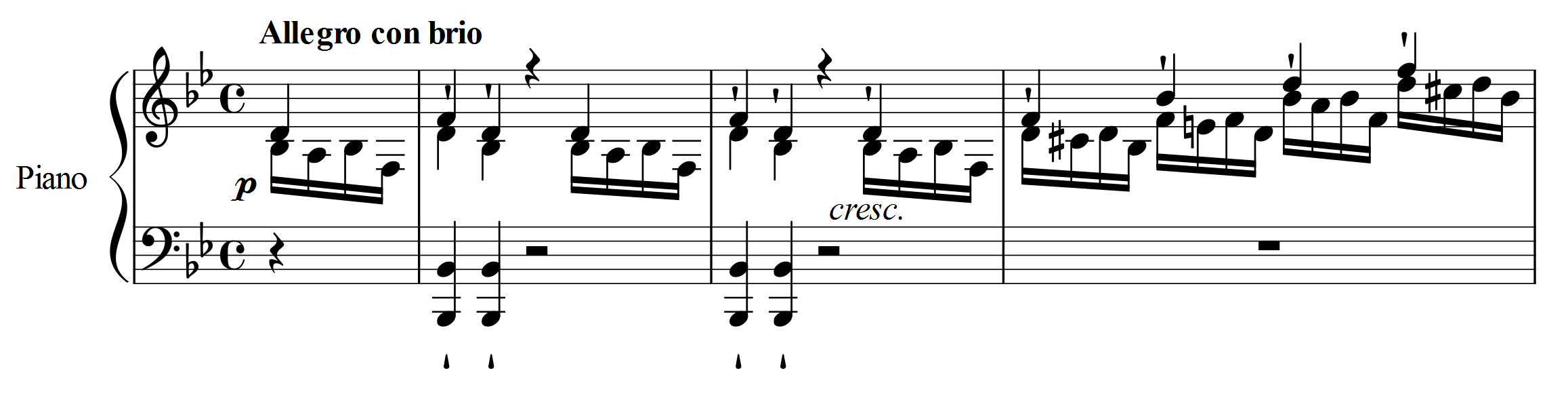

The first movement is in typical sonata form. The exposition starts in the tonic key and transitions into the dominant key as the second theme begins. The development plays around with the closing measures of the exposition before making the right hand play arpeggios as the bass line slowly descends chromatically. The theme of the closing octaves from the exposition comes back again in the bass, leading into a chromatic scale resolving in an F dominant seventh chord (dominant function of the sonata), which sets up the recapitulation. The recapitulation is at first the same as the exposition, but has some changes, with a deviation that sets the rest of the movement to stay in the tonic key.

=== II. Adagio con molta espressione ===
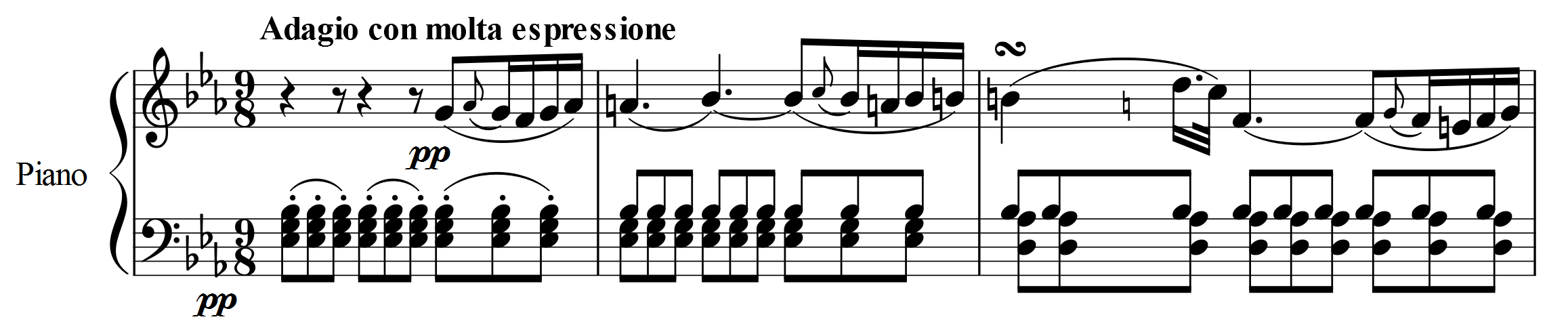

The second movement is in E♭ major and is also in sonata form. Its opening melody is often compared to the later music of Chopin. The exposition starts in the tonic key and ends in the dominant key. The development plays around with the first theme of the exposition, slowly building intensity until both hands play constant sixteenth notes. The right hand plays a second voice above its 16th notes, and a little later, the left hand plays a bass line consisting of just B♭s. The left hand then stops and the right hand flows right into the recapitulation. The recapitulation stays in the tonic key for the rest of the movement.

=== III. Menuetto ===
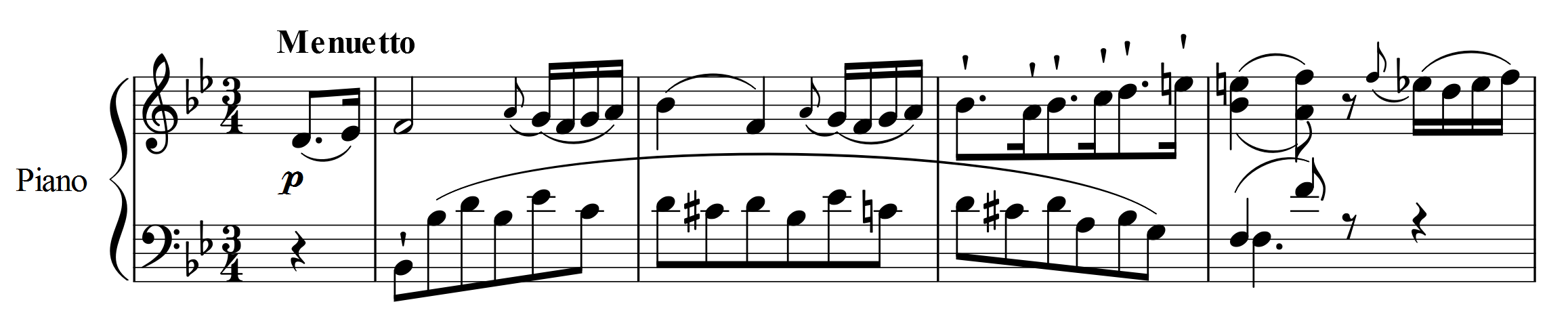

The third movement is in minuet and trio form, but the trio is instead a very contrasting "Minore". The first 30 measures of the Menuetto are in B♭ major, the Minore is in G minor (the relative key of B♭). The end of the Minore is marked Menuetto D.C. senza replica which means to play the Menuetto again, this time without taking the repeats. This is the shortest movement.

=== IV. Rondo: Allegretto ===
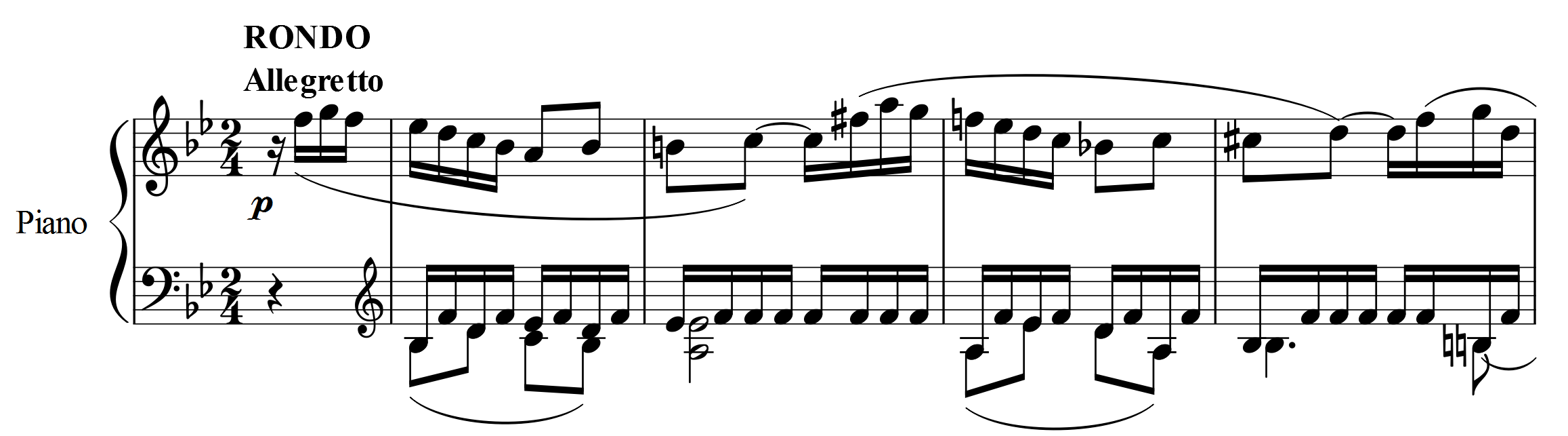

The fourth movement is in rondo form: A–B–A–C–A–B–A–Coda. The first "A" theme starts in the tonic key, and the "B" theme transitions into the dominant key with big grand arpeggios in the right hand using a good portion of the keyboard. After the arpeggios, both hands play around with the "A" theme's melody before arriving back to the tonic key at the second "A" theme (with very little deviation from the first "A" theme). Suddenly, the "C" theme begins with a key change into B♭ minor (although not marked in the key signature). The sharp forte chords, although in stark contrast with the rest of the rondo, bear some resemblance to the first few chords of the "B" theme. The right hand then plays urgent thirty-second notes while the left hand supports with staccato sixteenth notes. This reaches a climax, a call-and-response play on the beginning of the "C" theme, and the thirty-second-note passage with the climax again.

Not unlike the end of the "B" theme, the "A" theme's melody is suggested a few times before returning to the tonic key and a third "A" section. However, the melody of this "A" section is in the left hand until the right hand has a two-measure thirty-second-note run that flows into the rest of the melody, this time the right hand octaves being broken. The next section (second "B" section) is very similar to the first "B" section except that it stays in the tonic key all the way through. A fake "A" section is played in the subdominant key before developing into the final "A" section where the melody consists of triplet sixteenth notes instead of regular sixteenth notes. The very end of the final "A" section runs right into the coda that builds up to an exciting final climax before relaxing to a piano dynamic level and two big chords (dominant seventh to tonic) to conclude the sonata.
