= Piano Sonata No. 1 (Mozart) =

1775 composition by W. A. Mozart

- by W. A. Mozart
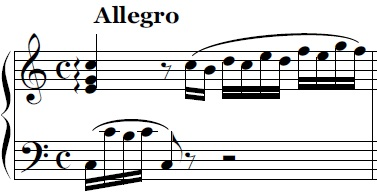
- The beginning
- Key: C major
- Catalogue: K. 279 / 189d
- Style: Classical period
- Composed: Early 1775
- Movements: Three (Allegro, Andante, Allegro)

Wolfgang Amadeus Mozart's Piano Sonata No. 1 in C major, K. 279 / 189d (1775), is a piano sonata in three movements. Except for the first part of the opening movement, it was written during Mozart's visit to Munich for the production of La finta giardiniera from December 1774 to March 1775. Although Mozart is known to have written at least five other solo piano sonatas in his youth, K. 279 is the first of his 18 extant solo piano sonatas. A typical performance of the sonata takes about 14 minutes.

== Movements ==
The sonata is in 3 movements:

1. Allegro
2. Andante
3. Allegro

=== I. Allegro ===
The first movement, marked Allegro, is structured in sonata form; the exposition opens with a turning figure for the left hand, which forms the basis for much of this movement. After a repeat of the opening 2 bars, an Alberti bass is introduced for the left hand, whilst the right hand plays the melody based on the opening turning figure. The opening section uses chromatic appoggiaturas for colour. An imperfect cadence leads towards the dominant (G major) in preparation for the 2nd subject, as expected. The second subject focuses on rapid scales and leads to a perfect cadence in G major, ready for the development section. The exposition is repeated, which is standard for sonata form. The development begins in G minor uses the opening theme to follow a series of ascending arpeggios in several keys before moving towards G major and then back to the tonic, C major, for the recapitulation. The recapitulation follows a similar structure to the exposition, although the imperfect cadence that led to the dominant previously now leads to the final 10 bars of the exposition, this time in the tonic key. The first movement ends with a perfect cadence and a three bar elaboration on the tonic with an inverted c major chord.

=== II. Andante ===
The Andante is full of expressive shading, the result of Mozart's harmonic freedom. This movement is based in F major, the subdominant of the whole work's tonal home and is structured in sonata form. By the end of the exposition, Mozart has modulated to the dominant, C major and begins the development in this key. The work then quickly makes temporary transitions through G and D minor, in order to move back to the tonic for the recapitulation, which follows the exposition closely.

=== III. Allegro ===
The Allegro is in 2/4 time, and is based in C major. This features an unusually active part for the left hand, another extended development section, and a surprising close: Mozart rounds the sonata off with two firm chords, which he marks '[[Coda (music)]Coda]]'.
