= Piano Sonata No. 18 (Mozart) =

1805 musical work in D major

Piano Sonata in D major
- No. 18
- by W. A. Mozart
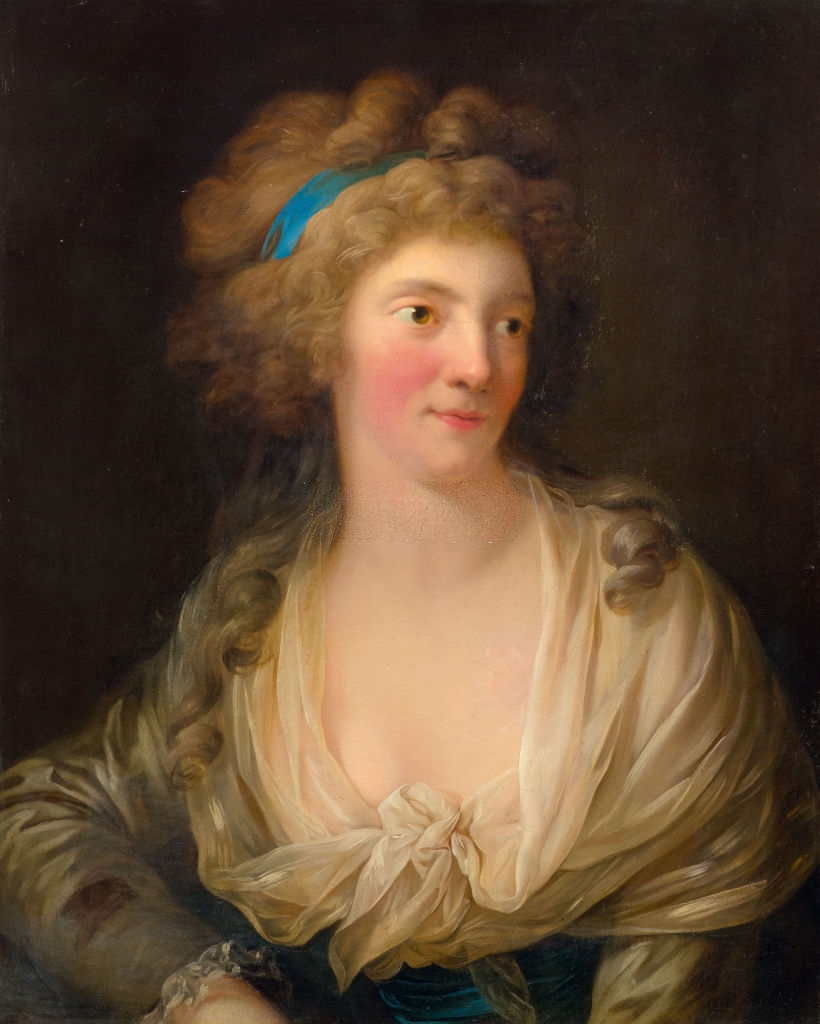
- Princess Frederica Charlotte of Prussia, by Anton Graff
- Other name: The Hunt; The Trumpet Sonata
- Key: D major
- Catalogue: K. 576
- Style: Classical period
- Composed: 1789
- Dedication: Princess Frederica Charlotte of Prussia
- Published: 1805
- Movements: Allegro, Adagio, Allegretto

The Piano Sonata No. 18 in D major, K. 576, was composed by Wolfgang Amadeus Mozart as part of a set of six for Princess Frederica Charlotte of Prussia in 1789. It is sometimes nicknamed "Trumpet Sonata" or "Hunt Sonata" for the hornlike opening. The sonata, having a typical performance duration of about 15 minutes, is Mozart's last. It was the only one of the intended set of six.

== Date of the sonata ==
In a letter to a fellow Freemason Michael von Puchberg, dated 12 July 1789, Mozart wrote "meanwhile I am working on six easy piano sonatas for Princess Friederike and six quartets for the King". Hermann Abert believed K. 576 to be one of these sonatas; however, Wolfgang Plath and Wolfgang Rehm stated in the Neue Mozart-Ausgabe that they doubted this, as K. 576 is demanding to play, often considered one of Mozart's hardest sonatas, due to its technically difficult counterpoint passages. Charles Rosen offered a moderate viewpoint, considering that Mozart may have mistakenly believed that these passages were easy (as they are in two parts, one in each hand), even if they are not actually so in practice. The work was published posthumously in 1805.

== Movements ==
As was typical of the time, the work is in three movements, in a standard fast, slow, fast order:

=== I. Allegro ===
In D major, the first movement is in sonata form and begins with both hands in unison, followed by some trills and a repeat in E minor. This material is used and varied for the first theme, finally cadencing to the dominant, where the second theme provides a more graceful contrast to the grandness of the first. The development section includes many different keys, but starts in the dominant, using counterpoint and harmonic imbalance and exploration. This gives a feeling of tension, which is then resolved before returning to the recapitulation in the home key. Tension and release was a key aspect of the classical era, as it provided composers with a chance to interrupt cadences and draw out tension in order to create an exciting piece. It also helped to extend melodies as a new theme could be made after the release, as is shown in this movement.

=== II. Adagio ===
Example of a borrowed chord (vii^{o}^{4}_{3} = G♯–B–D–F♮)

The middle movement is in the dominant key of A major and includes many scale passages as well as counterpoint. Mozart uses harmonic exploration throughout the sonata such as suspensions and dissonances. There are some chromatic elements in this movement, as is common in many of Mozart's later works. Diminished chords are used to help modulate frequently and a series of keys are cadenced into. These harmonies can also allow more melodic techniques to be used.

=== III. Allegretto ===
The last movement has a playful mood and is light in texture, however the articulation is marked carefully and precisely to maintain clarity, as was common of the time. It is in sonata rondo form. The first theme is followed by a number of scale passages and a short series of arpeggios. The same material is used for the rest of the piece, although there are some differences towards the end.
