= Piano Sonata No. 4 (Mozart) =

1774 composition by W. A. Mozart

Piano Sonata in E-flat major
- No. 4
- by W. A. Mozart
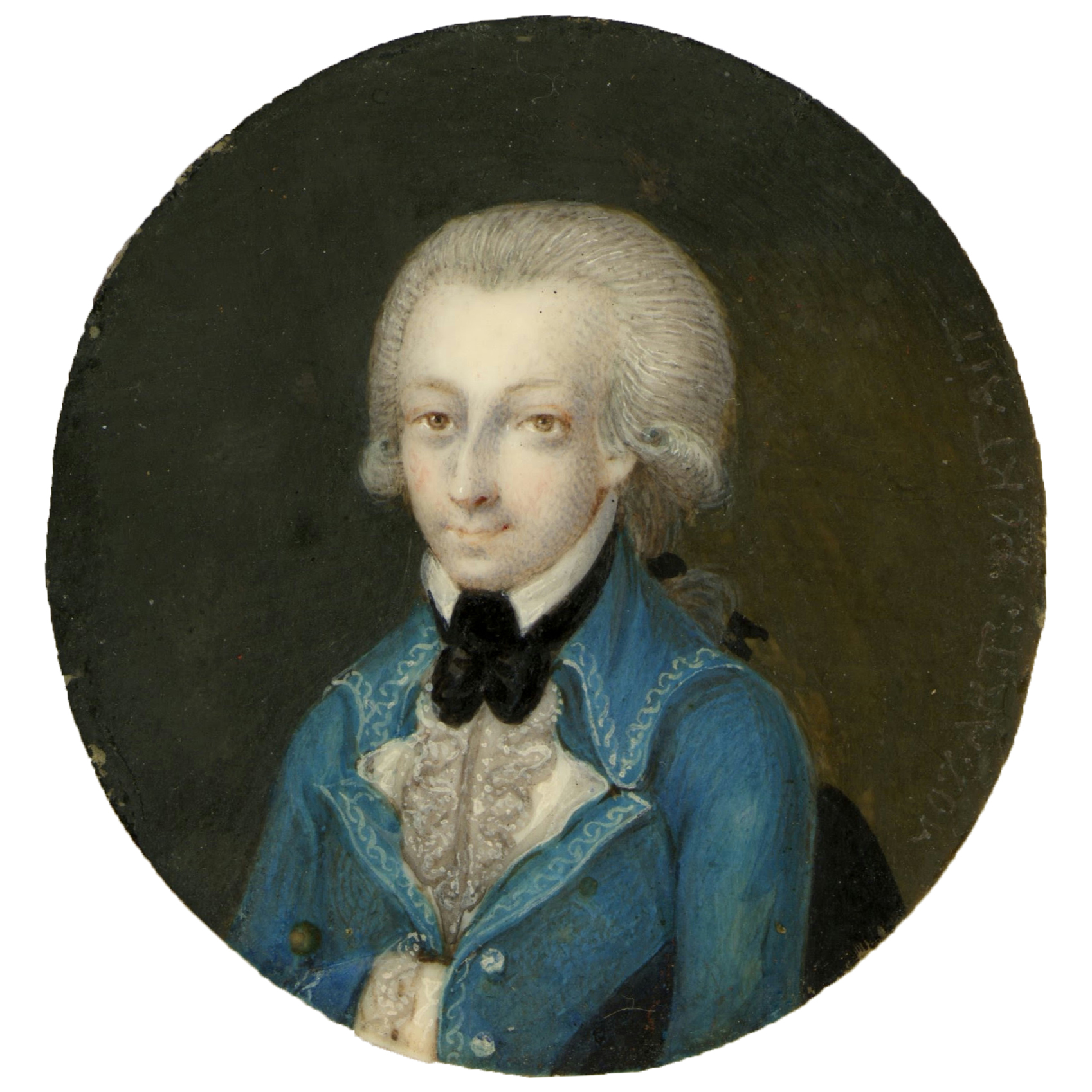
- 1773 miniature of Mozart
- Key: E♭ major
- Catalogue: K. 282 / 189g
- Style: Classical period
- Composed: 1774
- Movements: Three (Adagio, Menuetto I and II, Allegro)

Wolfgang Amadeus Mozart's Piano Sonata No. 4 in E♭ major, K. 282/189g, (1774) is a piano sonata in three movements:

1. Adagio
2. Menuetto I and II (Menuetto I is in B♭ major, Menuetto II is in E♭ major, then returns to Menuetto I)
3. Allegro

A typical performance takes about 12 minutes.

Mozart wrote the work down during a visit to Munich for the production of La finta giardiniera from late 1774 to the beginning of the following March.

The first movement is in sonata form. The second movement consists of two minuets, of which the first one is in the dominant key of B♭ major and the second one moves to the tonic (home) key of E♭ major, after which the first minuet in B♭ major is repeated, resulting in an A–B–A form overall. The third movement is also in sonata form and returns in the home key in E♭ major.
