= Piano Sonata No. 13 (Mozart) =

1784 composition by W. A. Mozart

- Linz
- by W. A. Mozart
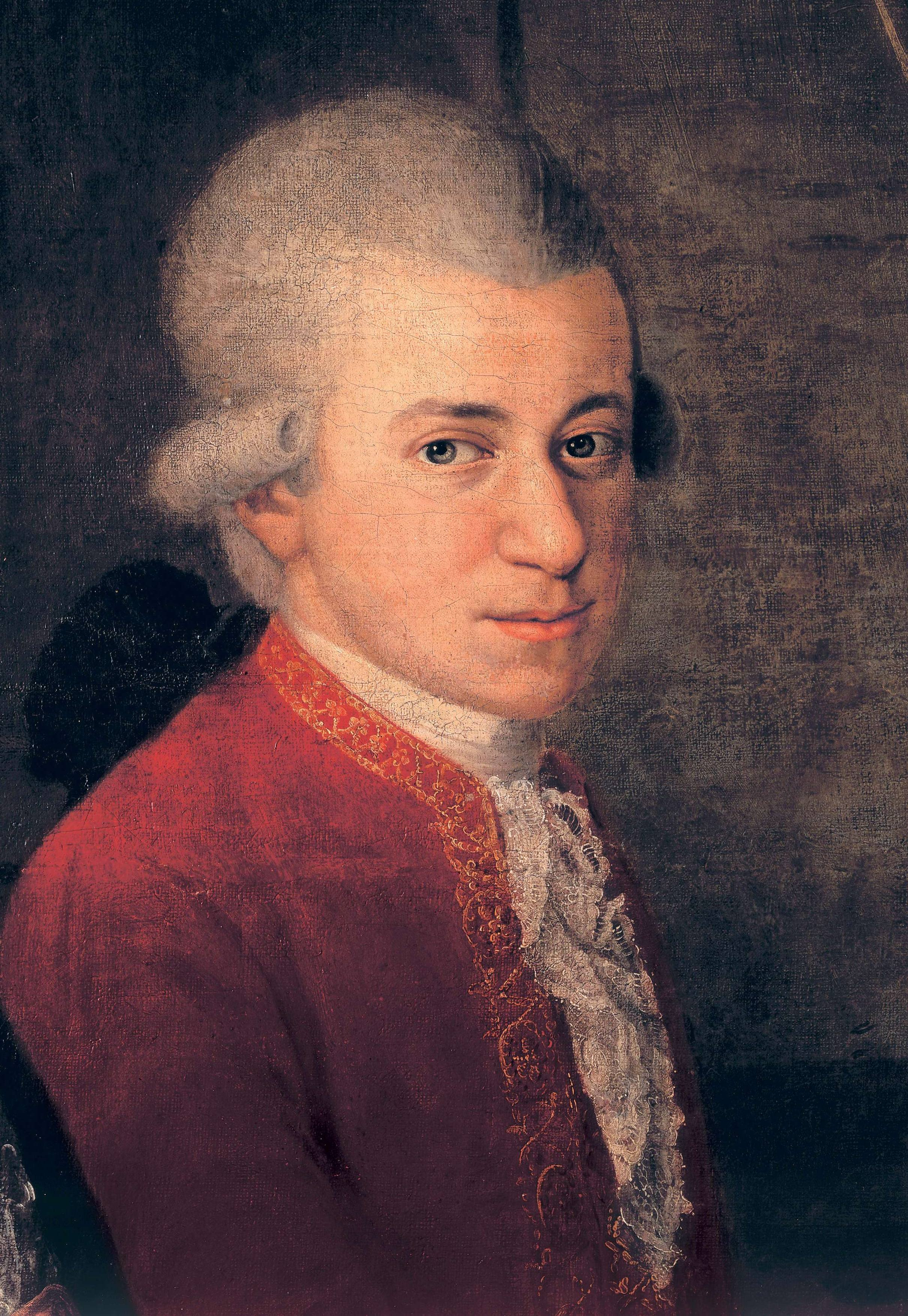
- Detail of Wolfgang from the 1780–81 Portrait of the Mozart Family
- Key: B-flat major
- Catalogue: K. 333 / 315c
- Style: Classical period
- Composed: 1783
- Published: 1784
- Movements: Three (Allegro, Andante cantabile, Allegretto grazioso)

The Piano Sonata No. 13 in B-flat major, K. 333 (315c), also known as the "Linz Sonata", was composed by Wolfgang Amadeus Mozart in Linz at the end of 1783.

The autograph manuscript of the sonata is preserved in the Berlin State Library.

== Dating ==
There is no doubt the sonata was first published on 21 April 1784 in Vienna by Christoph Torricella (along with K. 284 and K. 454, as op. 7). The actual date of composition, however, has proven more difficult to determine. Because the manuscript is not written on the type of music paper Mozart is known to have used in Vienna, scholars believed the piece was composed before Mozart moved there. Thus Köchel, in the first edition of his Mozart catalog (1862), gave the hypothetical date 1779, later clarified by Georges de Saint-Foix (1936) to "Salzburg, beginning of January–March 1779." However, Alfred Einstein, in the third edition of the Köchel catalog (1937), said it was composed in "late summer 1778 in Paris." This date was maintained even until the sixth edition of the Köchel catalog (1964).

More recently, this date has been invalidated by the findings of Wolfgang Plath and Alan Tyson. On the basis of Mozart's script, Plath assigns the piece to the time around 1783/84, "likely not long before the appearance of the first print." Furthermore, Tyson convincingly demonstrates through paper tests that the work was composed at the end of 1783, likely in November, around the same time as the "Linz Symphony", K. 425, when the Mozart couple made a stopover in Linz on their way back to Vienna from Salzburg. This new dating also fits stylistic criteria.

== Movements ==
The work is a sonata in three movements:

1. Allegro
2. Andante cantabile in E-flat major
3. Allegretto grazioso

A typical performance takes about 23 minutes.

=== I. Allegro ===
I. Allegro
performed by Bernd Krueger.

The first movement is in sonata form and is generally lively in character. It begins in the key of B♭ major and eventually cadences on the dominant, F major. The development section starts in F major and modulates through several keys before recapitulating on the tonic.

=== II. Andante cantabile ===
II. Andante cantabile
performed by Bernd Krueger.

The second movement is marked Andante cantabile and is also in sonata form, but in the subdominant key of E♭ major. The movement opens with thirds in the right hand progressing to the more lyrical theme of the movement accompanied by flowing broken triads in the left hand. It soon modulates to B♭ major for a minuet-like section. After this, the movement begins to modulate back to E♭ major for a repeat of the exposition. However, after the first repeat, just as it seems to settle again in E♭ major, the development part begins in F minor. Then, it modulates to C minor, to A♭ major, to F minor, then D♭ minor, then A♭ minor, and finally back to the tonic, E♭ major at which point the recapitulation occurs. There are some striking dissonances in this movement, especially at the beginning of the development section..

=== III. Allegretto grazioso ===
III. Allegretto grazioso
performed by Bernd Krueger.

The third movement is a sonata-rondo which unusually climaxes in a substantial composed Cadenza between bars 171 and 198. Some aspects of the melody are suggestive of the melody from the first movement, especially in the final phrases of the coda. The often virtuosic passagework and inclusion of a cadenza preceded by a forte tonic 6/4 are generic indicators of Mozart's concerto writing and are suggestive of a playful blending of sonata and concerto styles.
