= Piano Sonata No. 17 (Mozart) =

1789 composition by W. A. Mozart

Piano Sonata in B♭ major
- No. 17
- by W. A. Mozart
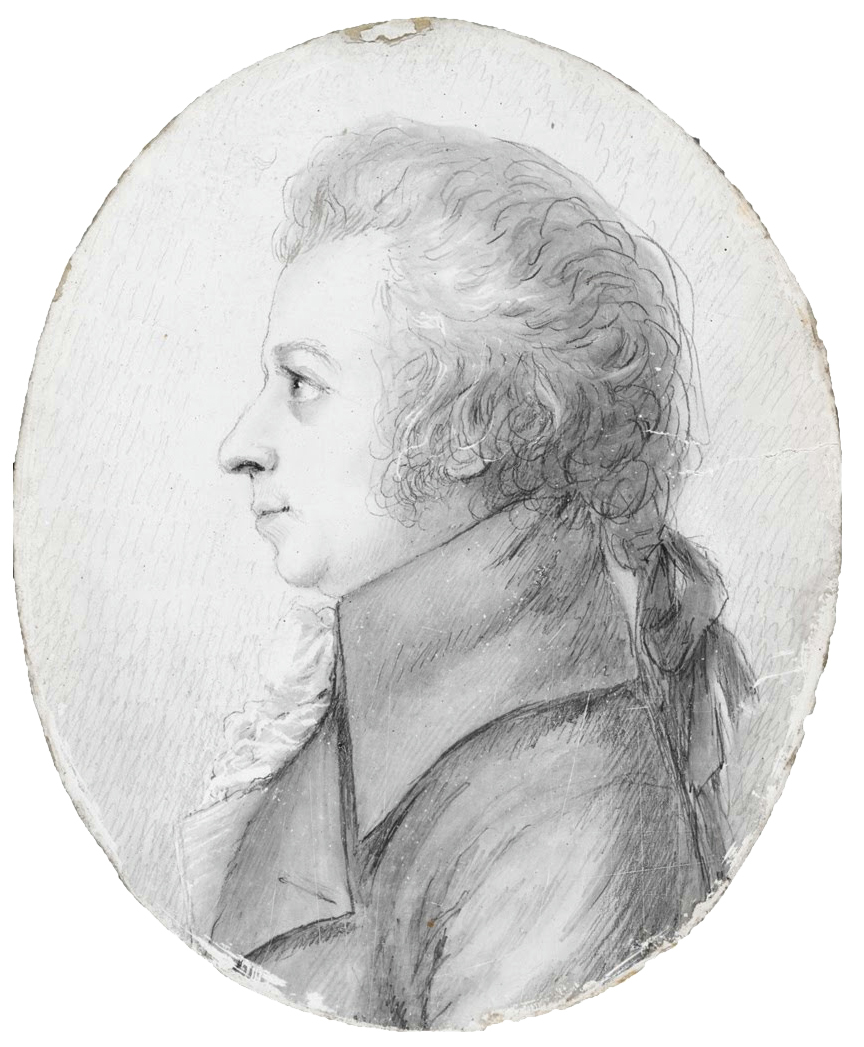
- Drawing of Mozart in silverpoint by Dora Stock in 1789
- Key: B♭ major
- Catalogue: K. 570
- Style: Classical period
- Composed: February 1789
- Movements: Allegro, Adagio, Allegretto

Wolfgang Amadeus Mozart's Piano Sonata No. 17 in B♭ major, K. 570, dated February 1789, is a sonata in three movements:

I. Allegro

II. Adagio

III. Allegretto
performed by Bernd Krueger

1. Allegro in 3/4
2. Adagio (E♭ major) in 4/4
3. Allegretto in 2/4

A typical performance takes about 18 minutes.

There is an accompanying violin part of doubtful origin in many 1800 editions; the piano part is exactly the same as for piano solo. Neue Mozart-Ausgabe (NMA) describe it as an addition by either Johann Anton André or Johann Mederitsch.
