= Piano Sonata No. 9 (Mozart) =

1777 composition by W. A. Mozart

Piano Sonata in D major
- No. 9
- by W. A. Mozart
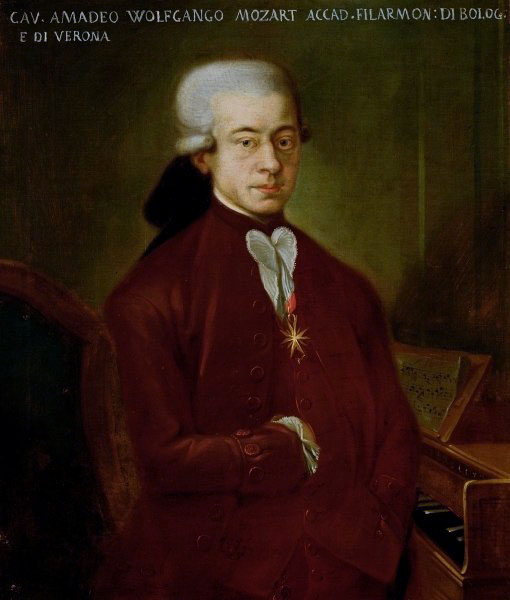
- The young composer, a 1777 copy of a lost painting
- Key: D major
- Catalogue: K. 311 / 284c
- Style: Classical period
- Composed: 1777
- Published: 1782
- Movements: Three (Allegro con spirito, Andante con espressione, Rondeau – Allegro)

Wolfgang Amadeus Mozart's Piano Sonata No. 9 in D major, K. 311 / 284c, was written during the composer's stay in Augsburg and Mannheim in November–December 1777, and is contemporaneous with his Sonata No. 7 in C major, K. 309 (Mozart wrote his Sonata K. 310 in the summer of the following year in Paris). The three sonatas K. 309–311 were published as a set 'Opus IV' in about 1782 by Franz Joseph Heina in Paris.

I. Allegro con spirito

II. Andantino con espressione

III. Rondo Allegro
performed by Bernd Krueger

The work has three movements:

1. Allegro con spirito, 4/4
2. Andantino con espressione, G major 2/4
3. Rondeau (Allegro), 6/8

A typical performance takes about 15 to 17 minutes.

The first movement is in sonata form. Its first subject has a quasi-orchestral opening, and its second subject in the dominant key (A major) is quieter. The development section is almost entirely based on the last four bars of the exposition.

The second movement has an episodic structure A–B–A–B–A–coda. The second theme's melody is gently decorated with syncopation, accompanied by broken chords in the left hand. This key is G major, the subdominant of D major.

Lastly, the most technically demanding movement of the three is a sonata rondo, with a short central episode in B minor (the main key's relative minor). A slow cadenza-like passage containing a rapid ascending chromatic scale leads back to the first theme. In this passage the beginnings of the main theme of the famous second movement of the Piano Concerto No. 21 in C major, K. 467, can be heard emerging, 8 years before he wrote it in 1785.
