= Piano Sonata No. 2 (Mozart) =

1774 composition by W. A. Mozart

Piano Sonata in F major
- No. 2
- by W. A. Mozart
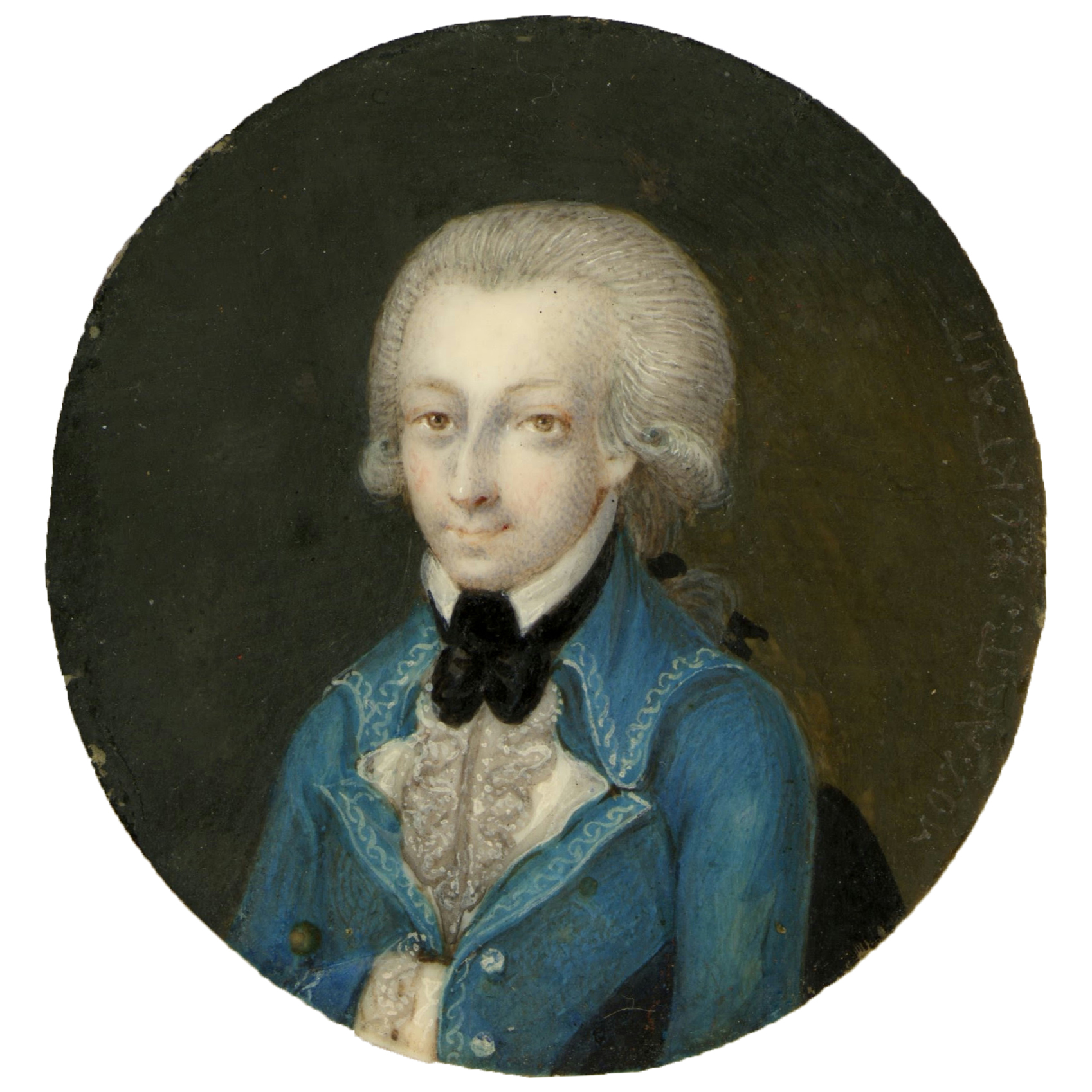
- 1773 miniature of Mozart
- Key: F major
- Catalogue: K. 280 / 189e
- Style: Classical period
- Composed: 1774
- Movements: Three (Allegro assai, Adagio, Presto)

Wolfgang Amadeus Mozart's Piano Sonata No. 2 in F major, K. 280/189e, (1774) is a piano sonata in three movements. The work was written down along with other piano sonatas during the visit Mozart paid to Munich for the production of La finta giardiniera from late 1774 to the beginning of the following March.

A typical performance of the sonata takes about 14 minutes.

== Music ==
=== I. Allegro assai ===
The first movement of the sonata is in sonata form, and consists of an exposition of three themes of new material, a development varying and combining the themes from the exposition, and a recapitulation, in which the exposition is repeated and varied.

The sonata begins with the first theme of the exposition, which itself begins with a forte arpeggiated chord, followed by three thirds. The theme next contains a series of falling quarter notes over block chords and Alberti bass, rapid sixteenth notes, and falling fifths. The second theme consists of legato triplets in the right hand over octaves in the left. The theme is somewhat chromatic, with frequent accidentals. The third theme is mostly quarter and eighth notes with an irregular accompaniment. The exposition ends with a C major chord.

The development and recapitulation follow, varying and combining these themes before restating them, as is normal in sonata form.

=== II. Adagio ===
The second movement of the sonata is an adagio in F minor. It is the only piano sonata by Mozart with a slow movement in a minor key. While not marked as such, the movement is a siciliana, which Mozart would later revisit in the slow movement of his A major piano concerto (K.488). The mood of this movement is mournful and tragic, with the opening somewhat resembling a funeral march. Estonian composer Arvo Pärt's 1992 (rev. 2005) piece Mozart's Adagio reimagined the music from this movement in a work for violin, cello and piano.

=== III. Presto ===
The sonata ends with a presto (sonata form) in F major. It is relatively short for a presto, taking between two and three minutes to play.

== Sources ==
- Badura-Skoda, Eva (2004). "Aspects of Performance Practice". In Marshall, Robert L. (ed.). Eighteenth-Century Keyboard Music. Abingdon: Routledge. ISBN 1135887764.
- Beach, David (1994). "The Initial Movements of Mozart's Piano Sonatas K. 280 and K. 332: Some Striking Similarities". Intégral. 8: 125–146. JSTOR 40213957.
