= Piano Sonata No. 6 (Mozart) =

1775 composition by W. A. Mozart

- by W. A. Mozart
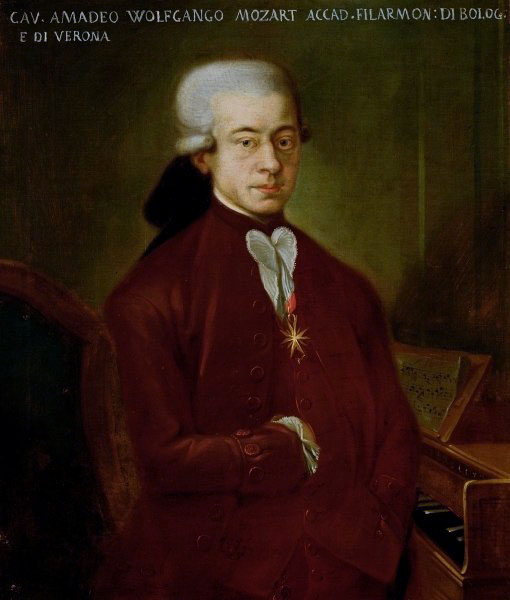
- The young composer, a 1777 copy of a lost painting
- Key: D major
- Catalogue: K. 284/205b
- Composed: 1775
- Dedication: Baron von Dürnitz
- Movements: 3 (Allegro, Rondeau en polonaise, Tema con variazione)
- Scoring: Solo piano

Wolfgang Amadeus Mozart's Piano Sonata No. 6 in D major, K. 284/205b, is a piano sonata composed in 1775. It has three movements:

1. Allegro D major, 4/4
2. Rondeau en polonaise, Andante A major, 3/4
3. (Andante) D major, 2/2

A typical performance takes about 20 to 25 minutes.

This piano sonata is the last of the sonatas that Mozart composed in Munich. The piece is subtitled "Dürnitz", as it was written for Baron von Dürnitz, an amateur bassoonist and keyboard-player, who failed to pay for the work. The work was written during Mozart's stay in Munich from December 1774 to March 1775 for the production of La finta giardiniera. It is the only one of Mozart's six Munich piano sonatas to be published in his lifetime, ten years later.

The autograph and the first edition of the sonata have numerous inconsistencies.

== Music ==
=== I. Allegro ===
A first version of the beginning of the first movement, written on one and a half pages, was abandoned by Mozart. On the same page, he started anew to write the final version underneath. The thematic material of this opening movement (and to a lesser degree also that of the following movements) is laid out on a more ample, nearly orchestral scale, a departure from the intimacy of the early sonatas. The tremolo effect in measures 13-16 and the unison announcements of the first subject read very much like a piano reduction of an orchestral tutti. The second subject, a supple melodic line, unaccompanied in its opening bar, incorporates a descending chain of first inversions, a favourite harmonic formula of the baroque and classical periods. (There are analogous passages in the subsidiary themes in Gluck's overture Iphigénie en Tauride and the first movements of J. S. Bach's Italian Concerto). This functions as a solo passage in contrast to the ensuing tutti entries in m.30. The development moves through a circle of minor keys before the recapitulation begins in measure 72.

=== II. Rondeau en polonaise ===
Mozart called the second movement a "Rondeau en Polonaise" (Rondo in the style of a Polonaise), and it is hence a dance. The opening four measures form a kind of dialogue (like the theme of the first movement of the preceding G Major Sonata), and Mozart subjects them to felicitous counter-statement, heightened by his meticulous dynamic markings.

=== III. Tema con variazione ===
The last movement of the sonata is a theme followed by twelve variations, which, up to the tenth variation, has the character of a gavotte. The theme is marked 'Andante' in the first edition (published during Mozart's lifetime), but has no indication in the autograph. The theme and the first eleven variations are in cut time, with the first 10 in the tempo of the theme. The eleventh variation is marked Adagio cantabile in the first edition and the autograph. The twelfth and final variation is marked Allegro in the first edition only and is in 3/4 time. All variations, including the theme, except for the seventh are in D major; with the seventh being the minor mode variation, as it's the parallel minor.

This movement shows Mozart's special gift for writing variations at its most brilliant. The superficial impression of a diffuse form does not stand up to a closer inspection: it would not be at all easy to omit one of the twelve variations, or to add an extra one. The eleventh variation is of special interest to Mozart scholars, for it gives us some insights into his concept of impromptu ornamentation. The autograph is only modestly ornamented, and Mozart presumably embellished it in performance as his fancy dictated. But a richly ornamented version survived in the first edition, and this embellished version is most likely Mozart's own work.
