= Piano Sonata No. 8 (Mozart) =

1778 composition by W. A. Mozart

- by W. A. Mozart
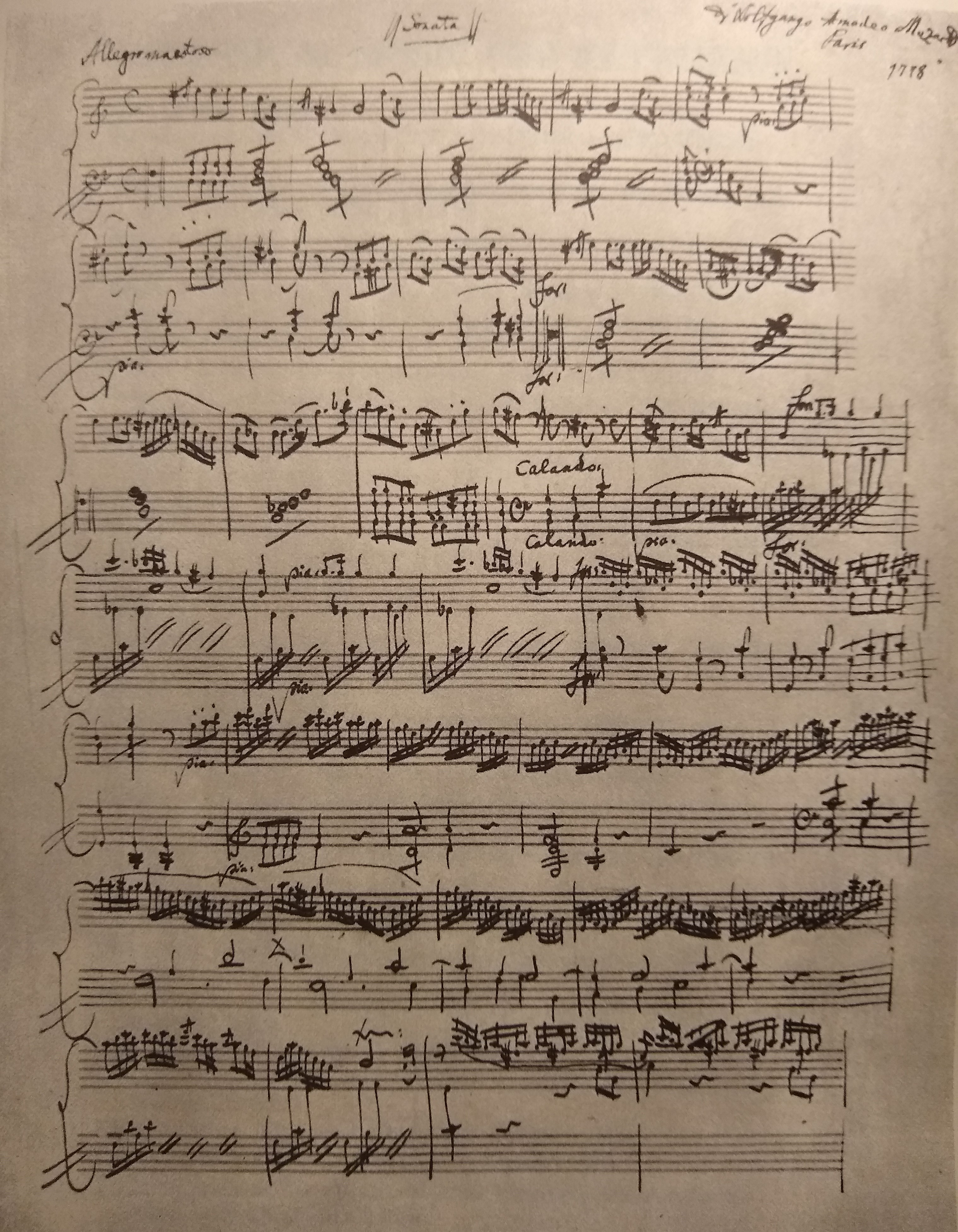
- First page of the autograph
- Key: A minor
- Catalogue: K. 310/300d
- Style: Classical period
- Composed: 1778
- Movements: Three (Allegro maestoso, Andante cantabile con espressione, Presto)

Wolfgang Amadeus Mozart's Piano Sonata No. 8 in A minor, K. 310/300d, was written in 1778. The sonata is the first of only two Mozart piano sonatas in a minor key (the other being No. 14 in C minor, K. 457). It was composed in the summer of 1778 around the time of his mother's death, one of the most tragic times of his life.

The autograph manuscript of the sonata is preserved in the Morgan Library & Museum.

== Background ==
Little is known about the precise circumstances surrounding the composition of the sonata; unlike the earlier Sonata in C major, K. 309/284b, it was little mentioned in his correspondence. The surviving manuscript was written using the same type of paper used for the Symphony No. 31 in D major, K. 297/300a, which Mozart purchased while in Paris.

The sonata is a rare minor key composition in Mozart's catalogue. Composed alongside the Violin Sonata No. 21 in E minor, K. 304/300c, it has been suggested that the sudden death of Mozart's mother may have led to the more sombre mood found in these pieces.

== Structure ==
I. Allegro maestoso

II. Andante cantabile con espressione

III. Presto
Performed by Randolph Hokanson

The composition, which typically takes around 22 minutes to perform, is in three movements:

1. Allegro maestoso, 4/4
2. Andante cantabile con espressione, F major, 3/4
3. Presto, 2/4

== Bibliography ==
- Anderson, Keith (1990). Mozart: Piano Sonatas, Vol. 1 (CD). Naxos Records. 8.550445.
- Irving, John (1997). Mozart's Piano Sonatas: Contexts, Sources, Style. Cambridge University Press. ISBN 0-521-49631-4.
- Zaslaw, Neal; Cowdery, William, eds. (1990). The Compleat Mozart: A Guide to the Musical Works of Wolfgang Amadeus Mozart. New York and London: W. W. Norton & Company. ISBN 978-0-393-02886-7.
