= Glenn Gould discography =

External audio
- You may hear Glenn Gould performing Ludwig van Beethoven's Piano Concerto No.2 in B-flat major, Op. 19 Here on archive.org

The following is a chronological list of the major-label studio recordings made by the Canadian classical pianist Glenn Gould. In his lifetime, the vast majority of Gould's albums were published by Columbia Masterworks (later CBS Masterworks). In 1988, Sony purchased CBS Records Group, and Sony Classical Records reissued dozens of albums over at least a decade as the "Glenn Gould Edition", which included previously unreleased material. After the Glenn Gould Edition, Sony has released many other albums of the same recordings in various guises. In 2015, Sony Classical released an 81-CD remastered boxed set, The Complete Columbia Album Collection.

Some live recordings or radio broadcasts have been released by small labels or the Canadian Broadcasting Corporation, with very little live performance ever published by Columbia or Sony. (Gould, of course, gave up concert performance early, in 1964.)

Gould also has an extensive bibliography of television and radio performance, documentary, and music discussion.

== Columbia Masterworks/CBS Masterworks: 1956–1984 ==
This Columbia Masterworks discography is believed to be complete.

Year of Issue	Title	Recorded	Label, serial number
1956	Bach: The Goldberg Variations: Goldberg Variations, BWV 988	June 10–16, 1955 in CBS 30th Street Studio, New York City	Columbia Masterworks, ML 5060
1956	Beethoven: Piano Sonatas Nos. 30–32: Piano Sonata No. 30 in E major, Op. 109; Piano Sonata No. 31 in A-flat major, Op. 110; Piano Sonata No. 32 in C minor, Op. 111	June 20–29, 1956 in CBS 30th Street Studio, New York City	Columbia Masterworks, ML 5130
1957	Bach: Concerto No. 1 in D minor, BWV 1052 & Beethoven: Concerto No. 2 in B-flat major, Op. 19: Bach: Concerto for Harpsichord, Strings, and Basso Continuo No. 1 in D minor, BWV 1052; Beethoven: Piano Concerto No. 2 in B-flat major, Op. 19; (with Leonard Bernstein & Columbia Symphony Orchestra)	Bach: April 11 & 30, 1957; Beethoven: April 9–11, 1957; CBS 30th Street Studio, New York City	Columbia Masterworks, ML 5211
1957	Bach: Partitas Nos. 5 & 6; Fugues in F-sharp minor and E major: Partita No. 5 in G major, BWV 829; Partita No. 6 in E minor, BWV 830; The Well-Tempered Clavier, Book II: Fugue No. 9 in E major, BWV 878/2; The Well-Tempered Clavier, Book II: Fugue No. 14 in F-sharp minor, BWV 883/2	BWV 829 & 830: February 9 & 13–17, 1956 & July 29 & August 1, 1957; BWV 878/2, 883/2: July 29–August 1, 1957; CBS 30th Street Studio, New York City	Columbia Masterworks, ML 5186
1958	Haydn: Sonata No. 3 in E-flat major; Mozart: Sonata No. 10 in C major, K. 330; Fantasia and Fugue in C major, K. 394: Haydn: Piano Sonata No. 59 in E-flat major, Hob. XVI/49; Mozart: Piano Sonata No. 10 in C major, K. 330; Mozart: Fantasia and Fugue in C major, K. 394		Columbia Masterworks, ML 5274
1958	Beethoven: Piano Concerto No. 1 in C major, Op. 15 & Bach: Piano Concerto No. 5 in F minor: Bach: Concerto for Harpsichord, Strings, and Basso Continuo No. 5 in F minor, BWV 1056; Beethoven: Piano Concerto No. 1 in C major, Op. 15; (with Vladimir Golschmann & Columbia Symphony Orchestra)	Bach: May 1, 1958; Beethoven: April 29–30 and July 1, 1958; CBS 30th Street Studio, New York City	Columbia Masterworks, ML 5298, MS 6017
1959	Berg: Sonata for Piano, Op. 1; Schoenberg: Three Piano Pieces, Op. 11; Krenek: Sonata No. 3 for Piano, Op. 92, No. 4: Berg: Piano Sonata, Op. 1; Schoenberg: Drei Klavierstücke, Op. 11; Krenek: Piano Sonata No. 3, Op. 92, No. 4		Columbia Masterworks, ML 5336
1960	Beethoven: Piano Concerto No. 3 in C minor, Op. 37: Piano Concerto No. 3 in C minor, Op. 37; (with Leonard Bernstein & Columbia Symphony Orchestra)		Columbia Masterworks, ML 5418, MS 6096
1960	Gould: String Quartet No. 1: String Quartet in F minor, Op. 1; (performed by Symphonia Quartet)		Columbia Masterworks, ML 5578, MS 6178
1960	Bach: Italian Concerto in F major & Partita Nos. 1 & 2: Italian Concerto in F major, BWV 971; Partita No. 1 in B-flat major, BWV 825; Partita No. 2 in C minor, BWV 826	BWV 971: June 22–26, 1959; BWV 825: May 1 & 8 & September 22, 1959; BWV 826: June 22–23, 1959; CBS 30th Street Studio, New York City	Columbia Masterworks, ML 5472, MS 6141
1961	Brahms: 10 Intermezzi: Intermezzo in A major, Op. 76, No. 6; Intermezzo in A minor, Op. 76, No. 7; Intermezzo in E major, Op. 116, No. 4; Intermezzo in E-flat major, Op. 117, No. 1; Intermezzo in B-flat minor, Op. 117, No. 2; Intermezzo in C-sharp minor, Op. 117, No. 3; Intermezzo in A minor, Op. 118, No. 1; Intermezzo in A major, Op. 118, No. 2; Intermezzo in E-flat minor, Op. 118, No. 6; Intermezzo in B minor, Op. 119, No. 1		Columbia Masterworks, ML 5637, MS 6237
1961	Beethoven: Piano Concerto No. 4 in G major, Op. 58: Piano Concerto No. 4 in G major, Op. 58; (with Leonard Bernstein & New York Philharmonic)		Columbia Masterworks, ML 5662, MS 6262
1962	Mozart: Piano Concerto No. 24 in C minor, K. 491 & Schoenberg: Piano Concerto, Op. 42: Mozart: Piano Concerto No. 24 in C minor, K. 491 (with Walter Susskind & CBC Symphony Orchestra); Schoenberg: Piano Concerto, Op. 42 (with Robert Craft & CBC Symphony Orchestra)		Columbia Masterworks, ML 5739, MS 6339
1962	Strauss: Enoch Arden (Tennyson), Op. 38: Enoch Arden, Op. 38; (with Claude Rains, speaker)		Columbia Masterworks, ML 5741, MS 6341
1962	Bach: The Art of the Fugue, BWV 1080 Volume I Fugues 1–9: The Art of Fugue, BWV 1080: Contrapuncti 1–9, BWV 1080, 1–9; (played on organ)	January 31–February 2, 4 & 21, 1962 in All Saints’ Kingsway Anglican Church, Toronto	Columbia Masterworks, ML 5738, MS 6338
1963	Bach: The Well-Tempered Clavier, Book I, Volume 1, BWV 846–853: The Well-Tempered Clavier, Book I, Preludes and Fugues 1–8; Prelude and Fugue No. 1 in C major, BWV 846; Prelude and Fugue No. 2 in C minor, BWV 847; Prelude and Fugue No. 3 in C-sharp major, BWV 848; Prelude and Fugue No. 4 in C-sharp minor, BWV 849; Prelude and Fugue No. 5 in D major, BWV 850; Prelude and Fugue No. 6 in D minor, BWV 851; Prelude and Fugue No. 7 in E-flat major, BWV 852; Prelude in E-flat minor and Fugue in D-sharp minor No. 8, BWV 853	BWV 846 & 847: June 7, September 7 & 20–21, 1962; BWV 848: June 7–8 & September 20, 1962; BWV 849 & 850: June 14 & September 21–22, 1962; BWV 851: June 14, 1962; BWV 852 & 853: September 20, 1962; CBS 30th Street Studio, New York City	Columbia Masterworks, ML 5739, MS 6339
1963	Bach: Partitas Nos. 3 & 4: Partita No. 3 in A minor, BWV 827; Partita No. 4 in D major, BWV 828; Toccata in E minor, BWV 914	BWV 827: October 18–19, 1962; BWV 828: December 11–12, 1962 & March 19–20 & April 8, 1963; BWV 914: April 8, 1963; CBS 30th Street Studio, New York City	Columbia Masterworks, ML 5898, MS 6498
1964	Bach: The Well-Tempered Clavier, Book I, Volume 2, BWV 854–861: The Well-Tempered Clavier, Book I, Preludes and Fugues 9–16; Prelude and Fugue No. 9 in E major, BWV 854; Prelude and Fugue No. 10 in E minor, BWV 855; Prelude and Fugue No. 11 in F major, BWV 856; Prelude and Fugue No. 12 in F minor, BWV 857; Prelude and Fugue No. 13 in F-sharp major, BWV 858; Prelude and Fugue No. 14 in F-sharp minor, BWV 859; Prelude and Fugue No. 15 in G major, BWV 860; Prelude and Fugue No. 16 in G minor, BWV 861	BWV 854: April 9, June 18, 20 & 29–30, 1963; BWV 855 & 861: June 18–20, 25 & 30, 1963; BWV 856: April 9, 1963; BWV 857: June 18 & 25, 1963; BWV 858: June 18, 1963; BWV 859: August 29, 1963; BWV 860: August 29–30, 1963; CBS 30th Street Studio, New York City	Columbia Masterworks, ML 5938, MS 6538
1964	Bach: Two and Three Part Inventions, BWV 772–801 (Inventions & Sinfonias): Inventions and Sinfonias, BWV 772–801	March 18–19, 1964 in CBS 30th Street Studio, New York City	Columbia Masterworks, ML 6022, MS 6622
1965	Beethoven: Sonatas No. 5–7, Op. 10, No. 1–3: Piano Sonata No. 5 in C minor, Op. 10, No. 1; Piano Sonata No. 6 in F major, Op. 10, No. 2; Piano Sonata No. 7 in D major, Op. 10, No. 3		Columbia Masterworks, ML 6086, MS 6686
1965	Bach: The Well-Tempered Clavier, Book I, Volume 3, BWV 862–869: The Well-Tempered Clavier, Book I, Preludes and Fugues 17–24; Prelude and Fugue No. 17 in A-flat major, BWV 862; Prelude and Fugue No. 18 in G-sharp minor, BWV 863; Prelude and Fugue No. 19 in A major, BWV 864; Prelude and Fugue No. 20 in A minor, BWV 865; Prelude and Fugue No. 21 in B-flat major, BWV 866; Prelude and Fugue No. 22 in B-flat minor, BWV 867; Prelude and Fugue No. 23 in B major, BWV 868; Prelude and Fugue No. 24 in B minor, BWV 869	BWV 862: February 23, March 5, 17 & 31 & April 23, 1965; BWV 863: March 31 & August 9, 1965; BWV 864: March 17 & 31 & April 23, 1965; BWV 865: March 17, 1965; BWV 866: February 23 & March 5, 1965; BWV 867: March 31 & April 23, 1965; BWV 868: April 23, 1965; BWV 869: June 1 & August 9, 1965; CBS 30th Street Studio, New York City	Columbia Masterworks, ML 6176, MS 6776
1966	The Music of Arnold Schoenberg, Vol. IV: 2 Gesänge for baritone, Op. 1 (with Donald Gramm, bass-baritone); Vier Lieder, Op. 2 (with Ellen Faull, soprano); Drei Klavierstücke, Op. 11 (originally released in 1959 on ML 5336); Das Buch der hängenden Gärten, Op. 15 (with Helen Vanni, mezzo-soprano); Sechs kleine Klavierstücke, Op. 19; 5 Stücke for Piano, Op. 23; Suite for Piano, Op. 25; Zwei Klavierstücke, Op. 33		Columbia Masterworks, M2L 336
1966	Beethoven: Piano Concerto No. 5 in E-flat major, Op. 73, "Emperor": Piano Concerto No. 5 in E-flat major, Op. 73, "Emperor"; (with Leopold Stokowski & American Symphony Orchestra)		Columbia Masterworks, ML 6288, MS 6888
1967	Beethoven: Sonatas for Piano No. 8–10, Op. 13 "Pathétique", Op. 14, No. 1 & 2: Piano Sonata No. 8 in C minor, Op. 13 "Pathétique"; Piano Sonata No. 9 in E major, Op. 14, No. 1; Piano Sonata No. 10 in G major, Op. 14, No. 2		Columbia Masterworks, ML 6345, MS 6945
1967	Bach: Three Keyboard Concertos, BWV 1054, 1056 & 1058: Concerto for Harpsichord, Strings, and Basso Continuo No. 3 in D major, BWV 1054; Concerto for Harpsichord, Strings, and Basso Continuo No. 5 in F minor, BWV 1056 (originally released in 1958 on ML 5298/MS 6017); Concerto for Harpsichord, Strings, and Basso Continuo No. 7 in G minor, BWV 1058; (with Vladimir Golschmann & Columbia Symphony Orchestra)	BWV 1054: May 2, 1967; BWV 1056: May 1, 1958; BWV 1058: May 4, 1967; CBS 30th Street Studio, New York City	Columbia Masterworks, ML 6401
1967	Canadian Music in the XXth Century: Morawetz: Fantasy in D minor; Anhalt: Fantasia; Hétu: Variations		CBS Masterworks, 32 11 0045/32 11 0046
1967	The Music of Arnold Schoenberg, Vol. VII: Trio for Violin, Viola and Cello, Opus 45 (performed by members of the Juilliard Quartet); Ode to Napoleon Buonaparte, Opus 41 (with Juilliard String Quartet/John Horton, speaker); Variations on a Recitative, Opus 40 (performed by Marilyn Mason, organ); Fantasy for Violin and Piano, Opus 47 (with Israel Baker, violin); Theme and Variations, Opus 43B (performed by Eugene Ormandy/Philadelphia Orchestra)		Columbia Masterworks, M2L 367
1968	The Mozart Piano Sonatas, Vol. 1: Piano Sonata No. 1 in C major, K. 279; Piano Sonata No. 2 in F major, K. 280; Piano Sonata No. 3 in B-flat major, K. 281; Piano Sonata No. 4 in E-flat major, K. 282; Piano Sonata No. 5 in G major, K. 283		Columbia Masterworks, MS 7097
1968	Bach: The Well-Tempered Clavier, Book II, Volume I, BWV 870–877: The Well-Tempered Clavier, Book II, Preludes and Fugues 1–8; Prelude and Fugue No. 1 in C major, BWV 870; Prelude and Fugue No. 2 in C minor, BWV 871; Prelude and Fugue No. 3 in C-sharp major, BWV 872; Prelude and Fugue No. 4 in C-sharp minor, BWV 873; Prelude and Fugue No. 5 in D major, BWV 874; Prelude and Fugue No. 6 in D minor, BWV 875; Prelude and Fugue No. 7 in E-flat major, BWV 876; Prelude and Fugue No. 8 in D-sharp minor, BWV 877	BWV 870–872: August 8, 1966 & February 20, 1967; BWV 873 & 874: January 24, 1967; BWV 875: August 8, 1966; BWV 876: August 8, 1966 & January 24 & February 20, 1967; BWV 877: February 20, 1967; CBS 30th Street Studio, New York City	Columbia Masterworks, MS 7099
1968	Bach: The Goldberg Variations	June 10–16, 1955 in CBS 30th Street Studio, New York City; rechanneled for stereo in 1968	Columbia Masterworks, MS 7096
1968	Glenn Gould: Concert Dropout – In Conversation with John McClure: The Concert Is Dead; The Only Excuse For Recording Is To Do It Differently; The Great Get-Sibelius Plot Exposed; A Live Audience Is A Great Liability; Petula Clark's Songs Are In The Post-Mendelssohn Tradition; Why I Sing Along; Electronic Music Is The Future; (John McClure, interviewer)		Columbia Masterworks, BS 15 (bonus disc released with MS 7095)
1968	Beethoven: Symphony No. 5 in C minor, Op. 67 (Transcribed for Piano by Franz Liszt): Beethoven/Liszt: Symphony No. 5 in C minor, Op. 67		Columbia Masterworks, MS 7095
1969	Scriabin: Sonata No. 3 in F-sharp minor, Op. 23 & Prokofiev: Sonata No. 7 in B-flat major, Op. 83: Scriabin: Piano Sonata No. 3 in F-sharp minor, Op. 23; Prokofiev: Piano Sonata No. 7 in B-flat major, Op. 83		Columbia Masterworks, MS 7173
1969	The Mozart Piano Sonatas, Vol. 2: Piano Sonata No. 6 in D major, K. 284; Piano Sonata No. 7 C major, K. 309; Piano Sonata No. 9 in D major, K. 311		Columbia Masterworks, MS 7274
1969	Bach: Keyboard Concertos, Vol. II: Concerto for Harpsichord, Strings, and Basso Continuo No. 2 in E major, BWV 1053; Concerto for Harpsichord, Strings, and Basso Continuo No. 4 in A major, BWV 1055; (with Vladimir Golschmann & Columbia Symphony Orchestra)	BWV 1053: February 10 & 12, 1969; BWV 1055: February 11–12, 1969; CBS 30th Street Studio, New York City	Columbia Masterworks, MS 7294
1969	Schumann: Piano Quintet in E Flat; Piano Quartet in E Flat; The Three String Quartets: Quartet in A Minor, Op. 41, No. 1 (performed by Juilliard String Quartet); Quartet in F Major, Op. 41, No. 2 (performed by Juilliard String Quartet); Quartet in A Major, Op. 41, No. 3 (Performed by Juilliard String Quartet); Quintet for Piano and Strings in E-flat Major, Op. 44 (performed by Leonard Bernstein, piano/Juilliard String Quartet); Quartet for Piano and Strings in E-flat Major, Op. 47 (with members of the Juilliard String Quartet)		Columbia Masterworks, D3S 806
1970	Glenn Gould Plays Beethoven Sonatas Nos. 8, 14 & 23: Piano Sonata No. 8 in C minor, Op. 13 "Pathétique"; Piano Sonata No. 14 in C-sharp minor, Op. 27, No. 2 "Moonlight"; Piano Sonata No. 23 in F minor, Op. 57 "Appassionata"		Columbia Masterworks, MS 7413
1970	Bach: The Well-Tempered Clavier, Book II, Volume II, BWV 878–885: The Well-Tempered Clavier, Book II, Preludes and Fugues 9–16; Prelude and Fugue No. 9 in E major, BWV 878; Prelude and Fugue No. 10 in E minor, BWV 879; Prelude and Fugue No. 11 in F major, BWV 880; Prelude and Fugue No. 12 in F minor, BWV 881; Prelude and Fugue No. 13 in F-sharp major, BWV 882; Prelude and Fugue No. 14 in F-sharp minor, BWV 883; Prelude and Fugue No. 15 in G major, BWV 884; Prelude and Fugue No. 16 in G minor, BWV 885	BWV 878: September 11–12 & December 3–4, 1969; BWV 879 & 880: December 18, 1969; BWV 881, 882, 884: December 3–4, 1969; BWV 883: September 11–12 & December 18, 1969; BWV 885: December 17, 1969; CBS 30th Street Studio, New York City	Columbia Masterworks, MS 7409
1970	Beethoven: Variations for Piano: 32 Variations on an Original Theme in C minor; Six Variations on a Theme in F major, Op. 34; Eroica Variations, Op. 35		Columbia Masterworks, M 30080
1971	Bach: The Well-Tempered Clavier, Book II, Volume III, BWV 886–893: The Well-Tempered Clavier, Book II, Preludes and Fugues 17–24; Prelude and Fugue No. 17 in A-flat major, BWV 886; Prelude and Fugue No. 18 in G-sharp minor, BWV 887; Prelude and Fugue No. 19 in A major, BWV 888; Prelude and Fugue No. 20 in A minor, BWV 889; Prelude and Fugue No. 21 in B-flat major, BWV 890; Prelude and Fugue No. 22 in B-flat minor, BWV 891; Prelude and Fugue No. 23 in B major, BWV 892; Prelude and Fugue No. 24 in B minor, BWV 893	BWV 886–887, 889–893: January 10–11, 24 & 31, 1971; BWV 888: September 11, 1969 & January 10–11, 24 & 31, 1971; CBS 30th Street Studio, New York City	Columbia Masterworks, MS 30537
1971	A Consort of Musicke Bye William Byrde and Orlando Gibbons: Byrd: The Firste Pavian; The Galliarde to the Firste Pavian; Pavana the Sixte Kinbrugh Goodd; The Galliarde to the Sixte Pavian; Hughe Ashtons Grownde: A Voluntarie; Sellingers Rownde; Gibbons: "Lord Of Salisbury" Pavan And Galliard; Allemande (Italian Ground); Fantasy in C major		Columbia Masterworks, M 30825
1972	The Mozart Piano Sonatas, Vol. 3: Piano Sonata No. 8 in A minor, K. 310; Piano Sonata No. 10 in C major, K. 330; Piano Sonata No. 12 in F major, K. 332; Piano Sonata No. 13 in B-flat major, K. 333		Columbia Masterworks, M 31073
1972	Music from Kurt Vonnegut's Slaughterhouse-Five: Keyboard concerto No. 5; Variations 18 & 25 from The Goldberg Variations; Brandenburg Concerto No. 4 in G major, BWV 1049; Concerto for Harpsichord, Strings, and Basso Continuo No. 3 in D major, BWV 1054; Fantasia super: Komm, Heiliger Geist, Herre Gott, BWV 651; (OST Slaughterhouse-Five, all tracks previously released)		Columbia Masterworks, S 31333
1972	Schoenberg: Complete Songs for Voice and Piano, Vol. 1: 2 Gesänge for baritone, Op. 1 (with Donald Gramm, bass-baritone); Vier Lieder, Op. 2 (with Ellen Faull, soprano); Das Buch der hängenden Gärten, Op. 15 (with Helen Vanni, mezzo-soprano); (all tracks previously released on M2S 736, 1966)		Columbia Masterworks, M 31311
1972	Schoenberg: Complete Songs for Voice and Piano, Vol. 2: Six Songs, Op. 3; Eight Songs, Op. 6; Two Ballads, Op. 12; Two Songs, Op. 14; Three Songs, Op. 48; Two Songs, Op. posth.; (with Donald Gramm, bass-baritone; Cornelius Opthof, baritone and Helen Vanni, mezzo-soprano)		Columbia Masterworks, M 31312
1972	Händel: Suites for the Harpsichord: Suite No. 1 in A major, HWV 426; Suite No. 2 in F major, HWV 427; Suite No. 3 in D minor, HWV 428; Suite No. 4 in E minor, HWV 429; (performed on harpsichord)		Columbia Masterworks, M 31512
1973	Glenn Gould's First Recordings of Grieg and Bizet: Grieg: Piano Sonata; Bizet: Premier Nocturne; Variations Chromatiques		Columbia Masterworks, M 32040
1973	Bach: The French Suites, Vol. 1, Nos. 1–4: French Suite No. 1 in D minor, BWV 812; French Suite No. 2 in C minor, BWV 813; French Suite No. 3 in B minor, BWV 814; French Suite No. 4 in E-flat major, BWV 815	BWV 812: November 15–16, 1972; BWV 813: November 5, 1972; BWV 814: December 12 and 17, 1972; BWV 815: February 17, 1973; Eaton Auditorium, Toronto	Columbia Masterworks, M 32347
1973	Glenn Gould Plays Hindemith's Piano Sonatas 1–3: Piano Sonata No. 1 in A major; Piano Sonata No. 2 in G major; Piano Sonata No. 3 in B-flat major		CBS Masterworks, M 32350
1973	Glenn Gould Plays His Own Transcriptions of Wagner Orchestral Showpieces: Prelude to Act I (from Die Meistersinger); "Dawn" and "Siegfried's Rhine Journey" (from Götterdämmerung); Siegfried Idyll	1973 in Eaton Auditorium, Toronto	CBS Masterworks, M 32351
1973	The Mozart Piano Sonatas, Vol. 4: Piano Sonata No. 11 in A major, K. 331; Piano Sonata No. 15 in F major, K. 533; Piano Sonata No. 16 in C major, K. 545; Fantasia No. 3 in D minor, K. 397		Columbia Masterworks, M 32348
1973	Beethoven: Piano Sonatas, Op. 31 Complete: Piano Sonata No. 16 in G major, Op. 31, No. 1; Piano Sonata No. 17 in D minor, Op. 31, No. 2 "The Tempest"; Piano Sonata No. 18 in E-flat major, Op. 31, No. 3 "The Hunt"		Columbia Masterworks, M 32349
1974	Bach: The French Suites, Vol. 2, Nos. 5 and 6 & Overture in the French Style: French Suite No. 5 in G major, BWV 816; French Suite No. 6 in E major, BWV 817; Overture in the French style, BWV 831	BWV 816: February 27–28 & May 23, 1971 & February 17, 1973; BWV 817: March 13–14 & May 23, 1971; BWV 831: January 10–11, 24 & 31 & February 27–28, 1971 & November 5, 1973; Eaton Auditorium, Toronto	CBS Masterworks, M 32853
1974	Bach: The Three Sonatas for Viola da Gamba & Harpsichord: Sonata for Viola da Gamba and Harpsichord No. 1 in G major, BWV 1027; Sonata for Viola da Gamba and Harpsichord No. 2 in D major, BWV 1028; Sonata for Viola da Gamba and Harpsichord No. 3 in G minor, BWV 1029; (with Leonard Rose, cello)	BWV 1027: May 28–29, 1974; BWV 1028: December 18–19, 1973; BWV 1029: December 16–17, 1973; Eaton Auditorium, Toronto	CBS Masterworks, M 32934
1975	Beethoven: Bagatelles, Op. 33 & Op. 126: Bagatelles, Op. 33; Bagatelles, Op. 126		CBS Masterworks, M 33265
1975	The Mozart Piano Sonatas, Vol. 5: Piano Sonata No. 14 in C minor, K. 457; Piano Sonata No. 17 in B-flat major, K. 570; Piano Sonata No. 18 in D major, K. 576; Fantasia No. 4 in C minor, K. 475	June 23, September 7 & November 9, 1974 in CBS 30th Street Studio, New York City	Columbia Masterworks, M 33515
1976	Hindemith: The Complete Sonatas For Brass & Piano: Sonata in F for French Horn and Piano; Sonata for Bass Tuba and Piano; Sonata for Trumpet and Piano; Sonata in E-flat for Alto Horn and Piano; Sonata for Trombone and Piano; (with members of the Philadelphia Brass Ensemble)		CBS Masterworks, M2 33971
1976	Bach: The Six Sonatas for Violin and Harpsichord: Sonata for Violin and Harpsichord No. 1 in B minor, BWV 1014; Sonata for Violin and Harpsichord No. 2 in A major, BWV 1015; Sonata for Violin and Harpsichord No. 3 in E major, BWV 1016; Sonata for Violin and Harpsichord No. 4 in C minor, BWV 1017; Sonata for Violin and Harpsichord No. 5 in F minor, BWV 1018; Sonata for Violin and Harpsichord No. 6 in G major, BWV 1019; (with Jaime Laredo, violin)	BWV 1014 & 1015: February 1 & 3, 1975; BWV 1016: November 23–24, 1975 & January 9–11, 1976; BWV 1017: November 23–24, 1975; BWV 1018 & 1019: January 9–11, 1976; Eaton Auditorium, Toronto	CBS Masterworks, M2 34226
1977	Bach: The English Suites, BWV 806–811: English Suite No. 1 in A major, BWV 806; English Suite No. 2 in A minor, BWV 807; English Suite No. 3 in G minor, BWV 808; English Suite No. 4 in F major, BWV 809; English Suite No. 5 in E minor, BWV 810; English Suite No. 6 in D minor, BWV 811	BWV 806: March 11 & November 4, 1973; BWV 807: May 23, 1971; BWV 808: June 21–22, 1974; BWV 809 & 810: December 14–15, 1974 & May 23–24, 1976; BWV 811: October 10–11, 1975 & May 23–24, 1976; Eaton Auditorium, Toronto	CBS Masterworks, M2 34578
1977	Glenn Gould Plays Sibelius: Sonatine No. 1 for Piano in E major, Op. 67; Sonatine No. 2 for Piano in E major, Op. 67; Sonatine No. 3 for Piano in B minor, Op. 67; Kyllikki, Op. 41		CBS Masterworks, M 34555
1978	Hindemith: Das Marienleben for Soprano & Piano: Das Marienleben; (with Roxolana Roslak, soprano)		CBS Masterworks, M2 34597
1979	Bach: The Toccatas, Vol. 1: Toccata in F-sharp minor, BWV 910; Toccata in D major, BWV 912; Toccata in D minor, BWV 913	BWV 910: October 31–November 1, 1976; BWV 912: October 16–17 & November 1, 1976; BWV 913: October 16–17, 1976; Eaton Auditorium, Toronto	CBS Masterworks, M 35144
1980	Bach: The Toccatas, Vol. 2: Toccata in C minor, BWV 911; Toccata in E minor, BWV 914; Toccata in G minor, BWV 915; Toccata in G major, BWV 916	BWV 911: May 15–16, 1979; BWV 914 & 916: May 15, 1979; BWV 915: June 12, 1979; Eaton Auditorium, Toronto	CBS Masterworks, M 35831
1980	Bach: Preludes, Fughettas & Fugues: Prelude and Fugue in A minor, BWV 895; Prelude and Fughetta in D minor, BWV 899; Prelude and Fugue in E minor, BWV 900; Prelude and Fughetta in G major, BWV 902 & Prelude in G major, 902a; 9 Little Preludes, BWV 924–932 (excerpts); Prelude in C major, BWV 924; Prelude in D major, BWV 925; Prelude in D minor, BWV 926; Prelude in F major, BWV 927; Prelude in F major, BWV 928; Prelude in G minor, BWV 930; 6 Little Preludes, BWV 933–938; Prelude in C major, BWV 933; Prelude in C minor, BWV 934; Prelude in D minor, BWV 935; Prelude in D major, BWV 936; Prelude in E major, BWV 937; Prelude in E minor, BWV 938; Three Little Fugues from "Klavierbüchlein für Wilhelm Friedemann Bach"; Fugue in C major, BWV 952; Fugue in C major, BWV 953; Fughetta in C minor, BWV 961	BWV 895, 899, 900, 902 & 902a, 935–938, 952–953, 961: October 10, 1979; BWV 924–928, 930: January 20, 1980; BWV 933–934: October 10, 1979 & January 20 & February 2, 1980; Eaton Auditorium, Toronto	CBS Masterworks, M 35891
1980	Beethoven: Sonatas Op. 28 (Pastoral); Op. 2, Nos. 1, 2 & 3: Piano Sonata No. 1 in F minor, Op. 2, No. 1; Piano Sonata No. 2 in A major, Op. 2, No. 2; Piano Sonata No. 3 in C major, Op. 2, No. 3; Piano Sonata No. 15 in D major, Op. 28 "Pastoral"		CBS Masterworks, M2 35911
1980	The Glenn Gould Silver Jubilee Album: Scarlatti: Sonatas, L 463, 413, and 486; C.P.E. Bach: Württemberg Sonata No. 1; Gould: So You Want to Write A Fugue? (performed by Elizabeth Benson-Guy, soprano/Anita Darian, contralto/Charles Bressler, tenor/Donald Gramm, baritone/Juilliard String Quartet/Vladimir Golschmann, conductor); Scriabin: Two Pieces, Op. 57; Strauss: Ophelia-Lieder (with Elisabeth Schwarzkopf, soprano); Beethoven/Liszt: Pastoral Symphony, First Movement; A Glenn Gould Fantasy (with Margaret Pacsu)		CBS Masterworks M2X 35914
1982	Haydn: The Six Last Sonatas: Piano Sonata No. 56 in D major, Hob. XVI/42; Piano Sonata No. 58 in C major, Hob. XVI/48; Piano Sonata No. 59 in E-flat major, Hob. XVI/49; Piano Sonata No. 60 in C major, Hob. XVI/50; Piano Sonata No. 61 in D major, Hob. XVI/51; Piano Sonata No. 62 in E-flat major, Hob. XVI/52		CBS Masterworks, I2M 36947
1982	Bach: The Goldberg Variations (1981 Digital Recording): Goldberg Variations, BWV 988	April 22–25, May 5, 19 & 29, 1981 in CBS 30th Street Studio, New York City	CBS Masterworks, IM 37779
1983	Brahms: Ballades, Op. 10 & Rhapsodies, Op. 79: Ballades, Op. 10; Rhapsodies, Op. 79	Ballades: February 8–10, 1982; Rhapsodies: June 30–July 1, 1982; RCA's Studio A, New York City	CBS Masterworks, IM 37800
1983	Beethoven: Sonatas No. 12, Op. 26 & No. 13, Op. 27, No. 1: Piano Sonata No. 12 in A-flat major, Op. 26 "Funeral March"; Piano Sonata No. 13 in E-flat major, Op. 27, No. 1 "Quasi una fantasia"		CBS Masterworks, M 37831
1984	Richard Strauss: Sonata, Op. 5; 5 Piano Pieces, Op. 3: Fünf Klavierstücke, Op. 3; Piano Sonata in B minor, Op. 5	September 1–3, 1982 in RCA's Studio A in New York (Sonata op.5); April 23 & 6 August 6, 1979 in Old St.Lawrence Hall in Toronto (Piano Pieces 1–4); September 5, 1979 in Eaton's Auditorium in Toronto (Piano Piece 5)	CBS Masterworks, IM 38659
1984	Glenn Gould Discusses His Performances of the "Goldberg Variations" with Tim Page		CBS Masterworks, CDN-70 (Bonus disc released with IM 37779)

== Sony Classical Records: 1990– ==
Year of Issue	Title	Recorded	Label, serial number
1990	Glenn Gould Conducts & Plays Wagner: Siegfried Idyll* (original version for 13 instruments): Glenn Gould, conductor; Prelude to Act I (from Die Meistersinger)**; "Dawn" and "Siegfried's Rhine Journey" (from Götterdämmerung)**; Siegfried Idyll**	* July 27–29 & September 8, 1982, St. Lawrence Hall, Toronto ** 1973, Eaton's Auditorium, Toronto (originally released in 1973 by Columbia Masterworks, M 32351)	Sony Classical, SK 46279
1993	Beethoven: Piano Sonatas, No. 24, Op. 78 "À Thérèse", No. 29, Op. 106 "Hammerklavier": Piano Sonata No. 24 in F-sharp major, Op. 78 "À Thérèse"; Piano Sonata No. 29 in B-flat major, Op. 106 "Hammerklavier"		Sony Classical, SMK 52645
1993	Schumann: Piano Quartet, Op. 47; Brahms: Piano Quintet Op. 34: Schumann: Quartet for Piano, Violin, Viola and Cello in E-flat major, Op. 47 (with members of the Juilliard String Quartet); Brahms: Quintet for Piano, 2 Violins, Viola and Cello in F minor, Op. 34 (with Montreal String Quartet)		Sony Classical, SMK 52684
1995	The Glenn Gould Edition: Chopin: Piano Sonata No. 3; Mendelssohn: Songs Without Words (selections from Op. 19, 30, 85); Scriabin: Piano Sonata No. 3; Scriabin: Piano Sonata No. 5; Scriabin: Feuillet d'album, Preludes (selections), 2 Morceaux, Op. 57; Prokofiev: Piano Sonata No. 7	1967–1972	Sony Classical, SM2K 52622
2002	A State of Wonder: The Complete Goldberg Variations, 1955 & 1981	* 3 discs: 1955 and 1981 recordings plus 1955 outtakes and Gould's final radio interview	Sony Classical, S3K 87703
