= Piano Sonata in G major =

Piano Sonata in G major may refer to:

- Piano Sonata No. 10 (Beethoven)
- Piano Sonata No. 16 (Beethoven)
- Piano Sonata No. 20 (Beethoven)
- Piano Sonata No. 25 (Beethoven)
- Sonatina in G major (attributed to Beethoven)
- Piano Sonata No. 2 (Hindemith)
- Piano Sonata No. 5 (Mozart)
- Piano Sonata in G major, D 894 (Schubert)
- Piano Sonata in G major (Tchaikovsky)
