= Prelude and Fugue in B major, BWV 892 =

Composition by J. S. Bach

Score, published by Franz Kroll (1820–1877), in Bach-Gesellschaft Ausgabe, pp. 192–197, Leipzig, 1866

Prelude and Fugue in B major, BWV 892, is the 23rd pair of prelude and fugue from Book II of The Well-Tempered Clavier by J. S. Bach, compiled between 1739 and 1744.

While Bach concluded the first volume with a Prelude and fugue in B minor (BWV 869), in compiling the second volume twenty years later, he placed a brief fugue in the style of a fughetta in the 24th and final position. Therefore, in the major key, for the 23rd diptych in B, he reserved a double fugue of even greater scope (104 measures, compared to 76 in the first book and nearly equal to the preceding one in B♭ minor).

The prelude that introduces it—comparable to the D minor and F♯ major preludes—is structured as a toccata. The fugue, in stile antico, is based on a subject presented across four voices from low to high.

The two volumes of The Well-Tempered Clavier are widely regarded by composers and educators as a benchmark. Originally circulated as manuscripts among musicians and published in the early 19th century, they transcend mere enjoyment for music lovers, having served since their creation as an essential resource for mastering keyboard technique and compositional artistry.

== Context ==
The Well-Tempered Clavier is regarded as one of the most-known works in classical music. It has been considered a benchmark by Joseph Haydn, Mozart, Beethoven, Robert Schumann, Frédéric Chopin, Richard Wagner, César Franck, Max Reger, Gabriel Fauré, Claude Debussy, Maurice Ravel, Igor Stravinsky, Charles Koechlin, and many others, both performers and admirers. Hans von Bülow saw it not only as a priceless monument but famously referred to it as the Old Testament of music, alongside Beethoven's thirty-two sonatas, which he called the New Testament.

The scores, unpublished during Bach's lifetime, circulated as manuscripts copied among musicians (Bach's children, students, and colleagues) until the late 18th century, already enjoying success. With publication in the early 19th century, their dissemination expanded. They became staples on the music stands of both amateur and professional pianists, and featured in concert programs—Chopin, for instance, would play from them before public appearances. Since Bach's time, the work has been used for keyboard practice and teaching composition and fugue writing. The music in these volumes is considered educational and aesthetically pleasing, due to the variety and technical mastery it demonstrates.

Each volume consists of twenty-four diptychs of a prelude and a fugue, exploring all major and minor keys in the order of the chromatic scale. The term "tempered" (referring to the tempered scale) relates to the tuning of keyboard instruments, which, to modulate to distant keys, requires slightly lowering the fifths (such that D♭ coincides with C♯), as in modern tuning systems. This allows the instrument to play in all keys. Bach thus explores tonalities rarely used in his time, opening new harmonic possibilities.

The preludes are inventive, sometimes approaching improvisation, drawing on the traditions of the toccata, the invention, or the arpeggiated prelude. The fugues, far from being dry or academic in form, are made expressive by Bach. They encompass a rich range of atmospheres, emotions, forms, and structures, alternately conveying joy, serenity, passion, or sorrow—offering a world filled with profound and vibrant humanity. Some incorporate various contrapuntal techniques (such as stretto, inversion, canon, etc.), while others do not, reflecting freedom and an absence of rigid systematization—an approach Bach reserves for his major contrapuntal masterpiece, The Art of Fugue, composed entirely in a single key: D minor.

== Prelude ==
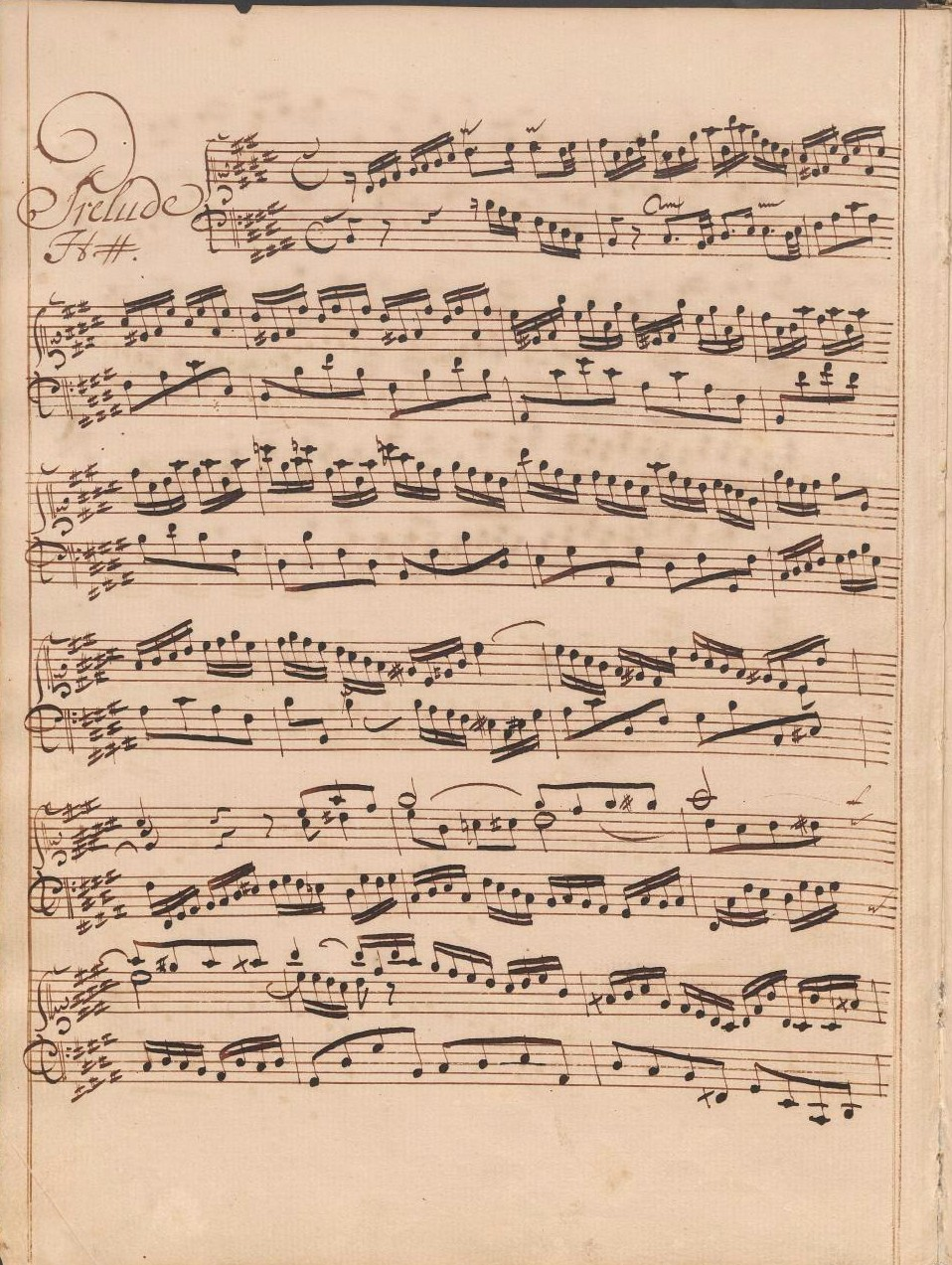
Beginning of the prelude (Ms. P 430, Berlin)

This work is considered "one of the most impressive pairs of Volume II of The Well-Tempered Clavier, on the same high level as the previous one," and the fugue is regarded as "one of the most perfect and balanced in the collection".

Described as a "new marvel of ingenuity and delicacy" and full of vitality, it takes on the character of a toccata, though composed in the manner of a virtuosic concerto or a sonata. It is closely related to the preludes in D minor and F♯ major, forming a group that shares similar material (toccata style, broken-chord sixteenth notes, etc.) but each within a different context.

It is structured in four sections: measures 1–12, 12–23, 24–36, followed by a shortened recapitulation in measures 37–46. This recapitulation is preceded by dissonant chords repeated eight times in the left hand (measure 35).

The first section resembles the Prelude and fugue in A♭ major (BWV 862) from the first book. After a two-voice introduction, a third voice enters at measure 12, though it only lasts for two or four measures each time (up to measure 24), evoking the style of a trio sonata.

"It is Mozart one believes to hear in advance in the exquisite dialogue that begins at measure 23," over an Alberti bass accompaniment. Among Bach's works, the closest atmosphere is found in the Sonata in D major for viola da gamba (BWV 1028), which also features, for example, "an emphatic pause on the dominant, preceded by eight repeated dissonant chords in the left hand." In terms of keyboard technique, the piece is comparable to the Prelude from the Partita in G major, BWV 829 (1730).

== Fugue ==
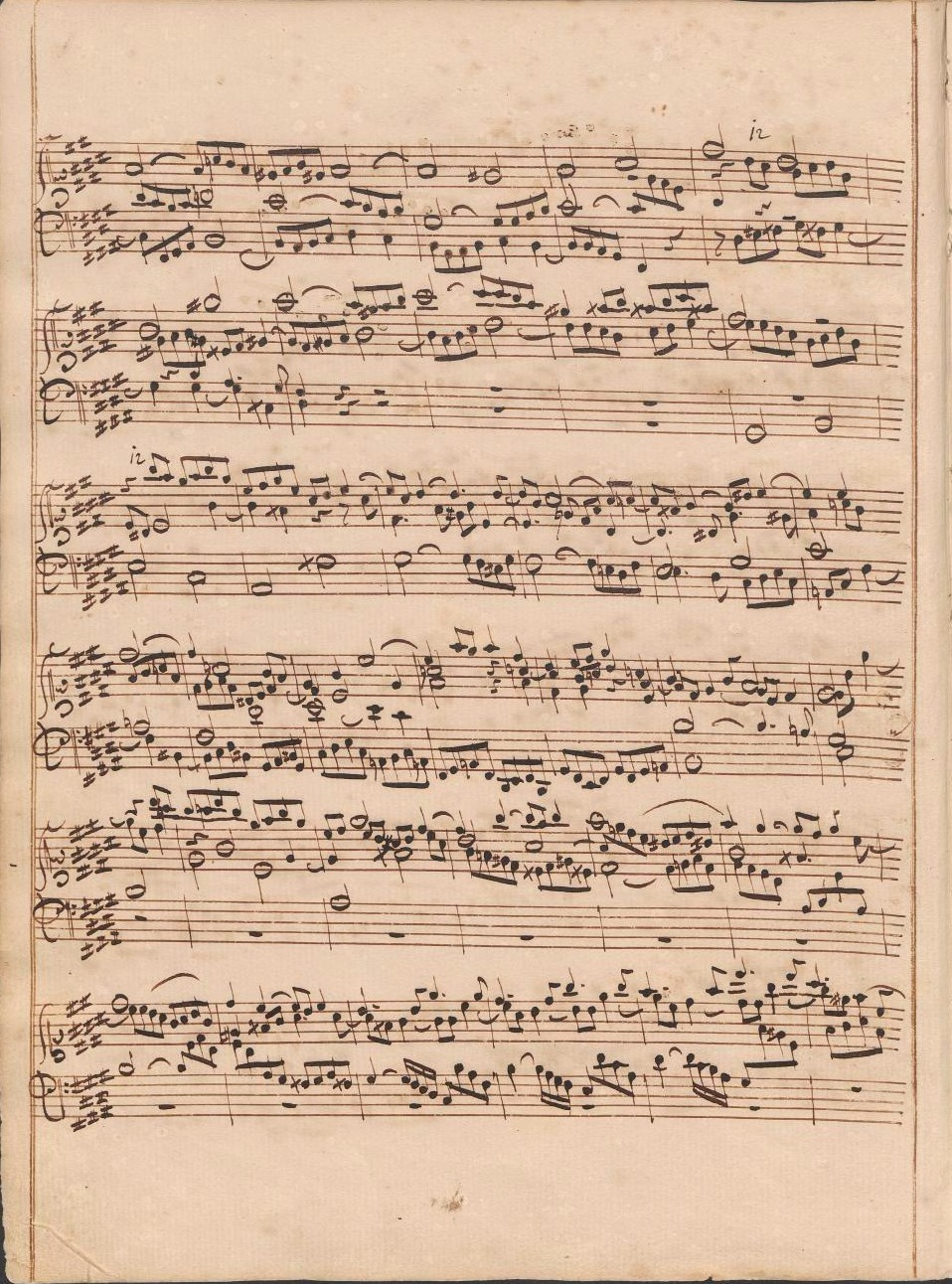
Second page of the fugue

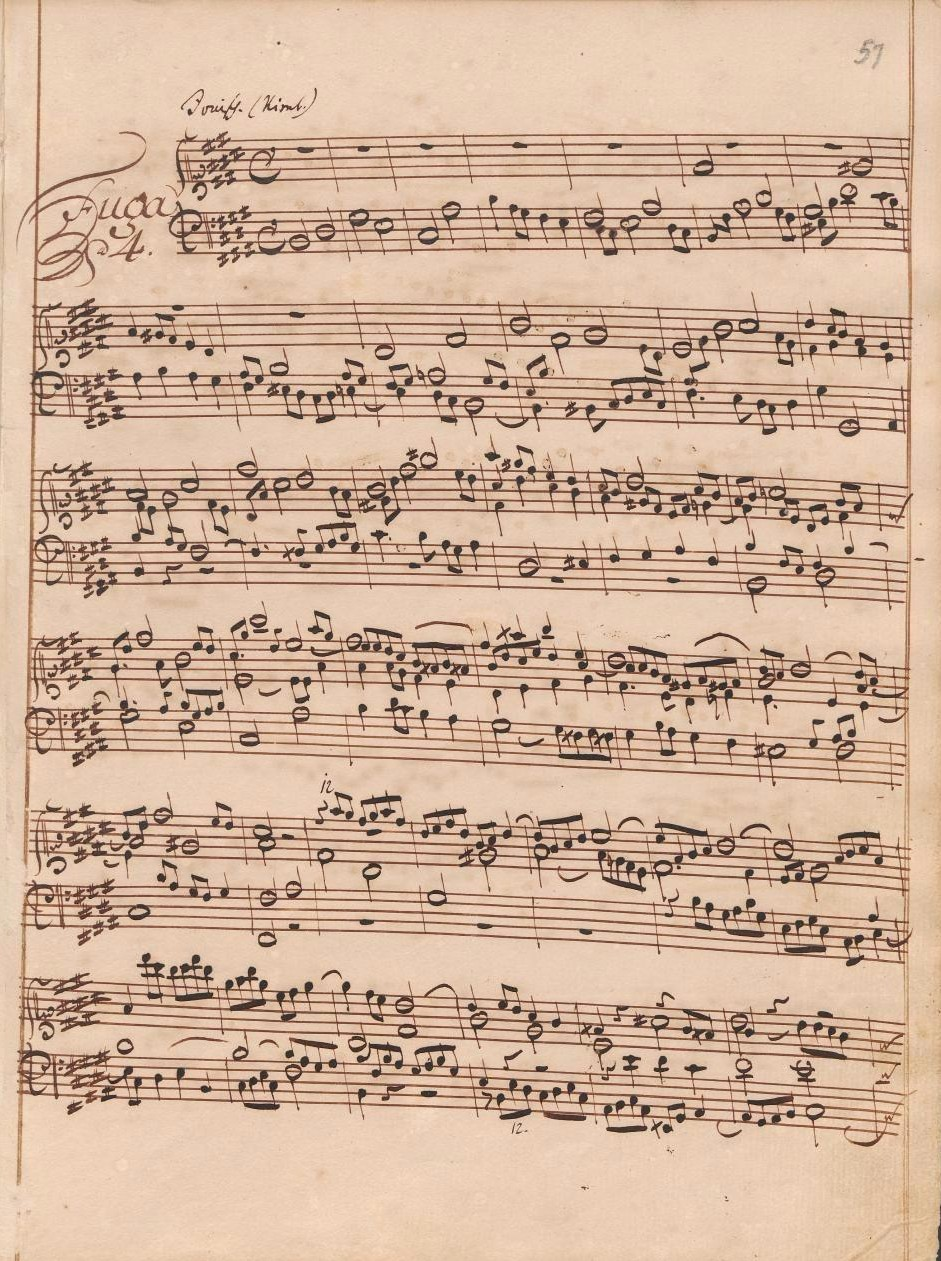
Beginning of the fugue (Ms. P 430, Berlin)

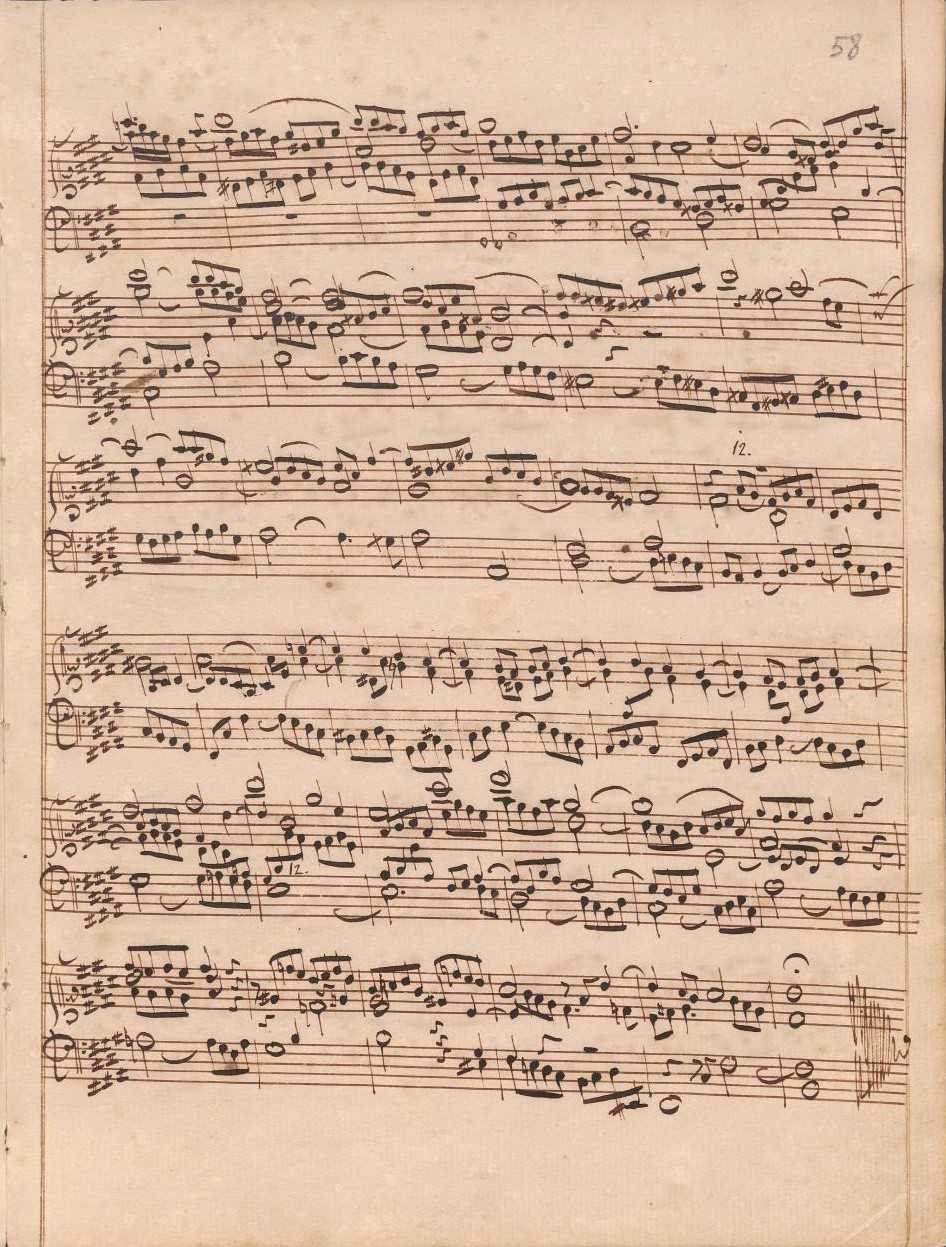
End of the fugue

The four-voice fugue, notated, spans 104 measures. Bach creates "a majestic work of extraordinary richness ... one of the most beautiful pieces of the second book". In contrast, the following fugue "seems disappointing as a conclusion to such a collection of masterpieces". Although it may not be among the most technically intricate achievements in The Well-Tempered Clavier—it employs no devices such as inversion or stretto—"this fugue is pure splendor and harmony."

It is a double fugue in stile antico that shows notable parallels with The Art of Fugue (specifically Contrapuncti 4 and 10), including its counterpoint lessons—such as invertible counterpoint subjects or the three-voice episode in measures 64–74—and the use of crossed voices.

Bach typically reserves his most rigorous counterpoint for minor keys. This fugue in B major is an exception, forming with its prelude one of the most striking pairs in the second book, equal in quality to the previous one and among the most serene four-part fugues in the collection.

The subject, consisting of detached half notes, spans an octave with great dignity and simplicity. Its opening notes directly echo the short final chord of the prelude.

During the exposition, the voices enter from the lowest to the highest range, followed by a new bass entry (measure 19) and an expressive cadence on the dominant (measure 27). A motif of descending eighth notes appears, combined with the answer in the tenor. At this point, the piece becomes a true double fugue, since this theme (or second subject) consistently accompanies the main subject (except at the bass entry in measure 75), entering one measure after it. The two themes are combined at the octave (measure 27) or at the twelfth (measures 42–45 and 53–58), with a shifted entry in measure 60. The preferred intervals in the combination of these subjects emphasize thirds and sixths. The appearance of the second subject, gentle in character, "expresses a feeling of resolution tinged with slight nostalgia".

The bass entry of the subject (measure 75) creates an effect similar to the final entries in the Prelude and fugue in F minor (BWV 857) and the Prelude and fugue in B minor (BWV 869) of the first book.

The countersubject has a markedly contrasting character to the subject, but proves to be just as beautiful and equally strong, in its ascent to the upper registers that energizes the entire exposition.

== Manuscripts ==
Among the sources, the manuscripts considered most important are in the hands of Bach or Anna Magdalena. They are:

- Source "A", British Library London (Add. MS. 35 021), compiled between 1739 and 1742. It includes 21 pairs of preludes and fugues: C minor, D major, and F minor (nos. 4, 5, and 12) are missing, as they were lost.
- Source "B", Berlin State Library (P 430), a copy dated 1744 by Johann Christoph Altnickol.

== Legacy ==
Emanuel Aloys Förster (1748–1823) created an arrangement of the fugue for string quartet, performed notably by the Emerson String Quartet.

Théodore Dubois produced a version for a piano four hands, published in 1914.
