= Piano Sonata No. 16 =

Piano Sonata No. 16 may refer to:

- Piano Sonata No. 16 (Beethoven)
- Piano Sonata No. 16 (Mozart)
