= Piano Sonata in A major =

Piano Sonata in A major may refer to:

- Piano Sonata No. 2 (Beethoven)
- Piano Sonata No. 28 (Beethoven)
- Piano Sonata No. 1 (Hindemith)
- Easter Sonata (Fanny Mendelssohn)
- Piano Sonata No. 11 (Mozart)
- Piano Sonata No. 6 (Prokofiev)
- Piano Sonata in A major, D 664 (Schubert)
- Piano Sonata in A major, D. 959 (Schubert)
