= The Mozart Piano Sonatas, Vol. 4 =

Studio album by Glenn Gould
- Released: September 28, 1973
- Recorded: 1965, 1967, 1970, 1972, 1973
- Studio: Columbia 30th St. Studio, New York; Eaton Auditorium, Toronto
- Genre: Classical
- Length: 47:39
- Label: Columbia Masterworks
- Producer: Andrew Kazdin

The Mozart Piano Sonatas, Vol. 4 is a 1973 album by the Canadian classical pianist Glenn Gould. It was Gould's fourth album of five dedicated to Mozart's piano sonatas. It includes the Sonata No. 11 In A Major, K. 331; Sonata No. 16 In C Major, K. 545; Fantasia No. 3 in D Minor, K. 397; and Sonata No. 15 in F Major, K. 533/K. 494.

== Conception ==
The album was compiled from recording sessions made on seven occasions between 1965 and 1973 at New York City's Columbia 30th Street Studio and Toronto's Eaton Auditorium. Columbia Records allowed Gould to record more often in his home city of Toronto due to the amount of travel involved in recording in New York; some twenty trips a year had been made.

Gould was known for using a great deal of interpretative freedom in playing. He frequently deviated from the scores on tempo and dynamics. This tendency was stronger with compositions he disliked; thus, his recordings of Mozart, whom he joked "died too late", feature his most notable departures from the score. In particular, his performance of the first movement of Sonata 11, K. 331, is considered by the music historian Kevin Bazzana to be one of his most "extreme" interpretations. The first movement consists of a theme and variations, beginning andante grazioso, yet Gould plays the theme "so maddenly slow that [he] had to get everyone's hackles aroused", as he told interviewer Humphrey Burton. He believed that each variation should increase in speed, contrary to Mozart's indications; thus the fifth variation, an adagio, is played allegro.

Gould justified these decisions based on the sonata's unusual form. In an interview with Bruno Monsaingeon he said "since the first movement is a nocturne-cum-minuet rather than a slow movement, and since the package is rounded off by that curious bit of seraglio-like exotica [he meant the famous concluding Rondo alla turca], one is dealing with an unusual structure, and virtually all of the sonata-allegro conventions can be set aside." Bazzana notes that Rachmaninoff also played the fifth variation non-adagio in his 1919 recording. Gould went on:

I wanted ... to subject it to a Webern-like scrutiny in which its basic elements would be isolated from each other and the continuity of the theme deliberately undermined. The idea was that each successive variation would contribute to the restoration of that continuity and, in the absorption of that task, would be less visible as an ornamental, decorative element. But to get back to your comment about the missing adagio, it seemed to me that once one had launched into that concept, that continuous forward propulsion, there simply could be no turning back; I thought that the nocturne-minuet would supply all the relaxation necessary. I can't say that I'm entirely convinced about the tempo choice for the Alla turca. At the time, it seemed important to establish a solid, maybe even stolid, tempo, partly to balance the tempo curve of the first movement—and, I admit frankly, partly because, to my knowledge, anyway, nobody had played it like that before, at least not on records.

== Reception ==
The official Glenn Gould website claims that no other of Gould's recordings received "a more solid thrashing than his reading of the A-major Sonata, K. 331".

Critic Peter G. Davis, reviewing a number of Gould albums for The New York Times, wrote: "the loudest anathemas will undoubtedly be reserved for the Mozart record, the fourth in an ongoing project.... One critic even went so far as to brand the previous disk in this series as 'the most loathsome record ever made.' The performances of Sonatas K. 331, K. 533, K. 545 and the D Minor Fantasy here will not make this sensitive soul any happier. They don’t make me very happy either. It is very difficult to see what Gould is out to prove, unless the rumor that he actually hates this music is true. Tempos are painfully slow, the clipped, détaché articulation violates phrase structure (and many of Mozart’s specific markings).... It all conjures up an image of a tremendously precocious but very nasty little boy trying to put one over on his piano teacher."
