= Prelude and Fugue in F major, BWV 880 =

Composition by Johann Sebastian Bach

Prelude and Fugue in F major (BWV 880)
- Key: F major
- Related: The Well-Tempered Clavier, Book II
- Meter: Prelude: 3/2; Fugue: 6/16

The Prelude and Fugue in F major, BWV 880, is the 11th pair of preludes and fugues in the second book of The Well-Tempered Clavier by Johann Sebastian Bach, composed between 1739 and 1744.

After the previous diptych in E minor, for F major, Bach follows it with a prelude that, unusually, evokes the Prelude in E♭ major from the first book, with similar organ-like swirls and sustained notes. In a gigue rhythm, the three-voice fugue features a free counterpoint and borrows from the concerto style.

Many composers and educators consider the two volumes of The Well-Tempered Clavier a benchmark. Initially copied by musicians and then published at the beginning of the 19th century, beyond the musical pleasure they bring to music lovers, they have served since their composition as a means of studying keyboard technique and the art of composition.

== Context ==
The Well-Tempered Clavier is widely recognized as a significant work in the history of classical music. It has served as a reference or point of study for composers such as Joseph Haydn, Mozart, Beethoven, Robert Schumann, Frédéric Chopin, Richard Wagner, César Franck, Max Reger, Gabriel Fauré, Claude Debussy, Maurice Ravel, Igor Stravinsky, Charles Koechlin, among others. Hans von Bülow referred to it as a fundamental work, describing it as the Old Testament of music, in comparison to Beethoven's thirty-two sonatas, which he called the New Testament.

The scores, unpublished during the composer's lifetime, were initially passed down through manuscripts, copied among musicians (Bach's children and students, fellow musicians...) until the end of the 18th century, already enjoying considerable success. With publication beginning in the early 19th century, their dissemination expanded. They became staples on the music stands of amateur pianists and professional musicians, and were performed in concerts—Chopin, for instance, would play a piece privately before his public appearances. The work has been used from Bach's time to the present day for keyboard practice and also for teaching composition and the writing of fugues. The music in these pages serves an educational purpose and also offers a diverse selection of material, characterized by its variety, structural elements, and compositional technique.

Each volume consists of twenty-four diptychs (preludes and fugues) that explore all major and minor keys in chromatic order. The term "tempered" (Tempered Scale) refers to the tuning of keyboard instruments, which, to modulate to distant keys, requires flattening fifths (e.g., D♭ becoming equivalent to C♯), as in modern tuning. Thus, the instrument can play in all keys. Bach consequently explores new tonalities that were almost unused in his time, opening new harmonic horizons.

The preludes display a variety of musical approaches, sometimes resembling improvisation and drawing from traditions such as the toccata, invention, or arpeggiated prelude. The fugues incorporate expressive elements and encompass a range of moods, forms, and structures, including techniques such as stretto, inversion, and canons. Others employ fewer or no such techniques, reflecting a flexible compositional approach rather than a systematic method. This contrasts with the more structured approach found in The Art of Fugue, composed entirely in the key of D minor.

== Prelude ==
The five-voice prelude is marked in common time 3/2 and has 72 measures.

Unlike other preludes in the collection, what stands out here is the sonority and fullness of its four- or five-part harmonic texture, in a style that suggests the possible existence of an organ prelude at the origin of the piece rather than for the clavichord. This prelude can be compared to the one in E♭ major from the first book, with those same organ-like sustained notes.

== Fugue ==
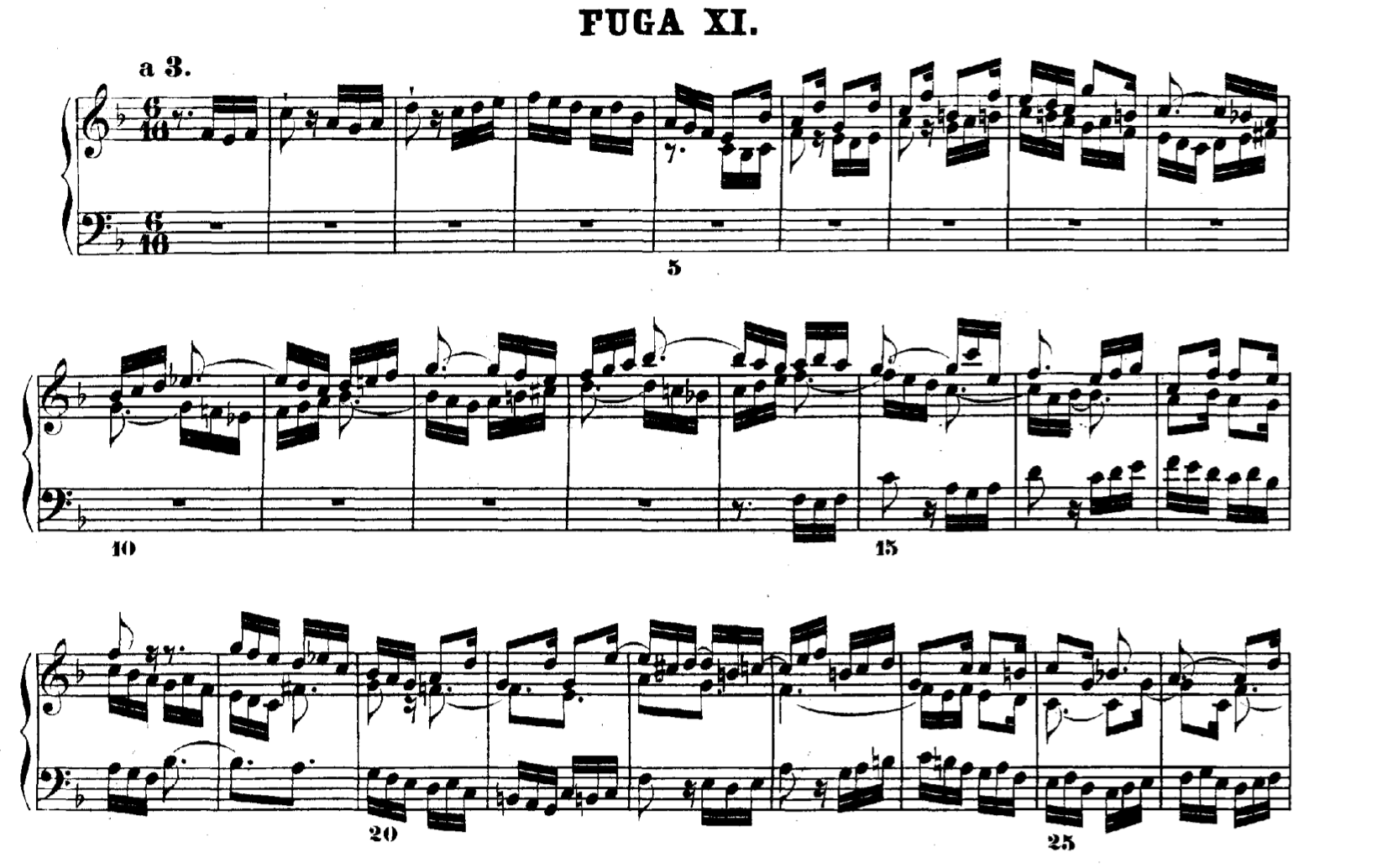
Fuga in F♯ major

The three-voice fugue is 99 measures long.

This fugue contrasts in character with the preceding prelude, which has a calmer character, while the fugue features a more animated rhythmic structure. The subject begins with three upward intervals: two ascending figures that reach the sixth degree of the key, followed by a sequence of sixteenth notes that rise to the upper octave by measure 4, before descending back to F. The meter, written in compound time 6/16, introduces a rhythmic pattern characteristic of a gigue. Unlike the fugue in Prelude and Fugue in F♯ major, BWV 882, where the subject begins with an anacrusis, this fugue starts on a strong beat after a rest, producing a different rhythmic structure.

The entries in the exposition are soprano, alto, and bass, with the latter entering in the tenor register only in measure 14, while the following answer appears in the bass register (measure 21). From measure 5, Bach introduces a new rhythm, abundantly used thereafter, of the eighth note followed by two sixteenths.

Kirnberger conveyed the only known performance indication from Bach's disciples about The Well-Tempered Clavier, regarding the subject of this fugue: "It should be played in a flowing motion, lightly and without the slightest finger pressure." Kirnberger refers to the clavichord when speaking of finger pressure.

Absent during the central episode, the subject returns at the end in the bass, humorously with four leaps instead of the subject's usual three—"as if it were stumbling along".

The first section ends at measure 29. For 24 measures, Bach omits the subject and plays with the same motif that had connected the end of the comes and the subject's return at measure 14. It is only at measure 52 that the subject is reintroduced in the tenor, and the answer in the bass is delayed until measure 66, after a dominant pedal point.

This fugue contains no regular countersubject, no stretto, diminution, augmentation, inversion, or other contrapuntal devices, making it an unusual work.

== Manuscripts ==
The most important manuscripts are in the hands of Bach or Anna Magdalena. They are:

- Source "A," British Library London (Add. MS. 35 021), compiled between 1739–1742. Includes 21 pairs of preludes and fugues: C minor, D major, and F minor (nos. 4, 5, and 12) are missing (♯);
- Source "B," Berlin State Library (P 430), a copy dated 1744, by Johann Christoph Altnikol.
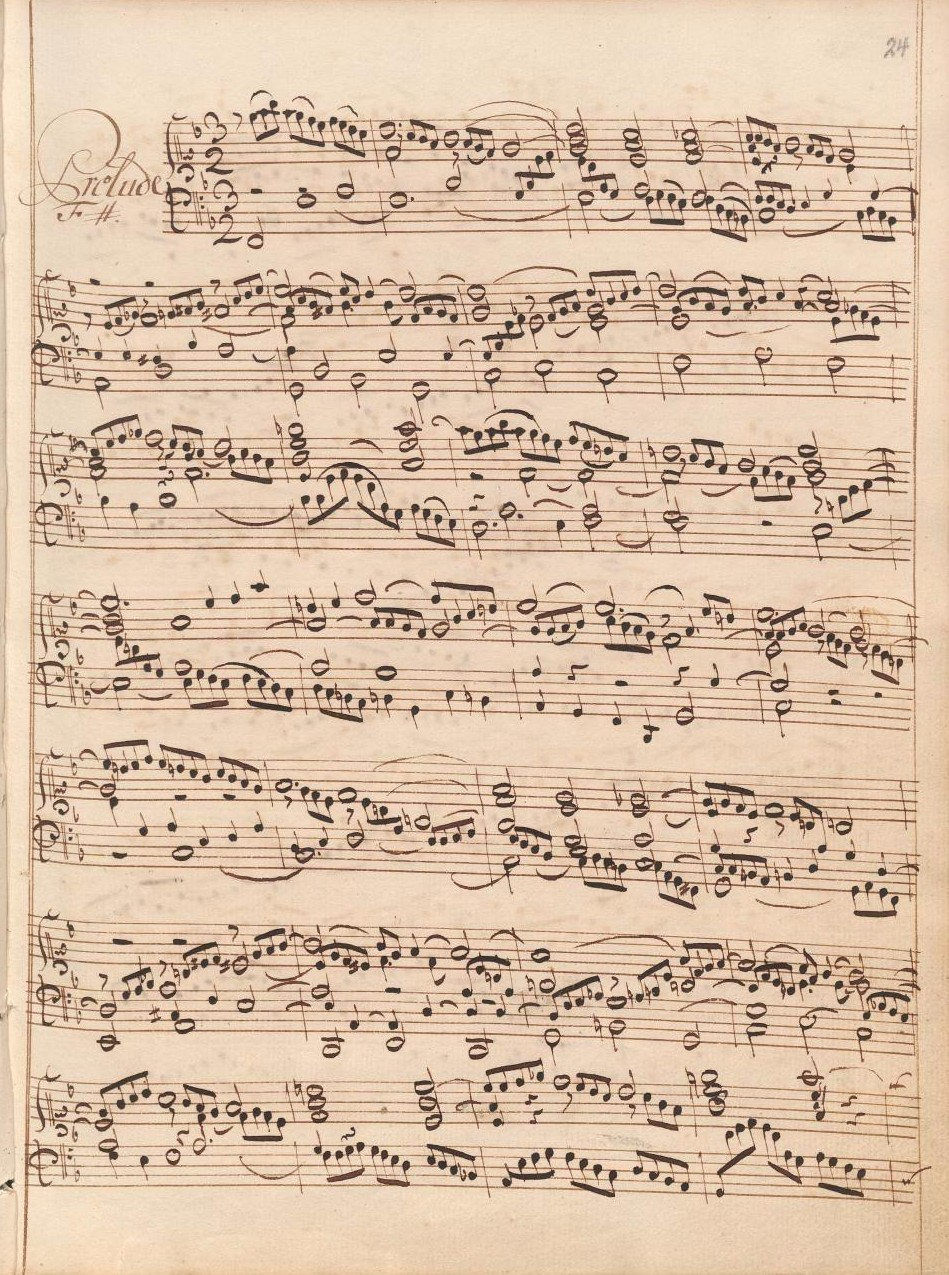
Beginning of the prelude, Ms. P 430.

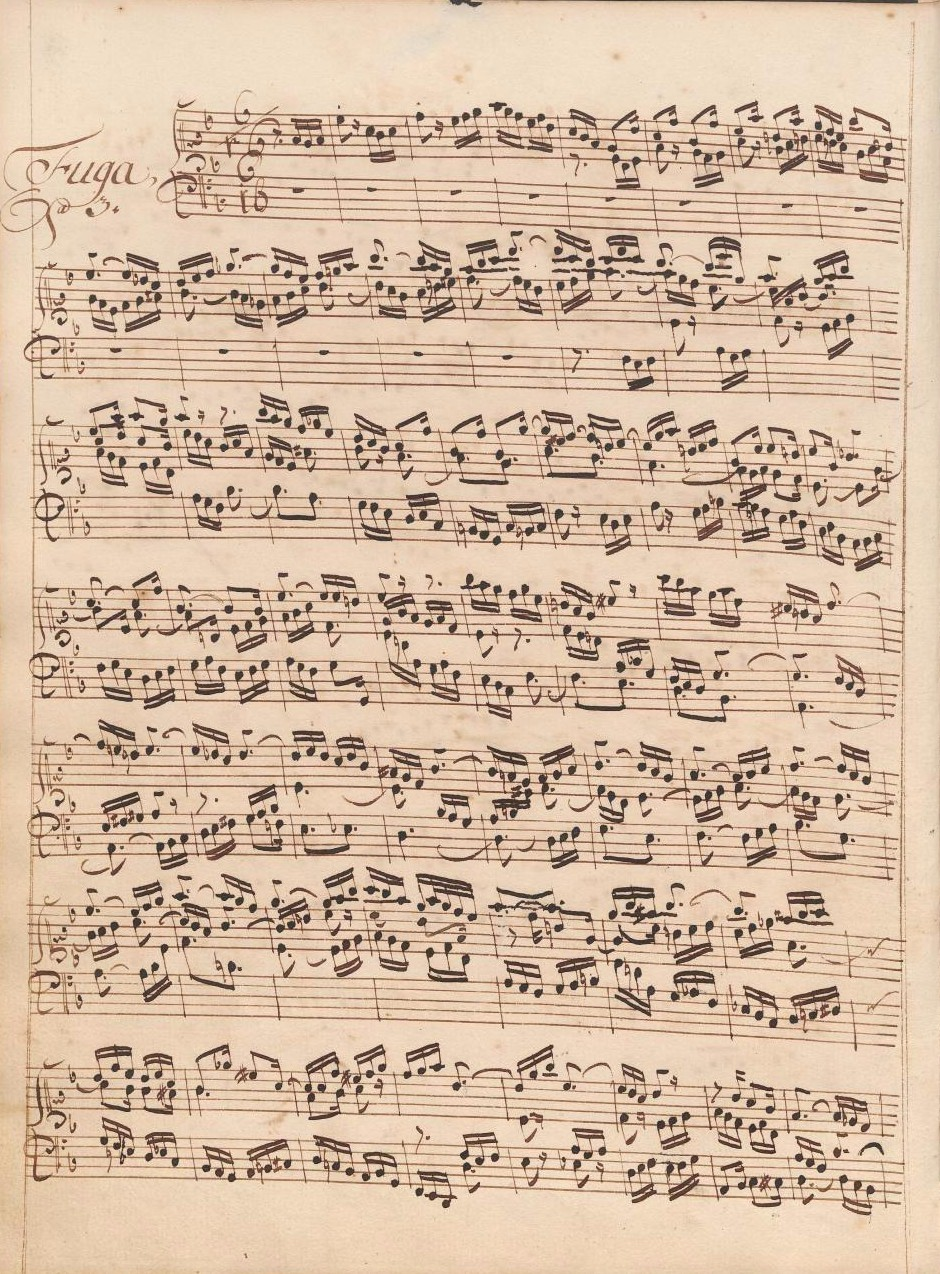
Beginning of the fugue, Ms. P 430.

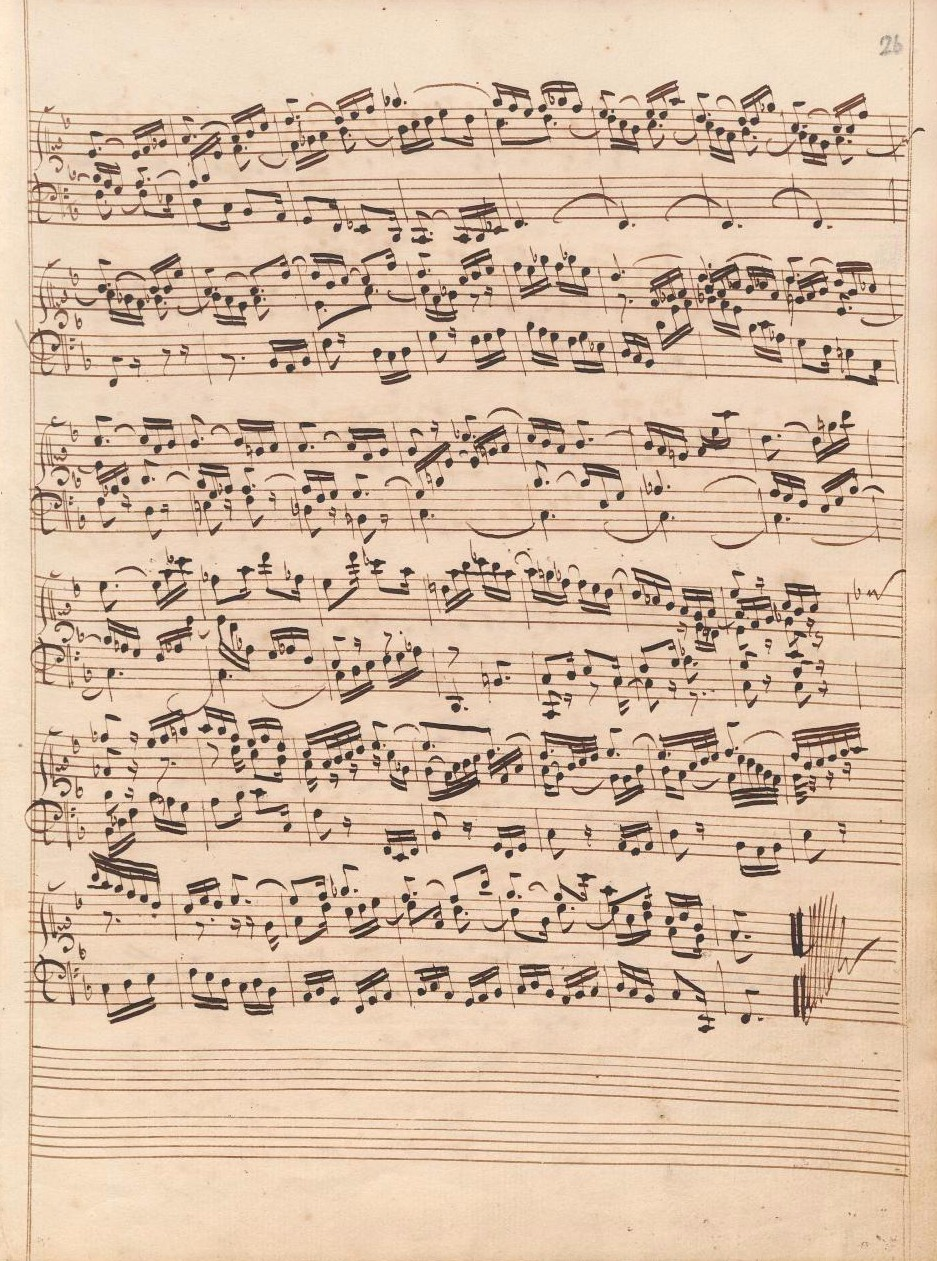
End of the fugue.

== Legacy ==
Théodore Dubois made a version for piano four hands, published in 1914.

== See also ==
- Fugue
- Glossary of music terminology
