= Haydn: The Six Last Sonatas =

Studio album by Glenn Gould
- Released: 1982
- Recorded: 1981
- Genre: Classical
- Length: 1:20:00
- Label: Columbia

Haydn: The Six Last Sonatas is Glenn Gould's only album dedicated solely to the composer Joseph Haydn, although in 1958 he had released an album consisting of music by both Haydn and his contemporary, Wolfgang Amadeus Mozart. In 1983, a year after Gould's death, the album was nominated for Best Classical Album at the Juno Awards of 1983 but lost to another of Gould's recordings, Bach: The Goldberg Variations.

== See also ==
- Glenn Gould discography
