= Piano Sonata No. 15 =

Piano Sonata No. 15 may refer to:

- Piano Sonata No. 15 (Beethoven)
- Piano Sonata No. 15 (Mozart)
