= Prelude and Fugue in C-sharp minor, BWV 873 =

Keyboard composition by Johann Sebastian Bach

The Prelude and Fugue in C♯ minor, BWV 873, is a keyboard composition written by Johann Sebastian Bach in 1738. It is the 4th prelude and fugue in Book II of The Well-Tempered Clavier.

== Prelude ==
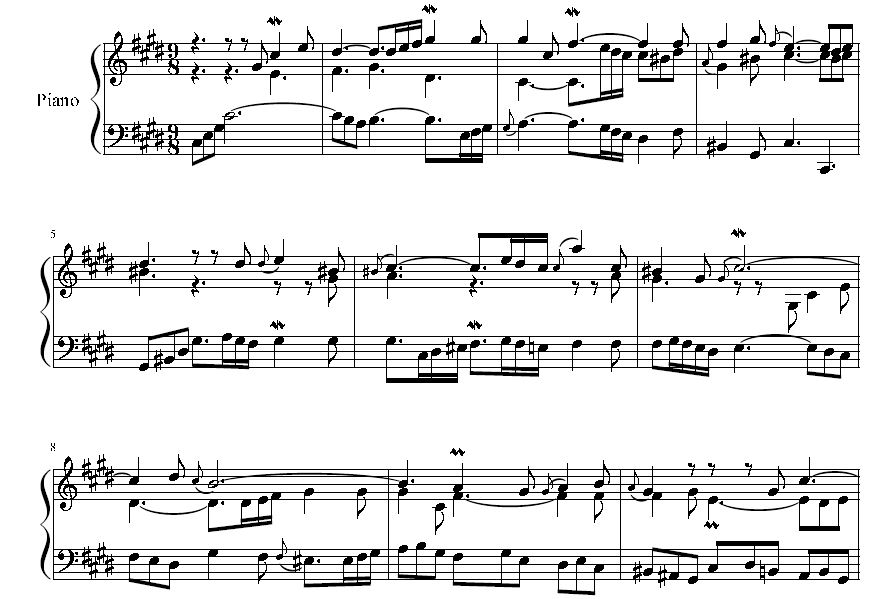
Incipit of prelude

The prelude is in the time signature of 9/8 time. It is in the key of C♯ minor. The Prelude is heavily ornamented with mordents and appoggiaturas.

== Fugue ==
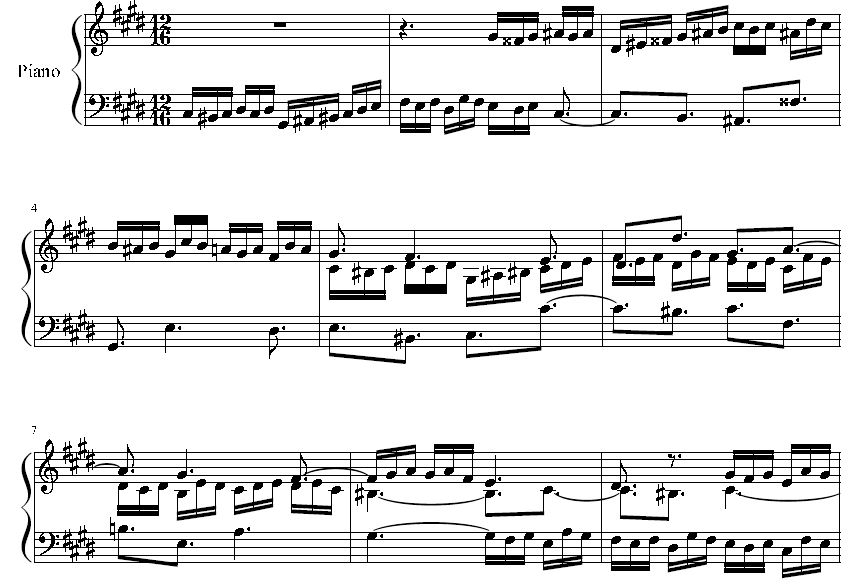
Incipit of fugue

The fugue is in 12/16 time. It is also in C♯ minor. Unlike its prelude, the fugue does not have much ornamentation.
