= Piano Sonata No. 6 (Beethoven) =

Composition by Ludwig van Beethoven

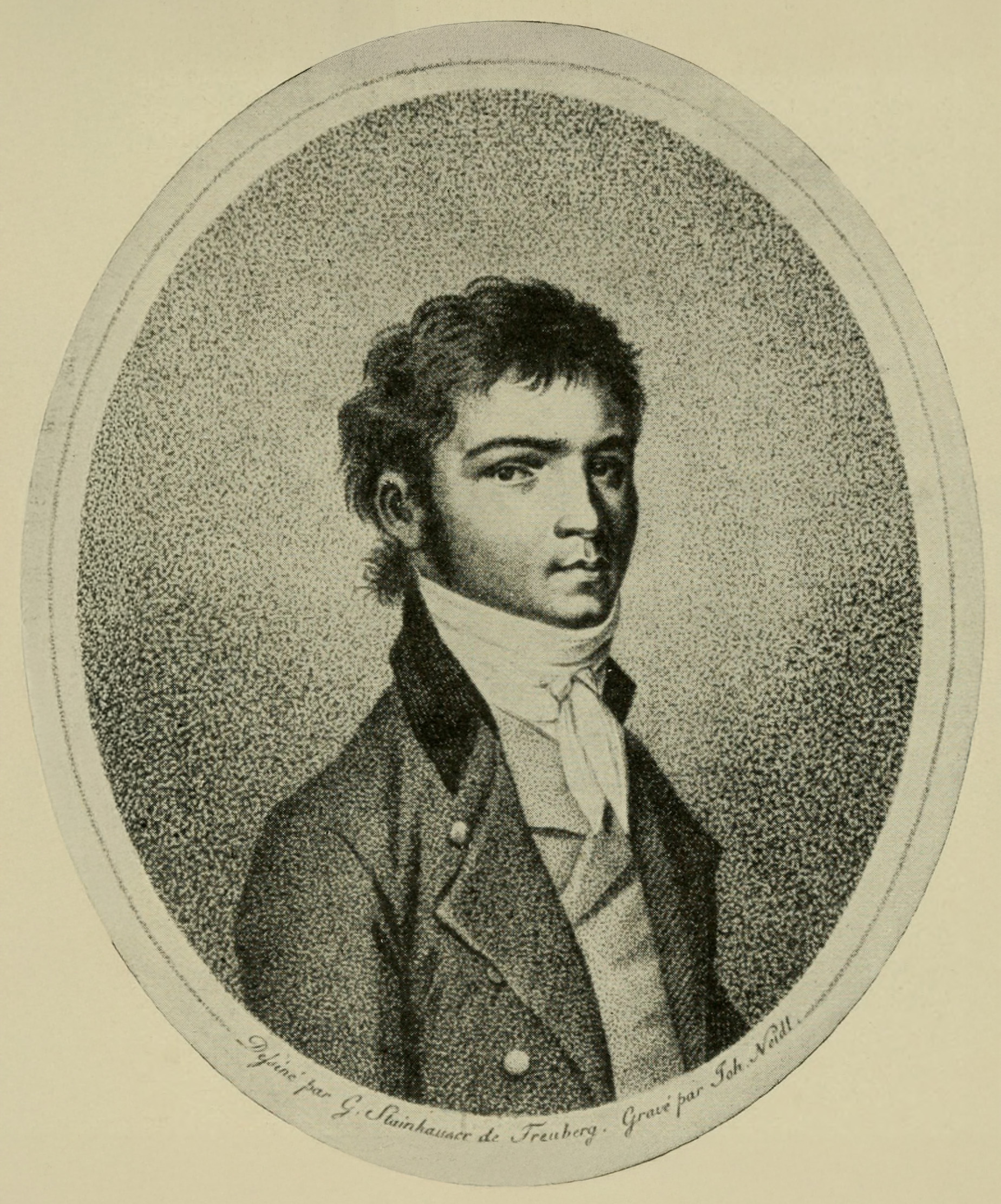
Beethoven in 1796; designed by G. Stainhauser; engraving by Johann Josef Neidl, executed for the publisher Artaria

I. Allegro

II. Menuetto. Allegretto

III. Presto
Played by Artur Schnabel in 1932

Ludwig van Beethoven's Piano Sonata No. 6 in F major, Op. 10, No. 2, was dedicated to the Countess Anne Margarete von Browne, and written from 1796 to 1798. It was published in Vienna by Joseph Eder in 1798.

The sonata spans approximately 14 minutes.

== Form ==
The sonata is divided into three movements:

1. Allegro, in F major
2. Menuetto. Allegretto, in F minor
3. Presto, in F major

=== I. Allegro ===

The first movement is in sonata form. The development is based on the C–G–C tag which concludes the exposition, with no clear use of any other material from the exposition. The recapitulation is unusual because the 1st theme returns in D major before modulating back to tonic for the second theme.

=== II. Menuetto. Allegretto ===

The second movement is a minuet in F minor with a trio, with the return of the minuet strongly embellished. It is more reminiscent of Beethoven's bagatelles than of most of his minuets. The trio, in D♭ major, has a hint of anticipation of the third movement of Symphony No. 1.

=== III. Presto ===

The third movement is in sonata form, with a fugal development. The exposition has theme 1 in F major and a closing section in C major. The recapitulation is unusual because the 1st theme is a fugal variation instead of a literal repeat. The movement has a coda based on the closing section.
