= Prelude and Fugue in G-sharp minor, BWV 887 =

Keyboard composition by Johann Sebastian Bach

BWV 887 played on a piano

The Prelude and Fugue in G♯ minor, BWV 887, is the eighteenth prelude and fugue in the second volume of The Well-Tempered Clavier by Johann Sebastian Bach. It was written in 1738.

== Prelude ==
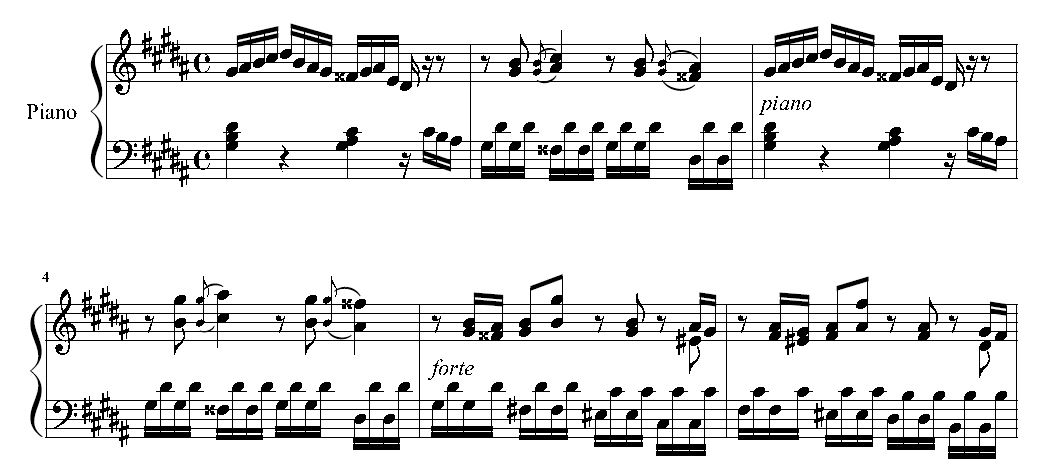
Beginning of Prelude

The prelude is in common time and has 50 measures. It is primarily made up of sixteenth notes and eighth notes. It has many accidentals.

== Fugue ==
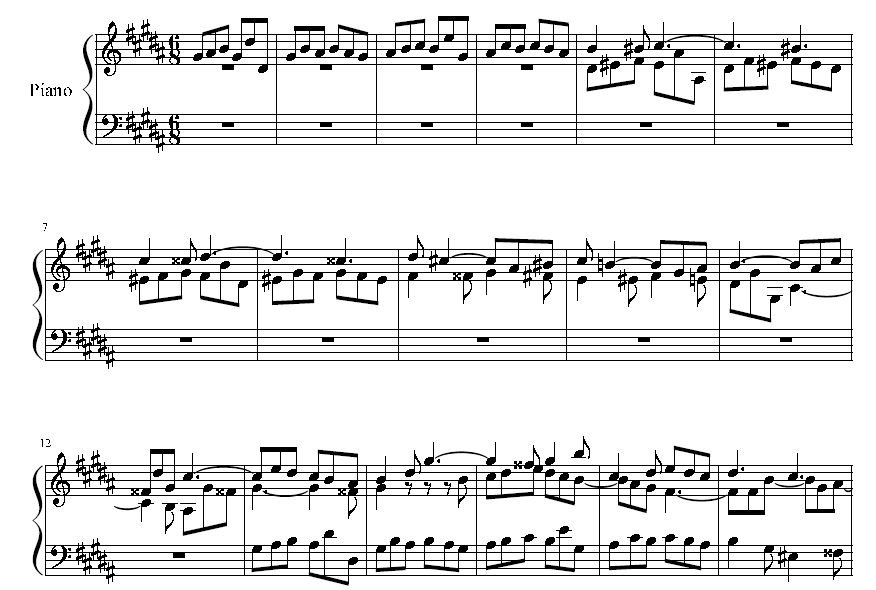
Beginning of Fugue

The fugue is in 6/8 and has 143 measures. It is made up mostly of eighth notes, quarter notes, dotted quarter notes, and sixteenth notes. It has a subject and a countersubject, although the countersubject does not always accompany the subject. Starting from measure 61, the second subject appears, which is similar to the countersubject, both in a chromatic scale. In measure 97, the first and second subject begins to appear together, with the second subject joining one quarter note after, and one octave higher or lower than the first subject; they appeared in total for five times until the end, always in the same form.
