= Prelude and Fugue in F-sharp major, BWV 882 =

The Prelude and Fugue in F♯ major, BWV 882, is a keyboard composition written by Johann Sebastian Bach. It is the thirteenth prelude and fugue in the second book of The Well-Tempered Clavier, a series of 48 preludes and fugues by the composer.

== Analysis ==
=== Prelude ===
The prelude is 75 measures long and has two voices for the most part. Addition voices were added in the concluding measures for the sake of enriching the harmony. This prelude has a punctuated rhythm, similar to the style of a French overture. Bach also wrote out the ornaments himself.

=== Fugue ===
The fugue is 84 measures long and in the form of a gavotte.

== Remarks ==
This piece is the thirteenth piece in The Well-Tempered Clavier, which divides the first and second half of the work. The prelude has a distinct Gallic flair; with its ornamentations and dotted rhythms, it reminisces of the 16th variation of the Goldberg Variations, which also divides the work in half, and is also in French style.
