= Piano Sonata No. 5 (Mozart) =

1774 composition by W. A. Mozart

Piano Sonata in G major
- No. 5
- by W. A. Mozart
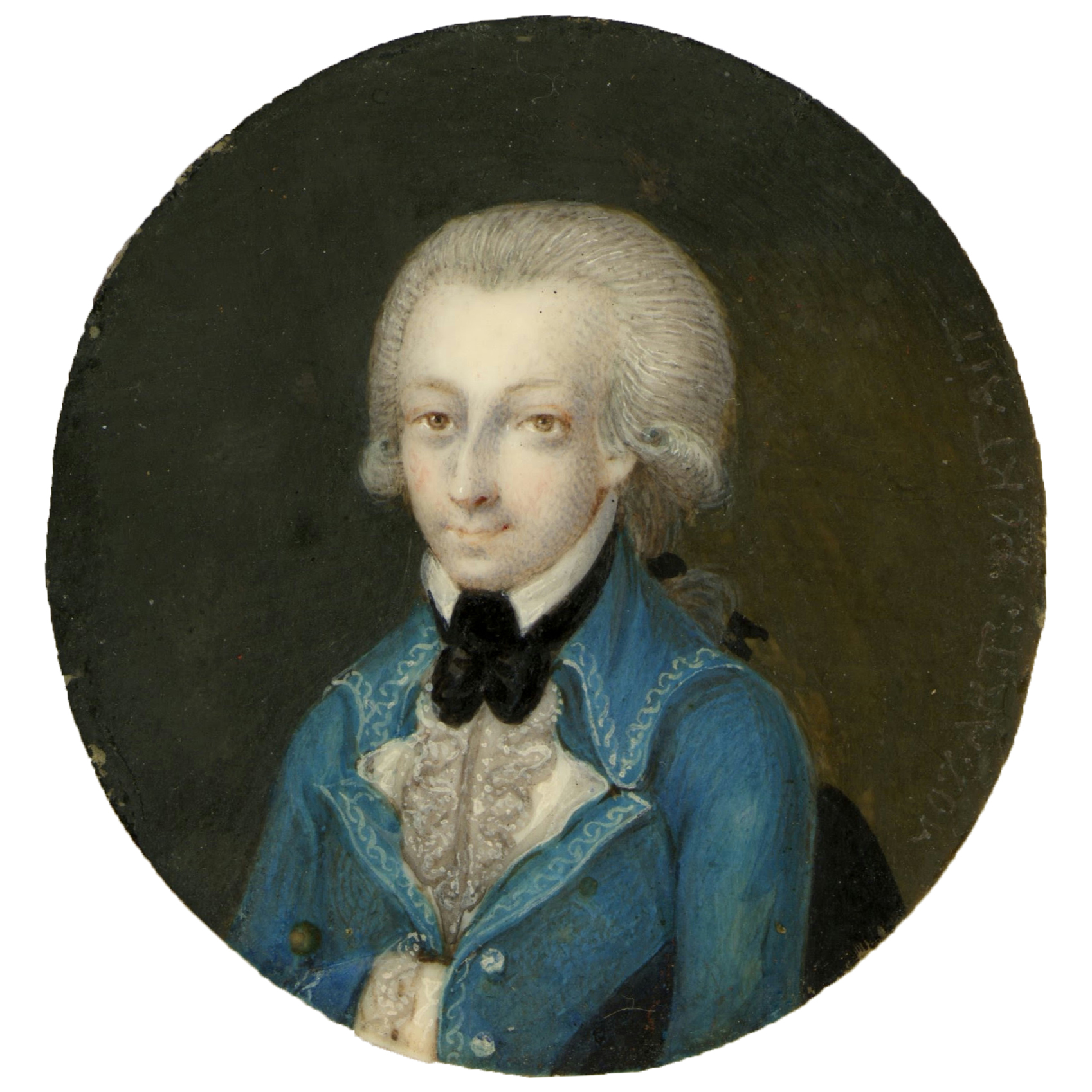
- 1773 miniature of Mozart
- Key: G major
- Catalogue: K. 283/189h
- Style: Classical period
- Composed: 1774
- Movements: Three (Allegro, Andante, Presto)

Wolfgang Amadeus Mozart's Piano Sonata No. 5 in G major, K. 283/189h, (1774) is a piano sonata in three movements:

1. Allegro
2. Andante (in C major)
3. Presto

This sonata is part of the earliest group of sonatas that Mozart published in the mid-1770s. The first movement, in sonata form, is concise, with an economy of materials. The development section is a mere 18 measures long. The shorter length and moderate technical demands make it an ideal piece for early-advanced study and performance.

A typical performance takes twelve to eighteen (Sviatoslav Richter) minutes.

The work was written down during the visit Mozart paid to Munich for the production of his La finta giardiniera from late 1774 to the beginning of the following March.
