= Prelude and Fugue in E-flat major, BWV 852 =

Keyboard composition by J. S. Bach

The Prelude and Fugue in E♭ major, BWV 852, is a keyboard composition by Johann Sebastian Bach. It is the seventh prelude and fugue in the first book of The Well-Tempered Clavier, a series of 48 preludes and fugues by the composer.

== Analysis ==
Prelude, played by Kimiko Douglass-Ishizaka

=== Prelude ===
The prelude is 70 measures long, and consists of three sections:

- The first section begins from the first measure and lasts until m. 10. It is a short toccata, mainly made of energetic semiquaver movements, with the ending two measures (m. 8 and 9) made of demisemiquavers. It establishes the tonic key (E♭), presents theme I, and ends on the dominant (B♭).
- The second section starts at m. 10, and ends at m. 25. It is a chorale, in the style of four-part harmony, introducing theme II.
- The third section starts at m. 25 and lasts until the end. It is a four-voice double fugue, and the first subject is introduced in the alto (theme I extended), second subject in the bass (theme II). This section is three times as long as the other two sections together.

This prelude is unique among the 48 preludes of The Well-Tempered Clavier because it already includes a fully developed fugue. It may originally have been conceived for organ (the early version has fewer semiquavers in the bass of the second section than the final one). (Note: Harpsichordist Pieter-Jan Belder also supports this idea. He cites the example that the bass D in m. 64 is only a semiquaver, which he considers too short, and awkward. In the organ, this D can be sustained because of the pedal, but with only a keyboard (e.g. in the harpsichord), the tenor has to move on and the bass D has to be released again.)

Fugue, played by Kimiko Douglass-Ishizaka

=== Fugue ===
The fugue is 37 measures long and has three voices. Its light style contrasts strongly with the prelude.

== Notes and references ==
Notes

Sources

- Belder, Pieter-Jan (2021-02-14), Belder on Bach WTC I Prelude and fugue no. 7 in E-flat major BWV 852, Netherlands Bach Society – via YouTube
- Ledbetter, David (2002). Bach's Well-tempered Clavier: The 48 Preludes and Fugues. Yale University Press. ISBN 978-0-300-09707-8. JSTOR j.ctt1npnnf.
- Riemann, Hugo (1893). Analysis of J. S. Bach's Wohltemperirtes clavier (48 preludes & fugues). Vol. 1. Translated by Shedlock, John South. London: Augener & Co.
