= Piano Sonata No. 1 (Hindemith) =

- Der Main
- by Paul Hindemith
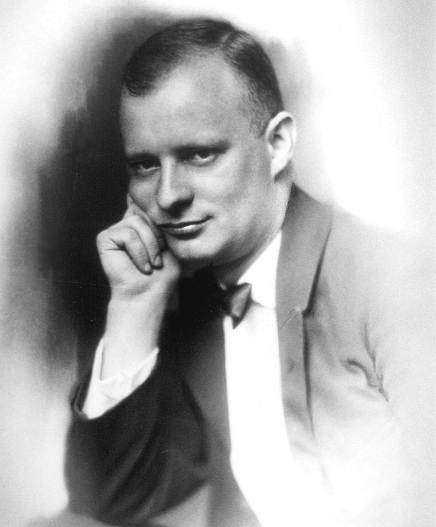
- Paul Hindemith, aged 28
- English: The River Main
- Key: A major
- Genre: Modern music
- Form: Sonata
- Composed: 1936: Turkey
- Published: 1936: Mainz
- Movements: 5
- Scoring: Piano

Piano Sonata No. 1 in A major is the first piano sonata by German composer Paul Hindemith. It was finished in 1936 and is subtitled Der Main (translated into English as The River Main) after a poem by Friedrich Hölderlin.

== Composition ==
In 1933, Hindemith was increasingly fearful of the newly constituted German National Regime and had lost the influence of Wilhelm Furtwängler, who conducted Hindemith's Mathis der Maler and was dismissed from his position in the Berlin State Opera. Thanks to Kemal Atatürk, Hindemith moved to Turkey in 1936 to establish a national musical education system. At that time, he decided to compose the sonata, before moving to Switzerland and, subsequently, to the United States of America.

The sonata was inspired by a poem entitled Der Main by Friedrich Hölderlin, though it did not contain its text nor did the sonata make any specific reference to any of the parts of the poem. This composition was published in Mainz by Schott Music that same year.

== Analysis ==
The sonata has an unusual form, as it consists of five movements of irregular duration. It takes approximately 22 minutes to perform. The movement list is as follows:

1. Ruhig bewegte Viertel
2. Im Zeitmaß eines sehr langsamen Marsches — Etwas lebhafter — Im Anfangszeitmaß
3. Lebhaft — Lebhafter
4. Ruhig bewegte Viertel, wie im ersten Teil
5. Lebhaft — Energisch — Lebhaft, wie früher

The general tone of the movements is melancholic and introverted, specially shown in movements first and fourth. The second movement was initially conceived to be a set of variations; however, Hindemith decided to discard the second movement and replace it with a very slow march. These variations were later published as a stand-alone set and were to premiere that same year, but political circumstances made it impossible to be performed in public. The third movement is a quick, scherzo-like piece, and is in the same general tone as the fifth one.
