= Prelude and Fugue in B minor, BWV 893 =

1738 keyboard composition by Johann Sebastian Bach

Prelude and Fugue B minor

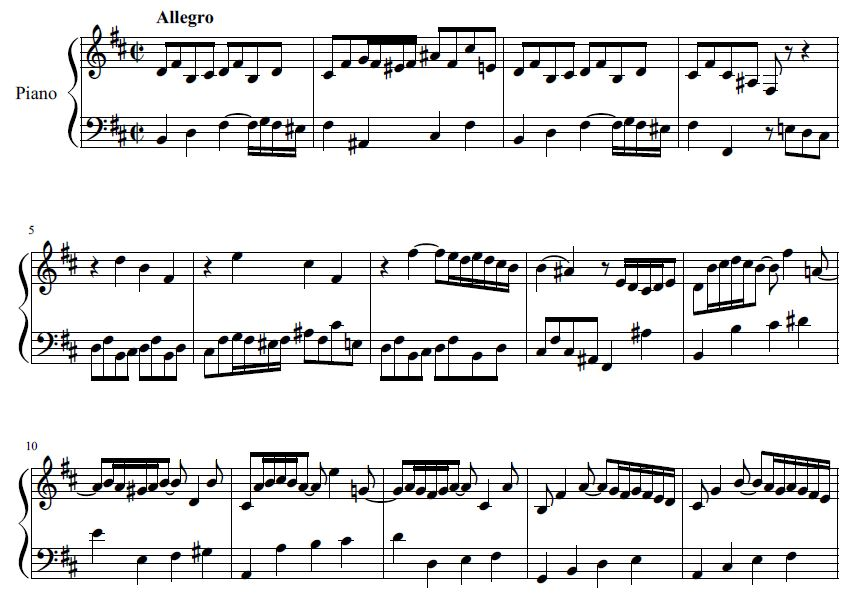
Opening of the prelude

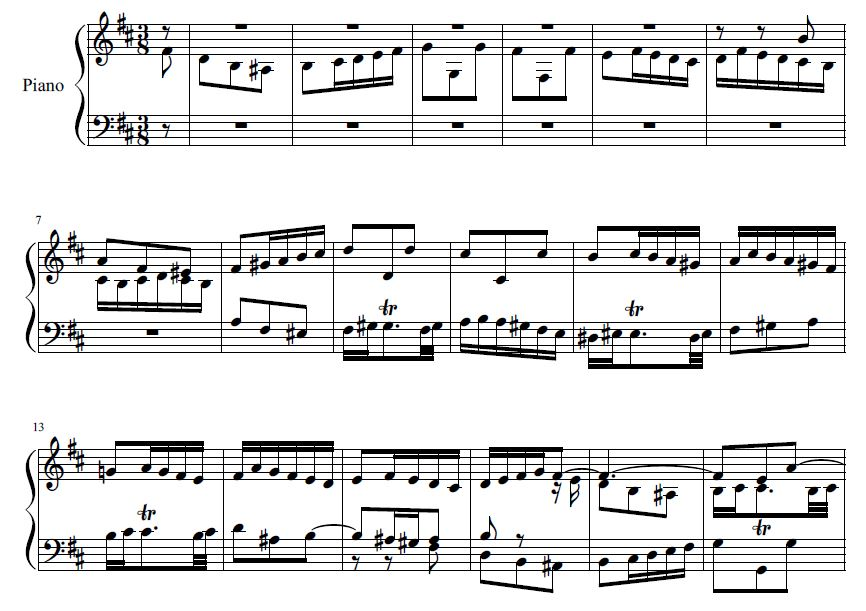
Opening of the fugue

Prelude and Fugue in B minor, BWV 893, is a keyboard composition by Johann Sebastian Bach. It is the 24th and final prelude and fugue in the second book of The Well-Tempered Clavier, a series of 48 preludes and fugues by the composer. It was composed in 1738.

== Prelude ==
The prelude is in the key of B minor and in the time signature of cut time (2/2) (some editions however, including the Altnickol and Tovey editions have it at 4/4 common time). It is in two voices and has 66 measures. There is rarely any ornamentation in this piece.

== Fugue ==
The fugue is also in B minor and is in 3/8. It is in 3 voices and has 100 measures. It ends with a Picardy third.
