= Piano Sonata No. 10 (Beethoven) =

Composition by Ludwig van Beethoven

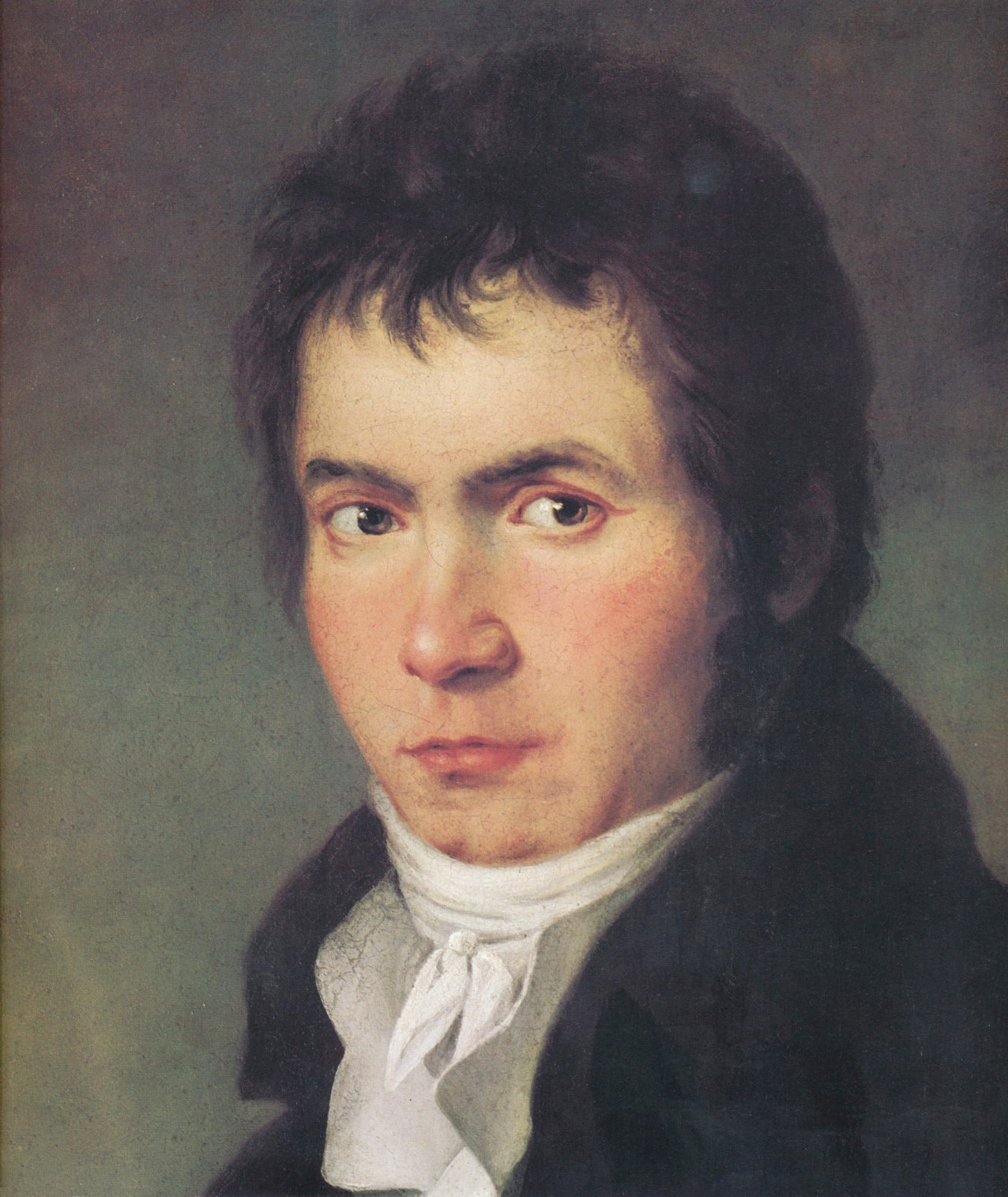
Beethoven in c. 1804–1805; painted by Joseph Willibrord Mähler (1778–1860)

The Piano Sonata No. 10 in G major, Op. 14, No. 2, composed in 1798–1799, is an early-period work by Ludwig van Beethoven, dedicated to Baroness Josefa von Braun. A typical performance lasts 15 minutes. While it is not as well known as some of the more original sonatas of Beethoven's youth, such as the Pathétique or Moonlight sonatas, Donald Francis Tovey described it as an 'exquisite little work.'

== Form ==
I. Allegro

II. Andante

III. Scherzo. Allegro assai
Performed by Artur Schnabel in 1932

The sonata is in three movements:

1. Allegro, in G major
2. Andante, in C major
3. Scherzo: Allegro assai, in G major

=== I. Allegro ===
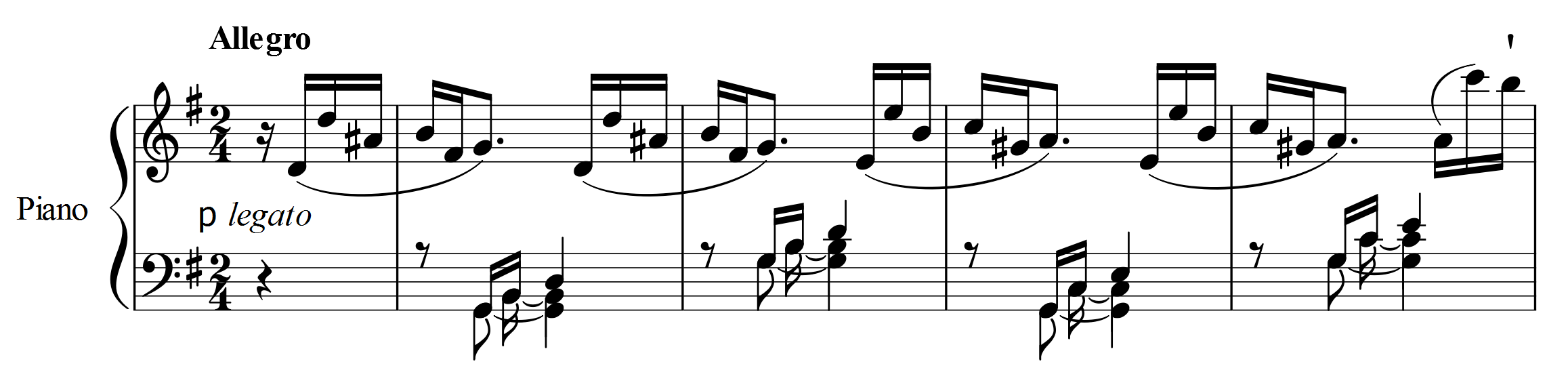

The first movement, marked legato in the urtext score, opens with a brief sixteenth-note phrase, accompanied by short, tied arpeggios in the bass. This phrase is used consistently throughout the movement and subject to a great deal of highly imaginative development through changing harmonies and shifting key-centres. Bars 70–80 are particularly notable, in that the main theme is subjected to highly chromatic treatment at this point. Thirty-second-note passages develop in the upper register of the piano, limiting the tempo at which it can reasonably be taken. The entire movement ends with a coda, where, according to Charles Rosen, Beethoven 'decides to normalize the rhythm of the main theme, and make it no longer witty but expressive.' The closing two bars consist of a quiet, quick turn in the treble.

=== II. Andante ===
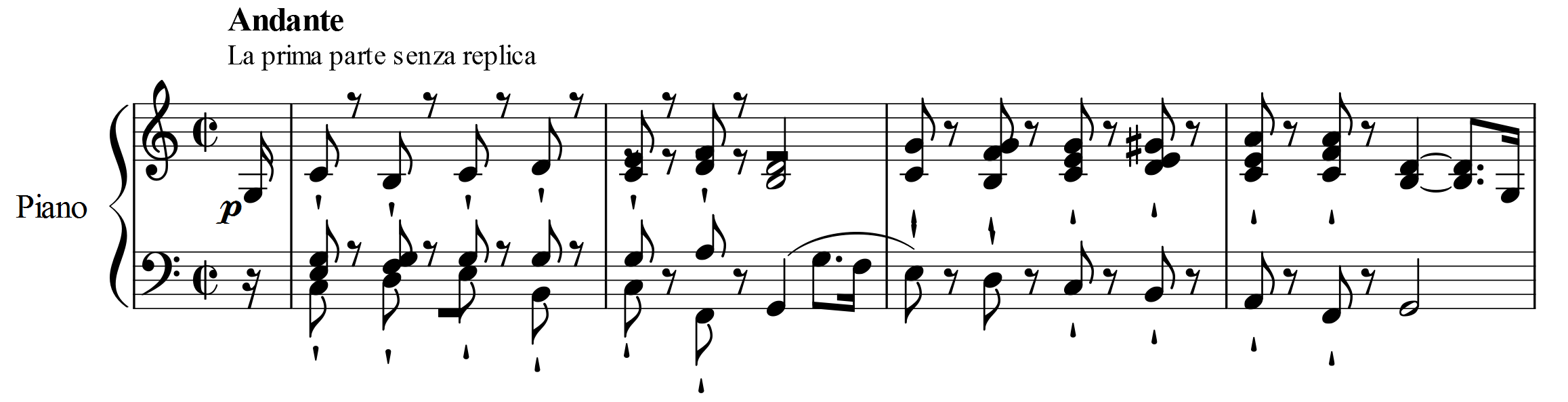

The second movement is a set of variations on a disjunct, chordal theme which is marked "La prima parte senza replica" (first part without repeats). The form of the music is Theme with Three Variations. It seems about to end quietly, like the first and last movements, but then concludes abruptly with a crashing fortissimo C major chord.

=== III. Scherzo: Allegro assai ===
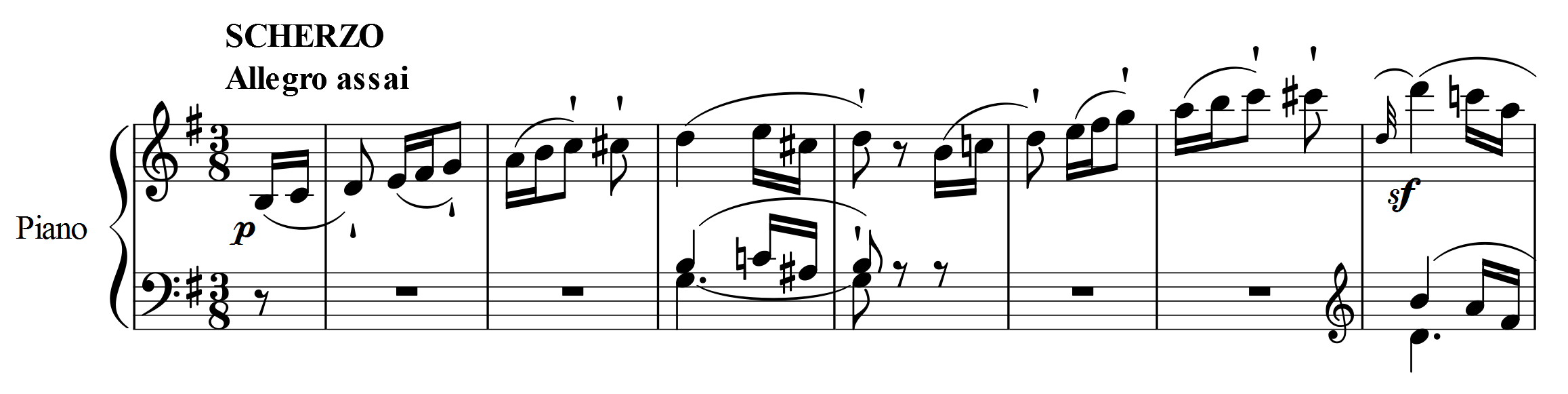

Like the first movement, the third movement opens with an ascending, hesitant, three-note motif that conveys considerable rhythmic ambiguity. In his book, The Music Instinct, the science writer Philip Ball singles out this theme as an example of the classic trick of disguising 'one rhythmic structure as another'. The movement, which is in 3/8 time, is a Scherzo in rondo form. The main theme undergoes many changes, until the end, where it ends quietly, on the very lowest notes of the piano of Beethoven's time. The movement plays with listener expectations through rhythmic ambiguity, unexpected harmonic shifts, and above all, the use of strategically placed silences. All of these characteristic examples of musical wit show the continuing influence of Haydn on Beethoven at this early stage in his composing career.
