= Prelude and Fugue in B-flat minor, BWV 891 =

Keyboard composition by Johann Sebastian Bach

Prelude and fugue, played on a piano

The Prelude and Fugue in B♭ minor, BWV 891, is a keyboard composition by Johann Sebastian Bach. It is the 22nd prelude and fugue in the second book of The Well-Tempered Clavier (WTC), a series of 48 preludes and fugues by the composer. It was composed in 1738.

== Prelude ==
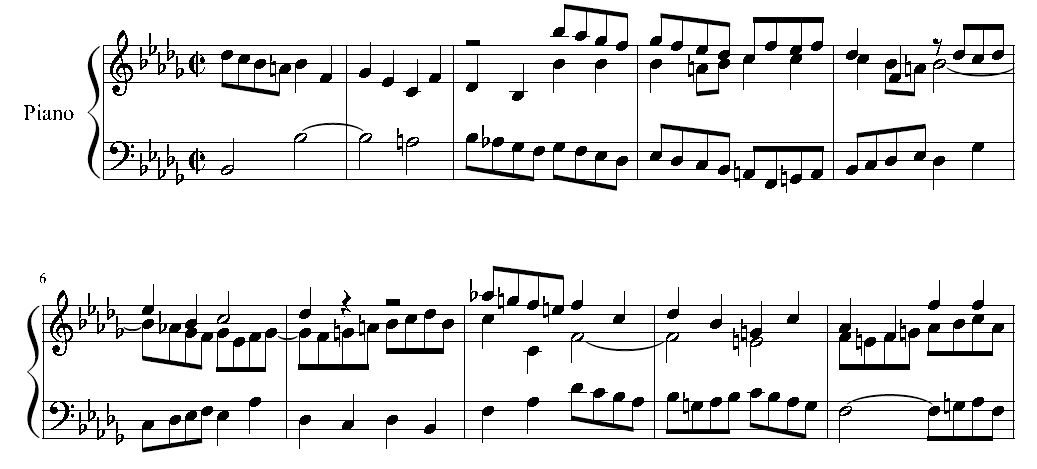
Prelude incipit

The prelude is in cut time and has 83 measures. It is made up mainly of eighth notes, quarter notes, half notes and whole notes.

== Fugue ==
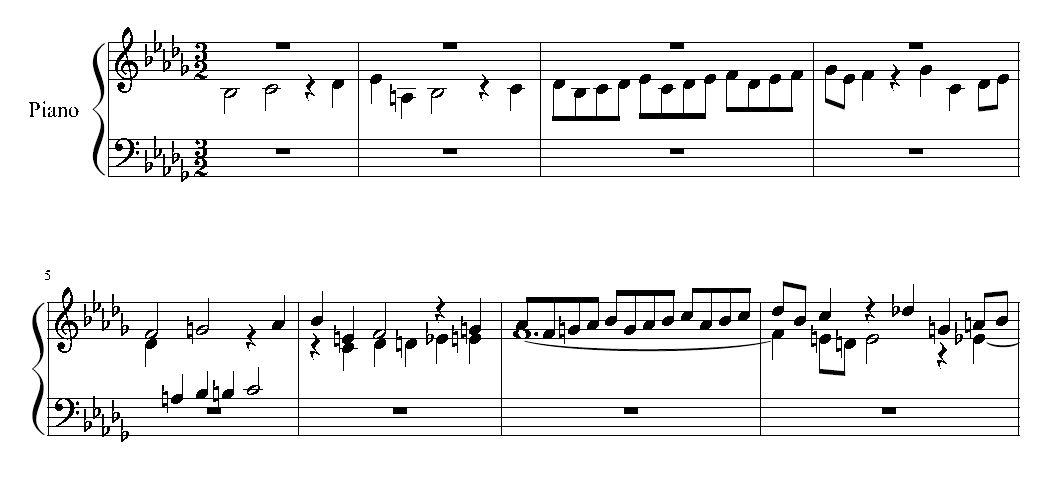
Fugue incipit

The fugue is in 3/2 time and has 101 measures and four voices. It is made up mainly of eighth notes, half notes, dotted half notes, quarter notes, whole notes, and dotted whole notes. Glenn Gould said it is one of his favorite fugues, along with F♯ minor fugue, BWV 883, and E major fugue, BWV 878, also from the second book of The Well-Tempered Clavier.
