= Piano Sonata No. 2 (Hindemith) =

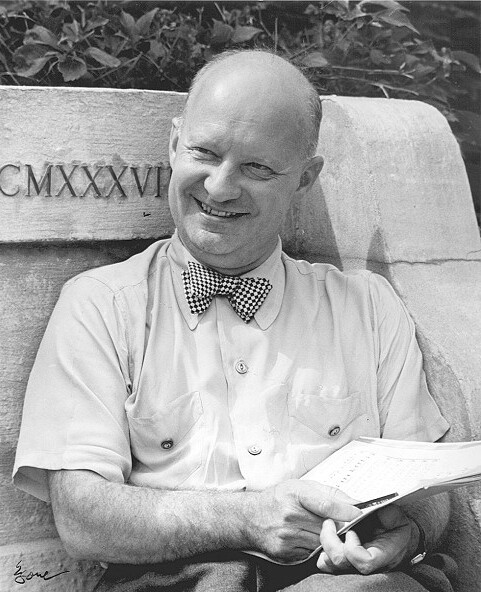
Paul Hindemith during the 1940s

The Piano Sonata No. 2 in G major by Paul Hindemith was composed in 1936. A typical performance lasts 13 minutes. The shortest of his three piano sonatas, Hindemith thought of this sonata as a sonatina, and its writing is considered to be accessible even to amateurs.

== Structure ==
The sonata is in three movements:

1. Mäßig schnell
2. Lebhaft
3. Sehr langsam – Rondo: Bewegt
