= Fantasia No. 3 (Mozart) =

1782 piano composition by W. A. Mozart

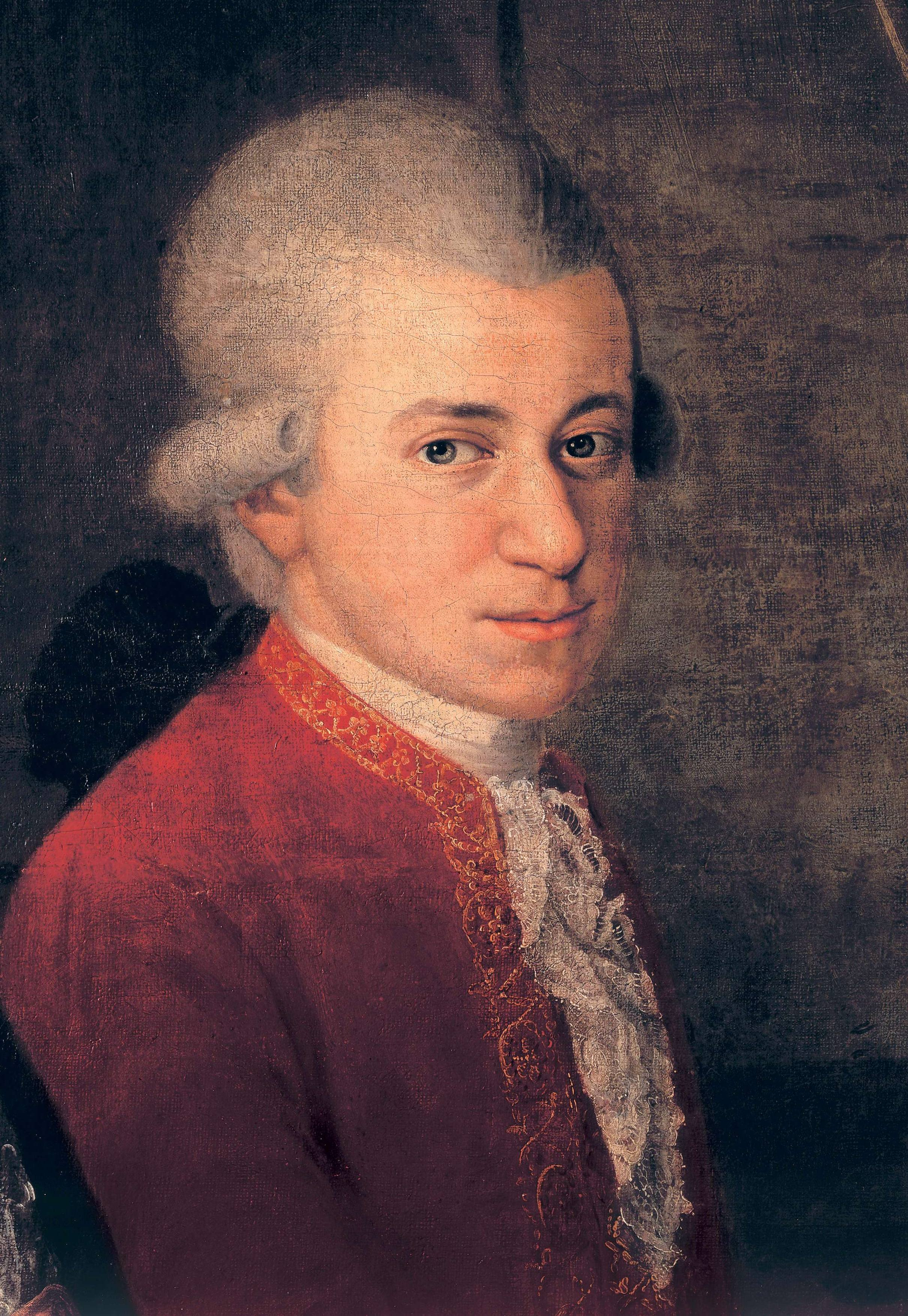
Detail of Wolfgang from the 1780–81 Portrait of the Mozart Family

Fantasia No. 3 in D minor, K. 397/385g (Fantasy in English, Fantasie in German) is a piece of music for solo piano composed by Wolfgang Amadeus Mozart in 1782. Despite the fact it was finished by another composer, the piece is nonetheless one of his more popular compositions for the piano.

The original manuscript has not survived and the final measures of the piece have been lost or were never completed by Mozart. The ending as it currently exists (the last 10 measures) is believed to have been written by August Eberhard Müller, one of the composer's admirers. For her Philips Records recording, pianist Mitsuko Uchida has written her own ending that is similar to the piece's beginning, rather than using Müller's.

== Structure ==
Fantasia in D minor, K. 397

The Fantasia runs to just over 100 measures, in a single multi-tempo movement marked Andante – Adagio – Presto – Tempo primo – Presto – Tempo primo – Allegretto, and a full performance takes approximately five or six minutes.

The Austrian composer and academic Gerhard Präsent has published an extensive analysis of the Fantasia that reveals highly interesting structural correlations between the different parts of the composition. He has also made an arrangement for string quartet in four movements, called the Fantasy Quartet in D, in which this piece is the first movement.
