= Piano Sonata No. 16 (Beethoven) =

1802 sonata by Ludwig van Beethoven

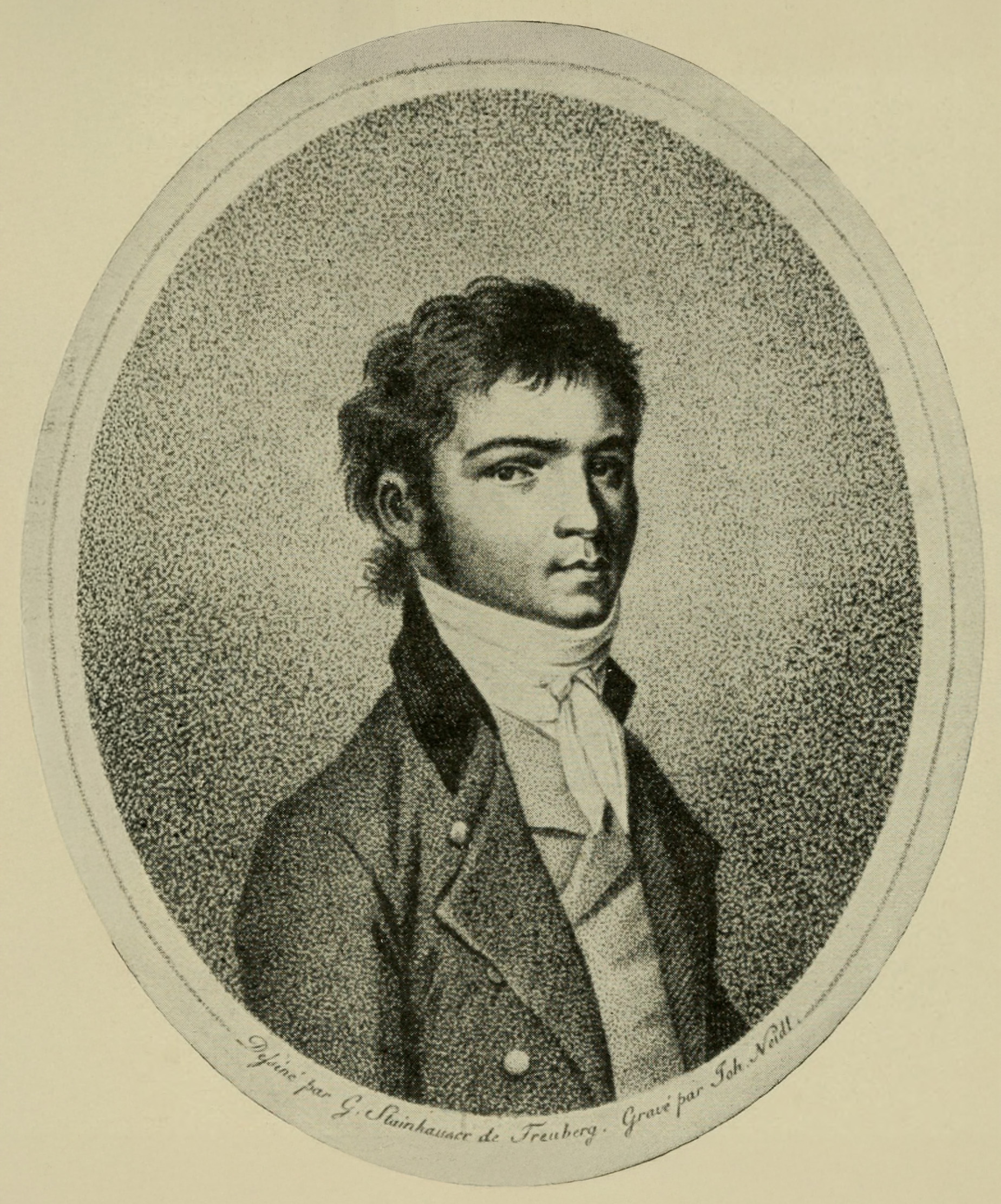
1801 engraving by Johann Joseph Neidl after a now-lost portrait by Gandolph Ernst Stainhauser von Treuberg, ca. 1800

Ludwig van Beethoven's Piano Sonata No. 16 in G major, Op. 31, No. 1, was composed between 1801 and 1802. Although it was numbered as the first piece in the trio of piano sonatas which were published as Opus 31 in 1803, Beethoven actually finished it after the Op. 31 No. 2, the Tempest Sonata.

Due to his dissatisfaction with the classical style of music, Beethoven pledged to take a new path of musical composition and style. The Opus 31 works are the first examples of the new and unconventional ideas Beethoven adopted in an attempt to make a name for himself. For example, in the first movement, unlike most sonata allegro forms in which the second theme of the exposition is dominant, the second theme is in B major and B minor, the mediant of the original key. Beethoven would later continue to use the mediant and submediant as expositional goals for major-key sonata-form movements, such as the first movements of the Waldstein and Hammerklavier sonatas, the Archduke trio, the triple concerto and the thirteenth string quartet, as well as the finale to the seventh symphony. These pieces were written after Beethoven's Heiligenstadt Testament of 1802.

This sonata is light and breezy and has touches of humour and irony in its movements. Critics say that the Opus 31 works show a more pronounced "Beethovenian" sense of style that became more evident in his later, mature works.

== Music ==
I. Allegro vivace

II. Adagio grazioso

III. Rondo
Played by Artur Schnabel in 1932

The sonata consists of three movements. A typical performance lasts about 20 minutes.

1. Allegro vivace 2/4 in G major
2. Adagio grazioso 9/8 in C major
3. Rondo, allegretto – presto 2/2 in G major

=== I. Allegro vivace ===
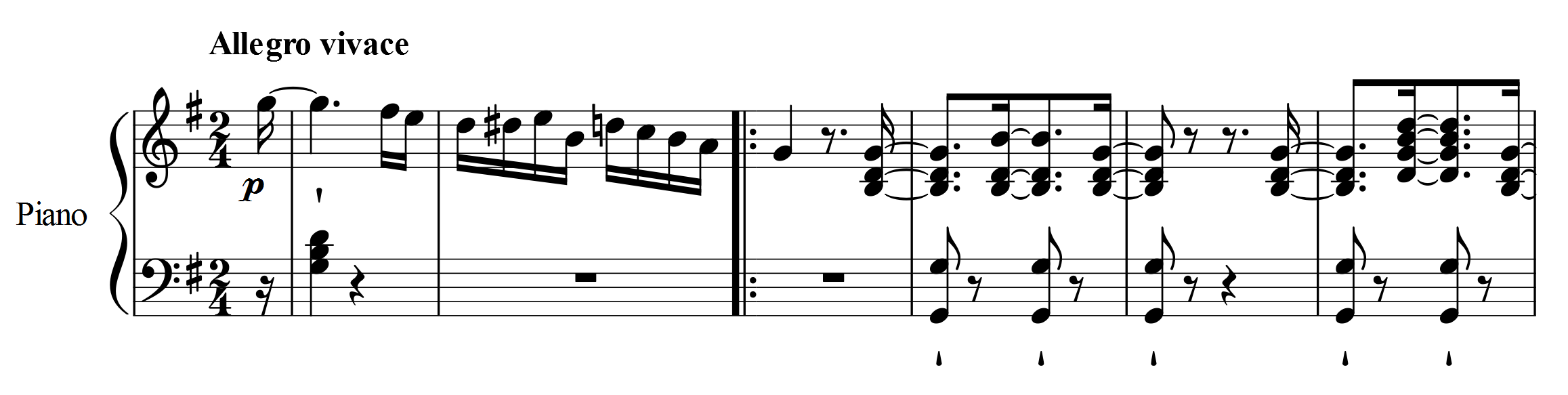

The first movement begins in an animated fashion. The humorous main theme is littered with brisk, semiquaver passages, and chords written in a stuttering fashion, suggesting that the hands are unable to play in unison with one another. The second subject in the exposition alternates between B major and B minor; this tendency to alternate between keys became typical later in Beethoven's career.

=== II. Adagio grazioso ===
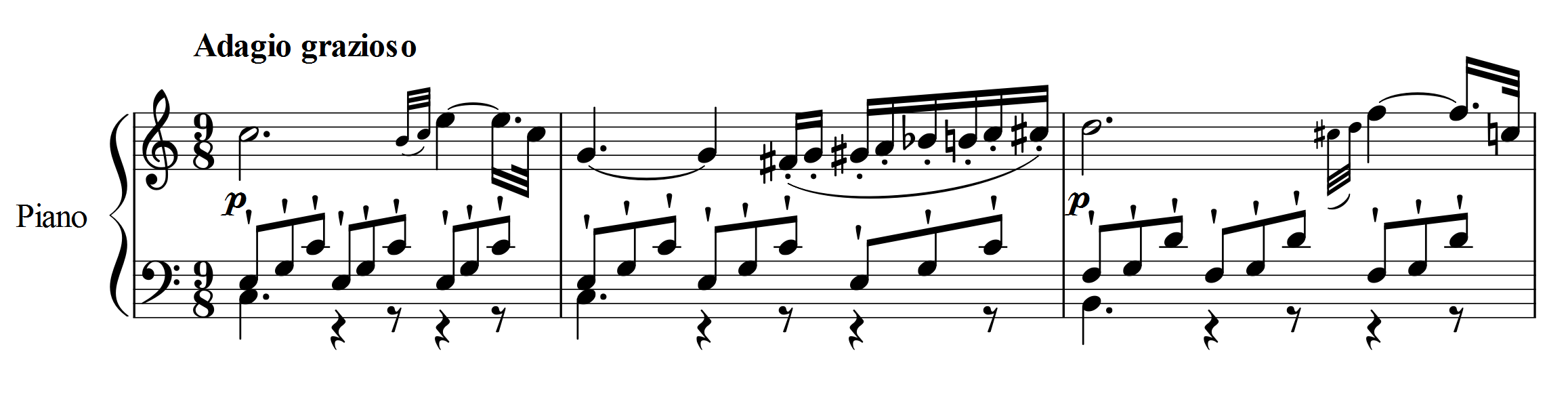

With long, drawn-out trills and reflective pauses, the second movement in C major is more sentimental. Lasting around 11 minutes, this is the third longest slow movement in Beethoven's piano sonatas, after the Hammerklavier Sonata's Adagio sostenuto third movement and the 32nd sonata's second movement. According to many great pianists (e.g. Edwin Fischer and András Schiff), this movement is a parody of Italian opera and Beethoven's contemporaries, who were much more popular than Beethoven at the beginning of the 19th century. Schiff explained this theory in a master class on this sonata; he said it is totally uncharacteristic of Beethoven because it is not economical, it is incredibly long, everything is too ornamented, it is filled with "show-off cadenzas [...] trying to make a cheap effect" and bel canto-like elements and rhythms. Schiff said, "it's very beautiful, but it's alien to Beethoven's nature".

=== III. Rondo ===
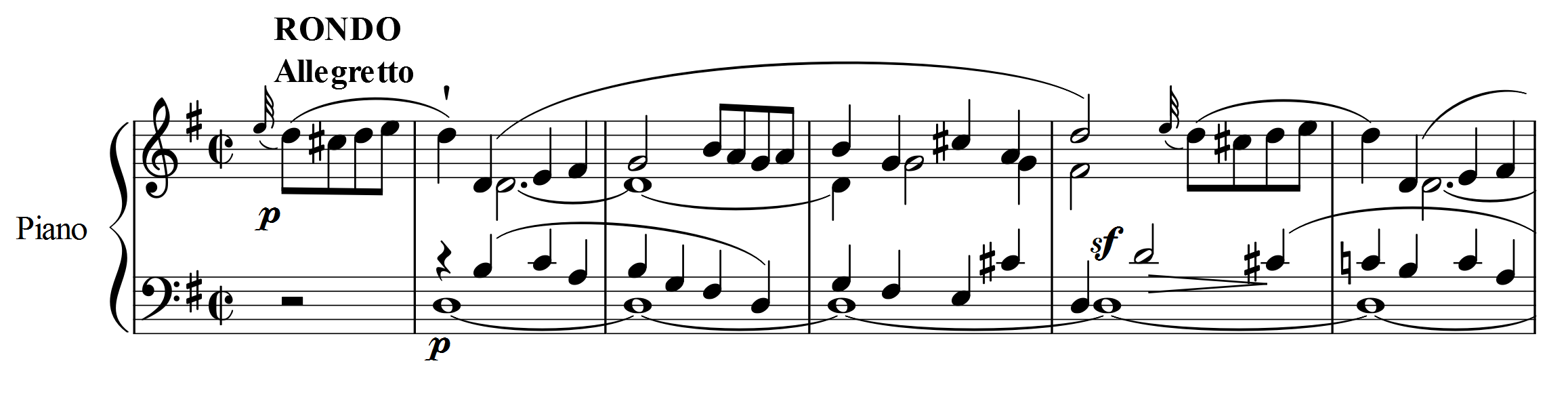

The last movement is similar in character to the first: light, enthusiastic, and youthful. Here, a single simple theme is varied, ornamented, syncopated, and modulated throughout the piece. After a brief Adagio section, the piece ends with a Presto coda.
