= Prelude and Fugue in F-sharp minor, BWV 883 =

Composition by J. S. Bach

The Prelude and Fugue in F♯ minor, BWV 883, is the fourteenth piece of the second book of The Well-Tempered Clavier by Johann Sebastian Bach, compiled between 1739 and 1744.

== Prelude ==
The prelude, written in 3/4 and comprising 43 measures, is noted for its serene character.

It is written in three voices and takes the form of an arioso structured in sonata form, with the first section ending on a fermata. A brief transitional passage in the bass at measure 29 leads to a restatement of the theme in the tonic. The final measure ends with a Picardy third featuring A♯.

The alternation of duple and triple rhythmic patterns—superimposed only in measure 15—has been compared to similar techniques in the Benedictus of the Mass in B minor and in the allemande of the Partita in D major (BWV 828).

== Fugue ==
The three-voice fugue is written in and consists of 70 measures.

Ferruccio Busoni described the fugue as exhibiting "a marvelous youth" despite the depth of experience it conveys, noting the balance between intellect and expression. Characteristic of Bach's mature style, the fugue is a highly developed work distinguished by its clarity of conception and texture.

It is the only triple fugue in the volume, paralleling Bach's use of a five-voice fugue in the first book. The principal subject is combined with two additional countersubjects at measures 55, 60, and 67. The subject consists of fifteen notes built entirely on disjunct intervals—a descending tonic arpeggio followed by a leap of a sixth—with three sequential patterns that become obscured once the answer enters. These sequences are fully articulated when combined with the second countersubject, which is written in continuous sixteenth notes.

After the exposition (measure 11), the fugue proceeds with a first episode in which Bach combines the subject with inversions of its opening motif: first in its original form (measures 9–10), then in inversion (measures 10–12), followed by a combination of both (measures 13–15).

The first countersubject appears in measure 20. It is brief and is immediately treated in canonic imitation. In the second episode, Bach combines this countersubject in canon with an inversion of its opening motif (soprano) and the subject (alto in measure 29, then bass in measure 34). In the Schwencke manuscript copy, a mordent is placed on the second note, emphasizing the entry of this new thematic element within the contrapuntal texture.

The second countersubject appears in measure 36, during the double exposition, and remains present throughout the central section of the fugue. It is treated in combination with itself and with the inversion of the subject's opening motif.

During the counter-exposition (measure 51), the subject is introduced in the alto, after which the counterpoint alternates among the three thematic elements. This section forms a structural climax in which the subject, first and second countersubjects are successively superimposed in varying voice combinations—soprano, bass, and alto—while retaining their distinct identities.

== Manuscripts ==
The manuscripts considered the most important are written either by Bach himself or by Anna Magdalena. They are:

- Source "A", British Library, London (Add. MS. 35 021), compiled between 1739 and 1742. It contains 21 pairs of preludes and fugues; those in C minor, D major, and F minor (nos. 4, 5, and 12) are missing, having been lost.
- Source "B",” Berlin State Library (P 430), a copy dated 1744 by Johann Christoph Altnickol. In his copy, Altnickol replaces measures 7 and 8, written in triplets, with a triplet figure.

== Legacy ==
Théodore Dubois produced a four-hand piano version of the work, published in 1914.

Heitor Villa-Lobos arranged the prelude for a cello orchestra at the request of violinist Antonio Lysy; the arrangement was published by Max Eschig. In this version, Villa-Lobos positions Prelude No. 22 first and alternates four fugues with two other preludes: Fugue No. 5 (Book 1), Prelude No. 14, Fugue No. 1 (Book 1), Prelude and Fugue No. 8 (Book 1), and Fugue No. 21 (Book 1).
