= Prelude and Fugue in E-flat minor, BWV 853 =

Keyboard composition by Johann Sebastian Bach

The Prelude and Fugue in E♭ minor, BWV 853 is the eighth pair of preludes and fugues in the first book of The Well-Tempered Clavier by Johann Sebastian Bach, compiled around 1722. After the cheerful lightness of E♭ major, Bach reserves the first tragic encounter in his harmonic journey for E♭ minor.

The prelude, marked by a meditative character, introduces a fugue of considerable complexity, employing techniques such as canon and augmentation, similar to those found in The Art of Fugue. The fugue appears in the enharmonic key of D♯ minor, although some editions present it in both D♯ minor and its enharmonic equivalent, E♭ minor.

The two books of The Well-Tempered Clavier are widely regarded by composers and educators as important reference works. First circulated in manuscript form among musicians and later published in the early 19th century, they have been used both for the enjoyment of listeners and as foundational material in the study of keyboard technique and composition since their creation.

== Background ==
The Well-Tempered Clavier is often cited as one of the most significant works in classical music. It has been considered a key reference by composers and musicians such as Joseph Haydn, Mozart, Beethoven, Robert Schumann, Frédéric Chopin, Richard Wagner, César Franck, Max Reger, Gabriel Fauré, Claude Debussy, Maurice Ravel, Igor Stravinsky, and Charles Koechlin, among others, whether as performers or admirers. Hans von Bülow notably referred to it as a foundational work, describing it as the Old Testament of music, in parallel with Beethoven's thirty-two sonatas, which he referred to as the New Testament.

The scores, unpublished during Bach's lifetime, initially circulated as manuscript copies shared among musicians—his children, students, and colleagues—until the late 18th century, already attracting attention. Their broader dissemination began with publication in the early 19th century, after which they became common in the repertoires of both amateur pianists and professional musicians, and were occasionally performed in concert settings. For instance, Chopin is known to have played selections from the work privately before public performances. Since Bach's time, the collection has served as a tool for keyboard training and instruction in composition and fugue writing. The music contained in these volumes is both pedagogical and musically engaging, notably due to the diversity, structure, and craftsmanship it presents.

Each book consists of twenty-four diptychs (preludes and fugues), exploring all major and minor keys in chromatic order. The term "tempered" (as in Well-Tempered Scale) refers to the tuning of keyboard instruments, which must temper fifths (flattening them slightly so that D♭ becomes the same as C♯) to modulate into distant keys—just like modern tuning systems. Thus, the instrument can play in all keys. Bach consequently explored tonalities that were virtually unused in his time, opening new harmonic horizons.

The preludes exhibit inventiveness and resemble improvisation, drawing on traditions such as the toccata, invention, or arpeggiated prelude. The fugues, while structured, are treated with expressiveness rather than rigidity. They encompass a broad spectrum of moods, emotions, forms, and structures, suggesting joy, calm, intensity, or melancholy, and present a varied and human musical landscape. Some incorporate multiple contrapuntal techniques—such as stretto, inversion, or canon—while others do not, reflecting an approach marked by flexibility rather than systematic design. This contrasts with the more methodical character of The Art of Fugue, a later work composed entirely in D minor.

== Prelude ==
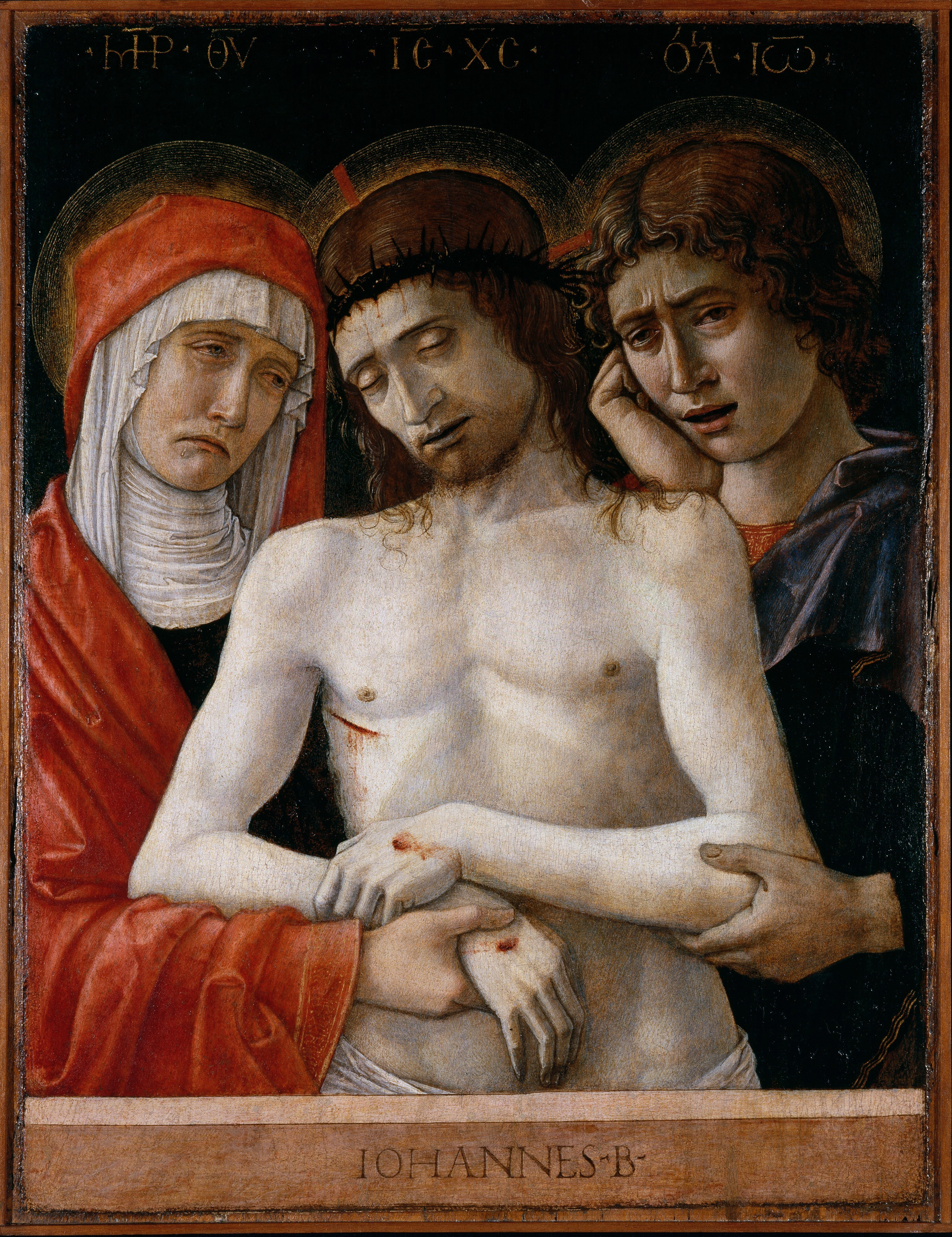
Giovanni Bellini, Pietà of Bergamo (c. 1455).

This pair—prelude and fugue—is considered "one of the most beautiful" and "most moving." "A new masterpiece", "among the most admirable" in the collection, it is "one of Bach's greatest keyboard works". The prelude is also included in the Little Keyboard Book for Wilhelm Friedemann, whose compilation began in 1720. The rare key of E♭ minor is described as follows by Schubart:

« Empfindungen der Bangigkeit des allertiefsten Seelendrangs ; der hinbrütenden Verzweifha ; der schwärzesten Schwermuth, der düstersten Seelenverfassung. Jede Angst, jedes Zagen des schaudernden Herzens, athmet aus dem gräfslichen Es moll. Wenn Gespenster sprechen konnten ; so sprächen sie ungefähr aus diesem Tone. »	"Feelings of the anguish of the deepest soul's torment; of brooding despair; of the blackest melancholy, the darkest mental state. Every anxiety, every faltering of the shuddering heart breathes out of the noble E-flat minor. If ghosts could speak, they would speak approximately in this tone."

The prelude, notated 3/2, consists of 40 measures.

It is a deeply meditative, inward song, halfway between recitative-arioso and nocturne, with an extremely rich harmonic diversity. The piece calms down in the final bars, dying away in an atmosphere of mystery.

Few composers have conveyed such depth of sentiment using minimal means and straightforward expression as Bach does in this piece. Music critic Cecil Gray interpreted the prelude as a kind of postlude, suggesting a reflection after a tragic event—citing the phrase "It is finished" (John 19:30)—or as a musical equivalent of a Pietà.

The descending tritones evoke the adagio of the Toccata for organ in C major, BWV 564.

The German harpsichordist Alexander Weimann draws connections between many elements of the ending (notated Adagio) of Alessandro Scarlatti's Toccata d'ottava stesa in D minor and this prelude.

According to Keller, the tempo is around 44 beats per minute, a notion confirmed by Badura-Skoda, who notes: "The tempo must not be too slow."

The presence of arpeggio signs, many of which are absent in the autograph manuscript (P 415), do appear in other copies (P 202 and P 203), and invite a free style of "arpeggiation".

== Fugue ==
The three-voice fugue, notated, is 87 measures long.

The manuscript associates the prelude in E♭ minor with the fugue in D♯ minor, for transpositional convenience: Bach, according to Spitta (confirmed notably by Tovey, Keller), wrote the fugue in D♯ minor, and it was enough for him to change the key signature (as he had already done for the fugue in C♯ major). Most modern sources, including editions, now use E♭ minor, for the sake of tonal unity; or include both, as in Franz Kroll's edition (1820–1877), included as an appendix by Peters.

This fugue is considered one of the most representative of The Well-Tempered Clavier and is described as being of "astonishing complexity", worthy of The Art of Fugue. Speaking of it, Karl Geiringer cites Goethe's phrase about his experience of Bach: "eternal harmony conversing with itself". Alberto Basso, for his part, labels it a "fugue-ricercar", emphasizing its scholarly nature. Bach employs three contrapuntal techniques on a subject that is sufficiently monotonous to blend into itself in canons, then to be inverted, transmuted, and finally broadened and presented bathed in a spirit of peace, as though outside of time. All this in a writing style that remains transparent and deeply moving.

The subject resembles Gregorian plainchant. It comprises two parts, each consisting of a small leap—a fifth, then a fourth—followed by a descending stepwise motion. This structure articulates according to the rhythmic pattern ♩ ♩ ♪ of the "head" and its "tail".

Alternatively, it is also possible to analyze it differently, highlighting two fifths—one ascending, the other descending—followed by a short tail of stepwise notes. Ultimately, this subject is combined only with itself in the fugue: there is no established countersubject.

The melodic outline of the subject closely resembles the chorale Aus tiefer Not schrei ich zu dir (From deep distress I cry to You), based on Psalm 130, as adapted by Luther (Erfurter Enchiridion, 1524). The chorale also contains a minor sixth, a symbol of distress and divine abandonment. Taken together, the intervals of fifth – minor sixth – fifth were referred to in the Baroque as pathopoiétique, meaning causing suffering.

The fugue features six entry groups, each exploiting or combining one of the contrapuntal techniques, based on the subject in three approximately equal sections (measures 1–29, 30–61, 61–87).

The exposition (alto, soprano, bass; measures 1–11) is followed by the first episode (measures 12–29). It begins with the answer in the bass, an octave lower, creating the impression of a fourth voice. A canon at the octave, separated by two beats (measure 19), is followed by two other entries, one being a three-voice canon at the lower fifth (measure 24)—with some liberties: the subject is rhythmically altered. Meanwhile, Bach modulates to F-sharp major, then curiously to A-sharp minor (measure 19), avoiding F-sharp major for a "psychological reason", in this "depiction of suffering".

The second episode (measures 30–51) is devoted to the inversion of the subject—first presented in the soprano, alto, and bass—then this inversion is developed in canon (bass–soprano, then alto–soprano), with measures 47–50 modeled directly on measures 24–27. Despite the three formal sections, a two-part structure becomes evident midway through, when Bach, just before the inverted canons—having returned to the main key at the start of measure 44—inserts two half rests.

Following a perfect logic, combining the two previous techniques, the third episode (measures 52–61) explores the three-voice canon on the head of the subject, offset by one beat: first rectus (original form), then inversus (inverted form), all compressed into four measures (52 and 54). The subject returns in the soprano (measure 57), preparing for new combinations in the fourth episode (measures 62 to the end).

Surpassing all that had come before, what now appears interwoven are the subject itself (rectus), its inversion (inversus, measure 44, exactly at the midpoint of the fugue), and an augmentation (measure 61). The voices present the augmentation from the bass to the soprano (measures 62 to 83), counterpointed by the rectus subject in the other voices in canon, the first time with the inversus entrusted to the soprano. There are eleven appearances of the subject and its transformations in these twenty-one measures. Measure 77 is the most complex to execute for the performer: the theme is in the bass, an augmentation in dotted quarter notes in the alto, and half notes and quarter notes in the soprano. Bach ends the work with a march leading to a major chord topped with a fermata. This final major chord can be interpreted as a "symbol of salvation".

This last section, "the goal and the summit of the fugue|, far surpasses mere virtuosity in contrapuntal art: "The appropriate harmonies seem to fall into place of their own accord. This culmination virtually exhausts the expressive content of the fugue..." Bach, as poet and architect, seeks here to evoke a dimension of spiritual grandeur, which it is also found in the "atmosphere of intense meditation" of the Credo in the Mass in B Minor, certain cantatas—BWV 77 (1723), where the music carries the text These are the Ten Holy Commandments, or BWV 80 (1724)—and the organ fugue in C major, BWV 547.

Highlighting of the canon in measure 77, where three rhythmic states of the subject appear.

== Connections ==
The relationships between the prelude and the fugue are not hard to perceive: the little melody at the very beginning outlines exactly the opening notes of the fugue subject, then appears transformed in the answer (a fourth higher) and reappears here and there, for example, precipitated in sixteenth notes, but with the leap of a fifth, in measure 12.

== Genesis ==
The prelude appears in Wilhelm Friedemann Bach's little book (no. 23), but notated at 3/4. In the final version, it is measured at 3/2 , in order to reinforce its character.

== Legacy ==
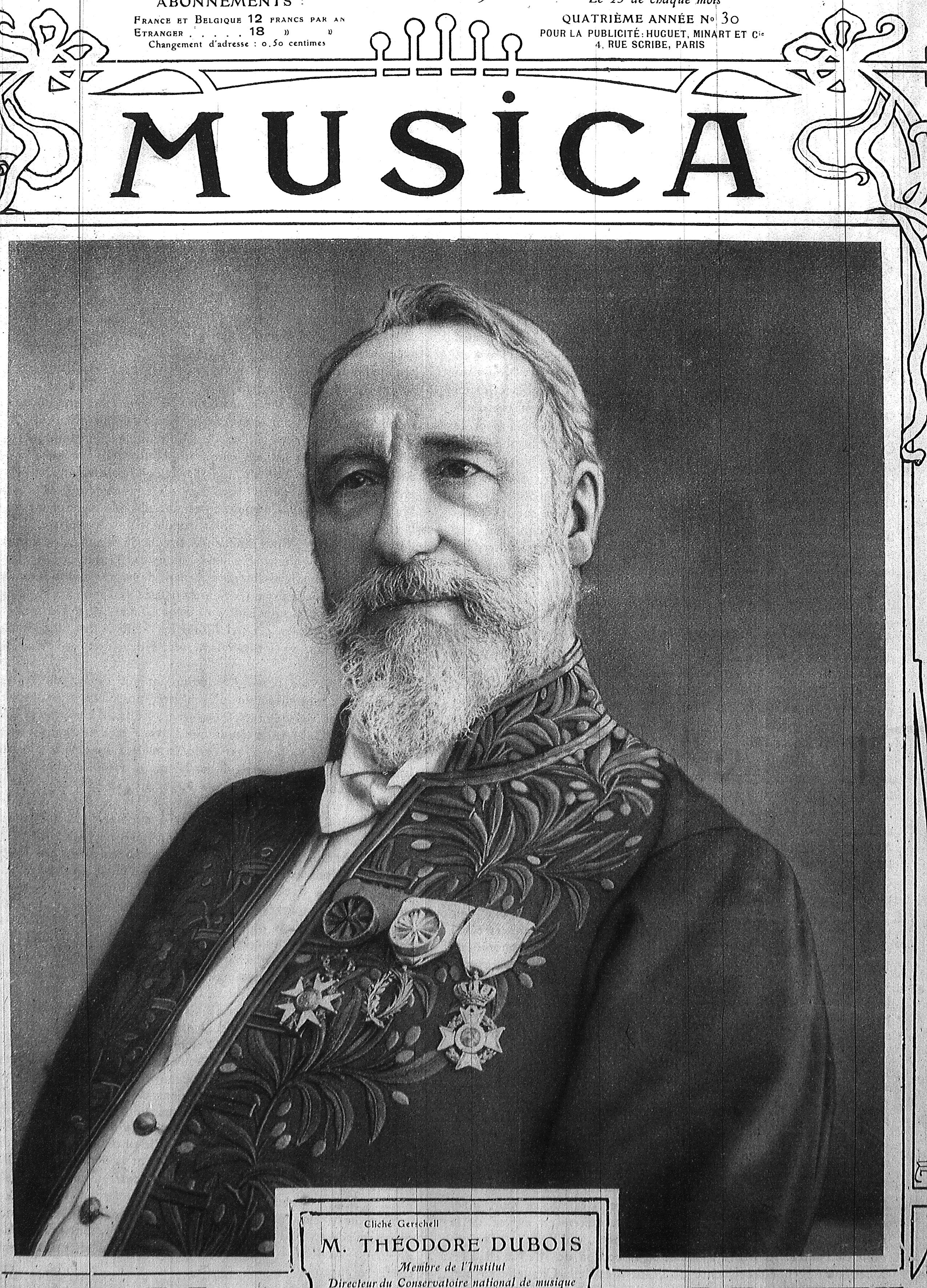
T. Dubois, academician, on the cover of Musica magazine.

Théodore Dubois created a version for four hands, published in 1914.

In the 1920s, Leopold Stokowski created an orchestral arrangement of the prelude, which he recorded notably with the Philadelphia Orchestra in 1927 (HMV D1464) and one last time in September 1972 with the London Symphony Orchestra (Decca). The arpeggios are generally carried by the harp, over singing strings.

In 1951, Zoltán Kodály produced a transcription of the Prelude and Fugue pair for cello and piano, recorded notably by Julius Berger and Miklós Perényi.

Heitor Villa-Lobos arranged this pair of prelude and fugue for a cello orchestra at the request of violinist Antonio Lysy and published it through Max Eschig. He placed Prelude No. 22 first and alternated four fugues with two other preludes: Fugue No. 5 (Book I), Prelude No. 14 (Book II), Fugue No. 1 (Book I), the present pair of Prelude and Fugue No. 8 (the only one in the series to remain complete), and Fugue No. 21 (Book I).

== See also ==
- Fugue
- Glossary of music terminology
