= Prelude and Fugue in B minor, BWV 869 =

Keyboard composition by Johann Sebastian Bach

The Prelude and Fugue in B minor, BWV 869 is the 24th and final pair of preludes and fugues from the first book of The Well-Tempered Clavier by Johann Sebastian Bach, compiled around 1722.

To crown his work, the composer places a grand-scale diptych capable of showcasing his contrapuntal art and musically demonstrating that all keys can be played on a keyboard thanks to a tempered tuning.

The prelude is a trio sonata movement in three voices of Corellian design, evoking a prayer. The four-voice fugue is an immense meditation with the gravity of other works such as the Passions. The entire piece is cited as an example by Kirnberger in his treatise on harmony published in 1773. It has been the subject of various transcriptions for string quartet and quintet or for orchestra.

The two books of The Well-Tempered Clavier are regarded as a benchmark by numerous composers and pedagogues. First copied by musicians, then published in the early 19th century, they serve, in addition to the music lover's pleasure, as material for studying keyboard practice and the art of composition since the 18th century.

== Context ==
The Well-Tempered Clavier is considered one of the most important works in classical music. It is regarded as a reference by Joseph Haydn, Mozart, Beethoven, Robert Schumann, Frédéric Chopin, Richard Wagner, César Franck, Max Reger, Gabriel Fauré, Claude Debussy, Maurice Ravel, Igor Stravinsky, Charles Koechlin, and many others—both performers and admirers. Hans von Bülow considered it a precious monument and called it the Old Testament, alongside Beethoven's thirty-two sonatas, the New Testament.

The scores, unpublished during the composer's lifetime, were initially transmitted through manuscripts, copied among musicians (Bach's children and students, colleagues, etc.) up until the late 18th century, already enjoying considerable success. Thanks to publication starting in the early 19th century, their distribution widened. They came to sit on the music stands of amateur pianists and professional musicians, and were performed in concert—for example, Chopin would play a page for himself before his public appearances. From Bach's time to the present day, the work has been used for keyboard practice and teaching the art of composition or fugue writing. The music collected in these pages is therefore educational, due to the variety, aesthetics, and mastery of its material.

Each book is composed of twenty-four diptychs (preludes and fugues) that explore all major and minor keys in the chromatic scale. The term "well-tempered" (as in well-tempered scale) refers to the tuning of keyboard instruments, which, to modulate to distant keys, requires slightly narrowing the fifths (for instance, D♭ overlapping with C♭), similar to modern tuning. Thus, the instrument can play in all keys. Bach therefore exploits new tonalities that were unused in his time, opening up new harmonic horizons.

The preludes demonstrate a variety of styles, sometimes approaching improvisation and drawing from traditions such as the toccata, the invention, or the arpeggiated prelude. The fugues exhibit expressive qualities, avoiding the rigid character often attributed to the form. They encompass a wide spectrum of moods, emotions, forms, and structures, alternating between contrasting affects. Some incorporate techniques such as stretto, inversion, or canon, while others do not—suggesting a compositional approach marked by freedom rather than a systematic framework, which Bach would later adopt in The Art of Fugue, composed entirely in D minor.

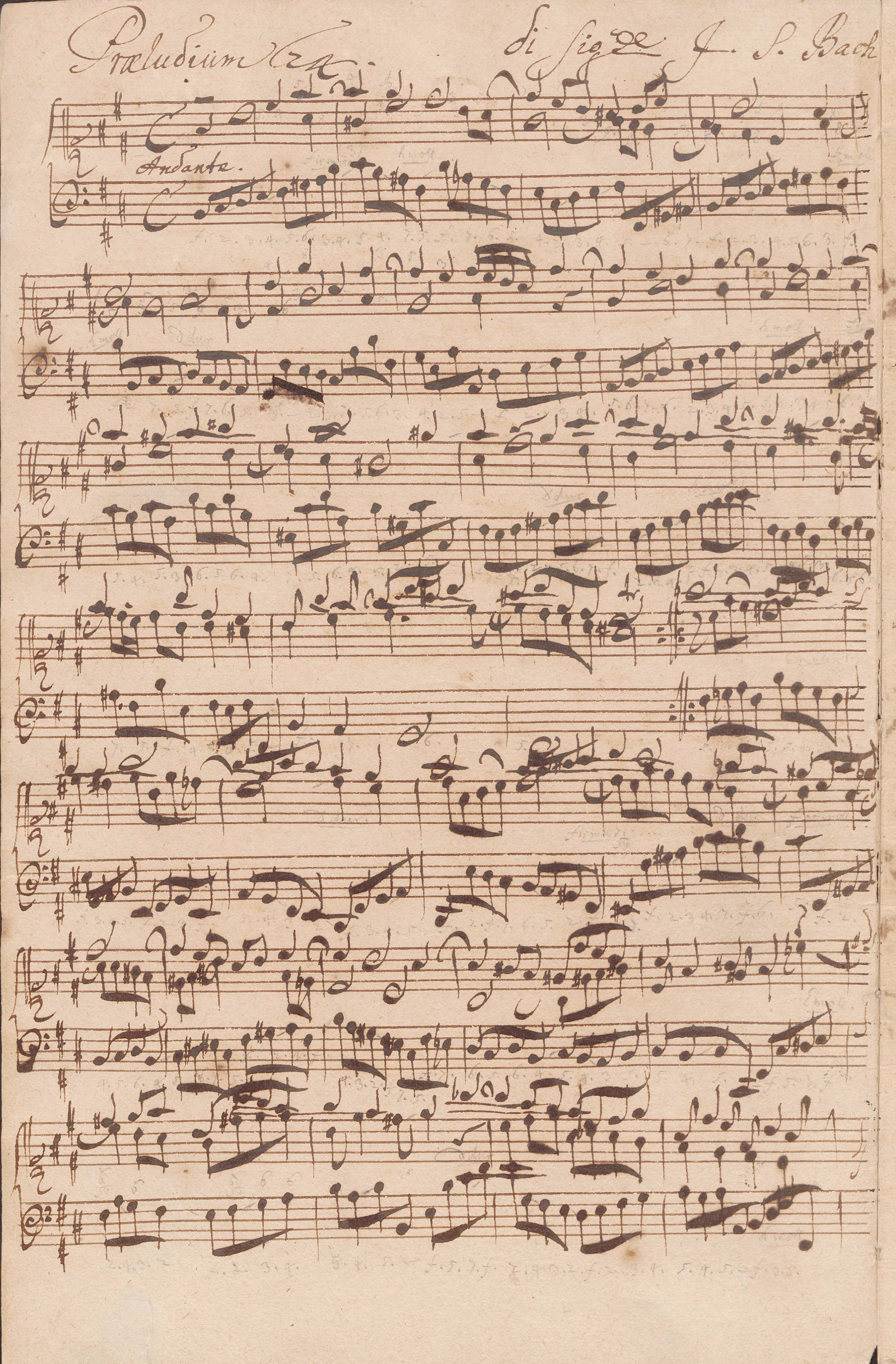
Prelude in B minor, BWV 869. Copy by Bernhard Christian Kayser, c. 1723–1725 (Berlin State Library, manuscript p. 401)

== Prelude ==
The prelude, notated, contains 47 measures.

The piece is often interpreted as having a meditative character, reminiscent of a prayer, and is frequently performed on the organ. It is composed in three voices: the two upper voices intertwine melodically, while the bass provides steady accompaniment in Italian-style eighth notes (croches à l’italienne), typically not played staccato. This is the only prelude in binary form within the collection. The two sections differ in length (17 and 30 measures), and the second part does not include a recapitulation. This structural approach reappears in several preludes of the second book, though without direct reference to the trio sonata style associated with Corelli’s early opus numbers. However, Bach does reuse the motif of a descending fourth in diminution, moving from quarter notes to eighth notes before returning to quarters.

The tempo marking Andante, indicated by Bach in manuscript P 415 (dated either 1742 or later), should not be interpreted in the Romantic sense of a faster pace but rather as a calm tempo (♩= approximately 69), equivalent to Moderato.

Bach establishes a connection between the diatonic character of the prelude and the chromaticism of the fugue's subject, transitioning into a more tense atmosphere through the use of diminished intervals beginning at measure 42 and in the eighth notes of the soprano at measure 46.

== Fugue ==
The fugue, written in four voices and notated in, is 76 measures long.

The first book of The Well-Tempered Clavier concludes with a complex fugue. Its placement at the end of the collection suggests an intentional sense of closure, with structural and expressive elements contributing to a feeling of finality. The fugue's intricate design and thematic development give it a prominent position within the work.

The fugue at the end of The Well-Tempered Clavier shares a sense of grandeur and gravity with some of Bach's most significant works, such as his Passions. The attention given to both the prelude and the fugue reflects Bach's intent to conclude the first book with a piece of exceptional quality. The tempo markings, such as Largo for the fugue, are often omitted in modern scores but can contribute to the piece's expressive depth. The chromatic nature of the subject aligns it with later composers like Wagner, while the angularity of the melody influenced twentieth-century figures like Schoenberg.

The autograph manuscript of the fugue reveals numerous corrections on the first page, indicating that Bach may have been uncertain about the final version of the last movement, underscoring the composer's meticulous approach to the work's conclusion.

The subject of this fugue is noted for its "extraordinary modernity", rich in expression and imbued with a deep sense of sadness. Composed of 21 eighth notes surrounded by descending arpeggios, it contrasts sharply with the hexachord-based subject of the C major fugue that opens the book. The subject explores all twelve chromatic degrees, which aligns with the overarching concept of the wohltemperirt (well-tempered) system. The use of rests to separate motifs, along with the addition of slurs, emphasizes these motifs, further enhancing the emotional depth of the composition.

In Bach's music, chromaticism is often linked to profound emotional expression, particularly to themes of human suffering and, more specifically, the suffering of Christ. The key of B minor frequently carries chiasmus motifs, which are also found in the subject of the fugue in C♯ minor and the prelude (measure 1, notes 3–6 of the alto). This chiastic structure is a key feature of the fugue's subject: framed by descending arpeggios, it begins on the tonic and ends on the dominant. The four groups of four eighth notes echo the chiastic figure associated with B minor in Bach’s works, with this fugue serving as its most developed example.

The use of B minor in Bach's music is symbolic, appearing in various works such as the fugue of the Kyrie in the Mass in B minor, the cantata BWV 150, and the Flute Sonata BWV 1030, as well as in this Prelude and Fugue. The subject of the Kyrie fugue (written later) shares a kinship with the B minor fugue, although the impressive design that both works exhibit is more articulated in the Kyrie than in the keyboard fugue.

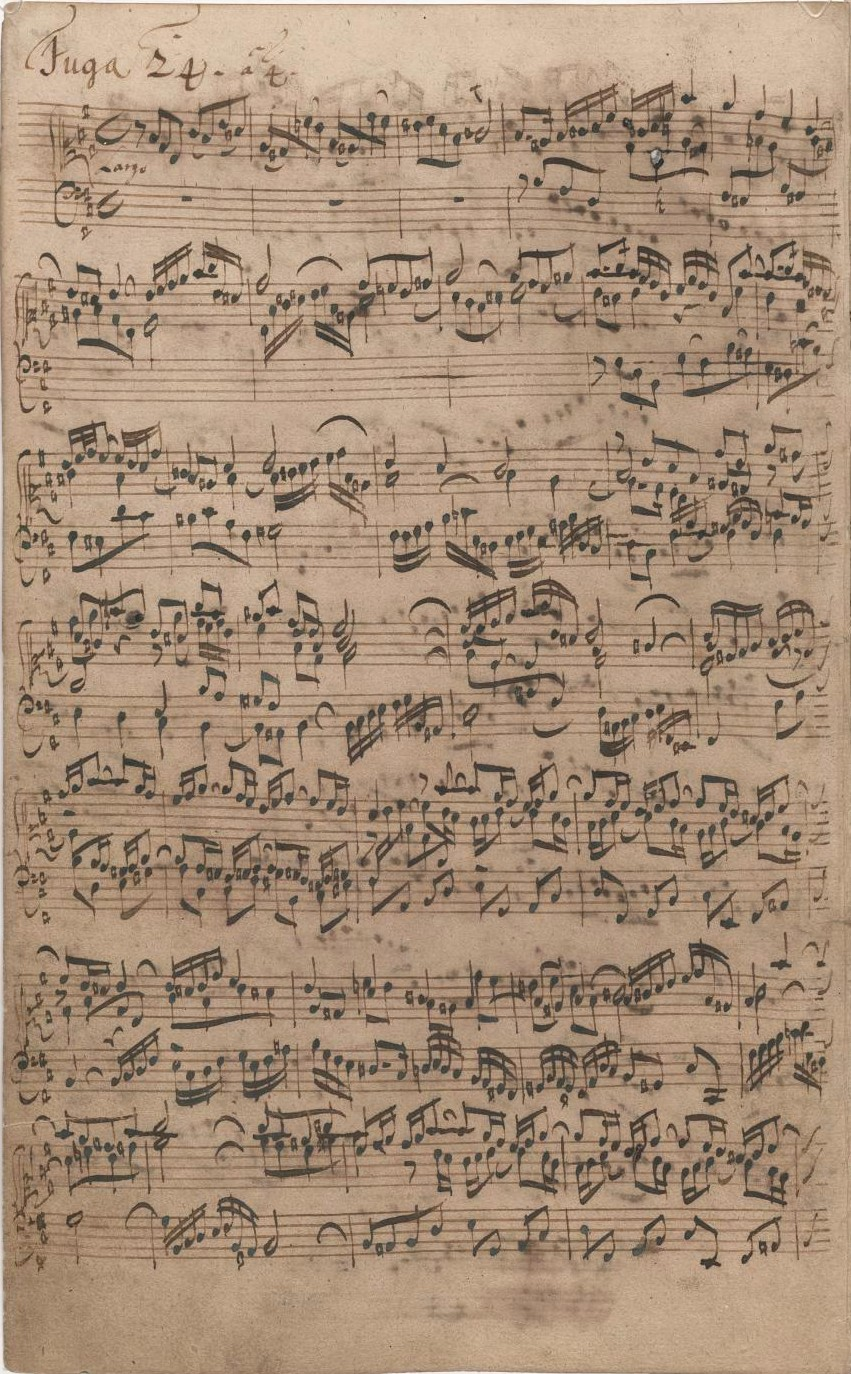
Beginning of the fugue in Bach's hand (Berlin State Library, manuscript p. 415)

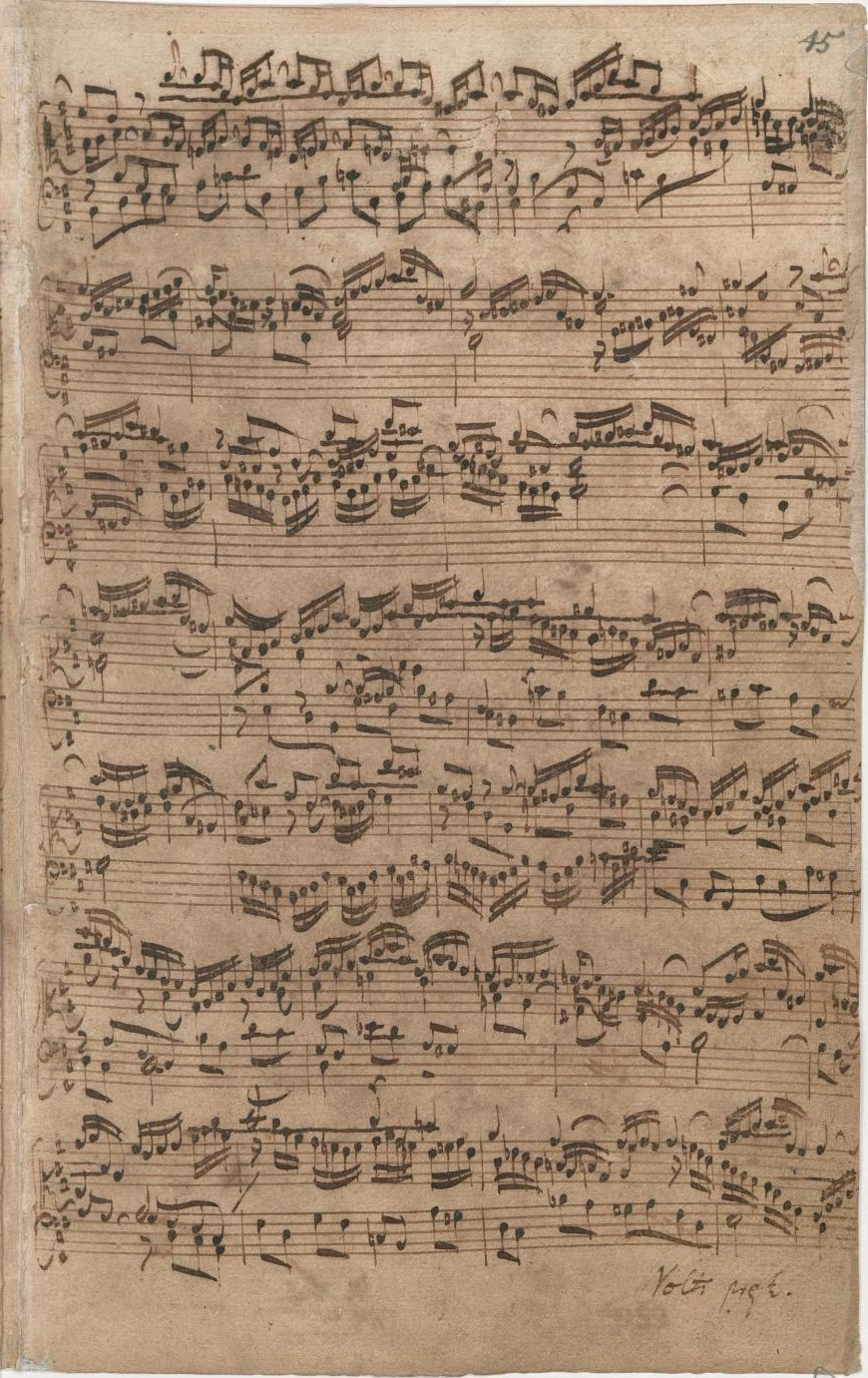
Second page of the fugue

First, there is the very sober countersubject, of the same mood, composed of descending quarter notes that provoke all sorts of harmonic clashes. In measures 38 and 45, it is shortened to four or five notes.

Then, a transitional motif toward the countersubject (or detachable head of the countersubject), which Bach presents in inversion (measures 9, 13, and 39) and in other registers.

Finally, a motif serves as a coda to the countersubject. This small element is charged with preparing the return of the subject and the start of the episodes (measures 12, 15–16, 24–25, 33, 46–47).

The contrapuntal subtleties play little role in the work.

In the second episode, the subject is presented only partially (its first nine notes), in the form of false entries, offset by a measure, resembling a sort of stretto; first in two voices (alto and soprano, measure 34), then in three voices (soprano, alto, bass, measure 41), and before the complete entry of the subject in the tenor (measure 44). The same pattern occurs before (measure 69) and after (measure 74), with the final entry of the bass (measure 70). This technique of false entries is new and had not yet appeared in the collection.

Just like the fugue in A minor, this one again presents the challenge of problematic fingerings and voice crossings within the collection.

== Origin, genesis, and relationships ==
Although the two pieces may have originally been composed in other keys than B minor, it is almost certain that the composition dates to around 1722 – the same year that saw the creation of the B minor fugue BWV 951, based on a subject taken from the Trio Sonata Op. 1 by Tomaso Albinoni, which shares some similarities with the B minor fugue.

The style of the prelude – with its walking bass, suspensions, and the Phrygian cadence of the first section – correlates with the trio sonatas of Corelli, especially the Preludio grave from Op. 4 No. 2 (1694), though treated with greater rigor than its model. It is likely that an earlier version ended at the sixteenth measure and that, in developing the work, Bach added a Phrygian cadence to the original one. In the second part, the texture suddenly becomes denser after the double bar.

In a manuscript copy by an anonymous student of Bach from 1722 to 1723 (manuscript p. 401, likely copied from P 415), the first fourteen measures of the B minor prelude BWV 923 appear. Bach may have been undecided about which to use, as the prelude BWV 993 is sometimes paired with the fugue BWV 951. Given the tightly organized nature of the preludes in Book I and Bach's intention to demonstrate compositional technique, it is unlikely that he intended to conclude the collection with such a loosely structured and impressive arpeggiated prelude.

A similarity can be noted between measures 24–25 of the prelude and the main developmental element of the fugue (fugue: measures 19–20).

== Legacy ==
Johann Philipp Kirnberger cited the fugue as an example in his treatise published in Berlin in 1773, Die wahren Grundsätze zum Gebrauche der Harmonie.

Emmanuel Alois Förster (1748–1823) created an arrangement of the fugue for string quartet, performed by the Emerson Quartet.

Around 1817, as a contrapuntal exercise in preparation for the late string quartets (in the handling of inner voices), the second movement of the Ninth Symphony, and the Hammerklavier Sonata, Beethoven created a partial transcription of the work for the string quartet. The score bears the catalog number Hess 35.

Théodore Dubois created a four-hand piano version, published in 1914.

In the 1920s, Leopold Stokowski arranged the prelude for orchestra and recorded it with the Philadelphia Orchestra in May 1929 (Victor 7316 B). (Note: Reissue: Naxos 8.111297.) The bass line is represented by pizzicatos in the lower strings.

Stravinsky sketched a transcription of the prelude for string quintet with two violas two years before his death, and in 2006, the Dutch composer Louis Andriessen completed it.{[efn|1=The work was recorded for the Attacca label (CD 29121) in 2007 by a Dutch ensemble, the Schoenberg Quartet, on a disc dedicated to the string quartet works of Louis Andriessen (OCLC 529874946).
