= Prelude and Fugue in D minor, BWV 875 =

Keyboard composition by Johann Sebastian Bach

The Prelude and Fugue in D minor, BWV 875 is a keyboard composition written by Johann Sebastian Bach. It is the sixth prelude and fugue in the second book of The Well-Tempered Clavier, a series of 48 preludes and fugues by the composer.

== Prelude ==
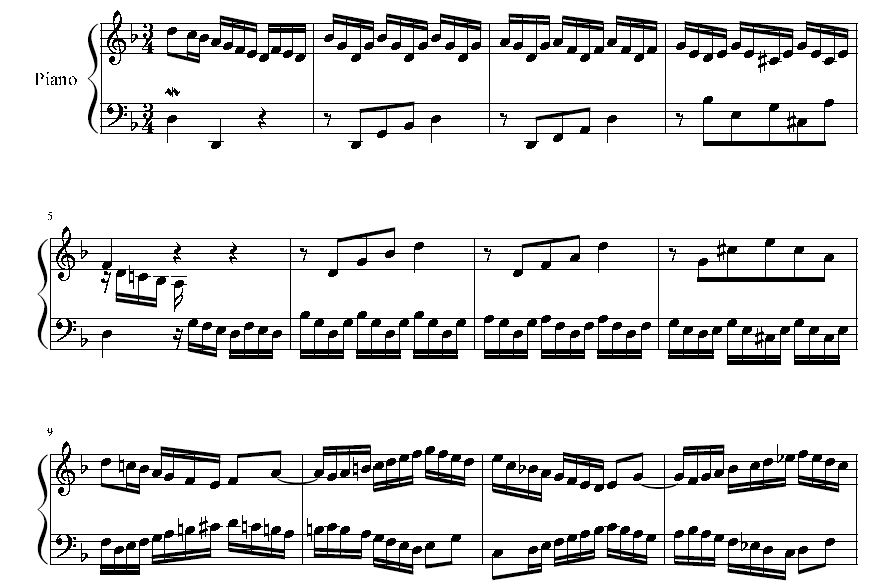
Beginning of Prelude

The prelude has 61 bars and is in 3/4. It is made up of running semiquavers and quavers. The piece was originally composed as a moto perpetuo, probably inspired by Antonio Vivaldi. The figuration is similar to that of a violin piece, particularly in an earlier revision of the prelude, Preambulum d-Moll, BWV 875a, which does not include the demisemiquavers in bars 22, 24, etc. in the final version. Despite this, the basic structure has remained the same: binary form, with the main theme restated in the dominant in bar 27.

== Fugue ==
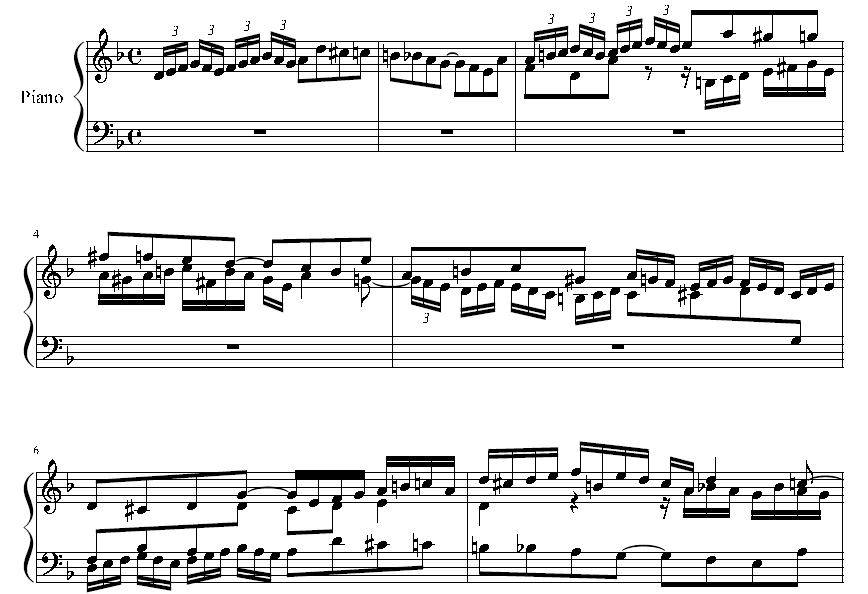
Beginning of Fugue

The fugue has 27 bars, is in common time and is in three voices. The subject's structure is similar to that of the theme of The Musical Offering, opening in triplet semiquavers moving diatonically then quavers moving chromatically. They are later accompanied by the ordinary semiquavers of the countersubject, which make the fugue constantly switch between duple and triple rhythms, even more often than the D major prelude.
