= Prelude and Fugue in E minor, BWV 879 =

Composition by Johann Sebastian Bach

Prelude and Fugue in E minor, BWV 879, is the tenth piece in the second book of The Well-Tempered Clavier by Johann Sebastian Bach, compiled between 1739 and 1744.

The prelude, written in the style of an invention, features a courante-like motion with interweaving patterns between the hands. The three-voice fugue contains an unusually long subject and varied rhythmic elements, and is structurally elaborate. Despite its apparent simplicity and lack of ornamentation, it is among the less frequently regarded fugues in the collection.

== Prelude ==
The prelude, written in 3/8 and comprising 108 measures, is structured in two repeated sections (AA–BB), consisting of 48 and 60 measures respectively, with a volta marking—a unique feature within The Well-Tempered Clavier.

It closely resembles the two-voice inventions, with the theme alternating between hands in echo-like exchanges, including trills and swirling figures, and is structurally similar to the Prelude and Fugue in D-sharp minor, BWV 877. The style is reminiscent of a courante. The first section ends on the dominant, while the second resumes the theme in contrary motion.

The theme is developed throughout the piece through transposition, inversion, and canonic treatment (measures 24–28). Ornamented thirty-second notes appear in later copies, notably in measures 3, 4, 12, and 22.

== Fugue ==
The fugue, in three voices, written in, contains 86 measures.

The subject is unusually long, spanning six measures—the longest in either volume of The Well-Tempered Clavier. It is characterized by an energetic style, with dotted rhythms appearing in the autograph score. The subject incorporates a wide range of rhythmic values, including triplets, sixteenth notes, dotted eighth–sixteenth patterns, quarter notes, and tied quarters, though the dotted figures are generally interpreted as triplets, as in the Prelude in D major. Despite its rhythmic complexity and the difficulty of identifying its thematic identity, the fugue maintains a straightforward contrapuntal style and a simple formal structure.

Due to the length of the subject, the exposition extends over 19 measures. The autograph manuscript originally ends at measure 60, on the dominant, marked with a fermata. The fugue ultimately concludes with a final statement of the subject, followed by a cadence, a ritardando, and another fermata. This is succeeded by four additional measures, ending on a final fermata with a sounded major third. At measure 81, the descending motion recalls the pedal point found after the organ prelude BWV 543.

The countersubject is similarly intricate but features two contrasting sections that render it more distinguishable:

== Relationship ==
Despite their structural and stylistic differences, the prelude and fugue are related.

== Manuscripts ==
The manuscripts considered most important are in the hand of Bach himself or Anna Magdalena:

- Source “A”, British Library, London (Add. MS. 35 021), compiled between 1739 and 1742. It contains 21 pairs of preludes and fugues: C minor, D major, and F minor (numbers 4, 5, and 12) are missing, presumed lost.
- Source “B”, Berlin State Library (P 430), a copy dated 1744, by Johann Christoph Altnikol.

== Legacy ==
Théodore Dubois created a version for piano four hands, published in 1914.
