= The Well-Tempered Clavier =

Collection of keyboard music by J.S. Bach

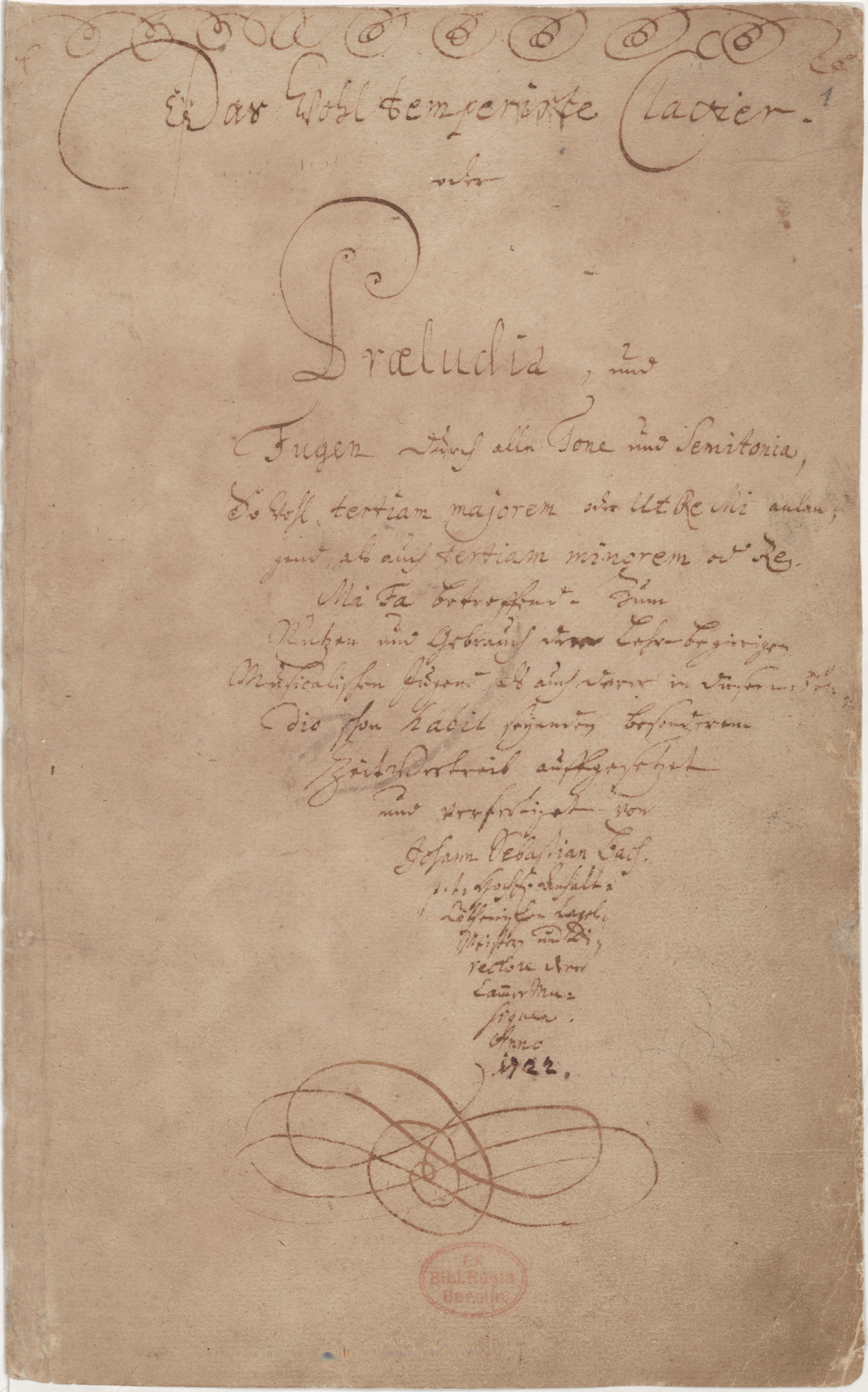
Title page of Das Wohltemperirte Clavier, Book 1 (autograph)

The Well-Tempered Clavier, BWV 846–893, consists of two sets of preludes and fugues in all 24 major and minor keys for keyboard by Johann Sebastian Bach. In the composer's time clavier referred to a variety of keyboard instruments, namely the harpsichord, the clavichord and the organ (which operates using air instead of strings), but not excluding the regal and the then newly-invented fortepiano.

The modern German spelling for the collection is Das wohltemperierte Klavier (WTK; German pronunciation: [das ˌvoːlˌtɛmpəˈʁiːɐ̯tə klaˈviːɐ̯]). Bach gave the title Das Wohltemperirte Clavier to a book of preludes and fugues in all 24 keys, major and minor, dated 1722, composed "for the profit and use of musical youth desirous of learning, and especially for the pastime of those already skilled in this study". 20 years later, Bach compiled a second book of the same kind (24 pairs of preludes and fugues), which became known as The Well-Tempered Clavier, Part Two (in German: Zweyter Theil, modern spelling: Zweiter Teil).

Modern editions usually refer to both parts as The Well-Tempered Clavier, Book 1 (WTC 1) and The Well-Tempered Clavier, Book 2 (WTC 2), respectively. The collection is generally regarded as one of the most important works in the history of classical music.

== Composition history ==
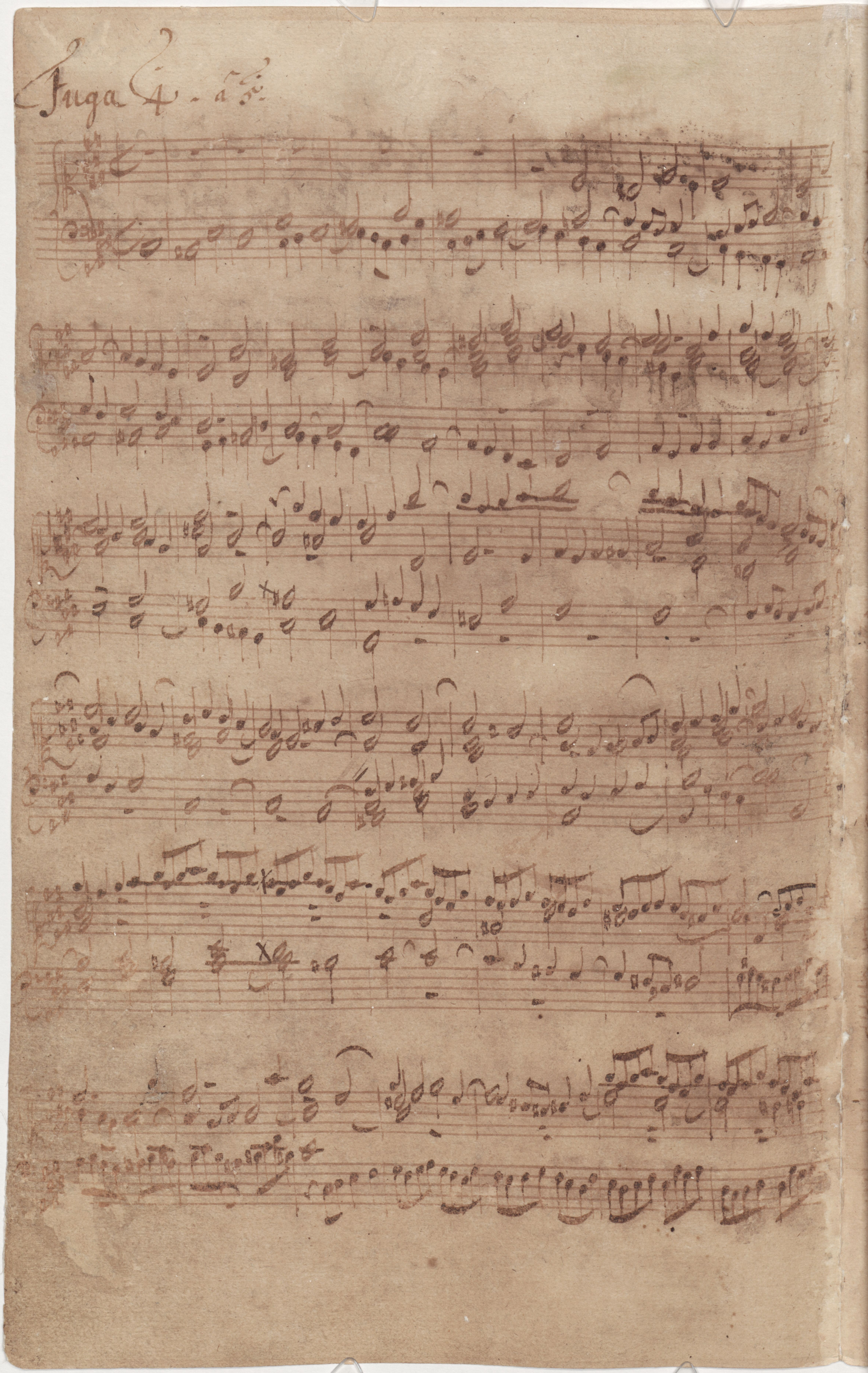
Bach's autograph of the 4th Fugue of Book 1

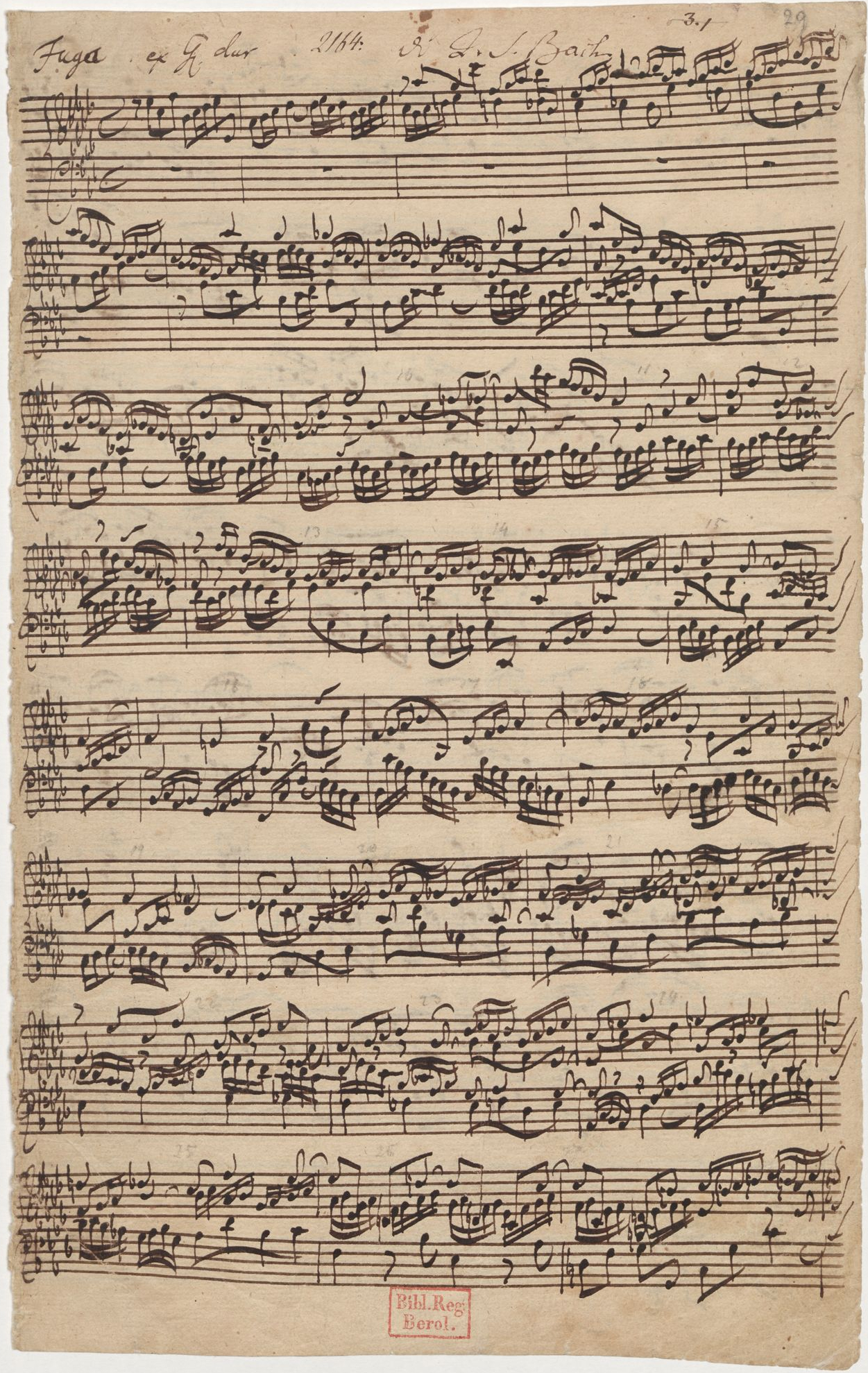
Bach's autograph of Fugue No. 17 in A♭ major from the second part of Das Wohltemperirte Clavier

Each set contains 24 pairs of prelude and fugue. The first pair is in C major, the second in C minor, the third in C♯ major, the fourth in C♯ minor, and so on. The rising chromatic pattern continues until every key has been represented, finishing with a B minor fugue. The first set was compiled in 1722 during Bach's appointment in Köthen, and the second followed 20 years later in 1742 while he was in Leipzig.

Bach recycled some of the preludes and fugues from earlier sources: the 1720 Klavierbüchlein für Wilhelm Friedemann Bach, for instance, contains versions of eleven of the preludes of the first book of the Well-Tempered Clavier.

In Bach's own time just one similar collection was published, by Johann Christian Schickhardt (1681–1762), whose Op. 30 L'alphabet de la musique (circa 1735) contained 24 sonatas in all keys for flute or violin and basso continuo, and included a transposition scheme for alto recorder.

=== Precursors ===
Although the Well-Tempered Clavier was the first collection of fully worked keyboard pieces in all 24 keys, similar ideas had occurred earlier. Before the advent of modern tonality in the late 17th century, numerous composers produced collections of pieces in all eight modes: Johann Pachelbel's Magnificat fugues (composed 1695–1706), Georg Muffat's Apparatus Musico-organisticus of 1690 and Johann Speth's Ars magna of 1693 for example. Furthermore, some two hundred years before Bach's time, equal temperament was realized on plucked string instruments, such as the lute and the theorbo, resulting in several collections of pieces in all keys (although the music was not yet tonal in the modern sense of the word):

- a cycle of 24 passamezzo–saltarello pairs (1567) by Giacomo Gorzanis (c. 1520~1577)
- 24 groups of dances, "clearly related to 12 major and 12 minor keys" (1584) by Vincenzo Galilei (c. 1528–1591)
- 30 preludes for 12 course lute or theorbo by John Wilson (1595–1674)

One of the earliest keyboard composers to realize a collection of organ pieces in successive keys was Daniel Croner (1656–1740), who compiled one such cycle of preludes in 1682. His contemporary Johann Heinrich Kittel (1652–1682) also composed a cycle of 12 organ preludes in successive keys.

J. C. F. Fischer's Ariadne musica neo-organoedum (published in 1702 and reissued 1715) is a set of 20 prelude and fugue pairs in ten major and nine minor keys, and the Phrygian mode, plus five chorale-based ricercars. Bach knew the collection and borrowed some of the themes from Fischer for the Well-Tempered Clavier. Other contemporary works include the treatise Exemplarische Organisten-Probe (1719) by Johann Mattheson (1681–1764), which included 48 figured bass exercises in all keys, Partien auf das Clavier (1718) by Christoph Graupner (1683–1760) with eight suites in successive keys, and Friedrich Suppig's Fantasia from Labyrinthus Musicus (1722), a long and formulaic sectional composition ranging through all 24 keys which was intended for an enharmonic keyboard with both 31 notes per octave and pure major thirds. Finally, a lost collection by Johann Pachelbel (1653–1706), Fugen und Praeambuln über die gewöhnlichsten Tonos figuratos (announced 1704), may have included prelude-fugue pairs in all keys or modes.

It was long believed that Bach had taken the title The Well-Tempered Clavier from a similarly named set of 24 Preludes and Fugues in all the keys, for which a manuscript dated 1689 was found in the library of the Brussels Conservatoire. It was later shown that this was the work of a composer who was not even born in 1689: Bernhard Christian Weber (1 December 1712 – 5 February 1758). In fact, it was written in 1745–1750 in imitation of Bach's earlier example.

=== Intended tuning ===
Bach's title suggests that he had written for a 12 note tuning system, in which all keys sounded in tune (called a "circulating temperament" or a "well temperament"). One of the opposing systems in Bach's day was meantone temperament in which keys with many accidentals sound out of tune on keyboards limited to 12 pitches per octave. Bach would have been familiar with different tuning systems, and in particular as an organist would have played instruments tuned to a meantone system.

During much of the 20th century it was presumed, possibly mistakenly, that Bach intended equal temperament, which after Bach's death became popular as the standard keyboard tuning, and had been described by theorists and musicians for at least a century before Bach's birth. Accounts of Bach's own tuning practice are few and inexact. The three most cited sources are Forkel, Bach's first biographer; Friedrich Wilhelm Marpurg, who received information from Bach's sons and pupils; and Johann Kirnberger, one of those pupils. Despite the presumption of equal temperament, research has continued into various unequal systems contemporary with Bach's career; there is debate whether Bach might have meant a range of similar temperaments, perhaps altered slightly in practice from piece to piece, or possibly some single, specific, "well-tempered" solution for all purposes. Modern scholars suggest some form of unequal well temperament instead of equal temperament.

Forkel reports that Bach tuned his own harpsichords and clavichords and found other people's tunings unsatisfactory, and also that Bach's personal tuning system allowed him to play in all keys, and to modulate into distant keys almost without the listeners noticing. In the course of a heated debate, Marpurg and Kirnberger appear to agree that Bach required all the major thirds to be sharper than pure – which is not very informative, since it is essentially a prerequisite for any temperament to sound tolerable in all keys.

Johann Georg Neidhardt, writing in 1724–1732, described a range of unequal and near-equal temperaments (as well as equal temperament itself), which can be successfully used to perform some of Bach's music, and were later praised by some of Bach's pupils and associates. J.S. Bach's son Carl Philipp Emanuel Bach himself published a rather vague tuning method which was close to, but still not equal temperament: He wrote that it had only "most of" the fifths tempered, without saying which ones nor by how much.

Since 1950 there have been many other proposals and many performances of the work in different and unequal tunings, some derived from historical sources, some by modern authors. Whatever their provenances, these schemes all promote the existence of subtly different musical characters in different keys, due to the sizes of their intervals. However, they disagree as to which key receives which character:

- Herbert Anton Kellner argued from the mid-1970s until his death that esoteric considerations such as the pattern of Bach's signet ring, numerology, and more could be used to determine the correct temperament. His result is somewhat similar to Werckmeister's most familiar "correct" temperament. Kellner's temperament was widely adopted worldwide for the tuning pipe organs, and contains seven pure fifths and five 1 /5 comma fifths. It is especially effective as a moderate solution to play 17th century music, if one avoids music that requires more than two flats.
- John Barnes analyzed the Well-Tempered Clavier's major-key preludes statistically, observing that some major thirds are used more often than others. His results were broadly in agreement with Kellner's and Werckmeister's patterns. His own proposed temperament from that study is a 1 /6 comma variant of both Kellner ( 1 /5) and Werckmeister ( 1 /4), with the same general pattern tempering the naturals, and concluding with a tempered fifth B–F♯.
- Mark Lindley, a researcher of historical temperaments, has written several surveys of temperament styles in the German Baroque tradition. In his publications he has recommended and devised many patterns close to those of Neidhardt, with subtler gradations of interval size. Since a 1985 article in which he addressed some issues in the Well-Tempered Clavier, Lindley's theories have focused more on Bach's organ music than the harpsichord or clavichord works.

==== Title page tuning interpretations ====
Top of Bach's title page for the 1st book of The Well-Tempered Clavier (1722) showing handwritten loops which some have interpreted as tuning instructions.

More recently there has been a series of proposals of temperaments derived from the handwritten doodle of loops on the title page of Bach's personal 1722 manuscript.

- In the course of studying German Baroque organ tunings, Andreas Sparschuh in 1999 assigned mathematical and acoustic meaning to the loops. Each loop, he argued, represents a fifth in the sequence for tuning the keyboard, starting from A. From this Sparschuh devised a recursive tuning algorithm, resembling the Collatz conjecture in mathematics: It subtracts one beat per second each time Bach's diagram has a non-empty loop. In 2006 he retracted his 1998 proposal based on A = 420 Hz, and replaced it with another at A = 410 Hz.
- Michael Zapf in 2001 reinterpreted the loops as indicating the rate of beating of different fifths in a given range of the keyboard in terms of seconds-per-beat, with the tuning now starting on C.
- J. C. Francis (2004) reported a mathematical analysis of the loops using Mathematica under the assumption they represented beats per second. In 2004, he also distributed several temperaments derived from BWV 924.
- B. Lehman (2004, 2005) proposed a 1 /6 and 1/ 12 comma layout derived from Bach's loops, which he published in 2005 in articles of three music journals. Reaction to this work has been both vigorous and mixed, with other writers producing further speculative schemes or variants.
- D. Jencka (2005) proposed a variation of Lehman's layout where one of the 1 /6 commas is spread over three fifths (G♯–D♯–A♯=B♭), resulting in a 1/ 18 comma division. Motivations for Jencka's approach involve an analysis of the possible logic behind the figures themselves, and his belief that a wide fifth (B♭–F) found in Lehman's interpretation is unlikely in a well-temperament from the time.
- Interbartolo, Venturino, & Bof (2006) proposed a tuning system deduced from the W.T.C. title page. Their work was published the next year in a book by the same title.

Nevertheless, some musicologists say there is insufficient proof that Bach's looped drawing signifies anything reliable about a tuning method. Bach may have tuned differently per occasion, or per composition, throughout his career.

- D. Schulenberg (2006) allows that Lehman's argument is "ingenious" but counters that it "lacks documentary support (if the swirls were so important, why did Bach's students not copy them accurately, if at all?)" and concludes that the swirls cannot "be unambiguously interpreted as a code for a particular temperament".
- L. Swich (2011) more recently presented an alternative reading from that of Lehman, and others, of Bach's tuning method as derived from the title page calligraphic drawing: It differs in significant details, resulting in a circulating but unequal temperament using 1 /5 Pythagorean-comma fifths that is effective through all 24 keys and, most important, tunable by ear without an electronic tuning device.

Swich's proposal is based on the equal timing of the beats between the fifth F–C and the third F–A (c. 3 beats per second) and between the fifth C–G and the third C–E (c. 2 beats per second). Such a system is reminiscent of Kellner's 1977 temperament and even more closely to the temperament used for the Organ of St. Ludgeri in Norden, built in 1688 by Arp Schnitger, and the temperament later described by Carlo Gervasoni (1800).

A system like Swich's, with all its major thirds more or less sharp, is confirmed by Friedrich Wilhelm Marpurg's description of the way Bach's famous student J.P. Kirnberger was taught to tune in his lessons with Bach: Kirnberger's tuning allows all 24 keys to be played through without changing tuning nor unpleasant intervals, but with varying degrees of difference. The temperament is unequal, and the keys do not all sound the same. Compared to Werckmeister III, the other 24 key-circulating temperaments, Kirnberger's version of Bach's tuning is much more differentiated, with its 8 different kinds of major thirds (instead of Werckmeister's 4).

The manuscript Bach P415 in the Berlin State Library is the only known copy of the W.T.C. that shows the doodle. It would be a bit too cryptic for Bach's spirit, but seems to the hopeful to represent the purpose for which the masterpiece was written, and at the same time, a clue to its decipherment. In perspective, this is not surprising, since the document with the doodle is most probably the working copy Johann Sebastian Bach used in classes with his students.

== Content ==
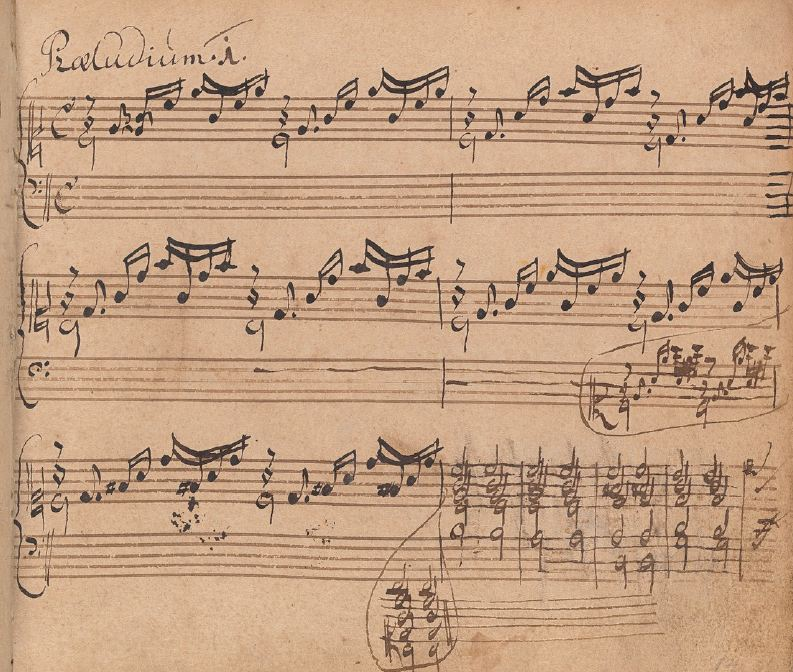
Early version BWV 846a (1720) of the first prelude of the first book, as written down by Bach in his eldest son's notebook

Each Prelude is followed by a Fugue in the same key. In each book the first Prelude and Fugue is in C major, followed by a Prelude and Fugue in its parallel minor key (C minor). Then all keys, each major key followed by its parallel minor key, are followed through, each time moving up a half tone: C → C♯ → D → E♭ → E → F → F♯ → ... ending with ... → B♭ → B.

=== Book 1 ===
The first book of the Well-Tempered Clavier was composed in the early 1720s, with Bach's autograph dated 1722. Apart from the early versions of several preludes included in W. F. Bach's Klavierbüchlein (1720) there is an almost complete collection of "Prelude and Fughetta" versions predating the 1722 autograph, known from a later copy by an unidentified scribe.

==== Title page ====
The title page of the first book of the Well-Tempered Clavier reads:

Das Wohltemperirte Clavier oder Præludia, und Fugen durch alle Tone und Semitonia, so wohl tertiam majorem oder Ut Re Mi anlangend, als auch tertiam minorem oder Re Mi Fa betreffend. Zum Nutzen und Gebrauch der Lehrbegierigen Musicalischen Jugend, als auch derer in diesem studio schon habil seyenden besonderem Zeitvertreib auffgesetzet und verfertiget von Johann Sebastian Bach. p. t: Hochfürstlich Anhalt-Cöthenischen Capel-Meistern und Directore derer Camer Musiquen. Anno 1722.	The well-tempered Clavier, or Preludes and Fugues through all the tones and semitones, both as regards the tertiam majorem or Ut Re Mi [i.e., major] and tertiam minorem or Re Mi Fa [i.e., minor]. For the profit and use of the studious musical young, and also for the special diversion of those who are already skilful in this study, composed and made by Johann Sebastian Bach, for the time being Capellmeister and Director of the Chamber-music of the Prince of Anhalt-Cothen. In the year 1722.

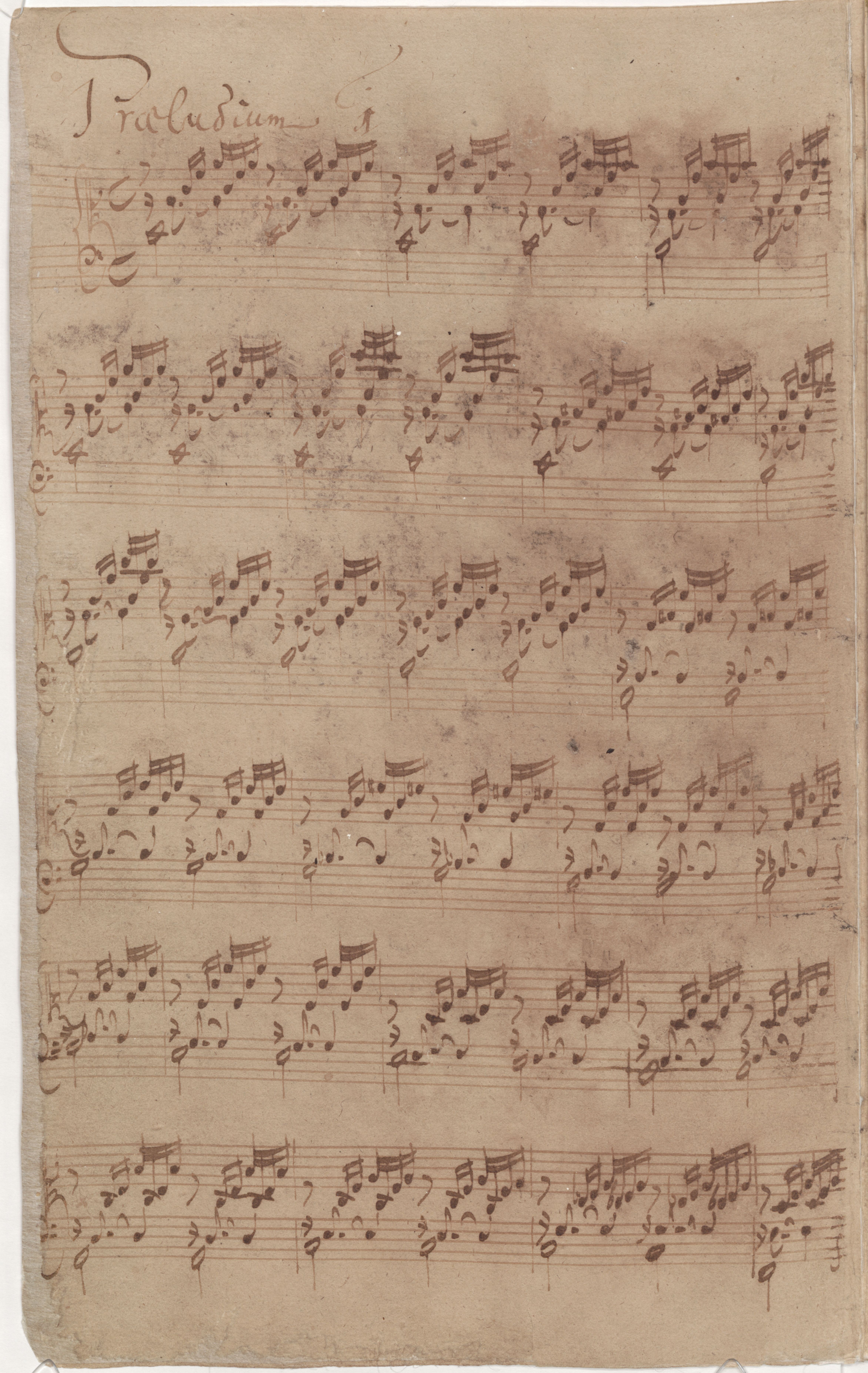
Bach's autograph (1722) of the first prelude of Book 1

==== No. 1: Prelude and Fugue in C major, BWV 846 ====
An early version of this prelude, BWV 846a, is found in Klavierbüchlein für Wilhelm Friedemann Bach (No. 14: "Praeludium 1"). The prelude is a seemingly simple progression of arpeggiated chords, one of the connotations of 'préluder' as the French lutenists used it.

==== No. 2: Prelude and Fugue in C minor, BWV 847 ====
Prelude and Fugue in C minor, BWV 847. Prelude also in WFB Klavierbüchlein, No. 15: Praeludium 2.

==== No. 3: Prelude and Fugue in C♯ major, BWV 848 ====
Prelude and Fugue in C♯ major, BWV 848. Prelude also in WFB Klavierbüchlein, No. 21: Praeludium [8].

==== No. 4: Prelude and Fugue in C♯ minor, BWV 849 ====
Prelude and Fugue in C♯ minor, BWV 849. Prelude also in WFB Klavierbüchlein, No. 22: Praeludium [9].

==== No. 5: Prelude and Fugue in D major, BWV 850 ====
Prelude and Fugue in D major, BWV 850. Prelude also in WFB Klavierbüchlein, No. 17: Praeludium 4.

==== No. 6: Prelude and Fugue in D minor, BWV 851 ====
Prelude and Fugue in D minor, BWV 851. Prelude also in WFB Klavierbüchlein, No. 16: Praeludium 3.

==== No. 7: Prelude and Fugue in E♭ major, BWV 852 ====
Prelude and Fugue in E♭ major, BWV 852.

==== No. 8: Prelude in E♭ minor and Fugue in D♯ minor, BWV 853 ====
Prelude and Fugue in E♭ minor, BWV 853. Prelude also in WFB Klavierbüchlein, No. 23: Praeludium [10]. The fugue was transposed from D minor to D♯ minor.

==== No. 9: Prelude and Fugue in E major, BWV 854 ====
Prelude and Fugue in E major, BWV 854. Prelude also in WFB Klavierbüchlein, No. 19: Praeludium 6.

==== No. 10: Prelude and Fugue in E minor, BWV 855 ====
Prelude and Fugue in E minor, BWV 855. Early version BWV 855a of the Prelude in Klavierbüchlein für Wilhelm Friedemann Bach (No. 18: "Praeludium 5").

==== No. 11: Prelude and Fugue in F major, BWV 856 ====
Prelude and Fugue in F major, BWV 856. Prelude also in WFB Klavierbüchlein, No. 20: Praeludium 7.

==== No. 12: Prelude and Fugue in F minor, BWV 857 ====
Prelude and Fugue in F minor, BWV 857. Prelude also in WFB Klavierbüchlein, No. 24: Praeludium [11].

==== No. 13: Prelude and Fugue in F♯ major, BWV 858 ====
Prelude and Fugue in F♯ major, BWV 858.

==== No. 14: Prelude and Fugue in F♯ minor, BWV 859 ====
Prelude and Fugue in F♯ minor, BWV 859.

==== No. 15: Prelude and Fugue in G major, BWV 860 ====
Prelude and Fugue in G major, BWV 860.

==== No. 16: Prelude and Fugue in G minor, BWV 861 ====
Prelude and Fugue in G minor, BWV 861.

==== No. 17: Prelude and Fugue in A♭ major, BWV 862 ====
Prelude and Fugue in A♭ major, BWV 862.

==== No. 18: Prelude and Fugue in G♯ minor, BWV 863 ====
Prelude and Fugue in G♯ minor, BWV 863.

==== No. 19: Prelude and Fugue in A major, BWV 864 ====
Prelude and Fugue in A major, BWV 864.

==== No. 20: Prelude and Fugue in A minor, BWV 865 ====
Prelude and Fugue in A minor, BWV 865.

==== No. 21: Prelude and Fugue in B♭ major, BWV 866 ====
Prelude and Fugue in B♭ major, BWV 866.

==== No. 22: Prelude and Fugue in B♭ minor, BWV 867 ====
Prelude and Fugue in B♭ minor, BWV 867.

==== No. 23: Prelude and Fugue in B major, BWV 868 ====
Prelude and Fugue in B major, BWV 868.

==== No. 24: Prelude and Fugue in B minor, BWV 869 ====
Prelude and Fugue in B minor, BWV 869.

=== Book 2 ===
The two major primary sources for this collection of Preludes and Fugues are the "London Original" (LO) manuscript, dated between 1739 and 1742, with scribes including Bach, his wife Anna Magdalena and his oldest son Wilhelm Friedeman, which is the basis for Version A of WTC 2, and for Version B, that is the version published by the 19th-century Bach-Gesellschaft, a 1744 copy primarily written by Johann Christoph Altnickol (Bach's son-in-law), with some corrections by Bach, and later also by Altnickol and others.

==== No. 1: Prelude and Fugue in C major, BWV 870 ====
Prelude and Fugue in C major, BWV 870.

==== No. 2: Prelude and Fugue in C minor, BWV 871 ====
Prelude and Fugue in C minor, BWV 871.

==== No. 3: Prelude and Fugue in C♯ major, BWV 872 ====
Prelude and Fugue C♯ major, played by Raymond Smullyan

Prelude and Fugue in C♯ major, BWV 872.

==== No. 4: Prelude and Fugue in C♯ minor, BWV 873 ====
Prelude and Fugue in C♯ minor, BWV 873.

==== No. 5: Prelude and Fugue in D major, BWV 874 ====
Prelude and Fugue in D major, BWV 874.

==== No. 6: Prelude and Fugue in D minor, BWV 875 ====
Prelude and Fugue in D minor, BWV 875.

==== No. 7: Prelude and Fugue in E♭ major, BWV 876 ====
Prelude and Fugue in E♭ major, BWV 876.

==== No. 8: Prelude and Fugue in D♯ minor, BWV 877 ====
Prelude and Fugue in D♯ minor, BWV 877.

==== No. 9: Prelude and Fugue in E major, BWV 878 ====
Prelude and Fugue E major, played by Randolph Hokanson

Prelude and Fugue in E major, BWV 878.

==== No. 10: Prelude and Fugue in E minor, BWV 879 ====
Prelude and Fugue in E minor, BWV 879.

==== No. 11: Prelude and Fugue in F major, BWV 880 ====
Prelude and Fugue in F major, BWV 880.

==== No. 12: Prelude and Fugue in F minor, BWV 881 ====
Prelude and Fugue in F minor, BWV 881. Prelude as a theme with variations. Fugue in three voices.

==== No. 13: Prelude and Fugue in F♯ major, BWV 882 ====
Prelude and Fugue in F♯ major, BWV 882.

==== No. 14: Prelude and Fugue in F♯ minor, BWV 883 ====
Prelude and Fugue in F♯ minor, BWV 883.

==== No. 15: Prelude and Fugue in G major, BWV 884 ====
Prelude and Fugue in G major, BWV 884.

==== No. 16: Prelude and Fugue in G minor, BWV 885 ====
Prelude and Fugue in G minor, BWV 885.

==== No. 17: Prelude and Fugue in A♭ major, BWV 886 ====
Prelude and Fugue in A♭ major, BWV 886.

==== No. 18: Prelude and Fugue in G♯ minor, BWV 887 ====
Prelude and Fugue G♯ minor, played by O. Yevsyukova

Prelude and Fugue in G♯ minor, BWV 887.

==== No. 19: Prelude and Fugue in A major, BWV 888 ====
Prelude and Fugue in A major, BWV 888.

==== No. 20: Prelude and Fugue in A minor, BWV 889 ====
Prelude and Fugue in A minor, BWV 889.

==== No. 21: Prelude and Fugue in B♭ major, BWV 890 ====
Prelude and Fugue in B♭ major, BWV 890.

==== No. 22: Prelude and Fugue in B♭ minor, BWV 891 ====
Prelude and Fugue B♭ minor, played by M. Pan'kiv

Prelude and Fugue in B♭ minor, BWV 891.

==== No. 23: Prelude and Fugue in B major, BWV 892 ====
Prelude and Fugue in B major, BWV 892.

==== No. 24: Prelude and Fugue in B minor, BWV 893 ====
Prelude and Fugue B minor, played by V. Dacenko

Prelude and Fugue in B minor, BWV 893.

== Style ==
Musically, the structural regularities of the Well-Tempered Clavier encompass a wide range of styles. The preludes are formally free, although many of them exhibit typical Baroque melodic forms, often coupled to an extended free coda (e.g. Book 1 preludes in C minor, D major, and B♭ major). The preludes are also notable for their odd or irregular numbers of measures, in terms of both the phrases and the total number of measures in a given prelude.

Each fugue is marked with the number of voices, from two to five. Most are three- and four-voiced fugues, but two are five-voiced (the fugues in C♯ minor and B♭ minor from Book 1) and one is two-voiced (the fugue in E minor from Book 1). The fugues employ a full range of contrapuntal devices (fugal exposition, thematic inversion, stretto, etc.), but are generally more compact than Bach's fugues for organ.

Several attempts have been made to analyse the motivic connections between each prelude and fugue – most notably Wilhelm Werker and Johann Nepomuk David. The most direct motivic reference appears in the B major set from Book 1, in which the fugue subject uses the first four notes of the prelude, in the same metric position but at half speed.

== Reception ==
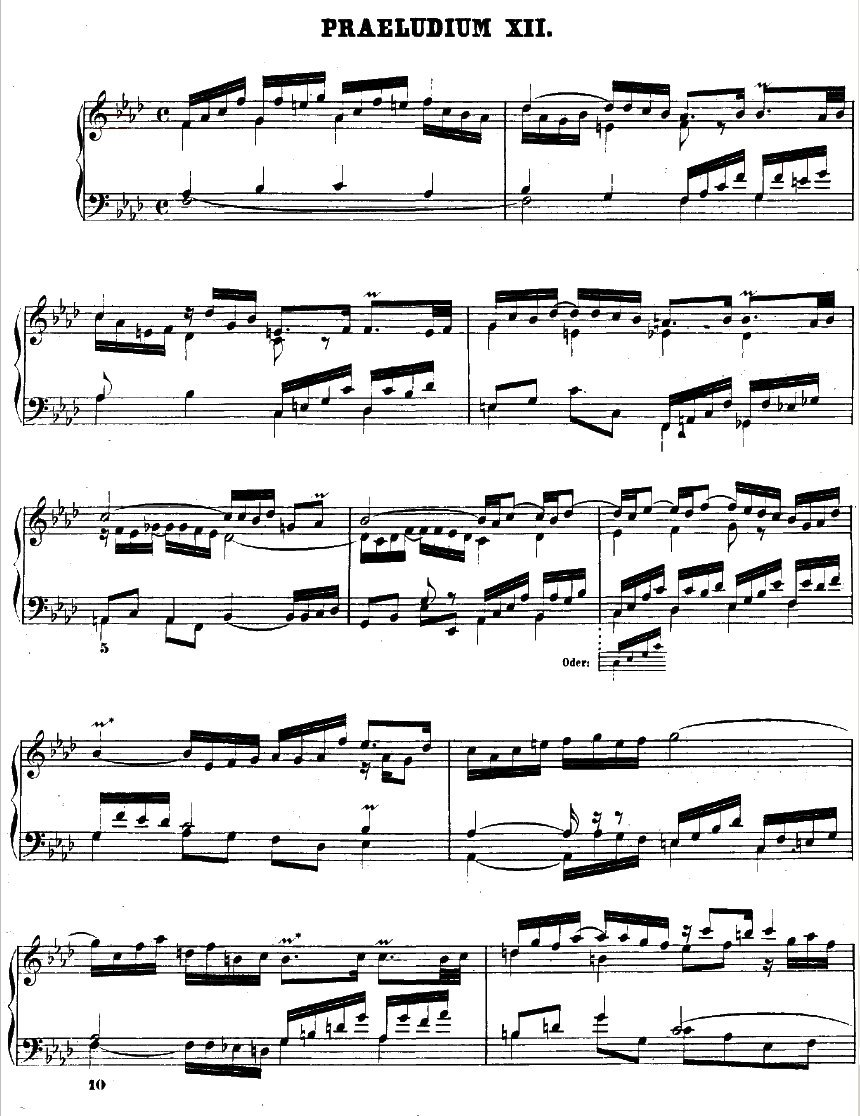
Bach Gesellschaft Ausgabe Vol. 14 (1866), p. 44: Book 1, Prelude No. 12

Both books of the Well-Tempered Clavier were widely circulated in manuscript, but printed copies were not made until 1801, 51 years after Bach's death, by three publishers almost simultaneously in Bonn, Leipzig and Zurich. Bach's style went out of favour in the time around his death, and most music in the early Classical period had neither contrapuntal complexity nor a great variety of keys. But, with the maturing of the Classical style in the 1770s, the Well-Tempered Clavier began to influence the course of musical history, with Haydn and Mozart studying the work closely.

Mozart transcribed some of the fugues of the Well-Tempered Clavier for string ensemble:

- BWV 853 → K. 404a/1
- BWV 871 → K. 405/1
- BWV 874 → K. 405/5
- BWV 876 → K. 405/2
- BWV 877 → K. 405/4
- BWV 878 → K. 405/3
- BWV 882 → K. 404a/3
- BWV 883 → K. 404a/2

Fantasy No. 1 with Fugue, K. 394 is one of Mozart's own compositions showing the influence the Well-Tempered Clavier had on him. Beethoven played the entire Well-Tempered Clavier by the time he was eleven, and produced an arrangement of BWV 867, for string quintet.

Hans von Bülow called The Well-Tempered Clavier the "Old Testament" of music (the Beethoven Sonatas were the "New Testament").

Bach's example inspired numerous composers of the 19th century; for instance, in 1835 Chopin started composing his 24 Preludes, Op. 28, inspired by the Well-Tempered Clavier. In the 20th century Dmitri Shostakovich wrote his 24 Preludes and Fugues, an even closer reference to Bach's model. Another inspiration after Bach, even before Shostakovich, was in 1940, when Vsevolod Zaderatsky created his main work, in the Gulag сamp conditions: a full cycle of 24 preludes and fugues (the work was unpublished during a long time and practically unknown until its premiere in 2014). Mario Castelnuovo-Tedesco wrote Les Guitares bien tempérées (The Well-Tempered Guitars), a set of 24 preludes and fugues for two guitars, in all 24 major and minor keys, inspired in both title and structure by Bach's work.

=== First prelude of Book 1 ===
The best-known piece from either book is the first prelude of Book 1. Anna Magdalena Bach copied a short version of this prelude in her 1725 Notebook (No. 29). The accessibility of this prelude, the "easy" key of C major, and its use of arpeggiated chords, have made it one of the most commonly studied pieces for piano students. This prelude also served as the basis for the Ave Maria of Charles Gounod.

=== Tenth prelude of Book 1 ===
Alexander Siloti transcribed a piano arrangement of the early version of Prelude and Fugue in E minor (BWV 855a), transposed into a Prelude in B minor.

== Recordings ==
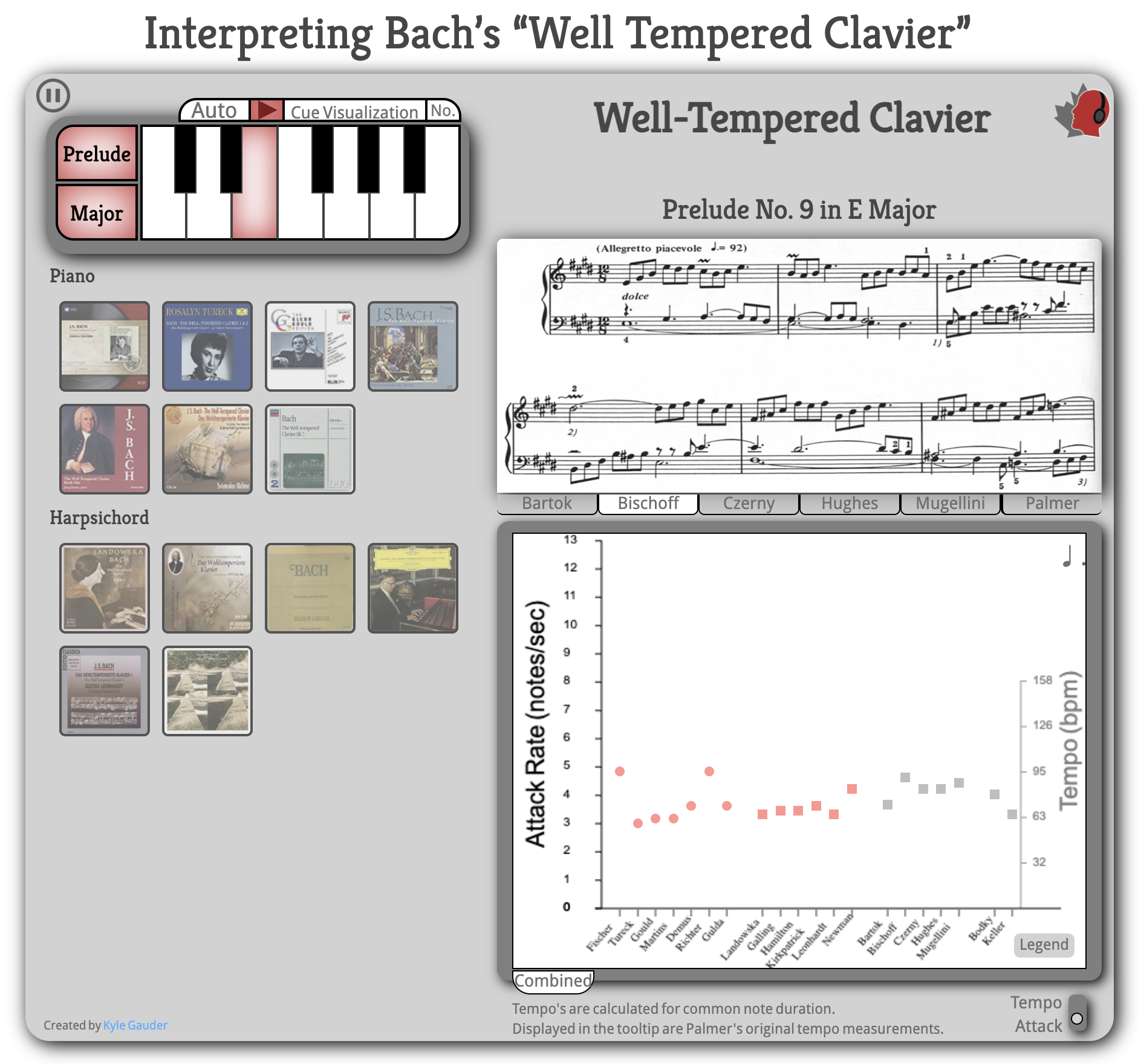
Interpretations of Bach's Well-Tempered Clavier (Prelude No. 9 in E Major)

The first complete recording of the Well-Tempered Clavier was made on the piano by Edwin Fischer for EMI between 1933 and 1936. The second was made by Wanda Landowska on harpsichord for RCA Victor in 1949 (Book 1) and 1952 (Book 2). Helmut Walcha, better known as an organist, recorded both books between 1959 and 1961 on a harpsichord. Daniel Chorzempa made the first recording using multiple instruments (harpsichord, clavichord, organ, and fortepiano) for Philips in 1982. As of 2013, over 150 recordings have been documented. In 2024, pianist Natalya Pasichnyk recorded Rethinking the Well-Tempered Clavier, a reimagination of Book I, which won the Golden Medal in the Global Music Awards that same year. The Glenn Gould recording of BWV 870 was included on the Voyager Golden Record.

Visit https://maplelab.net/bach/ to listen and visualize performances of Book 1 by Fisher, Landowska, Walcha, and 10 other renowned pianists. This tool also provides the score and tempo information of each recording, along with short performer biographies.

=== Audio of Book 1 ===
Harpsichord performances of various parts of Book 1 by Martha Goldstein are freely licensed. Such harpsichord performances may, for instance, be tuned in equal temperament, or in Werckmeister temperament. In addition to Martha Goldstein, Raymond Smullyan is another artist for whom several performances from Book 1 are freely licensed.

In March 2015, the pianist Kimiko Douglass-Ishizaka released a new and complete recording of Book 1 under a free license. Her performances are available below, beginning with the Prelude No. 1 in C major (BWV 846):

Prelude No. 1 in C major

Fugue No. 1 in C major

Prelude No. 2 in C minor

Fugue No. 2 in C minor

Prelude No. 3 in C♯ major

Fugue No. 3 in C♯ major

Prelude No. 4 in C♯ minor

Fugue No. 4 in C♯ minor

Prelude No. 5 in D major

Fugue No. 5 in D major

Prelude No. 6 in D minor

Fugue No. 6 in D minor

Prelude No. 7 in E♭ major

Fugue No. 7 in E♭ major

Prelude No. 8 in E♭ minor

Fugue No. 8 in D♯ minor

Prelude No. 9 in E major

Fugue No. 9 in E major

Prelude No. 10 in E minor

Fugue No. 10 in E minor

Prelude No. 11 in F major

Fugue No. 11 in F major

Prelude No. 12 in F minor

Fugue No. 12 in F minor

Prelude No. 13 F♯ major

Fugue No. 13 in F♯ major

Prelude No. 14 in F♯ minor

Fugue No. 14 in F♯ minor

Prelude No. 15 in G major

Fugue No. 15 in G major

Prelude No. 16 in G minor

Fugue No. 16 in G minor

Prelude No. 17 in A♭ major

Fugue No. 17 in A♭ major

Prelude No. 18 in G♯ minor

Fugue No. 18 in G♯ minor

Prelude No. 19 in A major

Fugue No. 19 in A major

Prelude No. 20 in A minor

Fugue No. 20 in A minor

Prelude No. 21 in B♭ major

Fugue No. 21 in B♭ major

Prelude No. 22 in B♭ minor

Fugue No. 22 in B♭ minor

Prelude No. 23 in B major

Fugue No. 23 in B major

Prelude No. 24 in B minor

Fugue No. 24 in B minor

== See also ==
- Bach Temperament
- Prelude and Fugue in F-sharp minor, BWV 883
