= Prelude and Fugue in C-sharp major, BWV 848 =

Keyboard composition by Johann Sebastian Bach

Prelude and Fugue in C♯ major, BWV 848

The Prelude and Fugue in C♯ major, BWV 848, is a keyboard composition written by Johann Sebastian Bach. It is the third prelude and fugue in the first book of The Well-Tempered Clavier, a series of 48 preludes and fugues by the composer.

== Analysis ==
=== Prelude ===
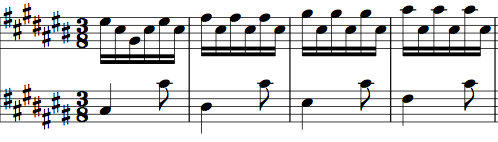
The first four bars of Bach's Prelude in C♯ major, BWV 848.

The prelude is a lively two-part texture, using a series of broken chords which swap between the hands. It is in a fast 3/8 time signature and is made up largely of semiquavers. Later on in the piece, the semiquaver line splits between the hands before ending with a short coda in an improvisatory manner. A prelude is a short, introductory piece. It is reinterpreted in track 4 of Charles Mingus' 1972 album Let My Children Hear Music.

=== Fugue ===
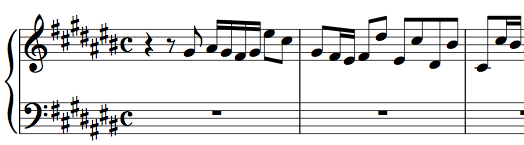
Fugue subject

The three-voice fugue is unusually devoid of the commonly used fugal devices, such as augmentation, diminution, inversion, pedal point or stretti. The cheerful subject is characterised by descending broken 6ths in light quavers. One of the countersubjects is constructed with running legato semiquavers, whilst the other consists of longer note values. The fugue has an extensive sequential episode which develops through related keys before the reappearance of the three voices.
