= Prelude and Fugue in C-sharp minor, BWV 849 =

Keyboard composition by Johann Sebastian Bach

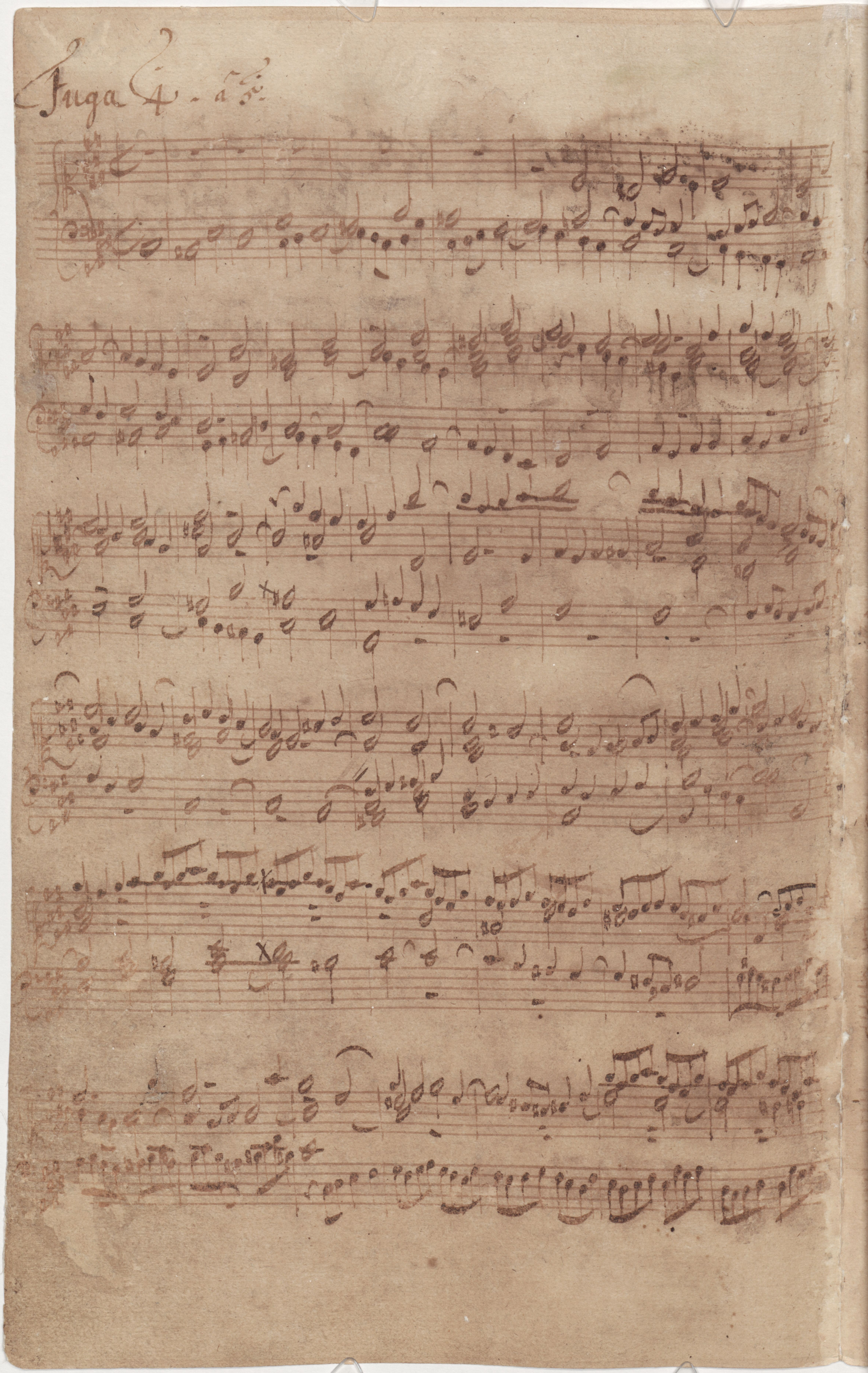
Fugue in C♯ minor of the Well-Tempered Clavier Book I in Bach's handwriting.

The Prelude and Fugue in C♯ minor, BWV 849, is a pair of keyboard compositions by Johann Sebastian Bach. It is the fourth prelude and fugue in the first book of The Well-Tempered Clavier, a series of 48 preludes and fugues by the composer.

== Prelude ==
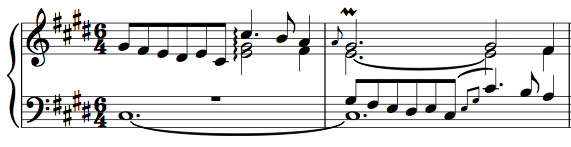
Prelude theme Prelude performed on the piano: by Martha Goldstein by Kimiko Ishizaka

The solemn and expressive, recitative character of the melody is reminiscent of Bach's passion music. A direct relationship between the prelude and its fugue, while not readily apparent, is hinted in the long-held durations of the bass in the first ten measures. If one omits the bass pitches of measures 4–7, what remains of measures 1–10 are the pitches C♯, B♯, E, D♯, C♯ of the fugue's subject. The prelude's most memorable motif is an ascending octave leap, which is heard throughout the piece.

== Fugue ==
Fugue theme Fugue performed on the piano: by Martha Goldstein by Kimiko Ishizaka

At 115 measures in length, and in five voices, this is one of Bach's longest and most densely-crafted fugues. While it contains three themes, it is not properly structured as a triple fugue because only the first idea receives exposition. The other two themes are more in the nature of countersubjects. The five voices are heard at the beginning of the fugue in ascending order, starting with the bass. The subject is heard in stretto in m. 55, and again densely so in mm. 94–99.

The subject (C♯, B♯, E, D♯ C♯) is a cross motif in half and whole notes. The contour of descending half step, ascending diminished fourth, and descending half step is the same as the Advent Chorale "Nun komm, der Heiden Heiland" (Kerman 2005, 28).

The second theme, which enters in measure 36, is a flowing changing-tone motif, in eighth notes, that can be heard as a diminution and motivic transformation of the main subject.

In measure 49, a third theme enters in concert with the prior two. These three are heard as invertible counterpoint in measures 49–88, at which point the second theme drops away. Thereafter, the first and third themes continue to the end, with a striking dissonance on the downbeat of measure 112, four bars before the end.

== Sources ==
Score editions

- Kroll, Franz, editor (1866). "Praeludium IV" and "Fuga IV", pp. 14–17 in Bach-Gesellschaft Ausgabe Volume 14: Clavierwerke Band 3. Leipzig: Breitkopf & Härtel
- Dürr, Alfred, editor (1989). New Bach Edition Series V: Keyboard and Lute Works Volume 6.1: Das Wohltemperierte Klavier I, Score and Critical Commentary Bärenreiter

Other

- Alfred Dürr (1998). Johann Sebastian Bach: Das Wohltemperierte Klavier. Bärenreiter Werkeinführungen. ISBN 9783761812297. (4th edition: 2012)
- Cecil Gray: The Forty-eight Preludes and Fugues of J.S. Bach. Oxford University Press, London, New York und Toronto 1938.
- Joseph Kerman: The Art of Fugue. Oakland: University of California Press 2005.
- Ernst Kurth: Grundlagen des linearen Kontrapunkts. Einführung in Stil und Technik von Bach’s melodischer Polyphonie. Bern, Drechsel 1917.
- Bach Digital Work 00992 and 00993 at www.bachdigital.de
