= Prelude and Fugue in B-flat minor, BWV 867 =

Keyboard composition by Johann Sebastian Bach

The Prelude and Fugue in B♭ minor, BWV 867, is a keyboard composition by Johann Sebastian Bach. It is the 22nd prelude and fugue in the first book of The Well-Tempered Clavier, a series of 48 preludes and fugues by the composer. It was composed in 1722 or earlier.

== Prelude ==
Prelude

Fugue
Performed by Kimiko Ishizaka

The prelude is in the style of an arioso, with up to seven nominal voices manifesting in only three distinct strands. The prelude's structure is bipartite, divided in half by a cadence. British music critic John Alexander Fuller Maitland compared it with the St Matthew Passion.

Below are the opening bars of the prelude:

== Fugue ==
Among the fugues in The Well-Tempered Clavier's first book, BWV 867's fugue is the closest to stile antico. The fugue is in five voices, and its subject stands out for its use of a wide minor ninth interval and "rhetorical" pause. Instead of substantial episodes, there are only two canonic bridges. The fugue climaxes in a five-part stretto before ending on a Picardy third.

Below are the first two statements of the subject in the fugue's opening:
