= Werckmeister temperament =

Tuning system described by Andreas Werckmeister

Werckmeister temperaments are the tuning systems described by Andreas Werckmeister in his writings. The tuning systems are numbered in two different ways: The first refers to the order in which they were presented as "good temperaments" in Werckmeister's 1691 treatise, the second to their labelling on his monochord. The monochord labels start from III since just intonation is labelled I and quarter-comma meantone is labelled II. The temperament commonly known as "Werckmeister III" is referred to in this article as "Werckmeister I (III)".

The tunings I (III), II (IV) and III (V) were presented graphically by a cycle of fifths and a list of major thirds, giving the temperament of each in fractions of a comma. (Note: Werckmeister used the organbuilder's notation of ^ for a downwards tempered or narrowed interval and v for an upward tempered or widened one. (This appears counterintuitive – it is based on the use of a conical tuning tool which would reshape the ends of the pipes.) A pure fifth is simply a dash. Werckmeister was not explicit about whether the syntonic comma or Pythagorean comma was meant: The difference between them, the so-called schisma, is almost inaudible and he stated that it could be divided up among the fifths.)

The last "Septenarius" tuning was not conceived in terms of fractions of a comma, despite some modern authors' attempts to approximate it by some such method. Instead, Werckmeister gave the string lengths on the monochord directly, and from that calculated how each fifth ought to be tempered.

== Werckmeister I (III): "correct temperament" based on 1/4 comma divisions ==
This tuning uses mostly pure (perfect) fifths, as in Pythagorean tuning, but each of the fifths C–G, G–D, D–A and B–F♯ is made smaller, i.e. tempered by 1/4 comma. No matter if the Pythagorean comma or the syntonic comma is used, the resulting tempered fifths are for all practical purposes the same as meantone temperament fifths. All major thirds are reasonably close to 400 cents and, because not all fifths are tempered, there is no wolf fifth and all 12 notes can be used as the tonic.

Werckmeister designated this tuning as particularly suited for playing chromatic music ("ficte"), which may have led to its popularity as a tuning for J. S. Bach's music in recent years.

Fifth	Tempering mark	Third	Tempering mark
C–G	^	C–E	1 v
G–D	^	C♯–F	4 v
D–A	^	D–F♯	2 v
A–E	–	D♯–G	3 v
E–B	–	E–G♯	3 v
B–F♯	^	F–A	1 v
F♯–C♯	–	F♯–B♭	4 v
C♯–G♯	–	G–B	2 v
G♯–D♯	–	G♯–C	4 v
D♯–B♭	–	A–C♯	3 v
B♭–F	–	B♭–D	2 v
F–C	–	B–D♯	3 v

Because a quarter of the Pythagorean comma is $\sqrt[4]{\frac{531441}{524288}}$, or $\frac{27}{32}\sqrt[4]{2}$, it is possible to calculate exact mathematical values for the frequency relationships and intervals:

Note	Exact frequency ratio	Value in cents
C	$\frac{1}{1}$	0
C♯	$\frac{256}{243}$	90.225
D	$\frac{64}{81} \sqrt{2}$	192.180
D♯	$\frac{32}{27}$	294.135
E	$\frac{256}{243} \sqrt[4]{2}$	390.225
F	$\frac{4}{3}$	498.045
F♯	$\frac{1024}{729}$	588.270
G	$\frac{8}{9}\sqrt[4]{2^3}$	696.090
G♯	$\frac{128}{81}$	792.180
A	$\frac{1024}{729} \sqrt[4]{2}$	888.270
B♭	$\frac{16}{9}$	996.090
B	$\frac{128}{81} \sqrt[4]{2}$	1092.180

== Werckmeister II (IV): another temperament included in the Orgelprobe, divided up through 1/3 comma ==
In Werckmeister II the fifths C–G, D–A, E–B, F♯–C♯, and B♭–F are tempered narrow by 1/3 comma, and the fifths G♯–D♯ and E♭–B♭ are widened by 1/3 comma. The other fifths are pure. Werckmeister designed this tuning for playing mainly diatonic music (i.e. rarely using the "black notes"). Most of its intervals are close to sixth-comma meantone. Werckmeister also gave a table of monochord lengths for this tuning, setting C=120 units, a practical approximation to the exact theoretical values. Following the monochord numbers the G and D are somewhat lower than their theoretical values but other notes are somewhat higher.

Fifth	Tempering mark	Third	Tempering mark
C–G	^	C–E	1 v
G–D	–	C♯–F	4 v
D–A	^	D–F♯	1 v
A–E	–	D♯–G	2 v
E–B	^	E–G♯	1 v
B–F♯	–	F–A	1 v
F♯–C♯	^	F♯–B♭	4 v
C♯–G♯	–	G–B	1 v
G♯–D♯	v	G♯–C	4 v
D♯–B♭	v	A–C♯	1 v
B♭–F	^	B♭–D	1 v
F–C	–	B–D♯	3 v

Note	Exact frequency ratio	Value in cents	Approximate monochord length	Value in cents
C	$\frac{1}{1}$	0	$120$	0
C♯	$\frac{16384}{19683} \sqrt[3]{2}$	82.405	$114\frac{1}{5}$ (misprinted as $114\frac{1}{2}$)	85.766
D	$\frac{8}{9} \sqrt[3]{2}$	196.090	$107\frac{1}{5}$	195.275
D♯	$\frac{32}{27}$	294.135	$101\frac{1}{5}$	294.990
E	$\frac{64}{81} \sqrt[3]{4}$	392.180	$95\frac{3}{5}$	393.542
F	$\frac{4}{3}$	498.045	$90$	498.045
F♯	$\frac{1024}{729}$	588.270	$85\frac{1}{3}$	590.224
G	$\frac{32}{27} \sqrt[3]{2}$	694.135	$80\frac{2}{5}$	693.320
G♯	$\frac{8192}{6561} \sqrt[3]{2}$	784.360	$76\frac{2}{15}$	787.721
A	$\frac{256}{243} \sqrt[3]{4}$	890.225	$71\frac{7}{10}$	891.587
B♭	$\frac{9}{4 \sqrt[3]{2}}$	1003.910	$67\frac{1}{5}$	1003.802
B	$\frac{4096}{2187}$	1086.315	$64$	1088.269

== Werckmeister III (V): an additional temperament divided up through 1/4 comma ==
In Werckmeister III the fifths D–A, A–E, F♯–C♯, C♯–G♯, and F–C are narrowed by 1/4 comma, and the fifth G♯–D♯ is widened by 1/4 comma. The other fifths are pure. This temperament is closer to equal temperament than the previous two.

Fifth	Tempering mark	Third	Tempering mark
C–G	–	C–E	2 v
G–D	–	C♯–F	4 v
D–A	^	D–F♯	2 v
A–E	^	D♯–G	3 v
E–B	–	E–G♯	2 v
B–F♯	–	F–A	2 v
F♯–C♯	^	F♯–B♭	3 v
C♯–G♯	^	G–B	2 v
G♯–D♯	v	G♯–C	4 v
D♯–B♭	–	A–C♯	2 v
B♭–F	–	B♭–D	3 v
F–C	^	B–D♯	3 v

Note	Exact frequency ratio	Value in cents
C	$\frac{1}{1}$	0
C♯	$\frac{8}{9} \sqrt[4]{2}$	96.090
D	$\frac{9}{8}$	203.910
D♯	$\sqrt[4]{2}$	300
E	$\frac{8}{9} \sqrt{2}$	396.090
F	$\frac{9}{8} \sqrt[4]{2}$	503.910
F♯	$\sqrt{2}$	600
G	$\frac{3}{2}$	701.955
G♯	$\frac{128}{81}$	792.180
A	$\sqrt[4]{8}$	900
B♭	$\frac{3}{\sqrt[4]{8}}$	1001.955
B	$\frac{4}{3} \sqrt{2}$	1098.045

== Werckmeister IV (VI): the Septenarius tunings ==
This tuning is based on a division of the monochord length into $196 = 7\times 7\times 4$ parts. The various notes are then defined by which 196-division one should place the bridge on in order to produce their pitches. The resulting scale has rational frequency relationships, so it is mathematically distinct from the irrational tempered values above; however in practice, both involve pure and impure sounding fifths. Werckmeister also gave a version where the total length is divided into 147 parts, which is simply a transposition of the intervals of the 196-tuning. He described the Septenarius as "an additional temperament which has nothing at all to do with the divisions of the comma, nevertheless in practice so correct that one can be really satisfied with it".

One apparent problem with these tunings is the value given to D (or A in the transposed version): Werckmeister writes it as "176", but the value is suspect: It produces a musically bad effect because the fifth G–D would then be very flat (more than half a comma); the third B♭–D would be pure, but D–F♯ would be more than a comma too sharp – all of which contradict the rest of Werckmeister's writings on temperament. In the illustration of the monochord division, the number "176" is written one place too far to the right, where 175 should be. Therefore it is conceivable that the number 176 is a mistake for 175, which gives a musically much more consistent result. Both values are given in the table below.

In the tuning with D=175, the fifths C–G, G–D, D–A, B–F♯, F♯–C♯, and B♭–F are tempered narrow, while the fifth G♯–D♯ is tempered wider than pure; the other fifths are pure.

Note	Monochord length	Exact frequency ratio	Value in cents
C	196	1/1	0
C♯	186	98/93	90.661
D	176 (175)	49/44 (28/25)	186.334 (196.198)
D♯	165	196/165	298.065
E	156	49/39	395.169
F	147	4/3	498.045
F♯	139	196/139	594.923
G	131	196/131	697.544
G♯	124	49/31	792.616
A	117	196/117	893.214
B♭	110	98/55	1000.020
B	104	49/26	1097.124

== External sources ==
- "196-EDL, 1568-EDL, and Septenarius tunings". 240edo.googlepages.com (blog). Equal divisions of length (EDL).
- de Vriendt, Broekaert. "Well tempering based on the Werckmeister definition". users.telenet.be/broekaert-devriendt (blog).
- "Well tempered based on Werckmeisters last book Musikalische Paradoxal-Discourse (1707) is equal temperament". 18th century quotes on J.S. Bach's temperament. academia.edu.
