= Stretto =

Term in music

The Italian term stretto [ˈstretto] (plural: stretti) has two distinct meanings in music:

1. In a fugue, stretto (German: Engführung) is the imitation of the subject in close succession, so that the answer enters before the subject is completed.
2. In non-fugal compositions, a stretto (also sometimes spelled stretta) is a passage, often at the end of an aria or movement, in faster tempo. Examples include the end of Franz Liszt's transcendental etude No.10, the end of the last movement of Beethoven's Fifth Symphony; measure 227 of Chopin's Ballade No. 3; measures 16-18 of his Prelude No. 4 in E minor; and measure 26 of his Etude Op. 10, No. 12, "The Revolutionary."

== Fugal stretto ==
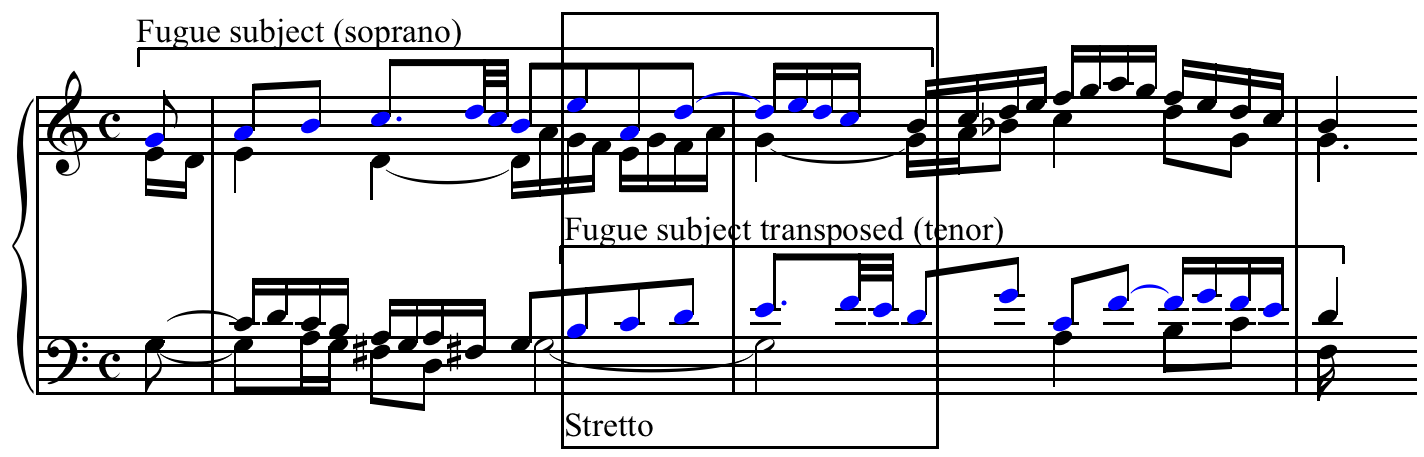
Example of stretto in the C-major fugue from J. S. Bach's The Well Tempered Clavier, Book I, BWV 846, mm. 20–23. (subject in blue).

The term stretto comes from the Italian past participle of stringere, and means "narrow", "tight", or "close". It applies in a close succession of statements of the subject in a fugue, especially in the final section. In stretto, the subject is presented in one voice and then imitated in one or more other voices, with the imitation starting before the subject has finished. The subject is therefore superimposed upon itself contrapuntally. Stretto is typically employed near the end of a fugue, where the 'piling-up' of two or more temporally off-set statements of the subject signals the arrival of the fugue's conclusion in climactic fashion.

For example, the C-major fugue from J. S. Bach’s The Well-Tempered Clavier, Book 1 (BWV 846) opens with an initial succession of statements of the subject, each at a distance of six beats:

Bach Fugue in C WTC1 opening bars

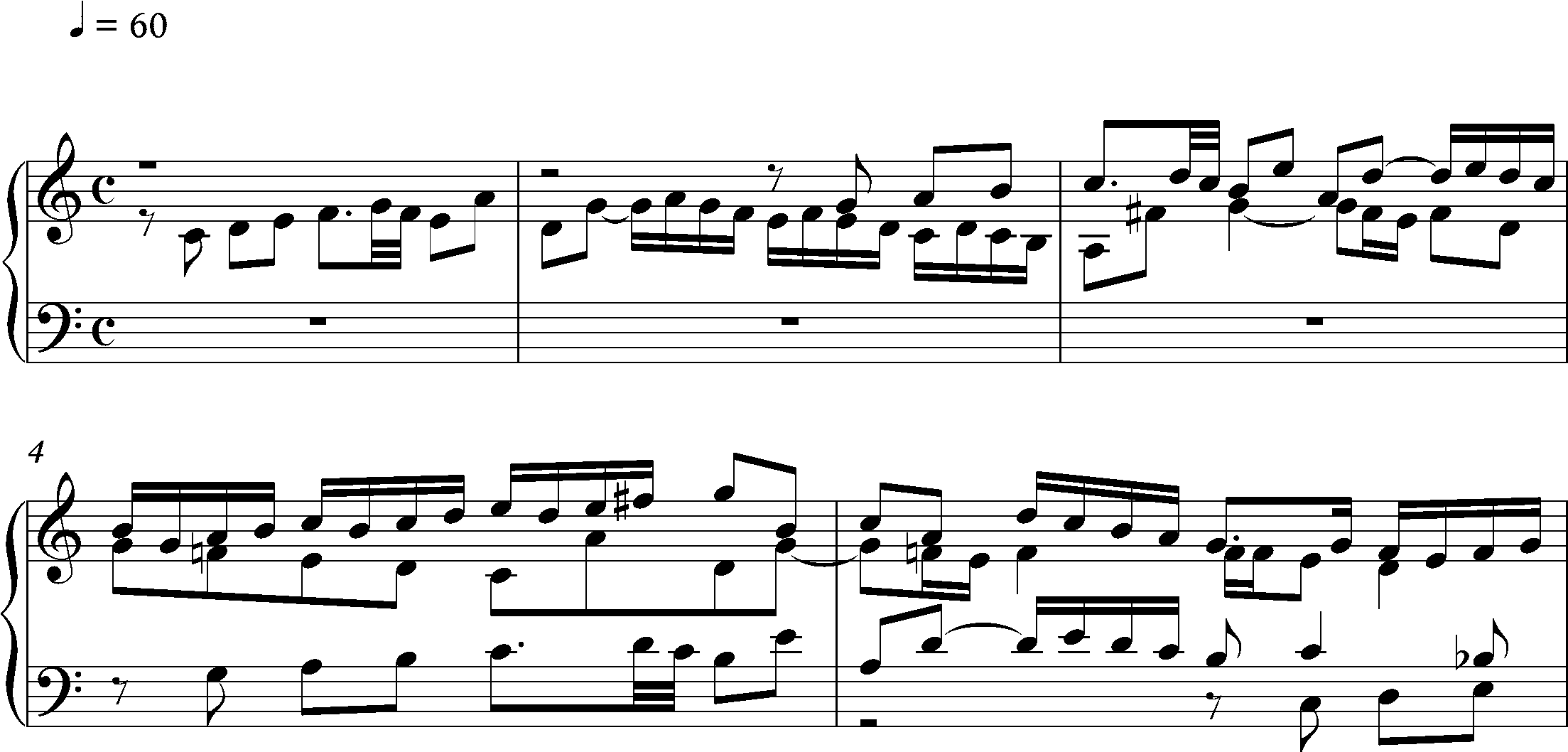
Bach Fugue in C BWV 846 opening bars

As the musical argument proceeds, the gap between the entries closes to two beats:

Bach Fugue in C WTC1 bars 14ff

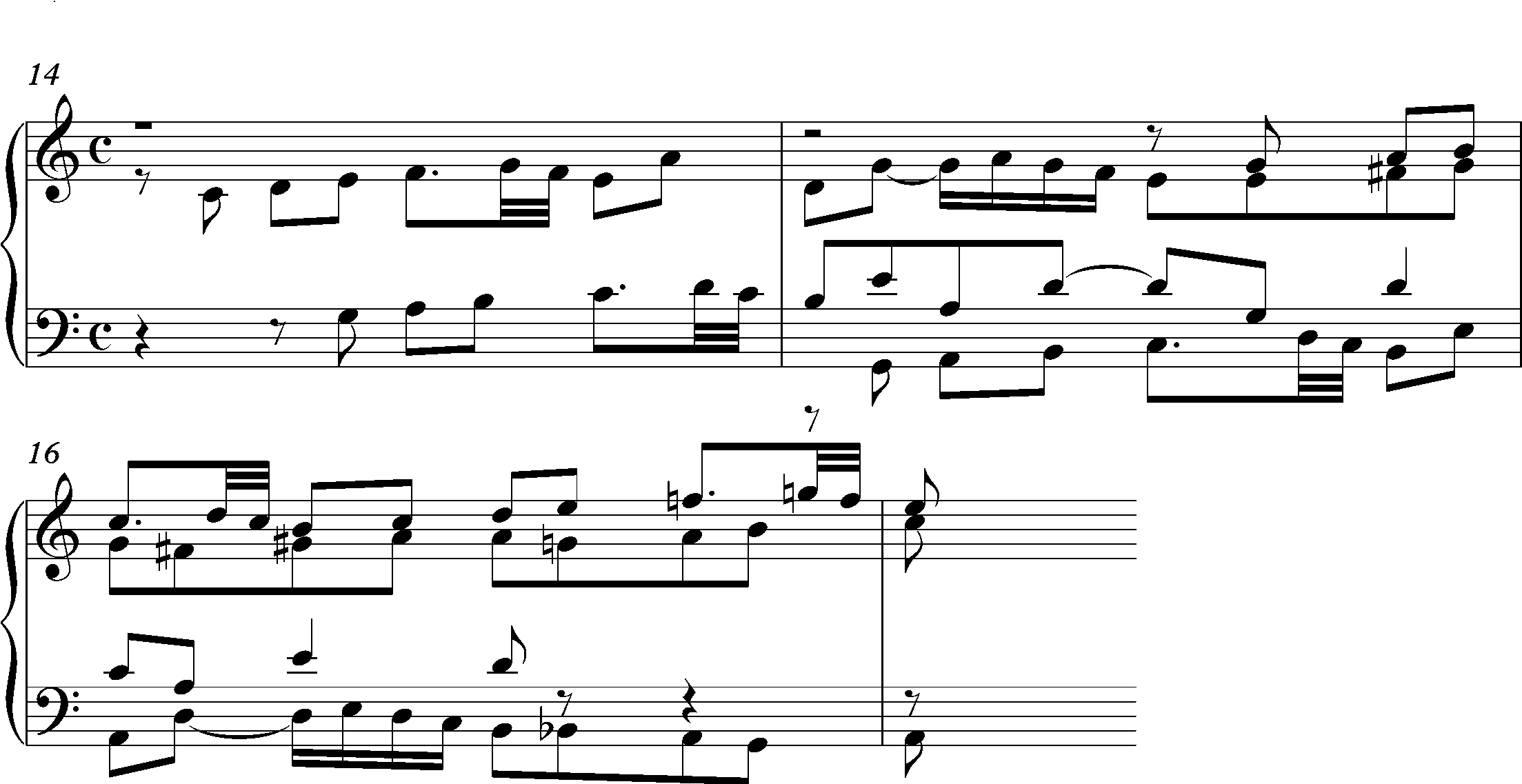
Bach Fugue in C BWV 846 bars 14–16

In the final bars, the entries are even closer, with the upper two voices following at a distance of just one beat:

Bach Fugue in C WTC1 bars 24-end

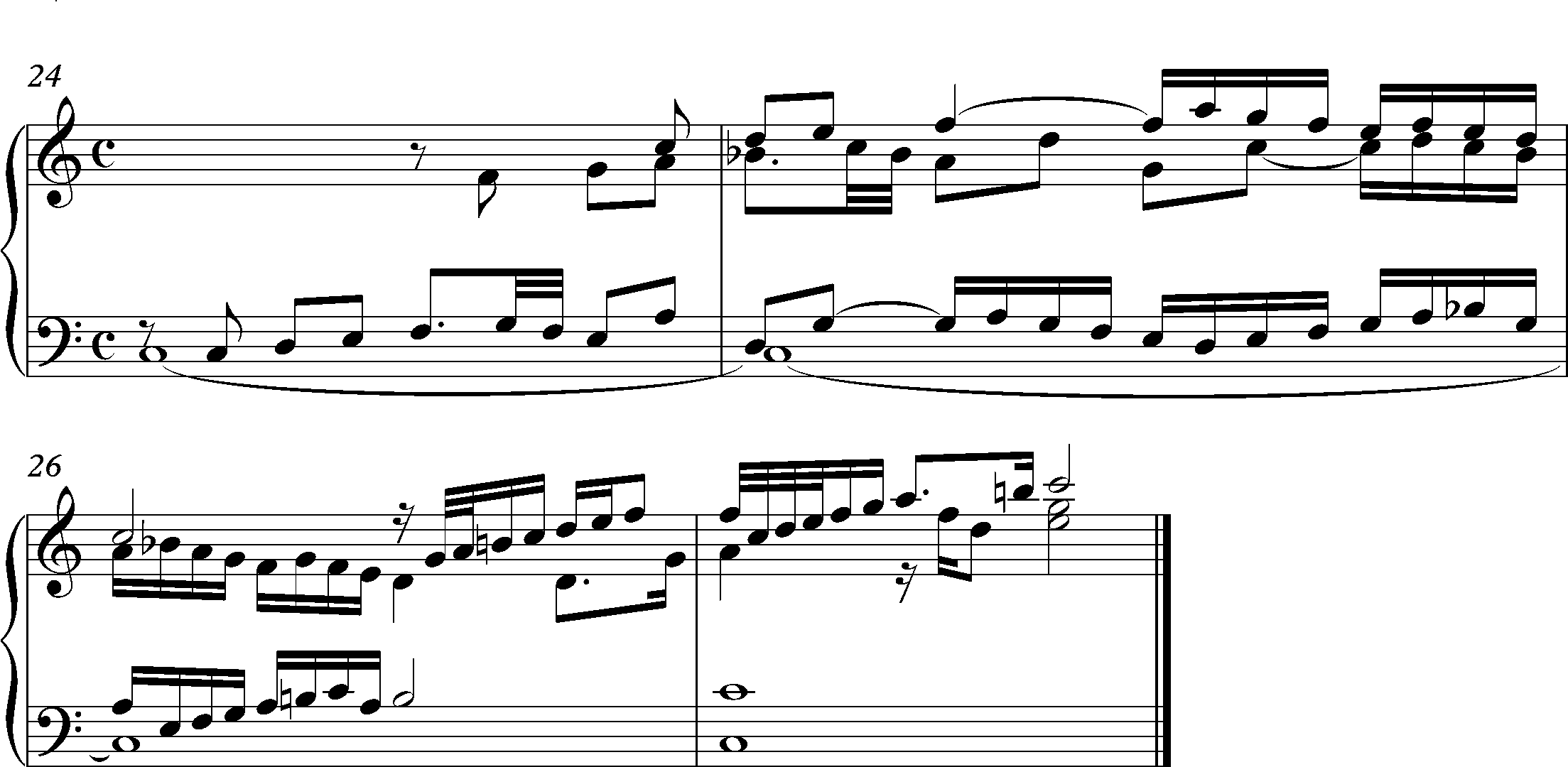
Bach Fugue in C BWV 846 concluding bars

The complete C-major fugue may be heard here:

J.S. Bach, The Well-Tempered Clavier
Book 1, Fugue No. 1 in C major (BWV 846)

Book 2, Prelude and Fugue No. 9 in E major (BWV 878)

In other instances, stretto serves to display contrapuntal prowess, as in the Fugue No. 9 in E major, BWV 878, where Bach follows a traditional exposition (subject accompanied by countersubject) with a counterexposition in which the subject accompanies itself, in stretto, followed by the countersubject accompanying itself.

Fugal stretto techniques may also be found in pieces that are not themselves fugues, such as the boisterous finale of Haydn’s Quartet in E flat, Op. 76 No. 6. In the following passage, bars 119–132, the theme is stated in the first violin with simple accompanying chord of the off-beats (bars 119–122). When repeated in bars 127–132, the viola and 'cello lead with the theme and the violins follow closely at one beat’s distance. This has the effect of “forever deceiving the listener as to where the main beat comes.”

Haydn Quartet Op.76 No. 6, finale bars 119–132

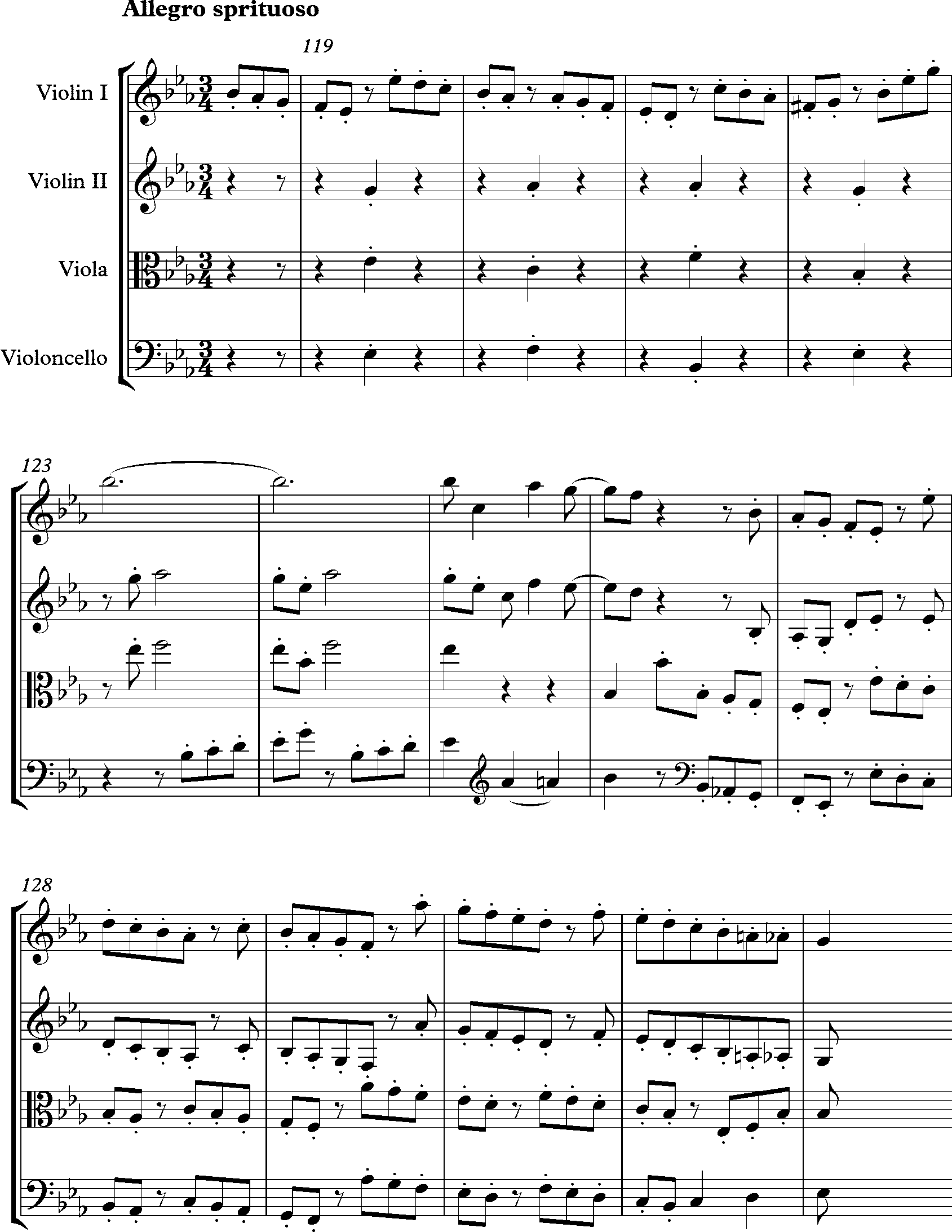
Haydn Quartet Op.76 No. 6, finale bars 119–132

== See also ==
- Music theory
