= Violin Sonata No. 35 (Mozart) =

Sonata for violin and piano by Wolfgang Amadeus Mozart

- by W. A. Mozart
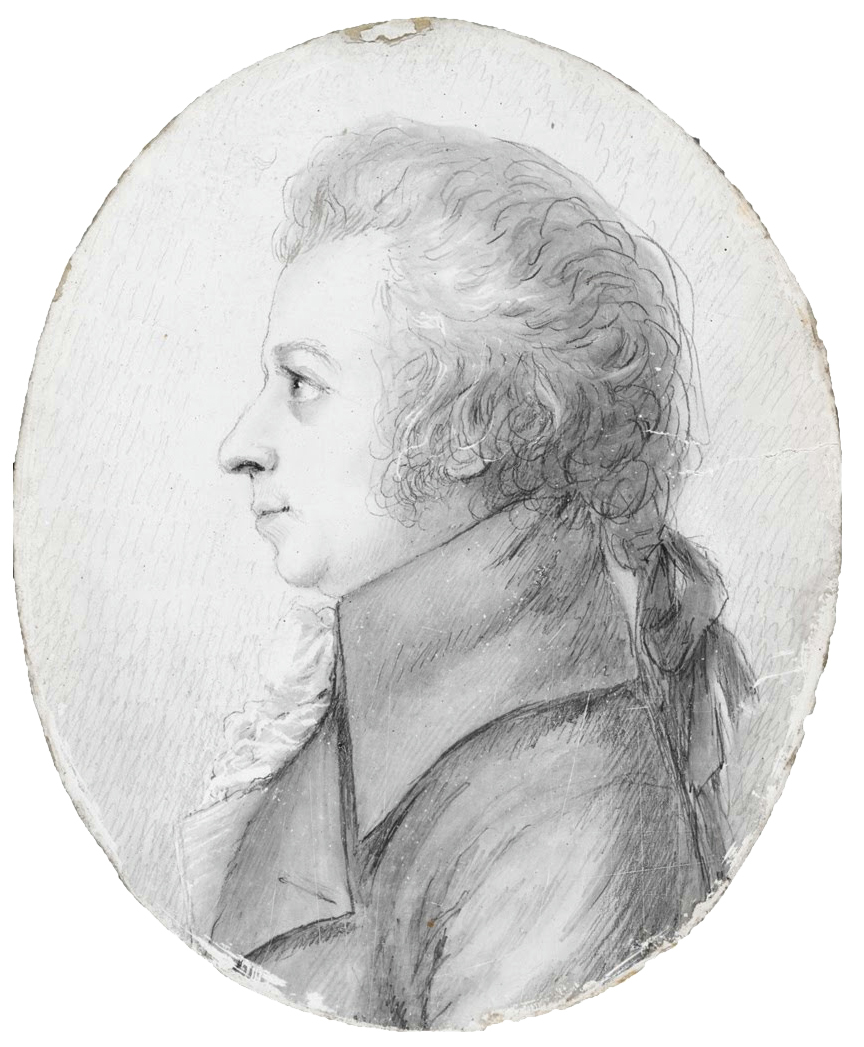
- Doris Stock's 1789 miniature of Mozart
- Key: A major
- Catalogue: K. 526
- Composed: Vienna, 1787
- Duration: c. 26 minutes
- Movements: 3
- Scoring: Violin and piano

The Sonata in A major for Violin and Keyboard, K. 526, was written in Vienna in 1787 by Wolfgang Amadeus Mozart. It is placed in the Köchel catalogue between the string serenade Eine kleine Nachtmusik (K. 525) and the opera Don Giovanni (K. 527).

There are three movements:

1. Molto allegro
2. Andante (in D major)
3. Presto

It is the last of Mozart's substantial violin sonatas, with the only remaining work he wrote for this combination, the sonata in F, K. 547 of 1788 being more of a sonatina. It is also considered by several authors, including Alfred Einstein, to be part of his last series of three great violin sonatas which starts with the Regina Strinasacchi sonata in B♭ K. 454 from 1784 (his annus mirabilis, the year also of the six great piano concertos 14 – 19 and the quintet for piano and winds) and continuing with the E♭ violin sonata from December 1785. The first movement is a movement in sonata form in 6/8 time, with more evenly divided contributions between the two instruments than in the earliest of his sonatas, an exposition divided between its two tonal groups (A and E major), and a compact but unwasteful development section.

The second movement has, for a classical period slow sonata form, an extended development—it is much more characteristic for slow movements in sonata form, especially middle slow movements, to have exceptionally brief middle sections before the return of the main material, and that is not the case here. The passage just before the recapitulation brings a sequence of enharmonic changes and, for the period, wide modulations. The finale is a rondo with a particularly agitated middle section.

== Discography ==
- Isaac Stern, violin and Yefim Bronfman, piano: Violine Sonatas K. 296 No. 17, K. 454 No. 32 and K. 526 No. 35 - 1994.
- Hilary Hahn, violin and Natalie Zhu, piano: Violine Sonatas K. 301 No. 18, K. 304 No. 21, K. 376 No. 24, and K. 526 No. 35 - 2005.
- Vineta Sareika, violin and Amandine Savary, piano: Violine Sonatas K. 376 No. 24, K. 379 No. 27 and K. 526 No. 35 - 2019.
