= 1784 in music =

== Events ==
- January 5 – In Paris, Antonio Salieri signs a contract with the Opéra for a work entitled Les Danaïdes.
- January 7 – Composer Pierre-Alexandre Monsigny marries Amélie de Villemagne.
- February 9 – The Piano Concerto No. 14 becomes the first entry in the catalogue of works by Wolfgang Amadeus Mozart.
- March – 28-year-old Mozart gives the first performances of his Piano Concerto No. 15 at the Trattnerhof and Burgtheater in Vienna.
- April 24 – Mozart writes to his father Leopold, recommending the work of newcomer Ignaz Pleyel.
- April 29 – Wolfgang Amadeus Mozart and violinist Regina Strinasacchi perform Mozart's Sonata in B-flat for Violin and Keyboard (K.454) for the first time, in the presence of Joseph II, Holy Roman Emperor.
- May 27 – June 5 – Handel Commemoration concerts in Westminster Abbey, London.
- June 13 – Wolfgang Amadeus Mozart's Piano Concerto No. 17 is performed for the first time, by his student, Barbara von Ployer. Giovanni Paisiello is in the audience.
- August 17 – Luigi Boccherini is given a pay rise of 12000 reals by his employer, the Infante Luis, Count of Chinchón.
- August 28 – In Vienna, Johann Georg Albrechtsberger's Mass in E flat is performed for the first time, with the orchestral arrangement replaced by organ accompaniment, in accordance with the preferences of Joseph II, Holy Roman Emperor.
- December 11 – Mozart is received into the Masonic lodge "Beneficence".
- The first opera is mounted at the unfinished Teatro Nuovo in Bergamo, Lombardy, Giuseppe Sarti's Medonte, re di Epiro.

== Classical music ==
- Ludwig van Beethoven - Piano Concerto No. 0
- Jean-Jacques Beauvarlet-Charpentier – Journal d'orgue 1–9
- Niel Gow – A Collection of Strathspey Reels, etc.
- Joseph Haydn
  - 6 Divertimentos, Hob.IV:6–11
  - Keyboard Sonata in G major, Hob.XVI:40 (no. 54)
  - Keyboard Sonata in B-flat major, Hob.XVI:41 (no. 55)
  - Keyboard Sonata in D major, Hob.XVI:42 (no. 56)
  - 24 Lieder, Hob.XXVIa:13–24 (second book)
- Michael Haydn – Symphony in B-flat major; Symphony in C major
- Sabine Hitzelberger – Für fülende Seelen am Klavier
- Edward Jones – Musical and Poetical Relicks of the Welsh Bards, including "Deck the Halls"
- Leopold Kozeluch – Keyboard Concerto in F major, P.IV:1
- Wolfgang Amadeus Mozart
  - Piano Concerto No. 14
  - Piano Concerto No. 15
- Giovanni Paisiello – Six quartets, Op. 1
- Joseph Reicha – Cello Concerto in D major
- Giovanni Battista Viotti – Duetto concertante for 2 Violins in D major; Duetto concertante for 2 Violins in D minor

== Opera ==
- Pasquale Anfossi – Issipile, May 8, King's Theatre, London.
- Luigi Cherubini – L'Idalide
- Domenico Cimarosa
  - L'apparenza inganna
  - Artaserse
  - I due supposti conti
  - I matrimoni impensati
  - L'Olimpiade, July 10, Teatro Eretenio, Vicenza.
  - La vanità delusa
- André Grétry
  - L'épreuve villageoise
  - Richard Coeur de Lion
- Joseph Haydn – Armida
- Thomas Linley – The Spanish Rivals
- Antonio Salieri
  - Les Danaïdes
  - Il ricco d'un giorno (libretto by Lorenzo Da Ponte)
- Andrea Luchesi – Ademira
- Giovanni Paisiello – Il Re Teodoro
- Niccolò Piccinni – Diane et Endymion
- Antonio Sacchini – Dardanus

== Births ==
- January 1 – William Beale, composer and organist (died 1854)
- January 27 – Martin-Joseph Mengal, composer (died 1851)
- January 29 – Ferdinand Ries, composer
- February 3 – John Fane, composer and diplomat
- February 27 – Job Plimpton, composer (died 1864)
- March 25 – François-Joseph Fétis, Belgian musicologist, composer, critic and teacher (died 1871)
- April 8 – Dionisio Aguado, guitarist and composer (died 1849)
- June 14 – Francesco Morlacchi, opera composer (died 1841)
- July 27 – George Onslow, composer (died 1853)
- August 5 – Louis Spohr, composer, violinist and conductor (died 1859)
- August 23
  - Jeanette Wässelius, operatic soprano (died 1853)
  - Henriette Löfman, composer (died 1836)
- October 15 – Thomas Hastings, composer (died 1872)
- October 16 – Karl Keller, composer and flautist (died 1855)
- November 7 – Friedrich Wilhelm Kalkbrenner, German pianist and composer
- date unknown – Samuel Simms, organist and composer (died 1868)
- November 28 – Ferdinand Ries, composer and friend of Beethoven (died 1838)

== Deaths ==
- March 4 – Ann Cargill, opera singer (born 1760) (drowned)
- July 1 – Wilhelm Friedemann Bach, composer (born 1710)
- August – Louis Anseaume, opera librettist
- August 6 – Karl Kohaut, lutenist and composer (born 1726)
- August 4 – Giovanni Battista Martini, composer (born 1706)
- September – John Bennett, organist and composer (born c.1735)
- September 5 – Maria Linley, singer (born 1763)
- September 12 – Manuel Blasco de Nebra, organist and composer (born 1750)
- October 5 (or 1785) – Antonín Kammel, violinist and composer (born 1730)
- November 6 – Anine Frölich, ballet dancer (born 1762)
- date unknown
  - John Pixell, poet and composer (born 1725)
  - Yekaterina Sinyavina, pianist and composer (date of birth unknown)
