= Violin Sonata No. 24 (Mozart) =

- by W. A. Mozart
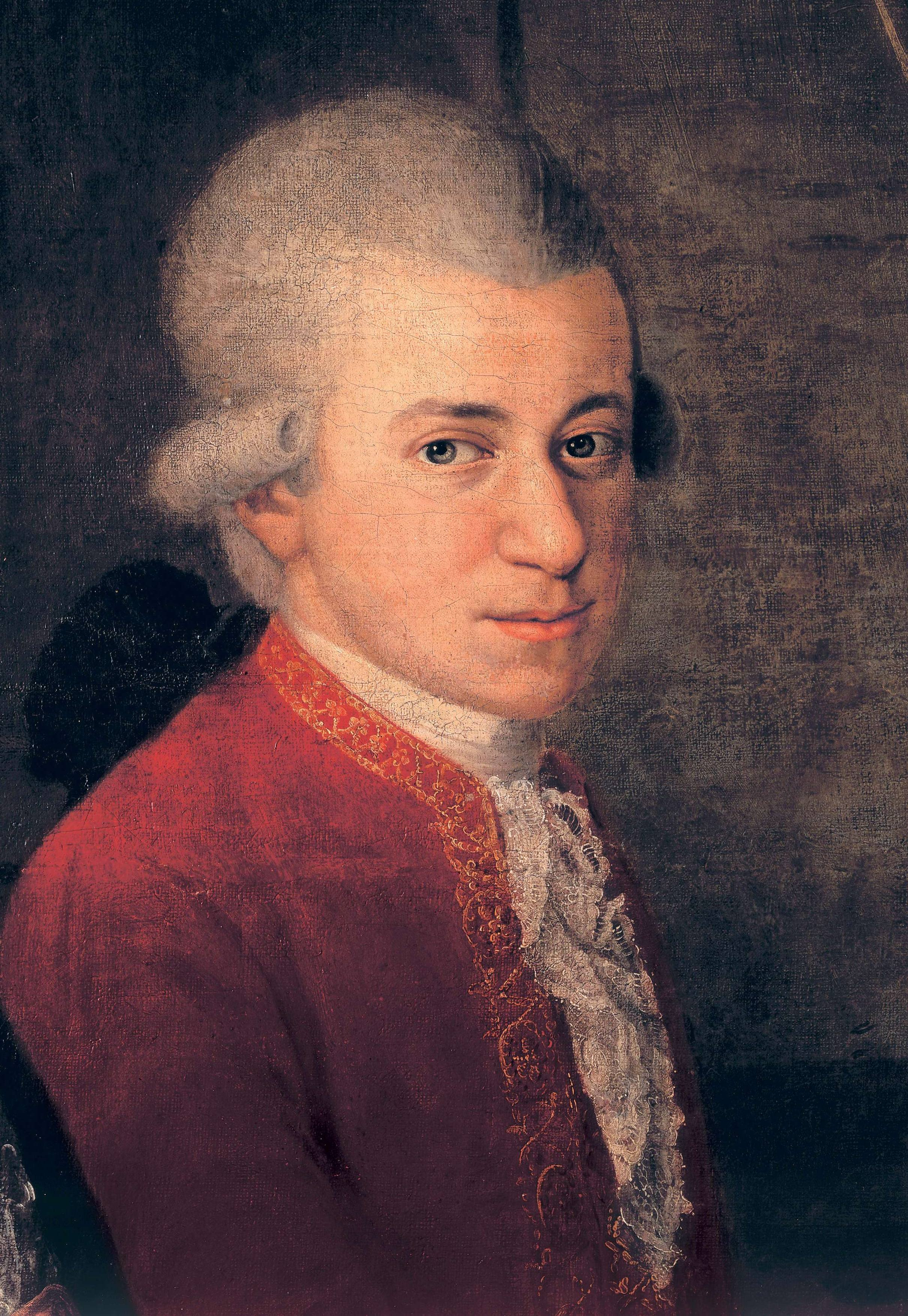
- Detail of Wolfgang from the 1780–81 Portrait of the Mozart Family
- Key: F major
- Catalogue: K. 376
- Composed: Vienna, 1781
- Dedication: Josepha Barbara Auernhammer
- Duration: c. 17 minutes
- Movements: 3
- Scoring: Violin and piano

Violin Sonata No. 24 in F major, K. 376, was composed by Wolfgang Amadeus Mozart in Vienna during the summer of 1781. Like all other sonatas of Op. 2, this piece also has three movements.

Later, this piece, along with three other sonatas by Mozart (violin sonatas Nos. 25 and 26 and piano sonata No. 17), were all transcribed for flute by Patrick Gallois.

This sonata, along with five other ones as a collection (K. 296 and K. 377–380), were all dedicated to Josepha Barbara Auernhammer (Mozart's pupil), to whom he had also dedicated the Sonata for Two Pianos in D major, K. 448.

== Movements ==
The sonata is in three movements:

1. Allegro
2. Andante, in B♭ major
3. Rondò: Allegretto grazioso

== Discography ==
- Hilary Hahn, violin and Natalie Zhu, piano: Violine Sonatas K. 301 No. 18, K. 304 No. 21, K. 376 No. 24, and K. 526 No. 35 - 2005.
- Vineta Sareika, violin and Amandine Savary, piano: Sonatas K. 376 No. 24, K. 379 No. 27 and K. 526 No. 35 - 2019.
