= 1855 in music =

== Events ==
- February 17 – Franz Liszt gives the first performance of his Piano Concerto No. 1, conducted by Hector Berlioz in Weimar.
- March–June – Richard Wagner stays in London to conduct a series of concerts.
- June 13 - Twentieth opera of Giuseppe Verdi "Les vêpres siciliennes" (The Sicilian Vespers) is premiered in Paris.
- July 5 – Jacques Offenbach inaugurates performances of operettas as director of his own theater, the Théâtre des Bouffes-Parisiens.
- Late autumn – Mily Balakirev meets Mikhail Glinka in Saint Petersburg. Their friendship cements the former's ambition to foster Russian nationalist music.
- November 27 – Piano Trio No. 1 of Brahms is given its first public performance at Dodsworth's Hall in Manhattan on Broadway at 11th Street. It is the earliest performance of Brahms' music in the United States
- December 3 – The Piano Trio in G minor by Bedřich Smetana is given its first public performance in Prague.
- Tchaikovsky takes private music lessons with Rudolph Kündinger, who tells Tchaikovsky's father that he sees nothing to suggest a future composer.

== Bands formed ==
- Black Dyke Mills Band re-formed after failure of its immediate predecessor, the Queenshead Band in Queensbury, West Yorkshire, England.

== Popular music ==
- Stephen Foster – "Come Where My Love Lies Dreaming"
- George Martin Lane – "The Lone Fish Ball"
- Caroline Norton – "Juanita"
- words Septimus Winner (as "Alice Hawthorne") music Richard Milburn – "Listen to the Mocking Bird"

== Classical music ==
- Georges Bizet – Symphony in C
- Franz Berwald – Piano Concerto in D
- Eduard Franck – String Quartet in F minor op. 49 ()
- Charles Gounod – Symphony No. 1 in D
- Stephen Heller
  - 2 Tarantelles, Op.85
  - Im Walde, Op.86
- Friedrich Hermann – Capriccio No.1 for 3 Violins, Op.2
- Franz Liszt
  - Book 1 of Années de pèlerinage
  - Prelude and Fugue on B-A-C-H
  - Les préludes, S.97
  - Prometheus, S.99
  - 3 Lieder aus Schillers "Wilhelm Tell", S.292
  - Wie singt die Lerche schön, S.312
- Anton Rubinstein – Quintet for Piano and Winds Op. 55 (probably from this year)
- Camille Saint-Saëns
  - Six Bagatelles for piano, Op. 3
  - Quintet for Piano and Strings, Op. 14
- Bedřich Smetana – Piano Trio in G minor, Op. 15
- Louis Spohr – 6 Gesänge, Op.154

== Opera ==
- George Frederick Bristow – Rip van Winkle
- Edmond de la Fontaine – D'Mumm Sěs
- Fromental Halévy – L'inconsolable
- Jacques Offenbach – one-act operettas
  - Ba-ta-clan
  - Les deux aveugles
- Giuseppe Verdi – Les vêpres siciliennes

== Musical theatre ==
- Po-ca-hon-tas, or The Gentle Savage (Music: James Gaspard Maeder, Book and Lyrics: John Brougham) Broadway production opened Wallack's Lyceum Theatre on December 24 and transferred to the Bowery Theatre on June 28, 1856. Featuring John Brougham as John Smith.

== Births ==
- January 20 – Ernest Chausson, composer (d. 1899)
- February 15 – Gustav Hollaender, composer (died 1915)
- February 18 – Vera Timanova, Russian pianist
- March 12 – Eduard Birnbaum, cantor (died 1920)
- April 18 – Josef Gruber, composer (died 1933)
- May 2 – Theodore Moses Tobani, composer (died 1933)
- May 9 – Julius Röntgen, composer (d. 1932)
- May 10 – Carl Kiefert, conductor (died 1937)
- May 11 – Anatoly Lyadov, conductor, composer and music teacher (d. 1914)
- June 5 – Hanuš Wihan, cellist (died 1920)
- June 17 – Fritz Kauffmann, composer (died 1934)
- July 25 – Edward Solomon, pianist, conductor and composer (died 1895)
- August 2 – Cornélie van Zanten, opera singer and teacher (d. 1946)
- August 27 – Domenico Salvatori, castrato singer (d. 1909)
- September 6 – Ferdinand Hummel, composer (died 1928)
- September 9 – Michele Esposito, pianist and composer (d. 1929)
- October 16 – William Barclay Squire, musicologist (died 1927)
- October 30 – Károly Aggházy, composer (died 1918)
- November 1 – Guido Adler, musicologist (died 1941)
- November 6 – Paul Kalisch, singer (d. 1946)
- December 7 – Gunhild Rosén, ballerina
- December 23 – Alan Gray, composer (died 1935)
- December 26 – Arnold Mendelssohn, composer (died 1933)

== Deaths ==
- January 25 – Gaetano Rossi, librettist (b. 1774)
- February 1 – Claus Harms, researcher of Lutheran hymns (b. 1778)
- February 27 – Louis Lambillotte, composer and music palaeographer (b. 1796)
- March 17 – Ramon Carnicer, conductor and composer (b. 1789)
- April 12 – Pedro Albéniz, pianist and composer (b. 1795)
- April 30 – Henry Rowley Bishop, composer (b. 1786)
- July 19 – Karl Keller, composer and flautist (b. 1784)
- September 27 – August Lanner, conductor and composer (b. 1835)
- November 9 – Domenico Cosselli, operatic bass-baritone (b. 1801)
- November 21 – Olea Crøger, collector of Norwegian folk tunes (b. 1801)
- November 25 – Thomas Commuck, composer (born 1804)
- December 2 – Frédéric Bérat, songwriter and composer (b. 1801)
- Marie Antoinette Petersén, singer and member of the Royal Swedish Academy of Music (b. 1771)
