= Luxembourgish wine =

Wine making in Luxembourg

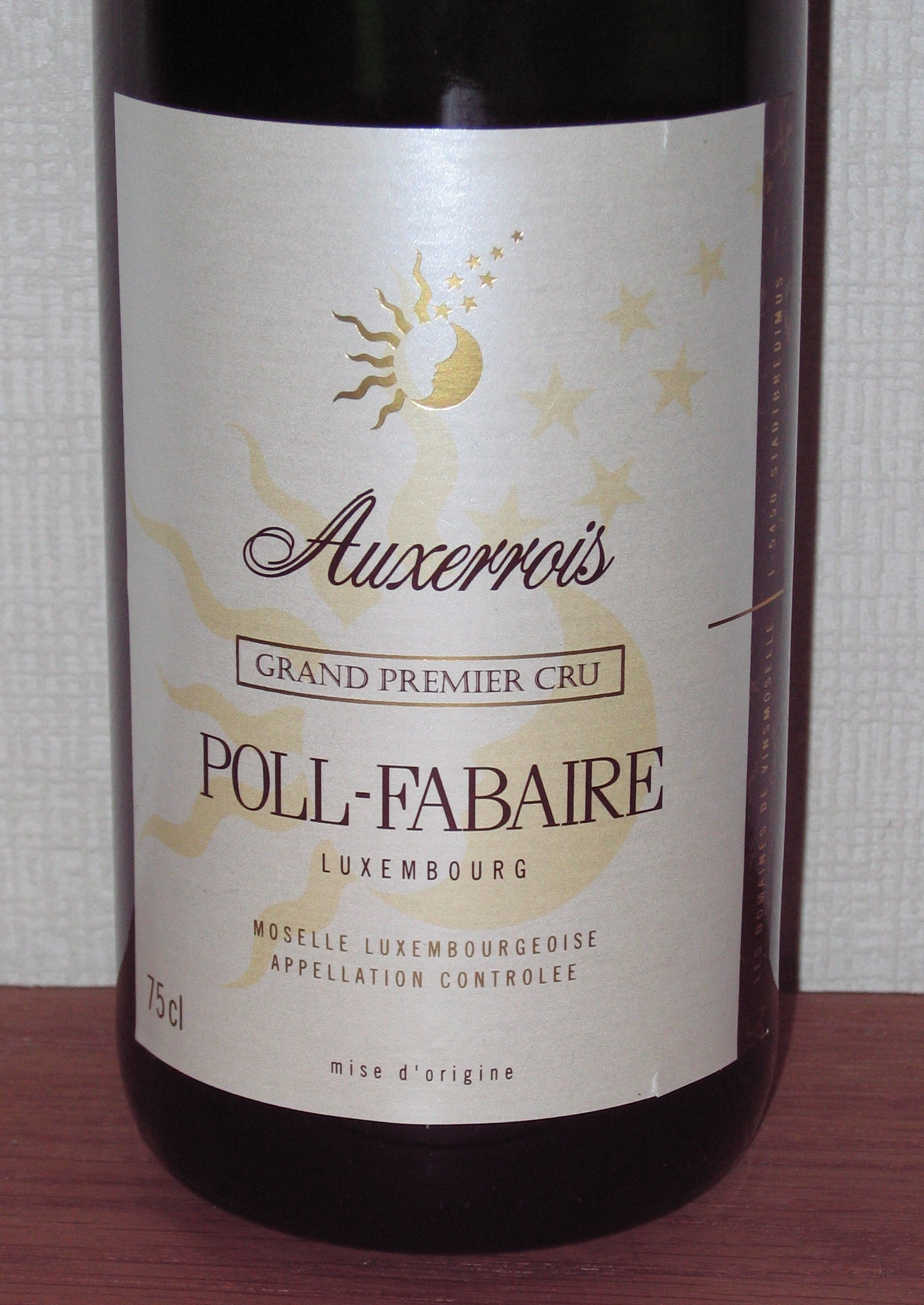
A bottle of Auxerrois wine from Luxembourg

Luxembourgish wine is primarily produced in the southeastern part of the Grand Duchy of Luxembourg, with vineyards overlooking the river Moselle. Along this river, which for 42 km makes up part of the border between Luxembourg and Germany, wine is made in three countries. There is a continuous history of winemaking along Moselle and in Luxembourg going back to Ancient Roman times. Wine production in 2006/07 was 123,652 hectoliter from 1,237 hectares (3,060 acres) of vineyards. Out of total wine exports of 87,776 hectoliter in 2005/06, 71,726 hectoliter or 82% was exported to nearby Belgium. Exports to Germany were the second largest at 8,168 hectoliter, or 9%, and is to a large extent made up of base wine in bulk for the production of blended Sekt rather than being sold bottled with "Luxembourg" anywhere on the label. Therefore, very little Luxembourgish wine is seen outside Luxembourg and Belgium.

In terms of volume, the wine production in Luxembourg is dominated by a number of winemaking cooperatives. The cooperatives in Greiveldange, Grevenmacher, Remerschen, Stadtbredimus and Wellenstein source their wines from over 800 hectares of vineyards (almost two thirds of Luxembourg's vineyard surface) and sell their wines under the common name of "Vinsmoselle". In addition, they operate a sparkling wine plant in Wormeldange, which produces wines under the label Poll-Fabaire.

== Wine styles ==
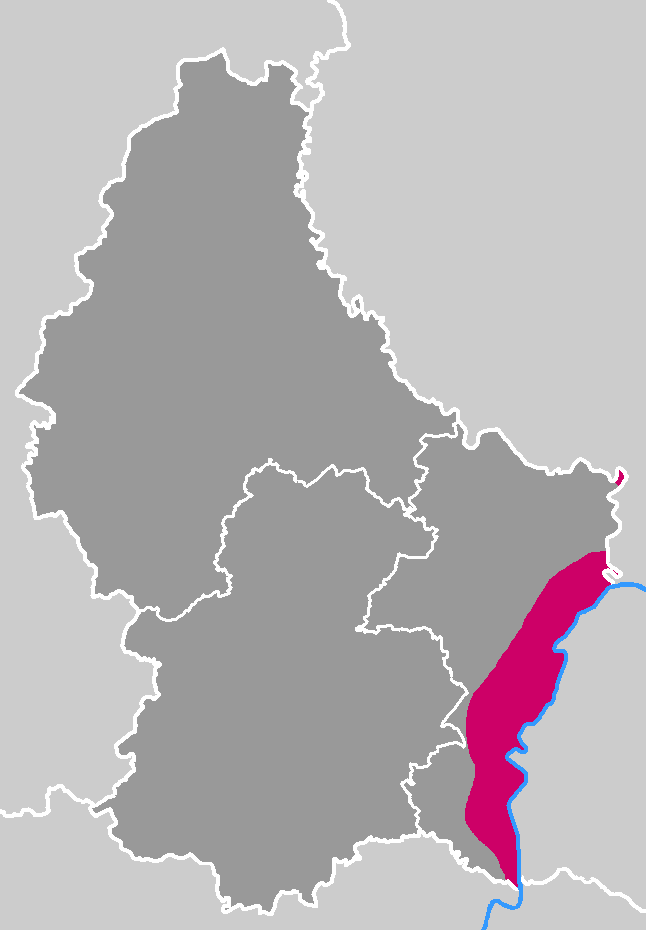
The location of the wine-producing region within the Grand Duchy of Luxembourg, along river Moselle

Luxembourg mainly produces dry white wines and sparkling wine under the designation Crémant. There are also some rosé and red wines made, as well as some sweet wines.

In contrast to the downstream German wine region Mosel, Luxembourg has very little tradition of producing semi-sweet or sweet wines, despite a significant similarity in terms of grape varieties. Rather, the wines of Luxembourg have been produced as a kind of cold climate version of traditional, dry Alsace wines.

== Grape varieties ==
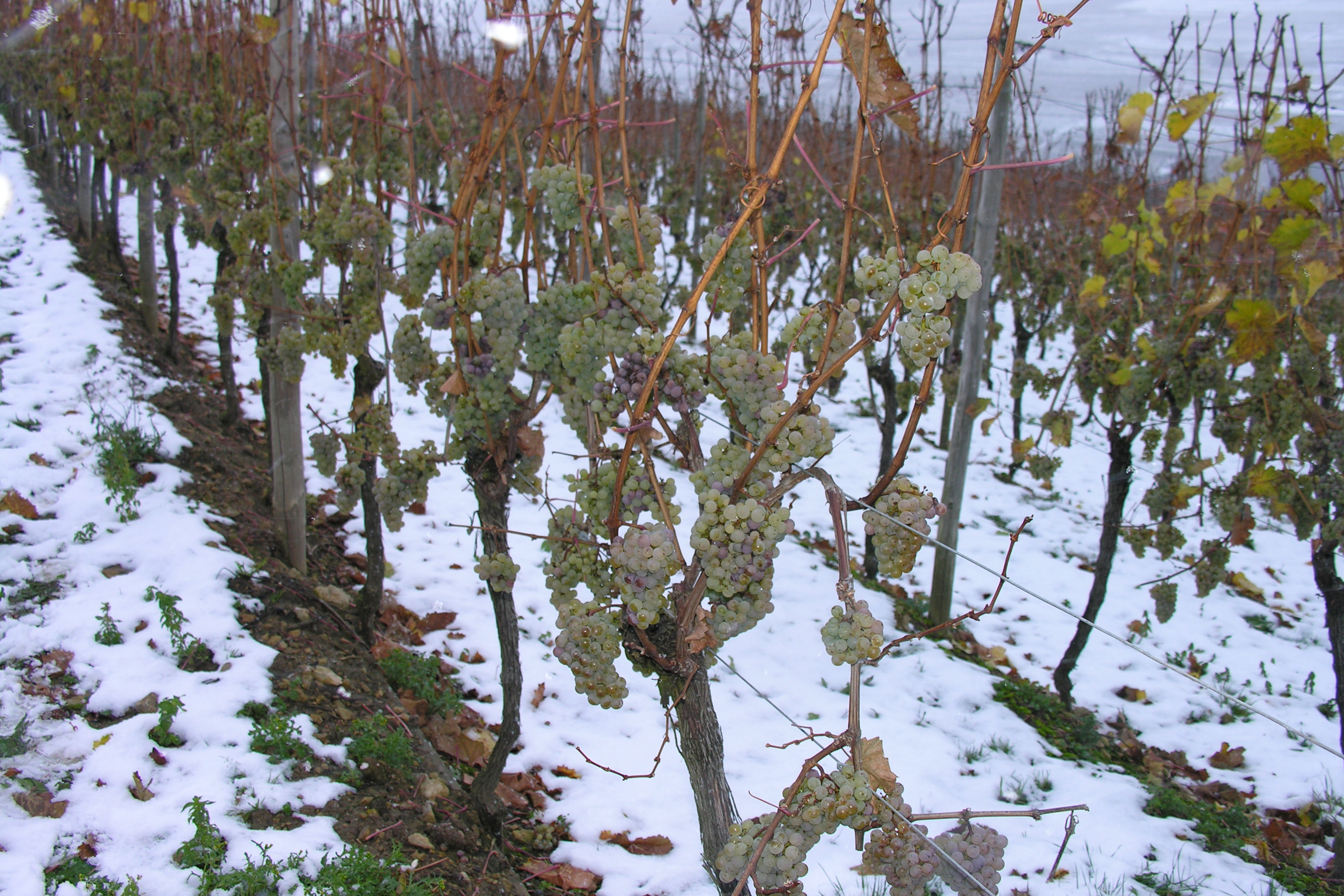
Grapes left hanging on the vine in Luxembourg to produce ice wine.

Common grape varieties in Luxembourg, and the vineyard surface they covered in 2006, are:

- Müller-Thurgau, usually under the name Rivaner: 377.1 ha (29.0%)
- Auxerrois blanc: 184.2 ha (14.2%)
- Pinot gris: 177.5 ha (13.7%)
- Riesling: 165.8 ha (12.8%)
- Pinot blanc: 143.1 ha (11.0%)
- Elbling: 122.9 ha (9.5%)
- Pinot noir, the only red wine grape above 1%: 88.2 ha (6.8%)
- Gewürztraminer: 18.8 ha (1.4%)
- Chardonnay: 14.8 ha (1.1%)

== History ==
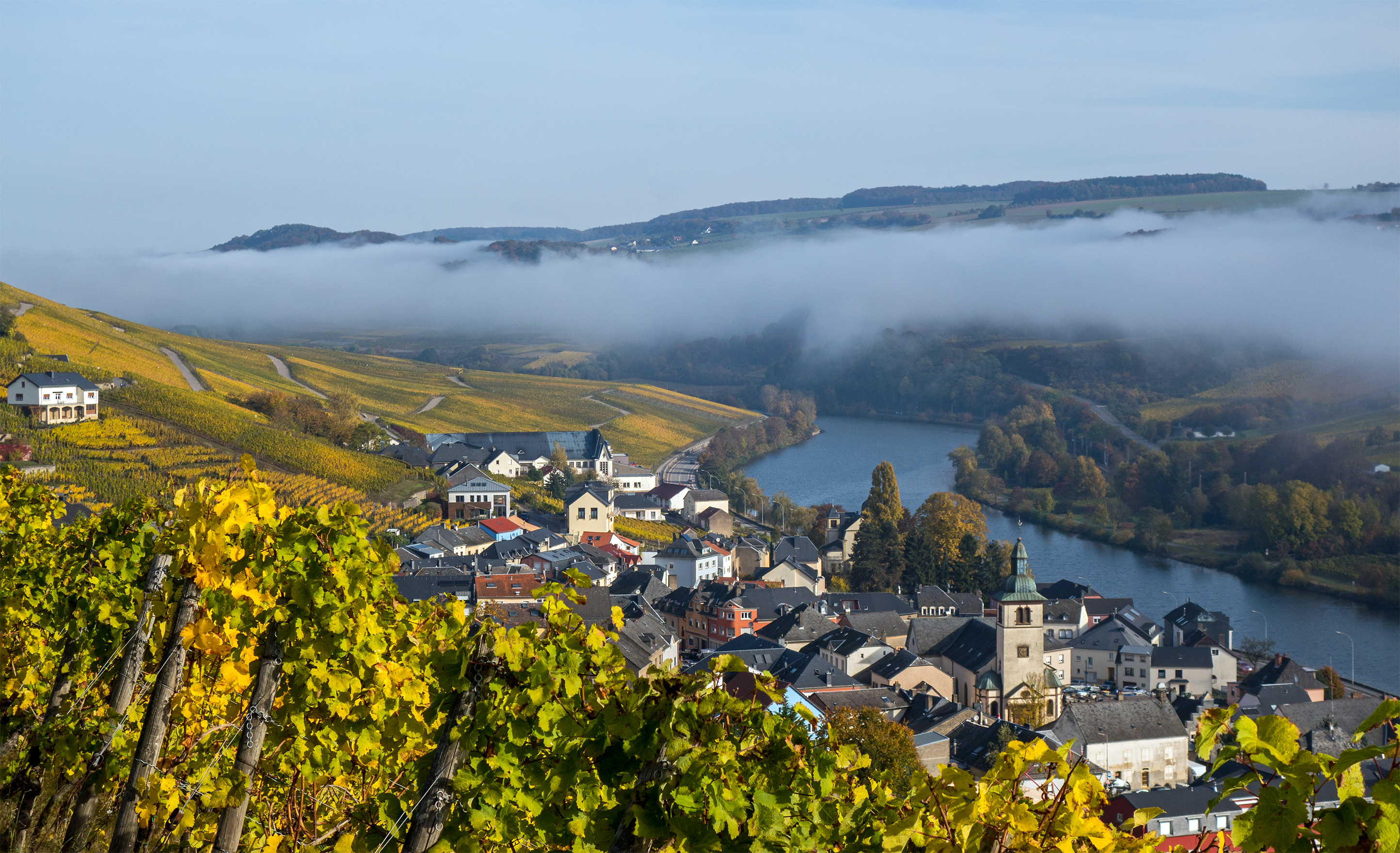
Vineyards in Wormeldange

After World War I and the end of the Zollverein, Luxembourgish viticulture faced a difficult situation. Under the Zollverein, Luxembourgish wine producers had been content to produce a maximum quantity of low-quality wine such as Elbling, to be exported to Germany where it would be blended with wines of the Rhine. The establishment of a customs barrier between the two banks of the Moselle disrupted this situation. With the loss of the German market, Luxembourgish viticulture had to adapt itself. The existing grape varieties had to be gotten rid of, to be replaced by varieties that would yield quality wines. Elbling made way for Riesling-Sylbaner, Riesling, Pinot, and Auxerrois. At the same time the vine-growing surface area was substantially reduced, getting rid of the low-quality sites. The surface area went from 1,645 ha in 1914 to 1,000 ha in 1939.

Winemaking cooperatives were created to facilitate the sale of the grape harvest. An "Institut vini-viticole" was created in Remich in 1925, to conduct research and advise wine-makers. In 1935 the label "Marque Nationale" was introduced to guarantee a consistent quality. This process of adaptation can be considered completed by the mid-1930s. On average two-thirds of produce were now consumed domestically, while the rest was exported, mostly to Belgium. The Moselle area was the only region of the country which had opted for Belgium over France as an economic partner in the referendum of 1919.

During 1983–1987, 57% of produce was exported, four-fifths of this to Belgium.

== Classification ==
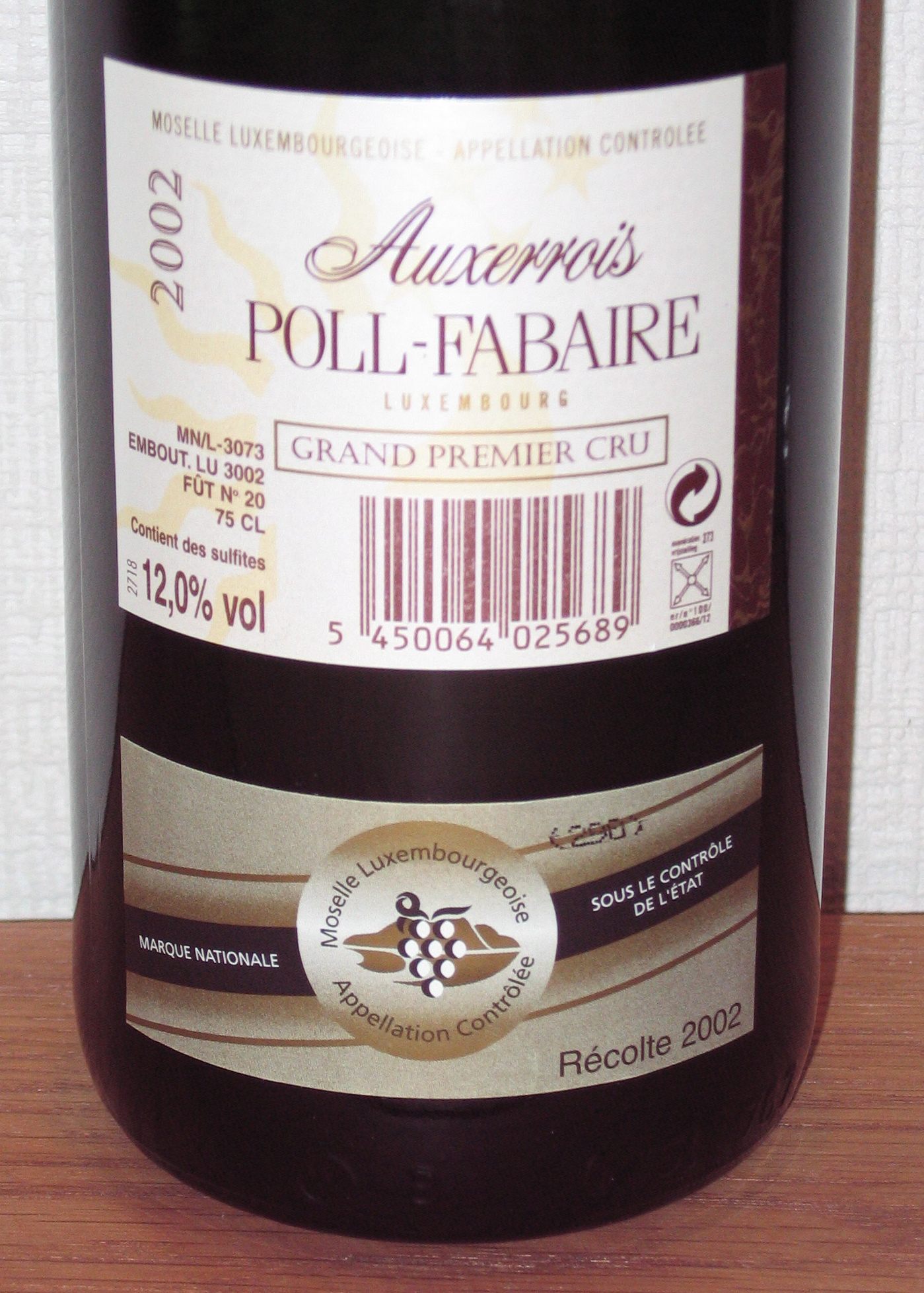
The back label of a bottle of Auxerrois wine from Luxembourg. Note the Marque Nationale and the Grand Premier Cru designation.

All official wine designations in Luxembourg are French language terms. One single appellation is used for all of Luxembourg: Moselle Luxembourgeoise. This designation, usually referred to as the Marque Nationale (national seal), indicates that the wine is made entirely from Luxembourgish grapes and fulfills certain requirements. The Marque Nationale was introduced in 1935.

Wines allowed the national seal can also carry three additional quality designations: Vin classé, Premier Cru or Grand Premier Cru, which have been used since 1959. These designations are awarded the individual wine after tasting by an official committee, which rates the wines on a 20-point scale.

- Wines that score less than 12 points are denied an official classification, and may not display the Marque Nationale.
- Wines that score a minimum of 12.0 points may be sold as Marque Nationale - Appellation Contrôlée. At this level, the wine can be evaluated before it is bottled.
- Wines that score 14.0-15.9 points after being bottled (i.e., at a second evaluation) are allowed the designation Vin classé in addition to Marque Nationale - Appellation Contrôlée.
- Wines that score a minimum of 16.0 points after being bottled are allowed the designation Premier Cru.
- Wines that are allowed the Premier Cru designation may be submitted for a third tasting, and those wines which score a minimum of 18.0 points in this tasting are allowed the designation Grand Premier Cru.

Since the terms Premier Cru and Grand Cru are used in France to classify vineyards or wine estates, it has been suggested that the different use of these terms in Luxembourg is somewhat confusing to the consumer.

There are three different classifications for sweet "specialty wines", differentiated by means of production:

- Vendanges tardives is a late harvest wine, either naturally sweet or affected by botrytis.
- Vin de glace is an ice wine, made from grapes harvested in the frozen state.
- Vin de paille is a straw wine, made from dried grapes.

The exact requirements with regard to must weight is different for the three categories and depends on the grape variety, but falls in the range 95 to 130 degrees Oechsle.

== Crémant de Luxembourg ==
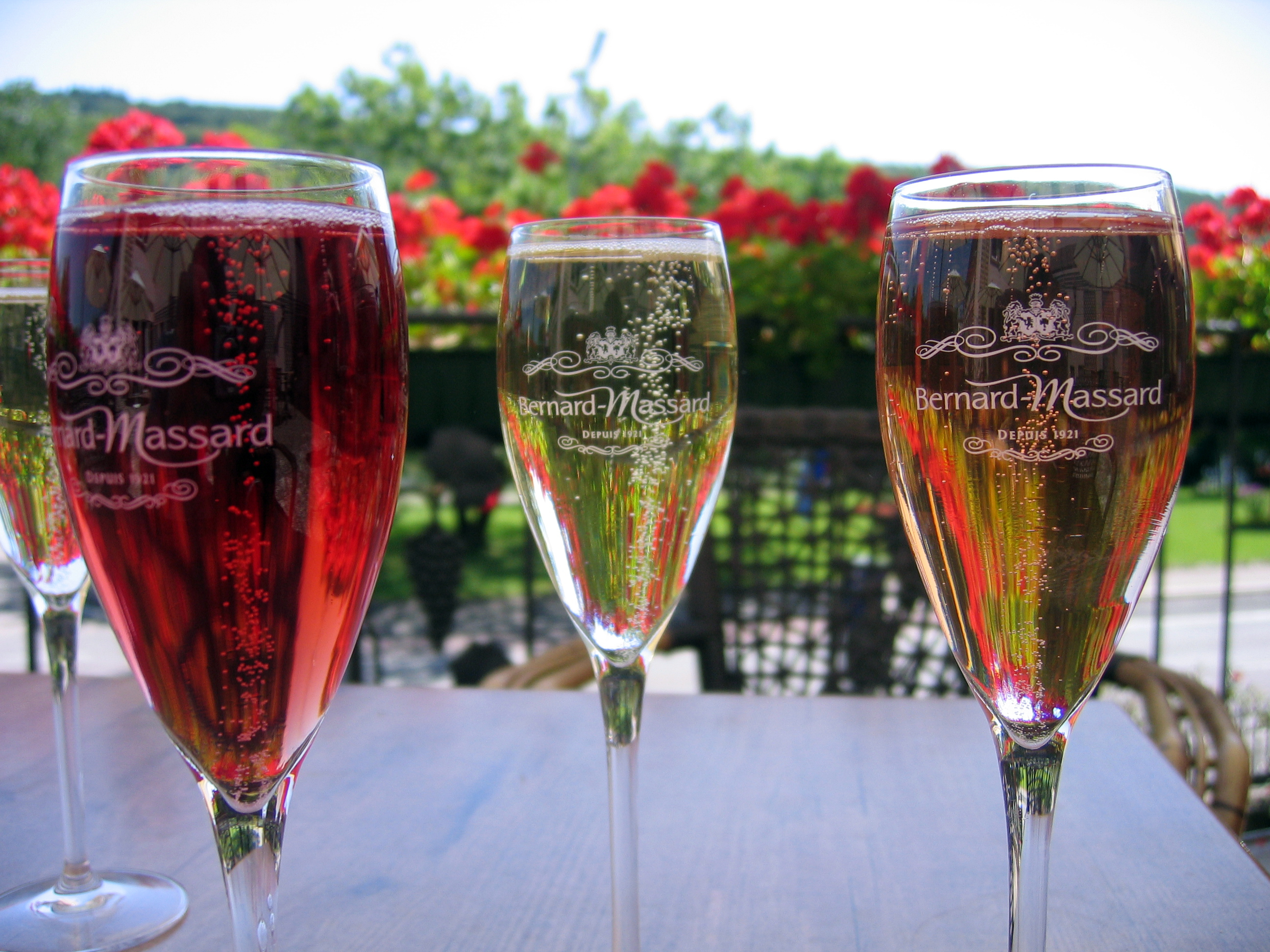
Sparkling Crémant de Luxembourg.

The Crémant de Luxembourg designation for sparkling wine is also awarded within the framework of the Marque Nationale, meaning e.g. that only domestic grapes are allowed in the production. Therefore, in difference to the classification used for French crémants, Crémant de Luxembourg is a special type of wine within the Moselle Luxembourgeoise appellation, rather than an appellation in its own right. Some sparkling wine produced in Luxembourg is just labelled Crémant and does not display the Marque Nationale. Such sparkling wines are produced partially or entirely from imported grapes, must or base wine.

== See also ==
- Wine Museum, Ehnen
- Winemaking
