= Plimpton =

Plimpton may refer to:

== People ==
- Calvin Plimpton (1918–2007), American educator
- Charles Plimpton (1894–1948), English businessman
- Francis T. P. Plimpton (1900–1983), American diplomat and lawyer
- George Plimpton (1927–2003), American journalist and actor
- George Arthur Plimpton (1855–1936), American publisher and philanthropist
- James Leonard Plimpton (1828–1911), American inventor
- Job Plimpton (1784–1864), American composer
- Martha Plimpton (born 1970), American actress
- Shelley Plimpton (born 1947), American actress

== Places ==
- Plimpton–Winter House, in Wrentham, Massachusetts
- Simon Plimpton Farmhouse, in Southbridge, Massachusetts

== Other ==
- Debevoise & Plimpton, an American law firm
- Plimpton Prize, an American literary award named for George Plimpton
- Plimpton 322, a Babylonian clay tablet named for George Arthur Plimpton
- Plimpton Sieve Portrait of Queen Elizabeth I, a painting named for George Arthur Plimpton

== See also ==
- Plympton (disambiguation)
