= Violin Sonata in G major =

Violin Sonata in G major may refer to:

- Violin Sonata No. 18 (Mozart)
- Violin Sonata No. 27 (Mozart)
- Violin Sonata No. 8 (Beethoven)
- Violin Sonata No. 10 (Beethoven)
- Violin Sonata No. 1 (Brahms)
- Violin Sonata No. 2 (Grieg)
- Violin Sonata No. 2 (Ravel)
- Violin Sonata (Shostakovich)
