= Violin Sonata No. 27 (Mozart) =

- by W. A. Mozart
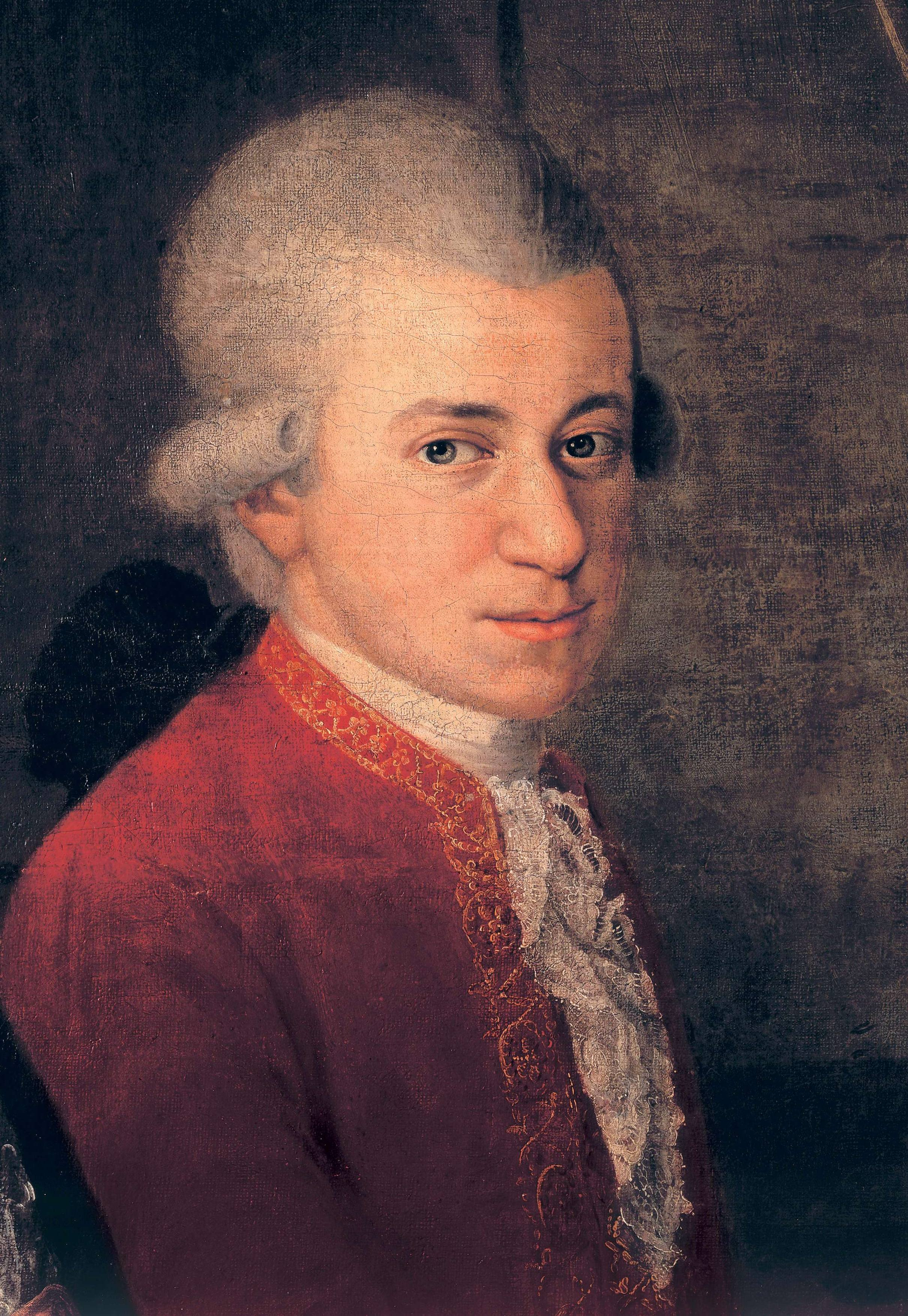
- Detail of Wolfgang from the 1780–81 Portrait of the Mozart Family
- Key: G major
- Catalogue: K. 379/373a
- Composed: Vienna, 1781
- Published: Vienna, November 1781
- Publisher: Artaria
- Duration: c. 18 minutes
- Movements: 2
- Scoring: Violin and piano

Violin Sonata No. 27 in G major (K. 379/373a) was composed by Wolfgang Amadeus Mozart in Vienna in 1781 and first published in the same year.

== Structure ==
This violin sonata consists of two movements.

1. Adagio (G major) - Allegro (G minor)
2. Theme: Andantino cantabile, with variations:
  - Variation 1 (piano without violin)
  - Variation 2
  - Variation 3
  - Variation 4 in G minor
  - Variation 5: Adagio
  - Allegretto (Thema da capo – Coda)

== Discography ==
- Oleg Kagan, violin and Sviatoslav Richter, piano: Violin Sonata in G, K. 379 (1982)
- Arthur Grumiaux, violin and Walter Klien, piano: Violin Sonata in G K379 (1982)
- Augustin Dumay, violin and Maria João Pires, piano: Violin sonatas K. 301, No. 18, K. 304, No. 21, K. 378, No. 26 and K. 379, No. 27 (1991)
- Midori Seiler, violin and Jos Van Immerseel, fortepiano: Violin Sonata in G, K. 379 (2000)
- Vineta Sareika, violin and Amandine Savary, piano: Violin sonatas K. 376, No. 24, K. 379, No. 27 and K. 526, No. 35 (2019)
