= EUCO =

EUCO may be:

- European Council
- European Union Chamber Orchestra
