= Violin Sonata No. 32 (Mozart) =

- by W. A. Mozart
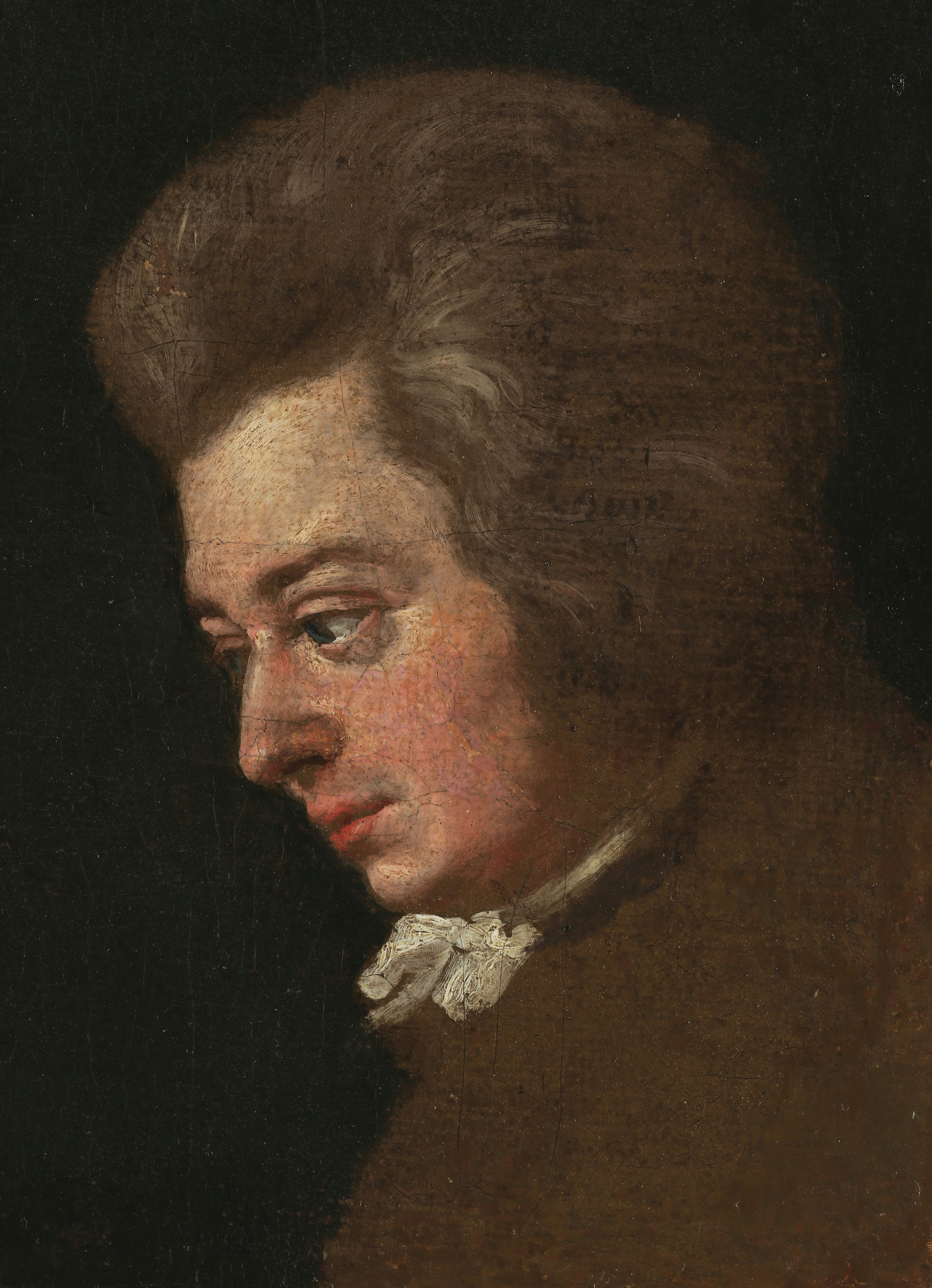
- Detail of Lange's 1782–83 Mozart portrait
- Key: B♭ major
- Catalogue: K. 454
- Commissioned by: Regina Strinasacchi
- Composed: Vienna, April 1784
- Published: Vienna, 1784
- Publisher: Christoph Torricella
- Duration: c. 22 minutes
- Movements: 3
- Scoring: Violin and piano

Premiere
- Date: 29 April 1784
- Location: Kärntnerthor Theater, Vienna
- Performers: Regina Strinasacchi, Wolfgang Amadeus Mozart

Violin Sonata No. 32 in B♭ major (K. 454) is a composition by Wolfgang Amadeus Mozart. It was completed in Vienna on 21 April 1784, and was published by Christoph Torricella in a group of three sonatas (together with the piano sonatas K. 284 and K. 333).

The sonata was written for a violin virtuoso Regina Strinasacchi of Mantua to be performed by them together at a concert in the Kärntnerthor Theater in Vienna on 29 April 1784. Although Mozart had the piano part securely in his head, he did not give himself enough time to write it out, and thus it was performed with a sheet of blank music paper in front of him in order to fool the audience. According to a story told by his widow Constanze Mozart, the Emperor Joseph II saw the empty sheet music through his opera glasses and sent for the composer with his manuscript, at which time Mozart had to confess the truth, although that is likely to have amazed the monarch rather than cause his irritation.

The work consists of three movements:

1. Largo – Allegro
2. Andante
3. Allegretto

The sonata opens with an exceptionally slow introduction, in which emphasis is put on the equality of the two instruments, kept throughout the entire work. The opening theme was later echoed by Haydn Op. 50 No. 1 String Quartet and Beethoven's String Quartet No. 1. The second movement has a melodic feeling of adagio, which was the tempo written down by Mozart at first, but then crossed out and marked Andante. In the development section there are bold chromatic modulations. The final movement returns to the playful mood of the first, but even so happens to be a very sophisticated Rondo.

The autograph is located in the archive of Stiftelsen Musikkulturens Främjande (The Nydahl Collection) in Stockholm.

== Recordings ==
- 1955 - David Oistrakh (violin), Vladimir Yampolsky (piano) - EMI - Warner classics)
- 1956 – Arthur Grumiaux (violin), Clara Haskil (piano) – Philips
- 1981 – Arthur Grumiaux (violin), Walter Klien (piano) – Philips
