= Violin Sonata No. 17 (Mozart) =

1781 composition by Mozart

- by W. A. Mozart
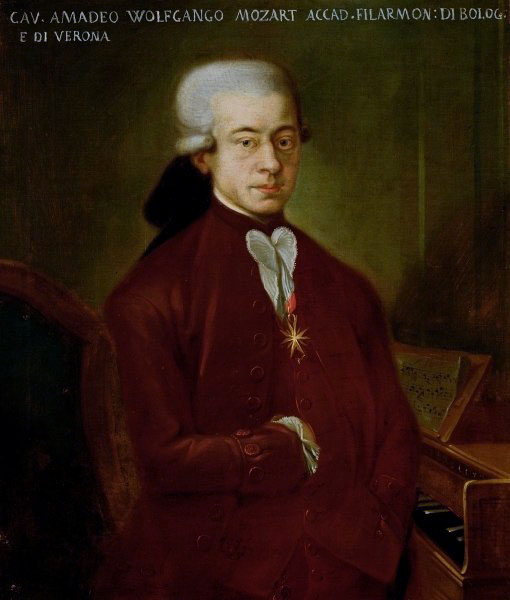
- 1777 Bologna portrait of Mozart
- Key: C major
- Catalogue: K. 296
- Composed: Mannheim, 11 March 1778
- Dedication: Josepha Barbara Auernhammer
- Published: 1781
- Duration: c. 17 minutes
- Movements: 3
- Scoring: Violin and piano

Violin Sonata No. 17 in C Major, K. 296, was composed by Wolfgang Amadeus Mozart on 11 March 1778 in Mannheim, Germany and was first published in 1781 as part of Mozart's Opus 2 collection. It is the first work of his 'mature sonatas' (those not written in his childhood), which were written between 1778 and 1788. The work was dedicated to Josepha Barbara Auernhammer.

The work consists of three movements:

1. Allegro vivace
2. Andante sostenuto in F major
3. Allegro

This work is written in the style popular in Mannheim, as Mozart was impressed upon playing the violin sonatas of Joseph Schuster, noting that they were “very popular” in Mannheim.
