= Stadtbredimus Castle =

Building in Stadbredimus, Luxembourg

Coordinates: 49°33′50″N 6°22′5″E

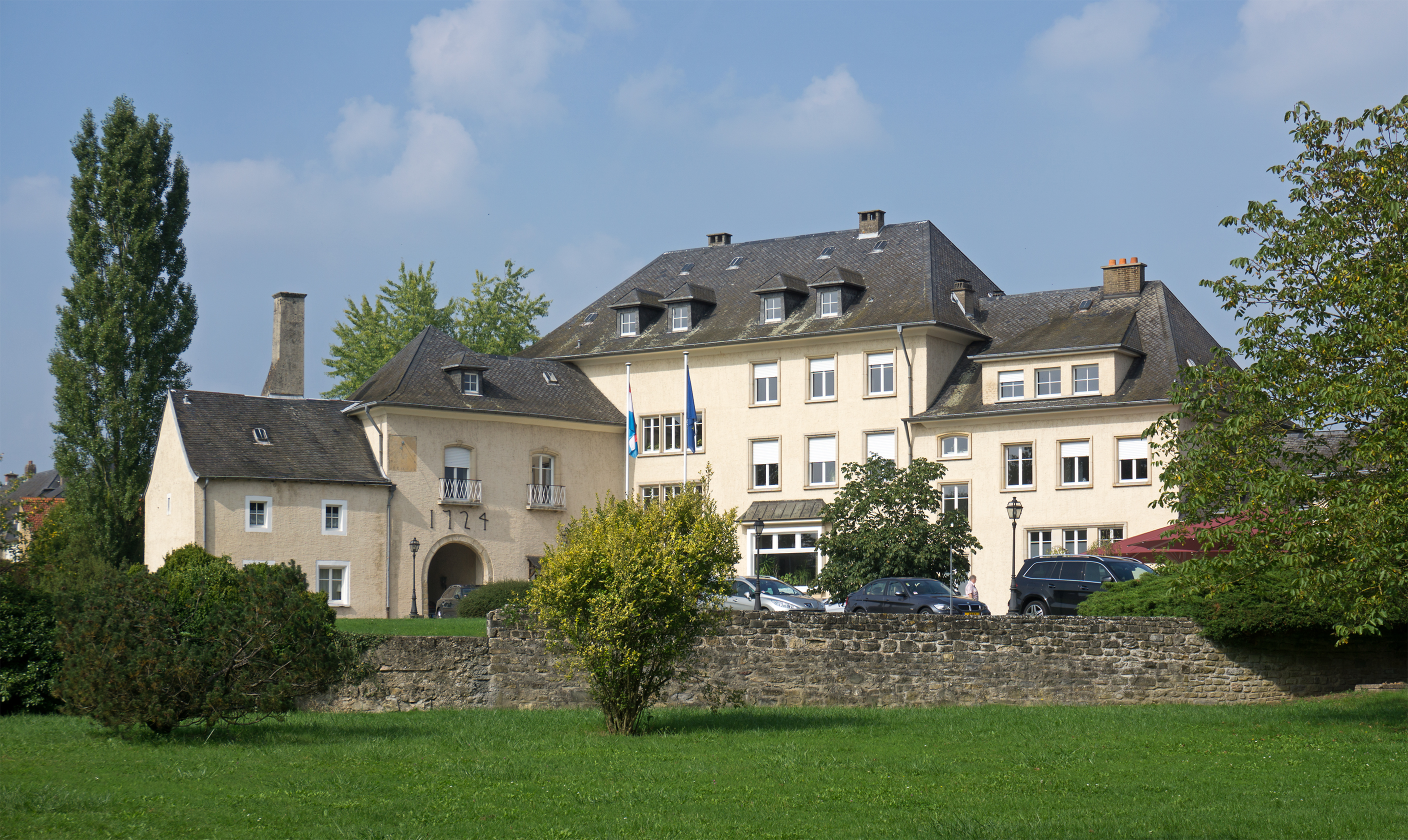
Stadtbredimus Castle

Stadtbredimus Castle (Luxembourgish: Schlass Stadbriedemes; French: Château de Stadtbredimus), located on the banks of the Moselle in the village of Stadtbredimus in south-eastern Luxembourg, has a history going back to the 13th century when a fortified castle stood on the site. In 1724, today's castle was built on the ruins of the old fort and, after some questionable restoration work, was bought by the la Fontaine family in 1802. It was here that Luxembourg's national poet, Edmond de la Fontaine, better known as Dicks, lived from 1858 to 1881.

The castle is now the headquarters of the Domaines Vinsmoselle wine cooperative.

== History ==
- 607 : Stadbredimus Castle is first mentioned in a document
- 792 : Owned by the abbey of Trier
- 893 : Owned by the abbey of Prüm
- 1294-1478: Owned by the lords of Bourscheid
- 1478-1616: Owned by the lords of Wiltz
- 1671-1699: Owned by Wolff Heinrich von Metternich Bourscheid.
- 1704: Freiherr Jakob von Bonylle (lord at Bubingen and canon of Worms) buys the castle from Metternich Bourscheid's descendants
- 1708: The bailiff Dominik Schoultgen buys the castle
- 1724: Dominik Schoultgen rebuilds the castle. From then on it remains unchanged until 1957.
- 1758: Ownership is transferred to Jean Vesque
- 1750-1760: The abbey of Prüm manages to buy back some of its former property. The abbey divides the Primerbierg (German: Primerberg = Prümerberg) amongst the inhabitants, with the condition that they have to cultivate it and pay rent every year. Even today the Primerbierg is one of the best wine-growing areas of the Luxembourgish Moselle
- 1769: Baron Johann Franz von Marschall buys the castle. The following were his guests from 19 to 29 August 1792: King Louis XVI's brothers, the counts of Provence and of Artois, the future kings Louis XVIII and Charles X, and the writer François-René de Chateaubriand.
- 1802 : The de la Fontaine family becomes the owner
- 1858-1881: Dicks inherits the castle from his aunt Françoise de la Fontaine, and lives there with his wife Pauline Dutreux.
- 1884-1890: The lawyer and author Alexis Brasseur lives in the castle
- 1920s: The Reichling family buys the castle.
- 1957: The bailiff Pierre Uhres, of Miersch, buys the castle and has it renovated: a second storey is added to the living quarters, and the wing is re-built.
- 1971: The wine company "Domaines de Vinsmoselle" buys the castle and establishes their headquarters there, which is opened in 1978. In a side building, they open the restaurant "An der Tourelle".
