= Plympton (disambiguation) =

Plympton is a town in Devon, England.

It may also refer to:

== Place names ==
- Plympton, Massachusetts, a town in the United States
- Plympton, Nova Scotia, Canada
- Plympton Station, Nova Scotia, Canada
- Plympton, a former township, now part of Plympton–Wyoming, Ontario, Canada
- Plympton, South Australia, a suburb of the city of Adelaide, South Australia
- Plympton, an area of East Fremantle, Western Australia

== People ==
- Bill Plympton, the animator of Plymptoons
- John Plympton, English Member of Parliament

== Companies ==
- Plympton, Inc., a literary studio

== See also ==
- Plimpton (disambiguation)
