= Amandine Savary =

French pianist (born 1984)

- Born: 20 February 1984 (age 41); Paris, France
- Genres: Classical, Contemporary music
- Occupation: Pianist
- Instrument: Piano

Amandine Savary is a French pianist born in February 1984 in Bayeux, Calvados.

== Biography ==
Amandine Savary began with her piano studies at the conservatory in Caen where she graduated with honours. In 2003 she joined the Royal Academy of Music of London to study under Professor Christopher Elton and Alexandre Satz. She obtained her master's degree with distinction.

In Great Britain, she was a laureate of the Tillet Trust Young Artists' Platform Scheme 2006, of the Kirckman Concert Society 2008 Scheme, of the Philip and Dorothy Green Award for Young Artists Concert Series 2008, and of the Park Lane Group Young Artists Series 2008. She also took part in the Holland Music Sessions 2007 as a « New Master on Tour 2008-2009 ».

In 2006, she co-founded Trio Dali with Vineta Sareika and Christian-Pierre La Marca. It won international awards in competitions in Osaka, Frankfurt (1st prizes) and New York (2nd prize).,

The Trio's first records dedicated to Ravel for the Fuga Libera – Outhere label received international critical acclaim (Diapason d’or, « 10 » of Classica, Disque du mois, Clef of ResMusica, « Choc de l’année » Classica 2009, Esceptional of Scherzo...). A second record dedicated to Schubert, (May 2011) under the same music label also garnered praise (« 5 » of Diapason, « 4 » de Classica, « Coup de Cœur » Fnac, « Choix » of Qobuz, « ƒƒƒ » of Télérama, Editor's Choice of Gramophone).

Savary has also recorded the Toccatas of Bach, as well as the Impromptus of Schubert.

Amandine Savary is an associate piano professor and an ensemble coach of the Royal Academy of Music.

In September 2019, she founded the Salieca Trio with Jack Liebeck (violin) et Thomas Carroll (cello).

She has performed on stage with musicians such as Alfred Brendel, Augustin Dumay, Tsuyoshi Tsutsumi, Lawrence Power, Paul Neubauer, Michel Portal.

Savary has worked with orchestras including the London Mozart Players, London Pro Orchestra, European Union Chamber Orchestra, Orchestre de Bretagne, Orchestre National de Lille, Orchestre Royal de Chambre de Wallonie, Philharmonia Orchestra, Sinfonia Varsovia, Latvian National Symphony Orchestra, Orchestre Philharmonique du Luxembourg, under conductors Moshe Atzmon, Hilary Devan Watton, Murray Stewart, Augustin Dumay, Jean-Claude Casadesus, Gérard Korsten, Pascal Rophé, Emmanuel Krivine.

== Discography ==
Amandine Savary has recorded for the record labels Fuga Libera, Sony, Zig-Zag Territoires and lately for Muso.

=== Soloist ===
- Bach, Toccatas, BWV 910-916 (2-4 April 2013, Muso MU-007) OCLC 894919178
- Schubert, Impromptus (June 2016, Muso MU-015)

=== Chamber music ===
- Ravel, Trio avec piano; Sonates for violine and piano - Trio Dali : Vineta Sareika, violine; Christian-Pierre La Marca, cello; Amandine Savary, piano (July 2008, Fuga Libera FUG547) OCLC 609982032
- Schubert, Trios with piano nos 1 and 2, Sonate « Arpeggione » D 821, Fantaisie, D 934, for violine and cello - Trio Dali : Jack Liebeck, violine; Christian-Pierre La Marca, cello; Amandine Savary, piano (January/February 2011, Fuga Libera FUG584) OCLC 868021109
- L'heure Exquise : Arrangements of French melodies of Charles Gounod, Claude Debussy, Reynaldo Hahn, Gabriel Fauré, Joseph Kosma, etc. - Christian-Pierre La Marca, cello; Patricia Petibon, soprano; Amandine Savary, piano (2011, Sony 88697881592) OCLC 762860560
- Mendelssohn, Trios with piano nos 1 et 2; Bach, Préludes de choral, BWV 639 (arr. violine and piano) et 659 (arr. cello and piano) - Trio Dali : Jack Liebeck, violine; Christian-Pierre La Marca, cello; Amandine Savary, piano (19-22 January 2015, Zig-Zag Territoires ZZT364) OCLC 911356987
- Grieg, Sonates for violine nos 1, 2 et 3 - Vineta Sareika, violine; Amandine Savary, piano (14-17 August 2017, Muso MU-024),
- Mozart, Piano and Violin Sonata nos 24, 27 and 35 - Vineta Sareika, violine; Amandine Savary, piano (28-30 July 2019, Muso MU-041)
