= Edmond de la Fontaine =

Luxembourgish writer and national poet (1823–1891)

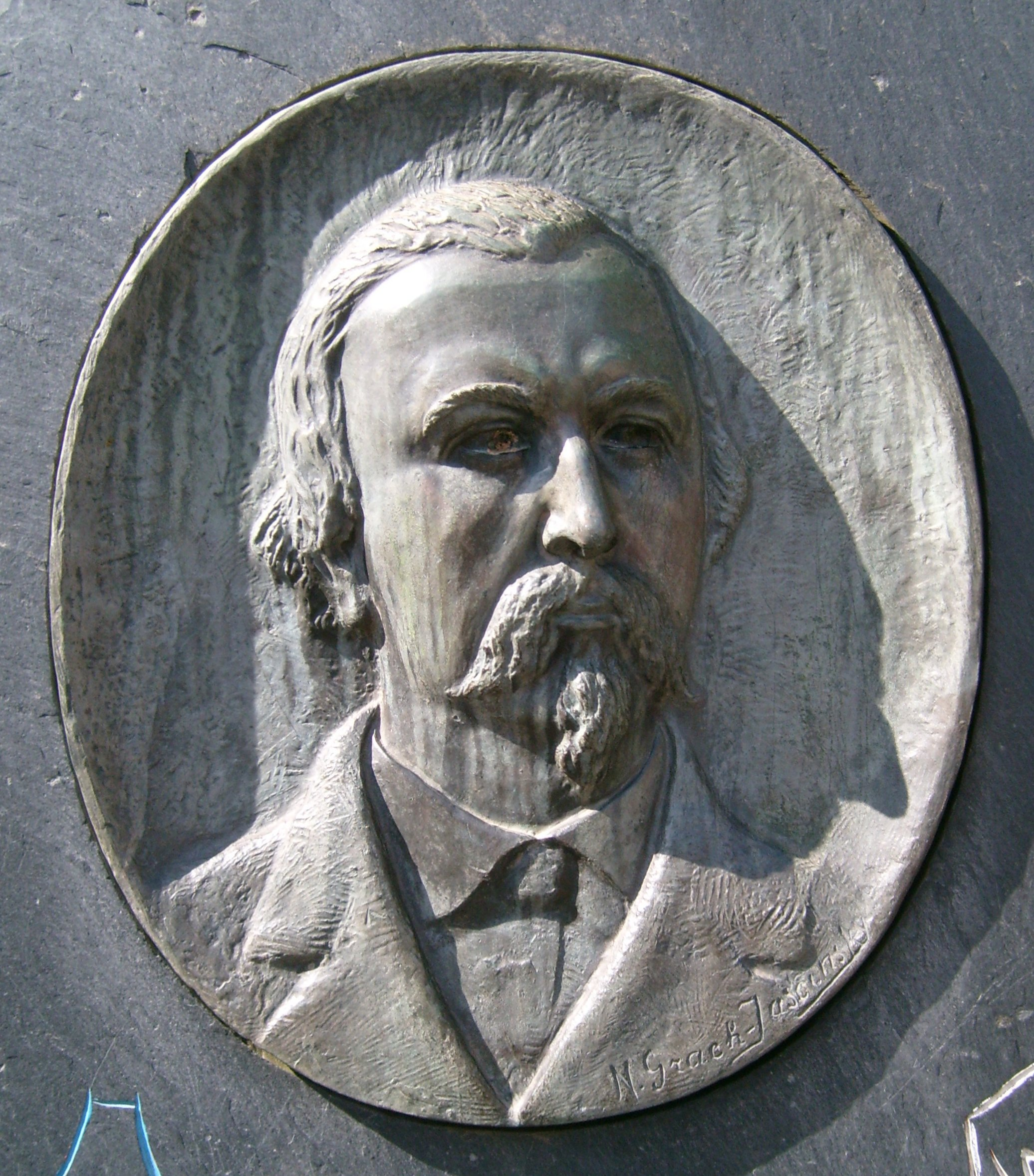
Medaillon of Monument dedicated to Edmond de la Fontaine (alias Dicks) by Nina Grach-Jascinsky (1966), place named "Dicksgärtchen", Vianden, Luxembourg

Edmond de la Fontaine (24 July 1823 – 24 June 1891), better known by his pen name of Dicks, was a Luxembourgish jurist, poet, and lyricist, known for his work in the Luxembourgish language. He is considered the national poet of Luxembourg and, along with Michel Lentz and Michel Rodange, one of the most important figures in the history of Luxembourgish literature. In addition, his Luxemburger Sitten und Bräuche was one of the most influential early ethnographies on the Luxembourgish people.

Fontaine was the third son of Gaspard-Théodore-Ignace de la Fontaine, who was appointed Governor of Luxembourg in 1841, and subsequently served as the country's first Prime Minister in 1848. Fontaine studied law at Liège, and spent a further year at Heidelberg pursuing Germanic studies from 1844 until 1847, before becoming a lawyer in 1850. Fontaine was not a skilled speaker, and this may be the reason why he later left the bar and became a deputy judge, then worked as an office manager for the railways. In 1858, he opened a weaving business, employing 60 workers in Remich. From 1867 until 1870, he served as mayor of Stadtbredimus, in eastern Luxembourg's Moselle Valley, and served as a Justice of the Peace in Vianden from 1881 and 1889. He lived in Stadtbredimus Castle from 1858 to 1881 where he would live for the last decade of his life.

== Works ==
=== Lyrics ===
- Liss, du bass mäi Caprice
- Den Hexemeeschter

=== Operettas ===
- D'Mumm Sěs (1855)

=== Poetry ===
- D’Vulleparlament am Grengewald 1848

=== Plays ===
- De Wëllefchen a de Fiischen
- D'Vulleparlament am Gréngewald
- Am Wanter
- Komeidisteck

=== Ethnography ===
- Luxemburger Sitten und Bräuche, Luxembourg: Brück 1883 (in German)
- Die luxemburger Kinderreime, Luxembourg: Bück 1877

== Legacy ==
- The Dicks-Lentz Monument at the west end of Place d'Armes in Luxembourg City was built in 1903 to honor Dicks and Michel Lentz.
