= Stadtbredimus =

Stadtbredimus Stadbriedemes
- Commune
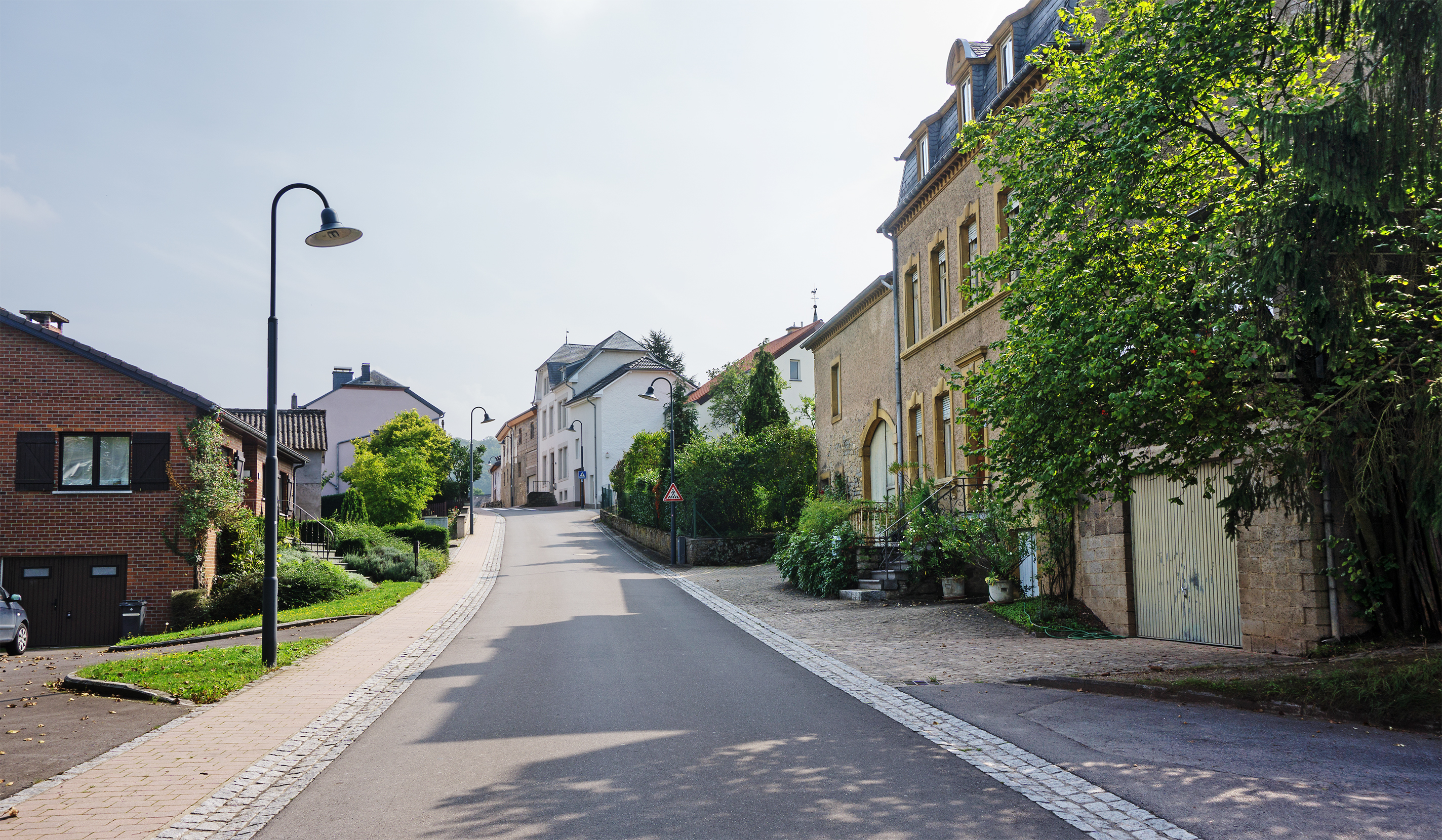

- Coat of arms

- Map of Luxembourg with Stadtbredimus highlighted in orange, and the canton in dark red
- Coordinates: 49.5639°N 6.3639°E
- Country: Luxembourg
- Canton: Remich

Government
  - Mayor: Robert Beissel

Area
  - Total: 10.17 km^{2} (3.93 sq mi)
  - Rank: 95th of 100
- Highest elevation: 289 m (948 ft)
  - Rank: 101st of 100
- Lowest elevation: 140 m (460 ft)
  - Rank: 4th of 100

Population (2026)
  - Total: 2,005
  - Rank: 83rd of 100
  - Density: 197.1/km^{2} (510.6/sq mi)
  - Rank: 45th of 100
- Time zone: UTC+1 (CET)
  - Summer (DST): UTC+2 (CEST)
- LAU 2: LU0001207
- Website: stadtbredimus.lu

Stadtbredimus (Luxembourgish: Stadbriedemes) is a commune and small town in south-eastern Luxembourg. It is part of the canton of Remich.

As of September 2026, the town of Stadtbredimus, which lies in the south-east of the commune, has a population of 959. Other towns within the commune include Greiveldange.

Stadtbredimus Castle in the centre of the town has a history going back to the 13th century when a fortified castle stood on the site. In 1724, today's castle was built on the ruins of the old fort. It was here that Luxembourg's national poet, Edmond de la Fontaine, better known as Dicks, lived from 1858 to 1881.

== Population ==
Historical population

Year	Pop.	±%
1821	961	—
1851	1,244	+29.4%
1900	1,004	−19.3%
1910	941	−6.3%
1922	849	−9.8%
1935	788	−7.2%

Year	Pop.	±%
1947	724	−8.1%
1960	667	−7.9%
1970	652	−2.2%
1981	754	+15.6%
1990	857	+13.7%
2000	1,274	+48.7%

Year	Pop.	±%
2005	1,296	+1.7%
2010	1,466	+13.1%
2015	1,674	+14.2%
2020	1,947	+16.3%
2021	1,968	+1.1%

Source data
