= Greiveldange =

Community in Luxembourg

Coordinates: 49°35′N 6°22′E

Greiveldange (Luxembourgish: Greiweldeng, German: Greiweldingen) is a small town in the commune of Stadtbredimus, in south-eastern Luxembourg. As of September 2026, the town has a population of 953.
