= Violin Sonata No. 33 (Mozart) =

- by W. A. Mozart
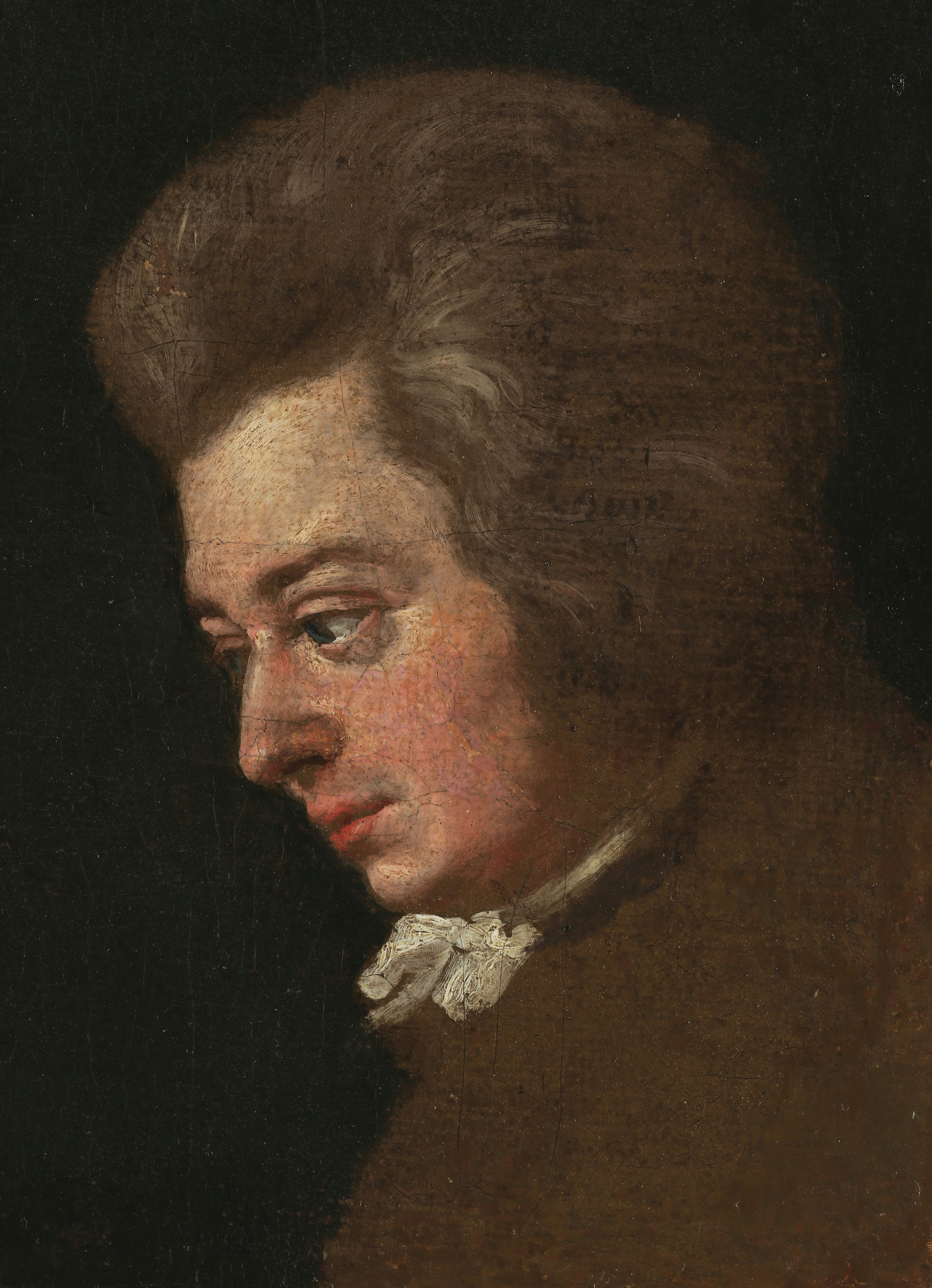
- Detail of Lange's 1782–83 Mozart portrait
- Key: E♭ major
- Catalogue: K. 481
- Composed: Vienna, before December 1785
- Published: 1785/86
- Publisher: Franz Anton Hoffmeister
- Duration: c. 25 minutes
- Movements: 3
- Scoring: Violin and piano

Violin Sonata No. 33 in E♭ major (K. 481) was composed by Wolfgang Amadeus Mozart in Vienna and listed in his personal catalogues of his works on 12 December 1785. It was published on its own by Franz Anton Hoffmeister, a German composer and music publisher to whom Mozart's String Quartet No. 20 (K. 499) is dedicated. The musicologist Marius Flothuis states that although much is unknown about the history of this sonata, it is certainly "one of the most mature works in Mozart's whole chamber output". Carl Friedrich Cramer in a 1783 review of this and Mozart's other mature piano and violin sonatas praised the style of composing for instruments in a democratic manner, fitting for the style, requiring skill and talent of both instrumentalists. Indeed, Manafu rates these sonatas as of crucial importance in the development of the genre.

== Structure ==
The work consists of three movements:

1. Molto allegro
2. Adagio
3. Allegretto

Each of the three movements has its own distinct structure: the first movement is in sonata form (although with three clear subjects in the exposition as opposed to the standard two). Furthermore, the development section is based on none of these three subjects, but on a four-note motif that would become the theme for the last movement of the Jupiter Symphony (Nº 41). This motif makes a final appearance at the end of the movement, after the expected coda. Simon Keefe calls attention to the equal partnership between piano and violin in presenting the main theme as well as later thematic material during the recapitulation section.

The second movement is a rondo in the key of A♭ which modulates enharmonically to the remote keys of C♯ minor and A major.

The finale is a set of six variations based on a theme which is twenty measures in length. The piano part shows some virtuosity in the writing, for the left hand in the third variation and for both hands in the fifth. The last variation sets the theme in a gigue-like rhythm. It is virtuosic as well in the violin part, using scalar passages to highten the excitement.
