= Sonata for Two Pianos (Mozart) =

1781 work composed by Wolfgang Amadeus Mozart

- by W. A. Mozart
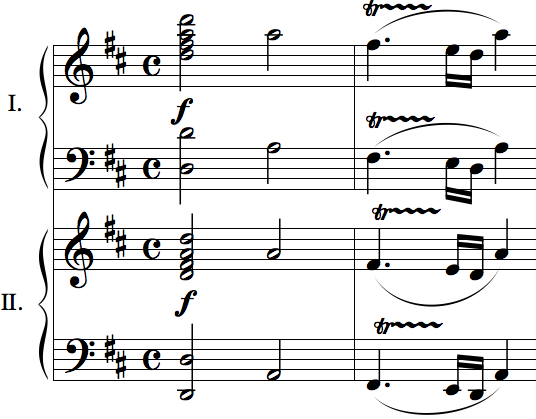
- Beginning of the sonata
- Key: D major
- Catalogue: K. 448 (375a)
- Style: Classical period
- Composed: 1781
- Movements: Three (Allegro con spirito, Andante, Molto allegro)

The Sonata for Two Pianos in D major, K. 448 (375a), is a work composed by Wolfgang Amadeus Mozart in 1781, when he was 25. It is written in sonata-allegro form, with three movements. The sonata was composed for a performance he gave with fellow pianist Josepha Auernhammer. He also performed the sonata in concert in June 1784 with Maria Anna Barbara von Ployer, an accomplished pianist for whom he composed two piano concertos (No. 14, K. 449, and No. 17, K. 453).

Mozart composed this work in the galant style, with interlocking melodies and simultaneous cadences. This is one of his few compositions written for two pianos – the others are the concerto for two pianos, K. 365, and the Fugue in C minor, K. 426, which Mozart later arranged for string quartet with an added introductory adagio.

The autograph manuscript of the sonata is preserved in Veste Coburg, Germany.

== Description ==
Sonata for Two Pianos
Amateur recording of the first movement

The sonata is written in three movements:

1. Allegro con spirito, in D major and common time
2. Andante, in G major and triple time
3. Molto allegro, in D major and duple time

The first movement sets the tonal center with a strong introduction. The two pianos divide the main melody for the exposition, and when the theme is presented, both play it simultaneously. Little time is spent in the development section; a new theme is introduced (unlike most sonata forms) before the recapitulation, repeating the first theme.

The second movement is written in A–B–A form.

The third movement begins with a galloping theme. The cadences used in this movement are similar to those in Mozart's Rondo alla Turca.

== Effects on the brain ==
Mozart's K. 448 was the composition used in the original study that led to the theory of the so-called Mozart effect, which posited that listening to the piano sonata improved spatial reasoning skills, later widened in pop-science to an increase in IQ in general.

A 2025 research discovered, using Quantitative electroencephalography, that listening to K. 448 enhances verbal working memory performance.

== Recordings ==
Recordings on historical keyboards include:

- Nadine Palmier, Joel Rigal. Mozart. Mozart à Versailles: Intégrale de l'oeuvre pour deux claviers. Label: Arion, 1986. Fortepianos by Pascal Taskin from 1788 and 1790.
- Malcolm Frager, Robert Levin. Mozart. Works for Two Claviers. Label: ORF, 1991. Fortepianos by Anton Walter from c. 1780 (Mozart's own) and c. 1790.
- Bart van Oort, Ursula Dütschler. Mozart. Label: Brilliant Classics, 2001. Fortepianos by Chris Maene (Ruiselede, 2000) after Walter (c. 1795) and Thomas & Barbara Wolf (1983) after Johann Schanz.
- Wolfgang Brunner, Leonore von Stauss. Mozart. Label: Hänssler, 2003. Fortepianos by Robert A. Brown (Oberndorf bei Salzburg, 1988) after Walter (c. 1790) and J.C. Neupert (Bamberg, c. 1980) after J. J. Könnicke (c. 1790).
- Yoshio Watanabe, Akiko Sakikawa. Mozart. Label: ALM Records, 2004. Fortepianos by Ferdinand Hofmann (c. 1790-1795).
- Marie Kuijken, Veronica Kuijken. Mozart. Sonatas for Four Hands. Label: Challenge Classics, 2009. Fortepianos by Claude Kelecom after Johann Andreas Stein.
- Paul Badura-Skoda, Jörg Demus. Mozart. Label: Gramola, 2010. Fortepianos by Walter from c. 1790 and c. 1795.
- Alexei Lubimov, Yury Martynov. Mozart. Pieces for Two Fortepianos. Label: Zig-Zag Territoires, 2011. Fortepianos from c. 1785 and c. 1790.
- Artem Belogurov, Menno van Delft. Miscellanea. Label: TRPTK, 2019. Fortepiano by Johann Zahler (c. 1805) and harpsichord by Jacob Kirkman (1766).
