= Ferdinand Hummel =

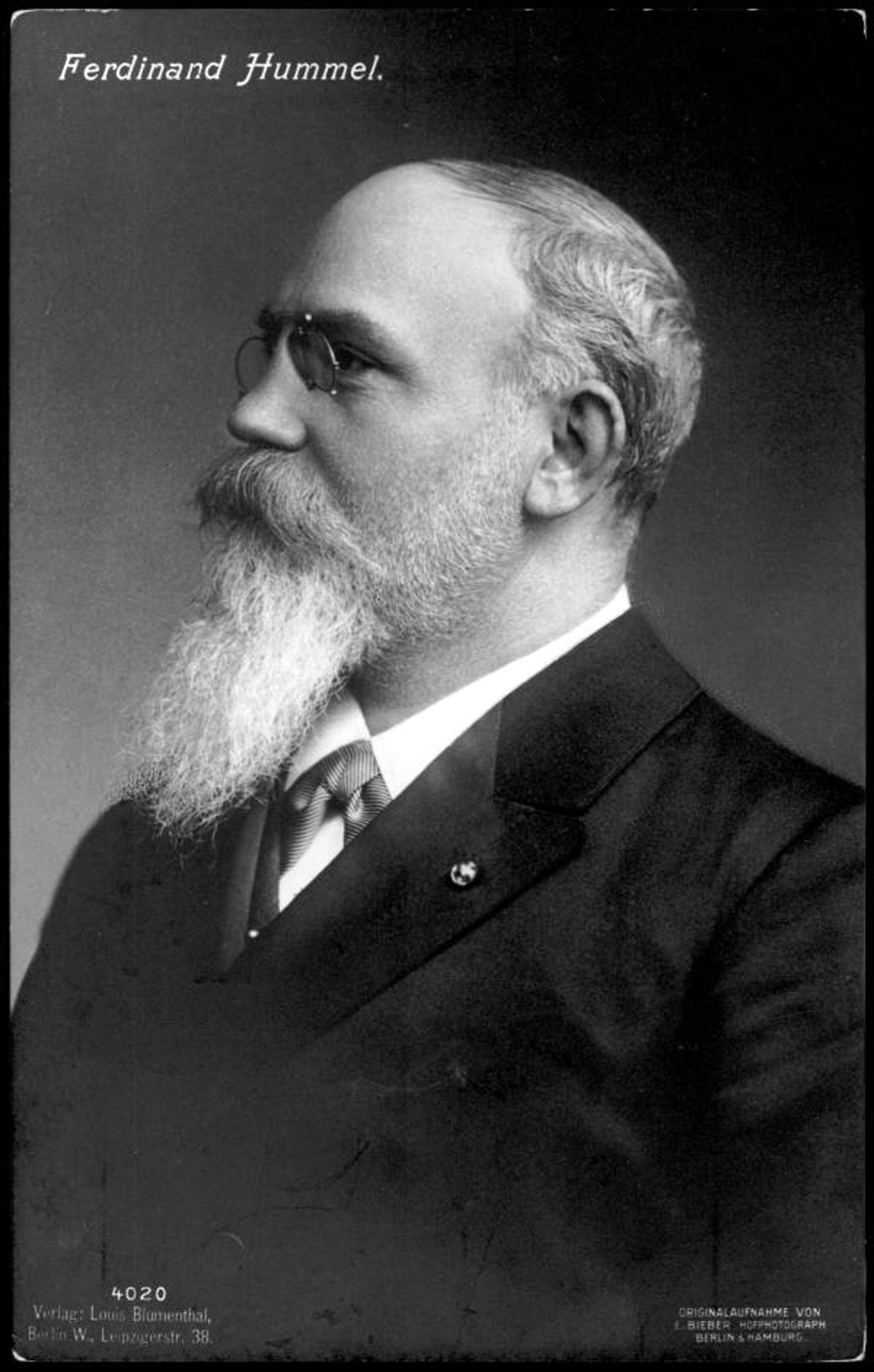
Ferdinand Hummel.

Ferdinand Hummel (September 6, 1855 in Berlin – April 24, 1928 in Berlin) was a German composer, harp player, pianist and conductor.

Hummel started as a child prodigy, and his father, who was a flute player in the Royal Orchestra in Berlin, took care of his son's first musical training instructing him in both the piano and the harp from the age of four (some say seven) gaining a King Wilhelm von Preussen Stipendium, so he could study with Antonio Zamara at the Gesellschaft der Musikfreunde in Vienna.

In the years 1864 to 1867, the boy toured with his father to South and North Germany, Denmark, Sweden, Norway and Russia, where he was hailed as a great harp virtuoso. Through a Royal grant, he later went to study at New Academy of Music, Berlin (Theodor Kullak's institute) from 1868 to 1875 and later at the Royal High School for Music and Composition with Woldemar Bargiel and Friedrich Kiel as his principal teachers.

After his education, he was a harp player in B. Bilse's Orchestra, which was later to become the Berlin Philharmonic Orchestra. In 1892, Hummel was appointed leader of the stage music at the Royal Theatre in Berlin, becoming director from 1897 to 1917.

As a composer, Hummel was very productive writing operas, chamber music, piano pieces and choral works. Today his music is mostly forgotten, but his operas are at least of some interest since they form a German equivalent to the Italian Verismo-style of Puccini, Mascagni and Leoncavallo.

His operas include: Mara op. 61 (1893), Angla op. 60 (1894), Ein treuer Schelm op. 64 (A faithful rogue) (1894), Assarpai op. 65 (1898), Sophie von Brabant (Sophie from Brabant) (1899). Die Beichte op. 69 (The Confession) (1900), Die Gefilde der Seligen (The Field of the Holy Ones) (1917) and Jenseits des Stroms (On the Other Side of the Stream) (1922).

He also composed music for the plays Das heilige Lachen (The Holy Laughing) and Sakuntala – both in 1903. He composed a symphony in D major op. 105, a piano concerto in B flat major op. 35, a piano quintet, a violin sonata, a horn sonata and other minor works.

He is not related to Johann Nepomuk Hummel (1778–1837).
