= Plimpton–Winter House =

Historic house in Massachusetts, United States

- Plimpton-Winter House
- U.S. National Register of Historic Places
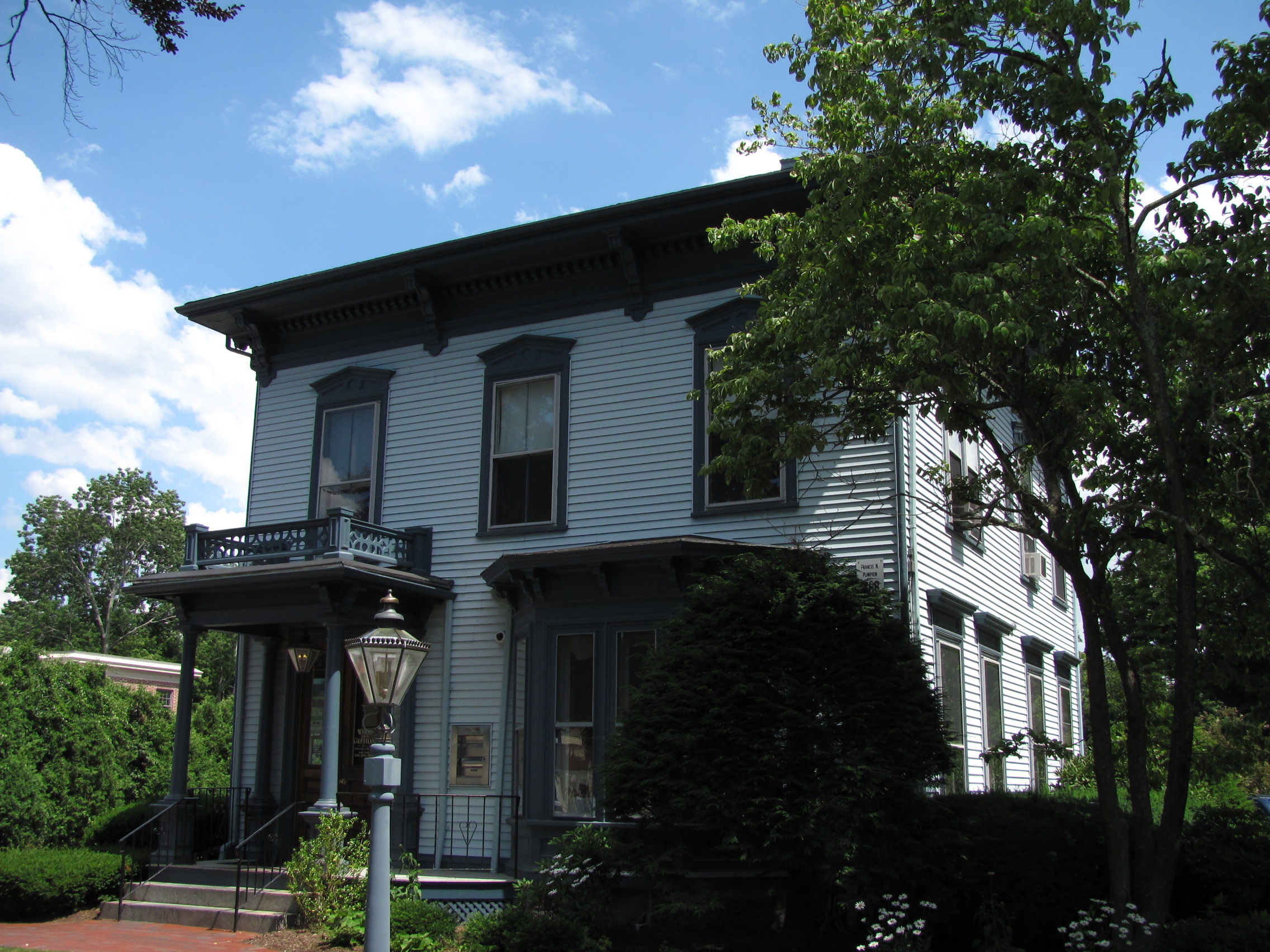
- Plimpton-Winter House

- Location within Massachusetts Location within the United States
- Location: 127 South Street, Wrentham, Massachusetts
- Coordinates: 42°3′53″N 71°19′50″W
- Built: 1868
- Architectural style: Italianate
- NRHP reference No.: 85003071
- Added to NRHP: December 5, 1985

The Plimpton–Winter House is a historic house in Wrentham, Massachusetts. This two-story wood-frame house, built in 1868, is Wrentham's finest Italianate house. It has the boxy shape and low hip roof with bracketed eave, elements that are typical of the style, along with a front entry porch with bracketed cornice and balustrade above. Its first owner, Francis Plimpton, was president of the First National Bank of Wrentham for forty years, and its second owner, Murray Winter, was co-owner of a local factory.

The house was listed on the National Register of Historic Places in 1985.

== See also ==
- National Register of Historic Places listings in Norfolk County, Massachusetts
