= European Union Chamber Orchestra =

The European Union Chamber Orchestra (EUCO) is a chamber orchestra with funding from the European Commission, founded in 1981 and initially known as the European Community Chamber Orchestra.

The orchestra has toured worldwide and broadcast on BBC Radio 3. It has performed with at that time debuting Peter Donohoe, Nikolai Demidenko, Amandine Savary, Sheku Kanneh-Mason, and Tasmin Little. The orchestra has produced 18 CDs.

== See also ==
- Chamber Orchestra of Europe
- European Union Baroque Orchestra
- European Union Youth Orchestra
