= D'Mumm Sěs =

1856 opera by Dicks (Edmond de la Fontaine)

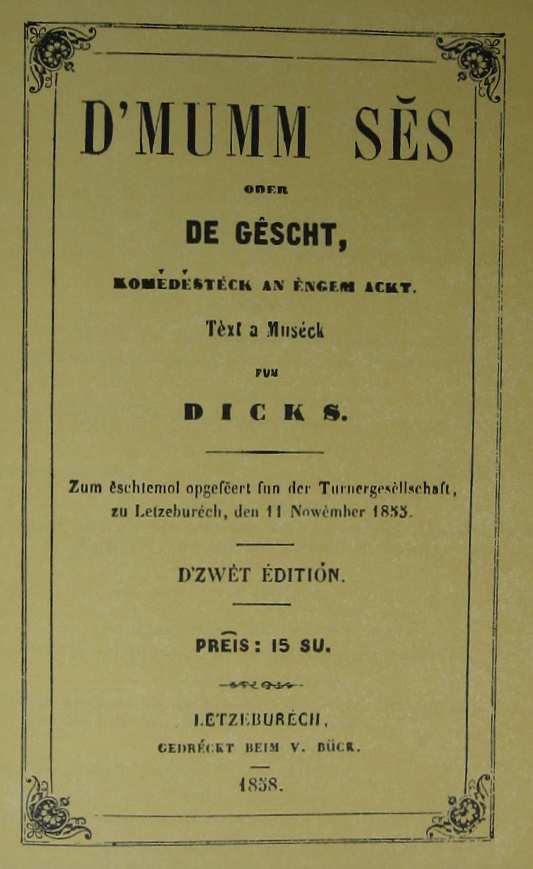
Title page from the second edition of D'Mumm Sěs, 1858.

D'Mumm Séis oder De Geescht (originally "D'Mumm Sěs oder De Gêscht"; English: Mother Séis, or the Ghost) is a comedic operetta in one act by the Luxembourgish poet Dicks (Edmond de la Fontaine, 1823–1891).

The operetta was written in August 1855 at the Hotel Grand-Chef in Mondorf-les-Bains and published the following year. It was first performed by the Société de gymnastique (Gym) on 11 November 1855.

In the official catalogue of Dicks' works, D'Mumm Séis is numbered Opus 19.

The piece is one of the most well-known of Dicks' works, and was further published in German under the title Mutter Suse.

== Plot ==
Séis, a washerwoman from Clausen, has a niece named Kettéi. Kettéi is in love with Péiter, but Séis' neighbour, Sprochmates, wants to marry the girl off to his own son. Another neighbour, Hexentommes, has his eye on Séis' fortune and wants to marry the woman. To achieve this, he attempts to convince her that the ghost of her former lover, the cannoneer Gottlieb Hurra, haunts his house at night.

Hexentommes suggests to Séis that they drive away the ghost, and asks Sprochmates to play the role of Hurra's ghost. The latter initially agrees, but then becomes apprehensive about the scheme. Sprochmates exposes Hexentommes.

In the end, Kettéi and Péiter become a couple.

== Characters ==
- Mother Séis (D'Mumm Séis), a washerwoman
- Kettéi, Séis' niece
- Péiter, Kettéi's suitor
- Sprochmates, a neighbour of Séis
- Hexentommes, another neighbour of Séis
- The other neighbours
