= Piano Concerto No. 0 (Beethoven) =

Beethoven's first piano concerto

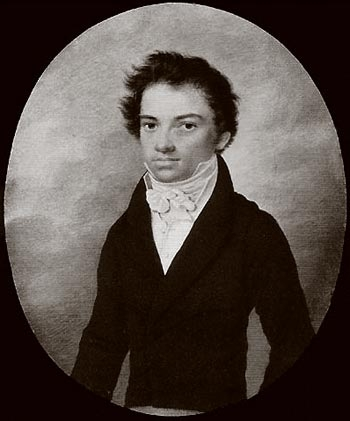
Beethoven in 1788.

Ludwig van Beethoven's Piano Concerto in E♭ major, WoO. 4, is one of his earlier works, written in 1784 when he was only 14. Only the solo piano part survives today, although there are some indications in the manuscript for orchestral cues. On the occasions when the work has been performed, the orchestral part has had to be arranged beforehand. The concerto is sometimes referred to as Piano Concerto No. 0, as it came before all of Beethoven's other piano concertos. It is rarely performed. Pianists Howard Shelley, Ronald Brautigam and Philippos Tsalachouris, and conductor Jon Ceander Mitchell as well as the Swiss musicologist and composer Willy Hess, have each made their own reconstructions of the concerto.

== Structure ==
The work is in three movements as follows:

1. Allegro moderato
2. Larghetto
3. Rondo allegretto

The fact that each performance has a different orchestration makes it difficult to describe the work accurately, but in general the concerto has the style of classical composers of the late 18th century such as Joseph Haydn, who would later come to tutor Beethoven.

The first movement has a piano part using mainly scale ideas at a moderately fast tempo. The slow second movement is similar in form, with common arpeggiation and ornamenting. The last movement has a jolly melody for the main theme, played very fast, again based on scales.

Beethoven most likely composed this concerto in 1784, when he was still in Bonn. During this time period, Mozart had not yet composed his Symphonies No. 39, 40, or 41. Beethoven went to Vienna in 1792 at the age of 21.
