= Josepha Barbara Auernhammer =

Austrian pianist and composer

- Born: 25 September 1758; Vienna, Austria
- Died: 30 January 1820 (aged 61); Vienna, Austrian Empire
- Occupations: Pianist, composer
- Spouse: Johann Bessenig (m. 1786)
- Children: 4

Josepha Barbara Auernhammer (25 September 1758 – 30 January 1820) was an Austrian pianist and composer.

== Biography ==
Auernhammer was born in Vienna, the eleventh of fifteen children born to Johann Michael Auernhammer and Elisabeth (nee Timmer). Of the fifteen children, only three lived past the age of thirty. Auernhammer studied with, among others, Leopold Anton Kozeluch, and Mozart, who dedicated a number of works to her and with whom she performed a number of works that required four hands.

On 27 June 1781, Mozart wrote of her: "Almost every day after dinner I am at H: v: Auernhammer's - The Miss is a monster! - plays delightfully though, however, she lacks the genuine fine and lilting quality of cantabile; she plucks too much." That year, Mozart dedicated his Violin Sonatas K. 296 and K. 376–80 to her.

Auernhammer became a much-admired concert pianist and teacher throughout Vienna. She corrected the printing of several sonatas by Mozart, and her piano playing together with Mozart was described enthusiastically by Abbé Stadler. During a house concert in Vienna Passauerhof on 23 November 1781, she played Mozart's Sonata for Two Pianos, K. 448 and the Double Concerto, K. 365. Further joint concert appearances took place in January 1782 and on 26 May 1782.

After the death of her father, Mozart conveyed a housing at Countess Waldstätten's to Auernhammer which was located in the Leopoldstadt district of Vienna. In 1786, she married Johann Bessenig (c. 1752 – 1837), with whom she had four children. She regularly participated in concerts in private venues and at the Burgtheater. Already on 25 March 1801, immediately after the work was finished, she played the Piano Concerto in C major, Op 15 by Ludwig van Beethoven.

Her last public concert was on 21 March 1813, together with her daughter, Marianna Auenheim, who was a known voice teacher and pianist. Auernhammer wrote predominantly piano music, and especially variations which are characterized by extensive knowledge of pianistic techniques and artful use of the instrument.

== Death ==
She died in Vienna, aged 61, in 1820. She was buried in St. Marx Cemetery.
