= Karl Keller =

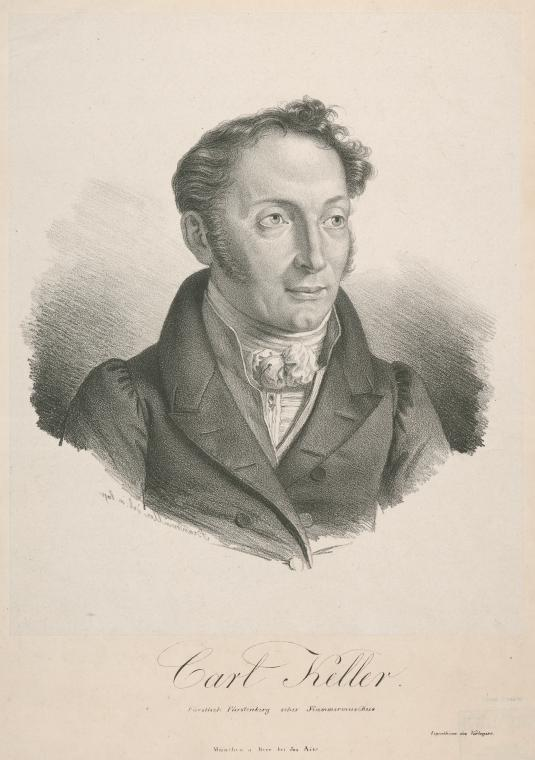
Portrait of Carl Keller, composer (1784-1855)

Karl Keller (German: [kaʁl ˈkɛlɐ]; 16 October 1784, Dessau – 19 July 1855, Schaffhausen) was a German flautist and composer. His name is sometimes rendered as Charles in English-speaking countries. Keller's works are mostly oriented towards the usage of flutes in a concert setting as well as a paucal number in guitar exists. Despite this, he was described in the 19th edition of the British music magazine, The Monthly Musical Record, as "[c]omposer of several pieces".

== Life ==
Keller was born to the musician, Johann Gotthilf Keller, who died at a very early age. His father's colleagues and friends later taught music while having an additional benefit of possessing a soprano voice that later became a baritone voice. As he grew up, he developed an interest in acting roles in theaters. This later encouraged conflicts between him and his father's music-oriented connections who were his music instructors. As this turn of event influenced him, he chose the flute as his primary musical instrument, in which he became an accomplished flautist after two years.

Under the encouragement of Johann Friedrich Reichardt, Keller later settled in Kassel under the patronage of Catharina of Württemberg as the first flautist of the court chapel and the instructor of singing and guitar with the monarch as her student for 7 years until the dissolution of Kingdom of Westphalia. He was a concert flautist for some time after leaving Kassel. Later, he was employed as a court musician for Prince Fürstenberg in Donaueschingen through the help of Conradin Kreutzer in 1817. His time in Donauschingen was also the moment of his life, in which he was married to the opera singer, Wilhelmine Meierhofer.

Keller settled in Schaffhausen after his retirement in 1849.
