= Job Plimpton =

American composer and organ builder

Job Plimpton born on February 27, 1784, and died in 1864, was one of the first American composers and an organ builder.

== Publications ==
- The Washington Choir (1843)
