= Violin Sonata No. 21 (Mozart) =

1778 composition by W. A. Mozart

- by W. A. Mozart
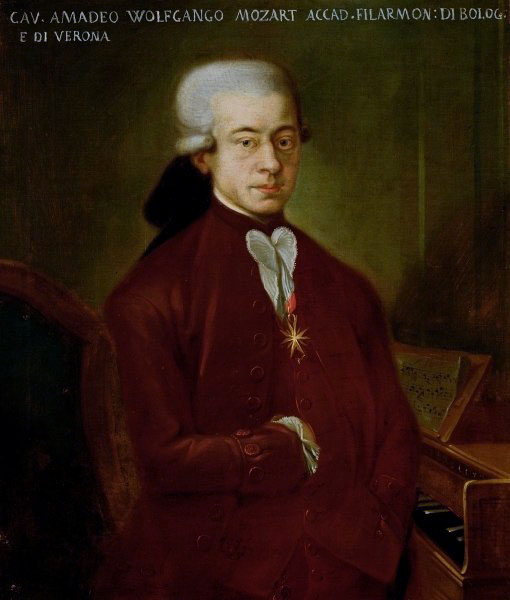
- 1777 Bologna portrait of Mozart
- Key: E minor
- Catalogue: K. 304/300c
- Composed: Paris, 1778
- Published: 1778
- Duration: c. 12 minutes
- Movements: 2
- Scoring: Violin and piano

Sonata for Piano and Violin No. 21 in E minor (K. 304/300c) is a work by Wolfgang Amadeus Mozart. It was composed in 1778 while Mozart was in Paris. The piece was composed during the same period that Mozart's mother, Anna Maria Mozart, died, and the sonata's mood reflects this. It is the only violin sonata by Mozart in a minor key.

1. Allegro (in E minor)
2. Tempo di Menuetto (in E minor)

Martin-Joseph Mengal arranged the two movements to wind quintet and incorporated them in his Quintetto tiré des œuvres de Mozart.

Violin Sonata K. 304 – 2. Tempo di Menuetto
Performed by Carrie Rehkopf (violin) with pianist
