= Regina Strinasacchi =

Italian musician (died 1839)

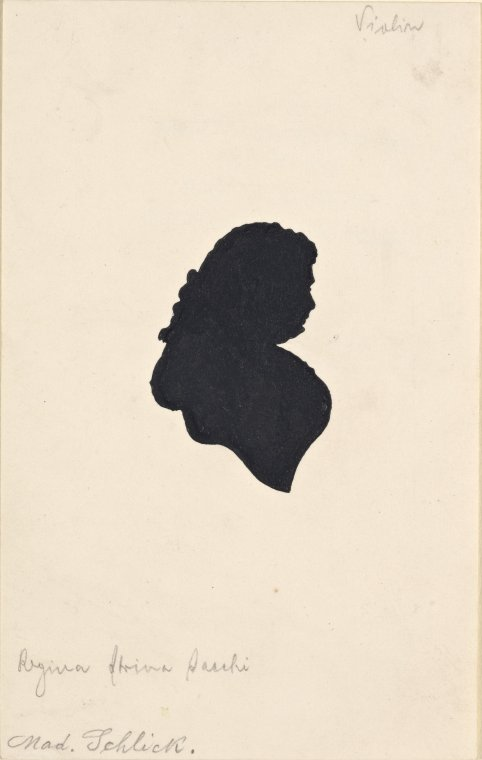
- Portrait of Regina Strinasacchi
- Born: 1761; Ostiglia, Italy
- Died: 11 June 1839 (aged 77–78); Dresden, Kingdom of Saxony
- Occupation: violinist

Regina Schlick née Strinasacchi (c. 1761 – 11 June 1839) was a violin virtuoso and guitarist in a time when women rarely performed on the violin in public. She knew Wolfgang Amadeus Mozart well enough that he composed the Sonata in B flat for Violin and Keyboard, "Strinasacchi," (K. 454) at her request.

Strinasacchi was born in either 1761, 1762 or 1764, at Ostiglia, near Mantua. In addition to her skill with the violin, she played guitar and composed, having studied at Vivaldi's school, the Ospedale della Pietà in Venice. She toured Italy, France and Germany between 1780 and 1783, arriving in Vienna in 1784, where she met Mozart. In a letter to his father, Mozart wrote: "We now have here the famous Strinasacchi from Mantua, a very good violinist. She has a great deal of taste and feeling in her playing. I am this moment composing a sonata which we are going to play together on Thursday at her concert in the theater." On 29 April 1784 she performed a concert with Mozart for Holy Roman Emperor Joseph II, where they debuted the sonata. Famously, Mozart performed his piano portion without sheet music.

In 1785, Strinasacchi married Johann Conrad Schlick (born Munster, Germany, 1759— died Gotha, 1825), composer, cellist, mandolinist and konzertmeister of the Gotha ducal band. He was already a professional musician when they married, playing at the Bishop's Chapel of Munster. They performed some concert tours together after their marriage, playing duos for violin and cello and mandolin and guitar. Their son, Johann Friedrich William Schlick, was born in 1801 and became a cellist and instrument maker. Upon her husband's death, she moved with her son to Dresden, where she lived out the remainder of her life. She was also reported to have died in Gotha.
