= Violin Sonata No. 18 (Mozart) =

- by W. A. Mozart
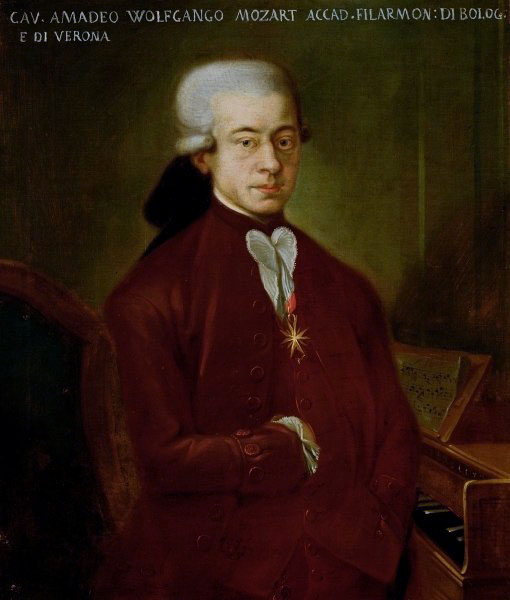
- 1777 Bologna portrait of Mozart
- Key: G major
- Catalogue: K. 301/293a
- Composed: Mannheim, March 1778
- Dedication: Countess Palatine Elisabeth Auguste of Sulzbach
- Published: 1778
- Duration: c. 14 minutes
- Movements: 2
- Scoring: Violin and piano

Violin Sonata No. 18 in G major (K. 301/293a) was composed by Wolfgang Amadeus Mozart in March 1778 in Mannheim, Germany, and was first published in the same year as part of Mozart's Opus 1 collection, which was dedicated to Countess Palatine Elisabeth Auguste of Sulzbach and are consequently known as the Palatine Sonatas (Kurfürstin Sonaten).

The work consists of two movements:

1. Allegro con spirito
2. Allegro

Trio in G Minor
