= Mozart symphonies of spurious or doubtful authenticity =

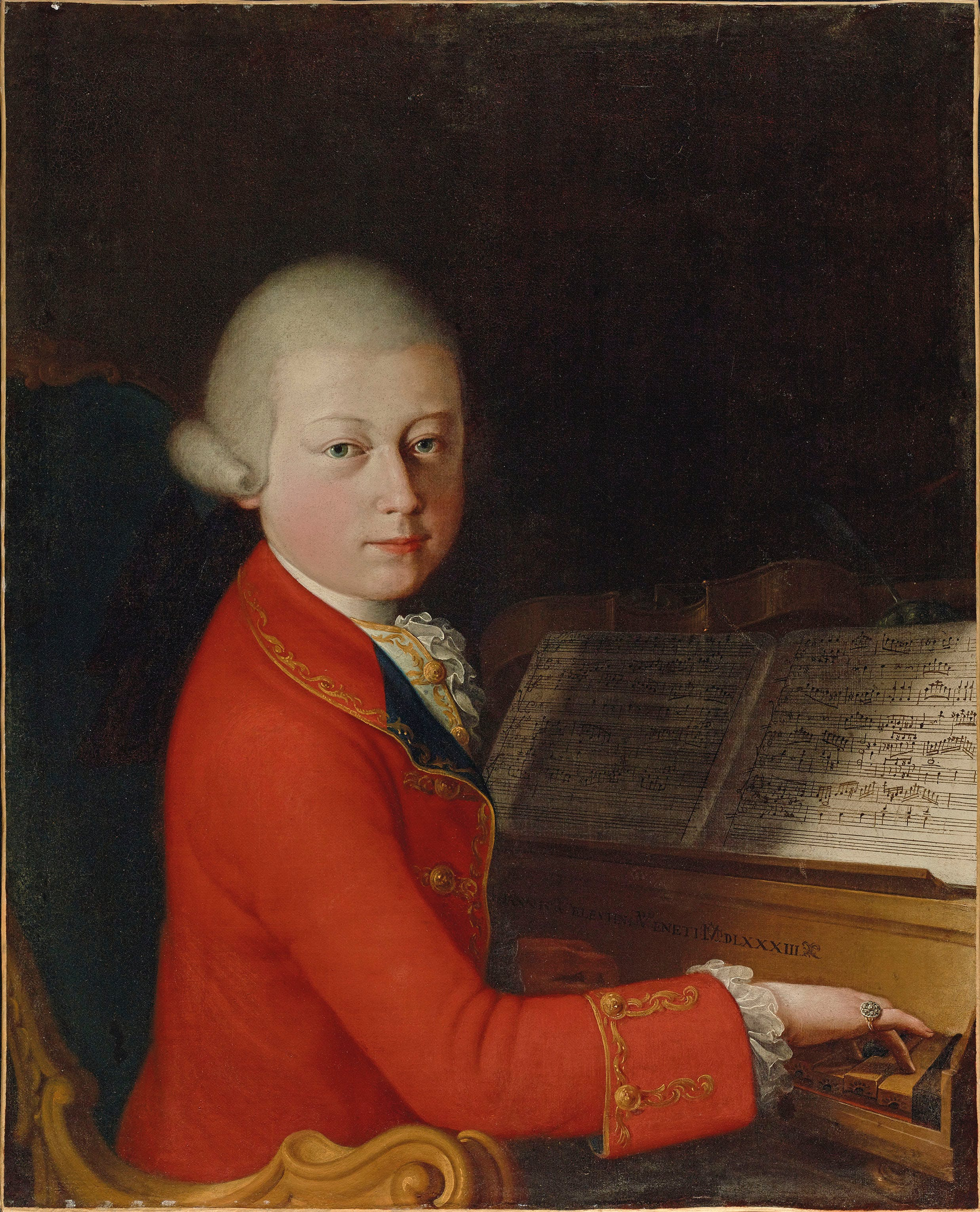
Mozart, pictured in 1770 aged 13

This list of Mozart symphonies of spurious or doubtful authenticity contains 39 symphonic works whose initial attribution to Wolfgang Amadeus Mozart has subsequently been proved spurious, or is the subject of continuing doubt. The number of symphonies actually written by Mozart is imprecisely known; of the 41 formally numbered, three (Nos. 2, 3 and 37) are established as by other composers and another, No. 11 (K. 84/73q), is considered by scholars to be of doubtful authenticity.

Outside the accepted sequence 1–41, however, there are around twenty other genuine Mozart symphonies, and beyond these, a larger number of problematic works which have not been authenticated as Mozart's. Some of these may be genuine; dubious works are often treated as authentic by the compilers of collected editions—eight (K. 76/42a in F major, K. Anh. 214/45b in B♭ major, K. 81/73l in D major, K. 97/73m in D major, K. 95/73n in D major, K. 84/73q in D major, K. 75 in F major, and K. 96/111b in C major) are in the main body of the 1991 Neue Mozart-Ausgabe (NMA: English New Mozart Edition), and another two (K. Anh. 220/16a/Anh.C 11.18 in A minor and K. Anh. 216/Anh.C 11.03/74g in B♭ major) are included in the supplementary 2000 volume of works of doubtful authenticity. Some, however, have long been accepted as the works of other composers, who in many instances have been positively identified.

Many of the authentication difficulties arise from early Mozart symphonies, where original autograph scores are missing. In some instances the main body of the work has been entirely lost, its identity being preserved only through an incipit (record of the opening few bars) cataloged by Breitkopf & Härtel, who published the Alte Mozart-Ausgabe (AMA) in 1883. The informal 18th century methods of publishing and distributing musical works caused additional confusion. Cataloging errors based on inadequate information, and an occasional over-eagerness to attribute new discoveries to Mozart has added to the problem. However, the "spurious and doubtful" list of symphonies is not fixed, as new evidence can sometimes lead to authentication; it can also throw doubt upon, or disqualify, symphonies once generally accepted as genuine Mozart.

== Reasons for misattribution ==
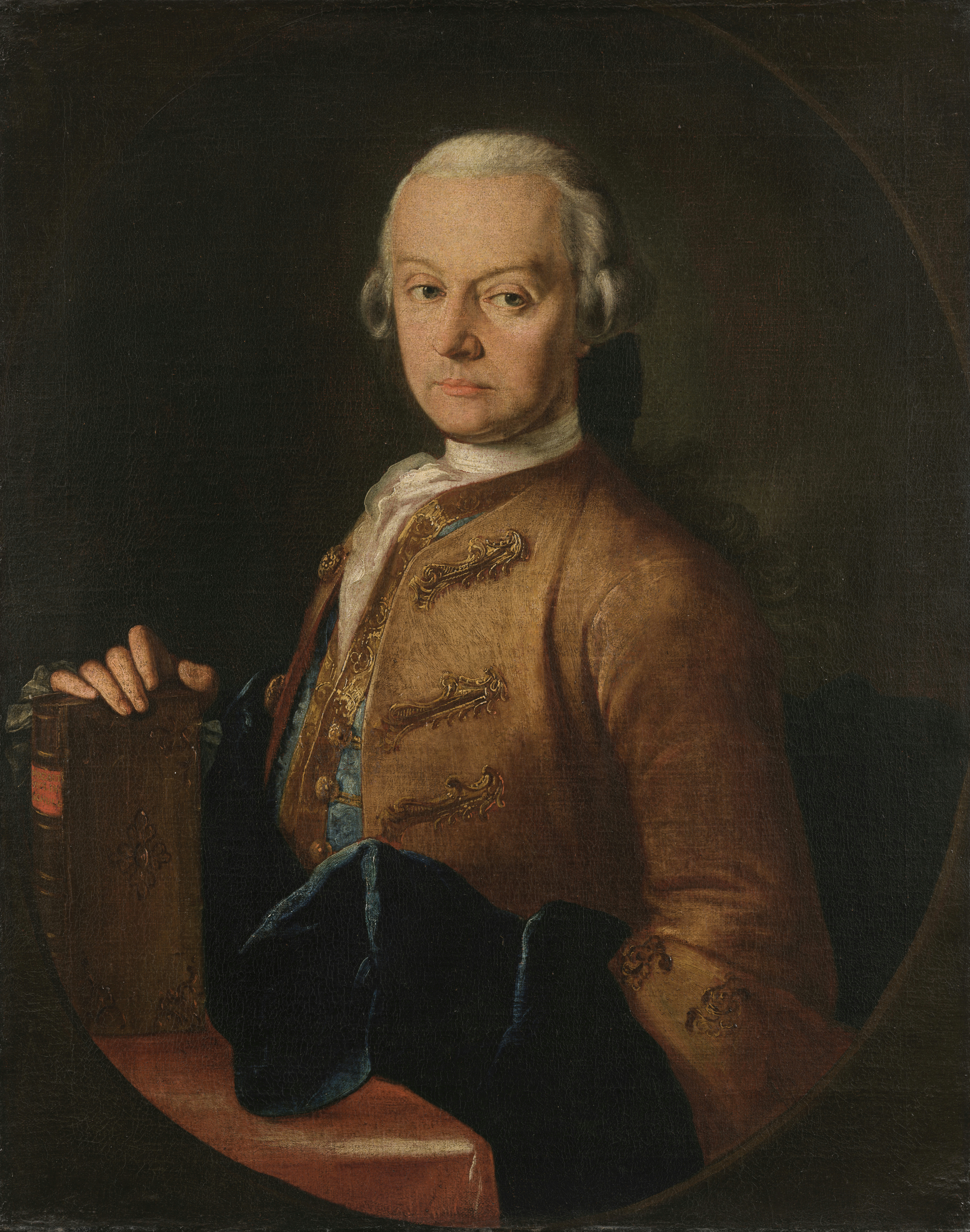
Leopold Mozart, whose symphonies were often attributed in error to his son Wolfgang

There are numerous reasons why symphonic works have been misattributed to Mozart. For example:

- A habit of the youthful Mozart was to copy parts of the music of other composers, for his own study purposes. The later discoveries of music scores, or fragments, in Mozart's hand, sometimes led to the belief that the work was his. In particular this factor has led to confusion between the early symphonies of Wolfgang and those of his father Leopold, and also those of other composers in the Mozart circle such as Michael Haydn.
- Mozart, when a mature composer and performer, would sometimes include the work of another—usually young and struggling—composer in one of his regular symphony concerts. Although he would present the true composer to the audience, the work's tenuous association with Mozart would sometimes lead to a continuing belief that he was the composer.
- Musical publishing and distribution methods were very lax in 18th century Europe, with manuscript versions of music being freely circulated. This could easily lead to confusion about authorship, and frequent misattribution.
- Early inaccuracies in identifying Mozart's works, for example by the Hamburg music dealer Johann Christoph Westphal, were carried forward into the later formal cataloguing by Breitkopf and Härtel and Köchel, and had a tendency to persist.
- An unknown number of Mozart's works are lost. Occasional "finds" of late 18th century music, particularly in places which have association with Mozart through personal visits or concert performances, have sometimes been rather hastily attributed to him, only to be disqualified on the discovery of contrary evidence.

== Köchel catalogue: explanation ==
The Köchel catalogue, generally accepted as the definitive listing of Mozart's works, was published by Ludwig von Köchel in 1862, and has been revised and updated on several subsequent occasions. The original catalogue, known as K^{1}, listed incomplete or lost works in an appendix or "Anhang", without regard to chronological order. These works were identified by an "Anh.", not a "K" number. In the sixth edition of the catalogue (1964, K^{6}), the Anhang was extended to include doubtful and spurious works, and this is retained in the latest edition (2024, K^{9}). On the basis of the most recent research and discoveries, some of the old K^{1} Anhangs were promoted to "K" status, while others were relegated from the main catalogue into the K^{6} Anhang. However, as Neal Zaslaw (the editor of K^{9}) pointed out, the K^{6} allocations between main listing and Anhang are not reliable indicators of authenticity or otherwise. Zaslaw deemed some of the divisions "arbitrary", and called for "clearer, more honest categories" for the problematic works.

"Deest" is used to identify works that have not been included in any of the Köchel catalogue versions, but which have at some stage in the past been thought of as Mozart compositions.

== Mozart's symphonies of spurious authenticity ==
K^{1}	K^{6}	Year	Title	Mvts	Comments	Ref(s)
K. 17	Anh. C11.02	1765?	Symphony in B♭ major "No. 2" (In AMA, Series VIII)	4	Attributed to Mozart in K^{1} on the basis of a 19th-century copy, and labelled his second symphony, the provenance of this work has since been questioned, chiefly on the grounds of low quality (Dearling calls it "rustic and rather awkward.") Current assumption is that it is not Wolfgang's, but could be a Leopold Mozart symphony.	
K. 18	Anh. A51	1764?	Symphony in E♭ major "No. 3" (In AMA, Series VIII) (In NMA, Section 110 [for arrangements])	3	Included in K^{1} as Mozart's third symphony, this has been identified as Symphony No. 18 by Carl Friedrich Abel, copied and re-orchestrated by Mozart in London, as an exercise.	
K. 444	Anh. A53	1784?	Symphony in G major "No. 37" (In AMA, Series VIII) (In NMA, Section 109 [for arrangements])	3	A symphony by Michael Haydn, Perger No. 16, for which Mozart wrote a 20-bar slow introduction and re-orchestrated the remainder. It was premiered in Linz at the same concert as Mozart's 36th ("Linz") symphony. Until 1907 the entire work was thought to be Mozart's, and it was frequently performed as his 37th.	

== Mozart's symphonies of doubtful authenticity ==
K^{1}	K^{6}	Year	Title	Mvts	Comments	Ref(s)
K. 15a–ss	K. 15a–ss	1764	Keyboard sketches in E♭ major ("Symphony No. 0")	4	Mozart's London notebook contains 43 music sketches, catalogued K. 15a to K. 15ss. From four of these, Mozart scholar Neal Zaslaw has hypothesized a possible lost "London" symphony in four movements. The chief basis for this conjecture is his interpretation of remarks by Nannerl Mozart, quoted in Zaslaw, p. 17, but there is no independent evidence of the work's existence.	
K. 16b	Anh. C11.01	1765	Symphony in C major (LMV VII:C3)	2, 3?	This work from the London period exists only in sketch form, with the first two movements (an Allegro in C and an Andante in F) attributed to "Mozart"; the third movement (an Allegro in F) does not name a composer, and considering its key, cannot belong to the same work. The first movement matches an incipit of a lost symphony by Leopold Mozart (LMV VII:C3); the composer of the third movement is unknown.	
Anh. 220	K. 16a (K^{9}. Anh. C11.18)	Unknown (Probably from 1760s to 1770s)	Symphony in A minor ("Odense") (In NMA, Section 113 [for works of doubtful authenticity])	3	The orchestral parts for this work were found in Odense, Denmark, in 1983 and were hailed as the discovery of a lost A minor symphony. The first performance took place on 9 December 1984. Since then, examination of the manuscript and analysis of the lost work's history have led to the conclusion that the work is probably one of a number of spurious symphonies handled by Hamburg music dealer J.C. Westphal. (d. 1797)	
Anh. 222	K. 19b	1765?	Symphony in C major	–	A three-bar Allegro opening, all that exists of this work, was identified by musicologist Alfred Einstein as part of a lost C major symphony from Mozart's London period. Doubts have subsequently been cast on its origins, and its attribution is now uncertain.	
K. 76	K. 42a	1767?	Symphony in F major "No. 43" (In AMA, Series XXIV) (In NMA, Section 46)	4	Until recently its attribution to Mozart was accepted, but is now uncertain. Possibly by Leopold Mozart (Zaslaw), but this is disputed by Leopold expert Cliff Eisen, who thinks it the work of neither Leopold nor Wolfgang.	
Anh. 214	K. 45b	1767?	Symphony in B♭ major "No. 55" (Intended for AMA, Series XXIV) (In NMA, Section 46)	4	Symphony was lost until a copy was found in Berlin, 1943. The origins of the symphony are disputed (1767, Salzburg per Zaslaw, 1768, Vienna per NMA). Attribution to Mozart cannot be confirmed, but it is frequently treated as genuine.	
Anh. 215	K. 66c	1768?	Symphony in D major	–	One of a group of three lost symphonies (see 66d and 66e) known only by incipits in the Breitkopf & Härtel catalogue. Dearling speculates they may have been written later, in preparation for the family's 1769 Italian trip, but there is no direct evidence that they are Mozart's work.	
Anh. 217	K. 66d	1768?	Symphony in B♭ major	–	See note on K. 66c	
Anh. 218	K. 66e	Unknown	Symphony in B♭ major	–	See note on K. 66c	
Anh. 216	Anh. C11.03 (K^{3}. and K^{9}. 74g)	1770?	Symphony in B♭ major "No. 54" (Intended for AMA, Series XXIV) (In NMA, Section 113 [for works of doubtful authenticity])	4	Until 1910 this was known only by an incipit. A copy, since lost, was then discovered in the Berlin library, and the work was assumed to be authentic, on the basis of "style" rather than substantiation. Modern opinion, in the absence of direct evidence, is that its authorship remains uncertain.	
K. 98	Anh. C11.04	1770?	Symphony in F major "No. 56" (In AMA, Series XXIV)	4	Originally taken as authentic Mozart by, among others, Köchel, the symphony has since come to be regarded as the work of an unidentified composer with no connection to the Mozart circle.	
–	Anh. C11.05	Unknown	Symphony in B♭ major	1	Published in Paris around 1806, lost and rediscovered in 1937, this was then thought to be a second "Paris symphony". However, its low quality ("a third rate imitation of a French operetta overture" – Zaslaw) indicated that it was more likely a forgery by an unknown hand.	
Anh. 219	Anh. C11.06	Unknown	Symphony in D major (LMV VII:D11)	–	Listed in the Brietkopf & Härtel catalogue as a Mozart work obtained from Hamburg music dealer Johann Christoph Westphal, this is a symphony by Leopold Mozart.	
–	Anh. C11.07	Unknown	Symphony in D major	–	Known only by 2-bar incipit in the Breitkopf & Härtel Manuscript Catalogue. Attribution to Mozart uncertain.	
–	Anh. C11.08	Unknown	Symphony in F major	–	Known only by 4-bar incipit in the Breitkopf & Härtel Manuscript Catalogue. Attribution to Mozart uncertain.	
K. 81	K. 73l	1770	Symphony in D major "No. 44" (LMV VII:D14) (In AMA, Series XXIV) (In NMA, Section 47)	3	Opinion is divided on the authorship, between Leopold and Wolfgang Mozart. Originally listed in the Breitkopf catalogue as Leopold's, later conjecture has proposed the work as Wolfgang's, but there is no certainty either way.	
K. 97	K. 73m	1770	Symphony in D major "No. 47" (In AMA, Series XXIV) (In NMA, Section 47)	4	Only the lack of an autograph score has created uncertainty in this symphony's attribution. It is frequently accepted as authentic Mozart. Dearling expresses no doubt as to its authenticity.	
K. 95	K. 73n	1770?	Symphony in D major "No. 45" (In AMA, Series XXIV) (In NMA, Section 47)	4	Zaslaw describes this as a symphony whose authenticity has "never been seriously enough questioned". Apart from the lack of an autograph score, the grounds for its assignment to 1770 and Rome in K^{1} and K^{6} are unstated. The work has Mozartian characteristics, and may be genuine but from an earlier period, but this cannot be verified.	
K. 84	K. 73q	1770	Symphony in D major "No. 11" (In AMA, Series VIII) (In NMA, Section 47)	3	Copies of the score from Vienna, Berlin, and Prague attribute the work respectively to Wolfgang, Leopold, and Carl Dittersdorf. Stylistic analysis indicates that, of the three, Wolfgang is the most likely composer, and Dittersdorf the least.	
K. 75	K. 75	1771	Symphony in F major "No. 42" (In AMA, Series XXIV) (In NMA, Section 47)	4	Although its authenticity is uncertain, its attribution to Mozart has not been generally questioned, despite what Zaslaw calls a "mysterious provenance". Also, the Minuet and Trio is atypically the second rather than the third movement.	
K. 96	K. 111b	1771?	Symphony in C major "No. 46" (In AMA, Series XXIV) (In NMA, Section 47)	4	Certain stylistic features challenge the work's assumed dating; the work may be of later provenance. In the absence of an autograph score or other direct evidence it cannot be attributed to Mozart with certainty. However, it is usually treated as authentic.	
Anh. 293	Anh. C11.09	1775	Symphony in G major (LMV VII:G8)	4	Widely accepted as a symphony by Leopold Mozart, it has in the past been attributed to Wolfgang.	
K. 291	Anh. A52	1781?	Symphony in D major (In AMA, Series XXIV) (In NMA, Section 110 [for arrangements])	3	This symphony, Perger No. 43 by Michael Haydn, was wrongly attributed to Mozart on the basis of a fragment of manuscript which Mozart copied, apparently to help him study the fugue form of the final movement.	
–	Anh. A59	1783?	Four incipits in D, G, and D and C major	–	Three of these incipits have been identified with symphonies by Joseph Haydn: Nos 47, 62 and 75. The fourth is unidentified, and is possibly a fragment of a lost Mozart symphony.	
–	Anh. C11.10	Unknown	Symphony in F major, Ben 136	?	A symphony, wrongly attributed to Mozart, by Ignace Pleyel (1757–1831), an Austrian composer and Kapellmeister at Strasbourg in 1789. He wrote many symphonies and other orchestral pieces, but his greatest fame was as a piano manufacturer.	
–	Anh. C11.11	1783	Symphony in C major, RicG C4	?	A symphony by the Bohemian composer Adalbert Gyrowetz (1763–1850). This was performed in 1785 at a concert given by Mozart in Vienna, and assumed to be Mozart's own work.	
–	Anh. C11.12	Unknown	Symphony in F major, GraD F27	–	Zaslaw identifies this work, from the K.^{6} Anhang as a symphony of Carl Dittersdorf, mistakenly attributed to Mozart.	
Anh. 294	Anh. C11.13	Unknown	Symphony in G major, LMV VII:G3	–	Zaslaw identifies this work, from the K.^{6} Anhang as a symphony by Leopold Mozart.	
–	Anh. C11.14	Unknown	Symphony in C major	?	Discovered in Milan in 1944, and announced as a lost Mozart symphony, this was found to be the work of Anton (also known as Franz Josef) Eberl (1765–1807), a near-contemporary of Mozart's, whose compositions sometimes appeared under Mozart's name.	
–	Anh. C11.15	Unknown	Symphony in C major	4	Symphony by an unknown composer, manuscript held by the Národní Muzeum, Prague. The name "Mozart" appears on the cover, but, according to Zaslaw: "There are no compelling source or musical reasons to suppose that (this) came from the pen of Wolfgang Mozart".	
–	Anh. C11.16	Unknown	Symphony in G or C major	–	A symphony by an unknown composer, identified by Zaslaw as at some time attributed to Mozart, but no details of its provenance are given.	
–	K. deest (K^{9}. Anh. C11.17)	1767	Symphony in G major ("Neue Lambach", LMV VII:G16)	4	Discovered at the Lambach monastery which the Mozart family visited in 1769, this is generally accepted as by Leopold Mozart rather than Wolfgang. Dearling notes a "remarkable" resemblance to Dittersdorf's Symphony No. 1.	
–	K. deest	1760	"Sinfonia"	1	A work by Johann Georg Wassmuth (d. 1766), court composer and Kapellmeister at Würzburg. A manuscript in the Thurn und Taxis library, Regensburg, wrongly attributes it to Mozart.	
–	K. deest	1785	Symphony in C minor	4	A symphony by Joseph Martin Kraus (1756–1792), mistakenly categorised by Bibliothèque nationale, Paris 1971, as a work by Mozart, probably based on misreading of the manuscript signature.	
–	K. deest	1730	Symphony in D major	2	A work, Artaserse, by Johann Adolph Hasse, mistakenly attributed to Mozart by the later addition of his name on the original manuscript in Thurn und Taxis library, Regensburg.	
–	K. deest	1761	Symphony in D major	4	A symphony of Joseph Haydn, identified as Hob. I:6., mentioned by Zaslaw as having a spurious attribution to Mozart at one time.	

== See also ==
- List of symphonies by Wolfgang Amadeus Mozart
- List of compositions by Wolfgang Amadeus Mozart

== Sources ==
- Arnold, Denis, ed. (1983). New Oxford Companion to Music. Oxford: OUP. ISBN 0-193-11316-3.
- Dearling, Robert (1982). The Music of Wolfgang Amadeus Mozart: The Symphonies. London: Associated University Presses Ltd. ISBN 0-8386-2335-2.
- Kenyon, Nicholas (2006). The Pegasus Pocket Guide to Mozart. New York: Pegasus Books. ISBN 1-933648-23-6.
- Sadie, Stanley (2006). Mozart: The Early Years, 1756–81. London: W. W. Norton & Co. ISBN 0-393-06112-4.
- Sadie, Stanley, ed. (1980). The New Grove Dictionary of Music and Musicians. London: Macmillan. ISBN 0-333-23111-2.
- Zaslaw, Neal (1991). Mozart's Symphonies: Context, Performance Practice, Reception. Oxford: Clarendon Press. ISBN 0-19-816286-3.
- "Köchel Catalog of Mozart's works". ClassicalNet. 2008.
- "Neue Mozart-Ausgabe (New Mozart Edition)". Bärenreiter-Verlag.
