= Symphony, K. 74g (Mozart) =

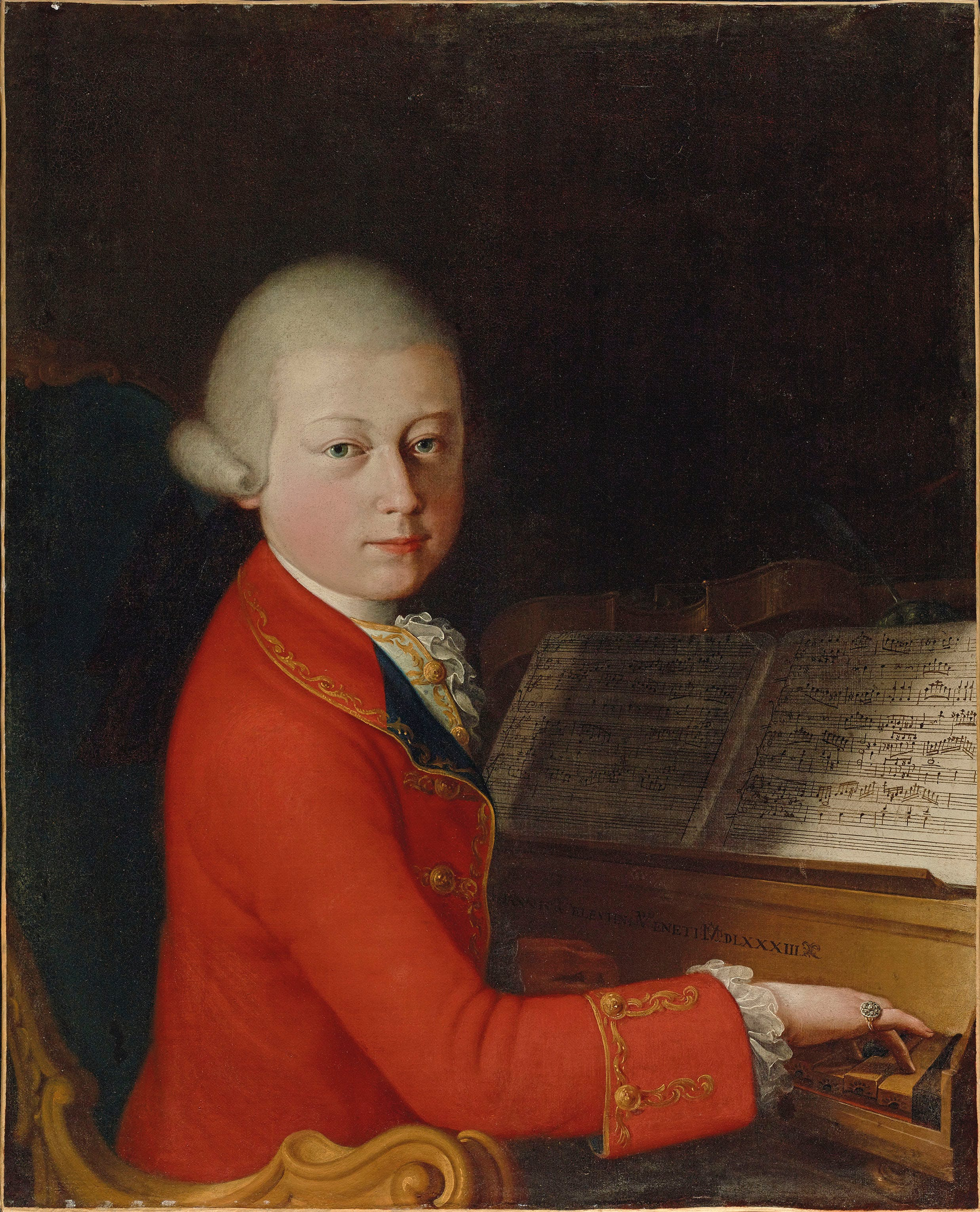
1770 Verona portrait of Mozart

The Symphony in B♭ major "No. 54", K. Anh. 216/Anh.C 11.03/74g, may have been written by Wolfgang Amadeus Mozart in 1771, in Salzburg.

The symphony is scored for two oboes or two flutes, two horns and strings. In contemporary orchestras, it was also usual to include bassoons and harpsichord if they were available in the orchestra to reinforce the bass line and act as the continuo. The duration is approximately 14 minutes.

The symphony consists of the following movements:

1. Allegro, 3/4
2. Andante, 2/4
3. Menuet, 3/4
4. Allegro molto, 2/4

The Alte Mozart-Ausgabe (published 1879–1882) gives the numbering sequence 1–41 for the 41 numbered symphonies. The unnumbered symphonies (some, including K. 74g, published in supplements to the Alte-Mozart Ausgabe until 1910) are sometimes given numbers in the range 42 to 56, even though they were written earlier than Mozart's Symphony No. 41 (written in 1788). The symphony K. 74g is given the number 54 in this numbering scheme.

== History and attribution ==
This symphony (among others) was known to Ludwig Ritter von Köchel only by an incipit in the catalogue of Breitkopf & Härtel, and so he placed it in the Anhang of the Köchel catalogue as Anh. 216. A set of parts (now lost) was discovered in the Berlin State Library in the early 20th century and was published by Breitkopf & Härtel in 1910 and edited by Max Seiffert. This set of parts may have been taken out of the library by Seiffert before they were catalogued (since the set of parts were never catalogued) and then never returned (this presumably went unnoticed as they had not been catalogued). Zaslaw speculates that the parts may have become part of the Berlinka art collection and joined other Mozart manuscripts in the Jagellonian Library in Kraków.

Due to the loss of the parts, the only source for this symphony was the Breitkopf & Härtel edition (from the Alte Mozart-Ausgabe). Max Seiffert wrote that in an old handwritten catalogue from Breitkopf & Härtel twelve symphonies that were once held in the publishing house are listed, but all had been lost and Köchel could only catalogue them in the appendix as Anh. 214–223 (overlooking two of them), but later two were found in the Berlin State Library, K. Anh. 214 and 216. They were dated 1770–1771, from Italy.

Alfred Einstein wrote in his edition of the Köchel catalogue that he believed that the symphony was composed between the two Italian journeys in early summer 1771 in Salzburg, gave the symphony the number "74g" and expressed no doubts as to Mozart's authorship. The sixth edition of the Köchel catalogue gave the symphony the number "Anh.C 11.03", putting it into the spurious and doubtful works category for stylistic reasons. The ninth edition restored it to Einstein's number "74g", although it is still considered doubtful.

For the twelve symphonies (K. Anh. 214–223, K. Anh.C 11.07, and K. Anh.C 11.08) that were originally only known by an incipit in the Breitkopf & Härtel catalogue, the current statuses of their authenticity are:

K^{1}	K^{9}	GA No.	Key	Authenticity	Incipit (where the work is extant, incipit is on the work's own page)
**Anh. 214**	**45b**	55	B♭ major	Doubtful	see article
**Anh. 215**	**66c**	—	D major	Lost	
**Anh. 216** (K^{3}. 74g, K^{6}. Anh.C 11.03)	**74g**	54	B♭ major	Doubtful	see above
**Anh. 217**	**66d**	—	B♭ major	Lost	
**Anh. 218**	**66e**	—	B♭ major	Lost	
Anh. 219	Anh.C 11.06	—	D major	Spurious; actually by Leopold Mozart	not available
**Anh. 220** (K^{3}. and K^{6}. 16a)	**Anh.C 11.18**	—	A minor	Spurious	see article
**Anh. 221**	**45a**	—	G major	Unquestionably genuine	see article
**Anh. 222**	**19b**	—	C major	Lost and doubtful	see article
**Anh. 223**	**19a**	—	F major	Unquestionably genuine	see article
**(K^{3}. Anh. 223)**	**Anh.C 11.07**	—	D major	Lost and doubtful	
**(K^{3}. Anh. 223)**	**Anh.C 11.08**	—	F major	Lost and doubtful	

(Symphonies which may have been written by Mozart have their Köchel numbers bolded.)

Some symphonies are still missing (K. 19b, 66c, 66d, 66e, Anh.C 11.07, and Anh.C 11.08), and some not in the catalogue of Breitkopf & Härtel were included into the main catalogue (K. 75, K. 76, K. 81, K. 95, K. 96, K. 97 and K. 98) despite the manuscripts being unauthorized. However, since these symphonies with unauthorised manuscripts (and K. 45b, which was discovered later) were considered to be by Mozart for stylistic reasons, it would be logical that these symphonies and K. 74g should either all be considered doubtful or all be considered authentic.

The Neue Mozart-Ausgabe puts K. 74g in the supplement of "Works of Doubtful Authenticity" and includes a detailed discussion of the sources and authenticity so that, as with the other symphonies of uncertain authorship, a possible authorship of Mozart may be conceded with all due caution.

The symphony has been recorded by the Academy of Ancient Music and The English Concert.
