= Symphony No. 54 =

Symphony No. 54 may refer to:

- Symphony No. 54 (Haydn) in G major (Hoboken I/54) by Joseph Haydn, 1774
- Symphony No. 54 (Mozart) in B-flat major (K. Anh. 216/74g/Anh.C 11.03) probably by Wolfgang Amadeus Mozart, 1771
