= Symphony No. 44 =

Symphony No. 44 may refer to:

- Symphony No. 44 (Haydn) in E minor (Hoboken I/44, Trauer) by Joseph Haydn, 1772
- Symphony No. 44 (Mozart) in D major (K. 81/73l) probably by Wolfgang Amadeus Mozart, 1770
