= Symphony No. 45 =

Symphony No. 45 may refer to:

- Symphony No. 45 (Haydn) in F-sharp minor (Hoboken I/45, Farewell) by Joseph Haydn, 1772
- Symphony No. 45 (Mozart) in D major (K. 95/73n) probably by Wolfgang Amadeus Mozart, 1770
