= Symphony No. 47 =

Symphony No. 47 may refer to:

- Symphony No. 47 (Haydn) in G major (Hoboken I/47, The Palindrome) by Joseph Haydn, c. 1772
- Symphony No. 47 (Mozart) in D major (K. 97/73m) probably by Wolfgang Amadeus Mozart, 1770
