= Symphony No. 46 =

Symphony No. 46 may refer to:

- Symphony No. 46 (Haydn) in B major (Hoboken I/46) by Joseph Haydn, 1772
- Symphony No. 46 (Mozart) in C major (K. 96/111b) probably by Wolfgang Amadeus Mozart, 1771
