= Mozart in Italy =

Wolfgang Amadeus Mozart's three journeys to Italy

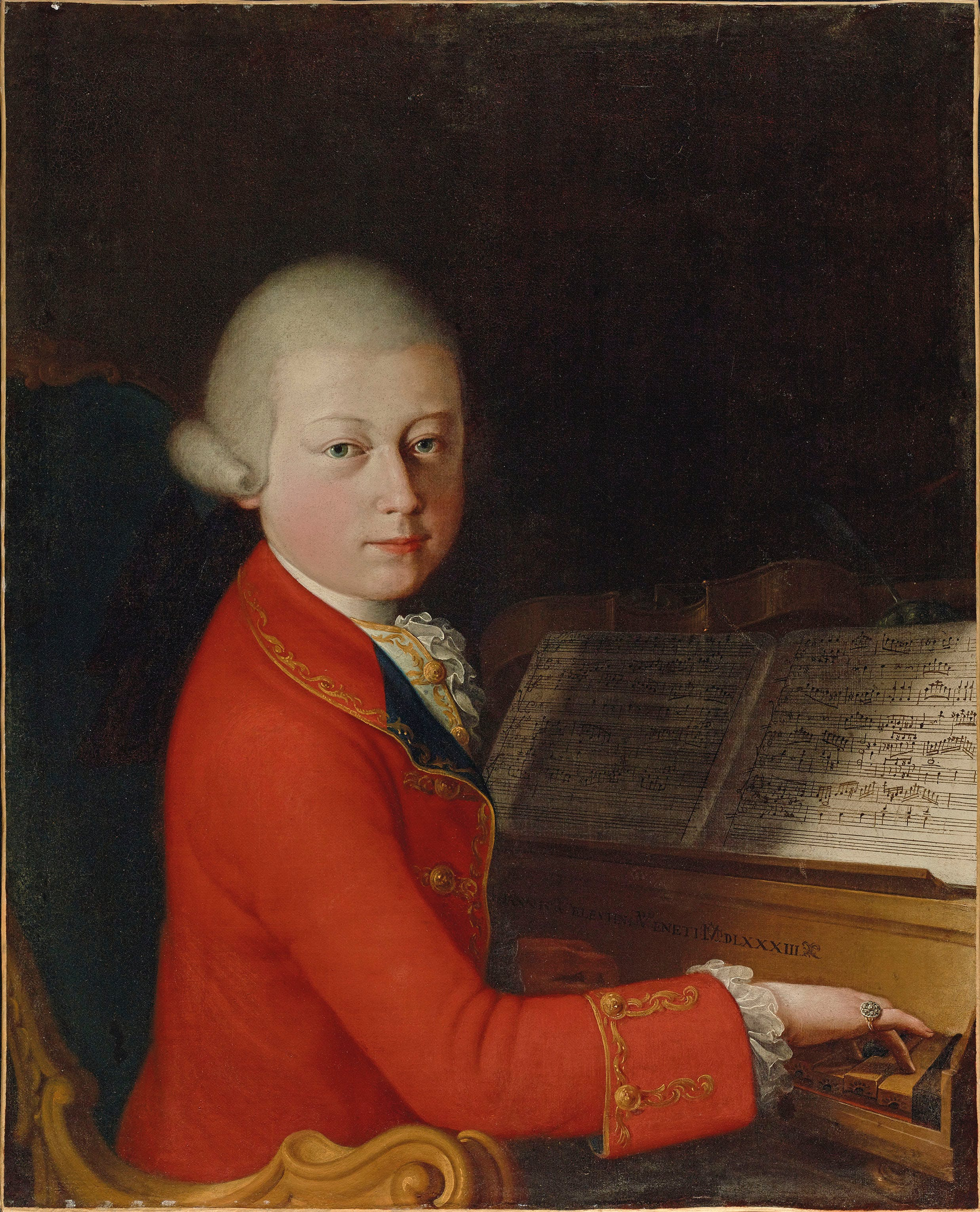
Portrait of Mozart, aged 13, in Verona, 1770, attributed to Giambettino Cignaroli

Between 1769 and 1773, the young Wolfgang Amadeus Mozart and his father Leopold made three Italian journeys. The first, an extended tour of 15 months, was financed by performances for the nobility and by public concerts, and took in the most important Italian cities. The second and third journeys were to Milan, for Wolfgang to complete operas that had been commissioned there on the first visit. From the perspective of Wolfgang's musical development, the journeys were a considerable success, and his talents were recognised by honours which included a papal knighthood and memberships in leading philharmonic societies.

Leopold Mozart had been employed since 1747 as a musician in the Archbishop of Salzburg's court, becoming deputy Kapellmeister in 1763, but he had also devoted much time to Wolfgang's and his sister Nannerl's musical education. He took them on a European tour between 1763 and 1766, and spent some of 1767 and most of 1768 with them in the imperial capital, Vienna. The children's performances had captivated audiences, and the pair had made a considerable impression on European society. By 1769, Nannerl had reached adulthood, but Leopold was anxious to continue 13-year-old Wolfgang's education in Italy, a crucially important destination for any rising composer of the 18th century.

During the first tour, Wolfgang's performances were well received, and his compositional talents recognised by commissions to write three operas for Milan's Teatro Regio Ducale, each of which was a critical and popular triumph. He met many of Italy's leading musicians, including the renowned theorist Giovanni Battista Martini, under whom he studied in Bologna. Leopold also hoped that Wolfgang, and possibly he himself, would obtain a prestigious appointment at one of the Italian Habsburg courts. This objective became more important as Leopold's advancement in Salzburg became less likely; but his persistent efforts to secure employment displeased the imperial court, which precluded any chance of success. The journeys thus ended not with a triumphant return, but on a note of disappointment and frustration.

== Background ==
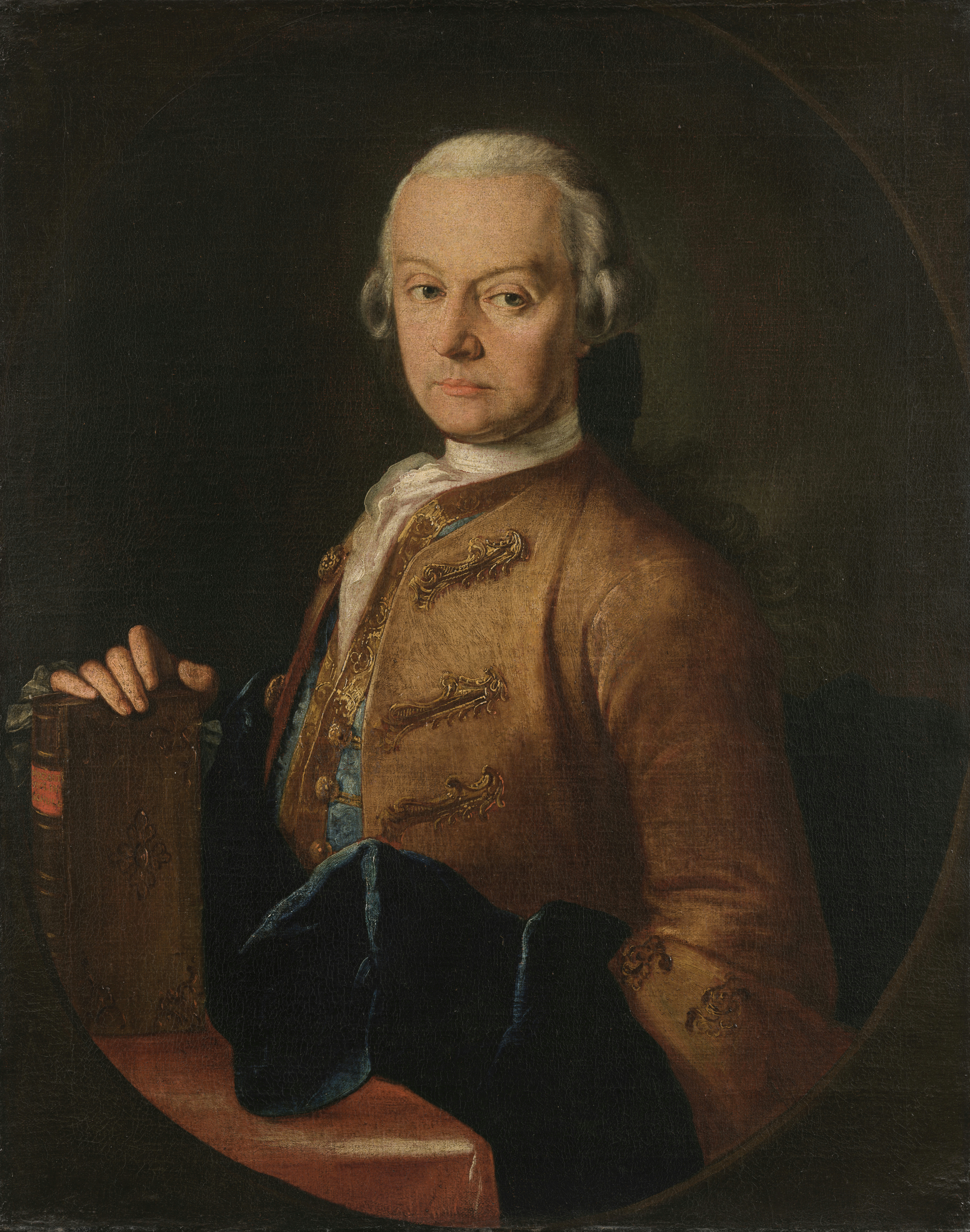
Leopold Mozart, who was anxious to extend Wolfgang's musical education in Italy

In November 1766, the Mozart family returned to Salzburg after a three-and-a-half-year "grand tour" of the major Northern European cities, begun when Wolfgang was seven and Nannerl twelve. This tour had largely achieved Leopold's objective to demonstrate his children's talents to the wider world and advance their musical education. A stay in Vienna beginning in 1767 proved less happy: an outbreak of smallpox, which led to the death of the Archduchess Maria Josepha of Austria, prevented the children from performing in the imperial court and forced the family to seek refuge in Bohemia, a move which did not prevent Wolfgang from contracting the disease. They returned to Vienna in January 1768, but by now the children were no longer young enough to cause a sensation in their public concerts. Leopold fell out with the court impresario Giuseppe Affligio, and damaged his relations with the eminent court composer Christoph Willibald Gluck, through an over-eagerness to secure a performance of Wolfgang's first opera, La finta semplice. As a consequence he developed a reputation at court for being importunate and "pushy".

After returning to Salzburg in January 1769, Leopold considered the 18-year-old Nannerl's education to be virtually finished, and focused his efforts on Wolfgang. He decided to take the boy to Italy, which in its pre-unification days was a collection of duchies, republics, and Papal States, with the Kingdom of Naples in the south. For more than two centuries Italy had been the source of innovations in musical style, the home of church music, and above all the cradle of opera. In Leopold's view, Wolfgang needed to absorb firsthand the music of Venice, Naples, and Rome, to equip himself for future commissions from Europe's opera houses, "the late eighteenth-century composers' honeypots" according to Mozart's biographer Stanley Sadie. Leopold wanted Wolfgang to immerse himself in the Italian language, to experience church music of the highest quality, and to extend his network of influential acquaintances. There was also the possibility, for both Wolfgang and Leopold, of securing positions in the northern Italian Habsburg courts. With these priorities in mind, Leopold decided that Nannerl and her mother should stay at home, a decision they resented but which made economic and practical sense.

In the months before their departure, Wolfgang composed prolifically, gaining the favour of Archbishop Siegmund Christoph von Schrattenbach, who, as Leopold's employer, had to consent to the journey. Permission to travel, along with a gift of 600 florins, was granted in October. Wolfgang was awarded the honorary title of Konzertmeister (court musician), with a hint that on his return this post would merit a salary.

== First journey, December 1769 – March 1771 ==
Map showing the main centres visited during the first Italian journey, December 1769 to March 1771. The black line shows the main outward route from Salzburg to Naples. The green line marks detours taken during the return journey.

=== Journey to Milan ===
On 13 December 1769, Leopold and Wolfgang set out from Salzburg, armed with testimonials and letters that Leopold hoped would smooth their passage. Among the most important was an introduction to Count Karl Joseph Firmian of Milan, described as the "King of Milan", an influential and cultivated patron of the arts. His support would be vital to the success of the entire Italian undertaking.

The pair travelled through Innsbruck, then due south to the Brenner Pass into Italy. They continued through Bolzano and Rovereto to Verona and Mantua, before turning west towards Milan. Leopold's financial plans for the journey were broadly the same as for the family's grand tour—travel and accommodation costs were to be met by concert proceeds. This 350-mile (560 km) winter journey to Milan occupied a difficult and unpleasant six weeks, with the weather forcing extended stops. Leopold complained in his letters home about unheated inn rooms: "freezing like a dog, everything I touch is ice". Early concert receipts were modest; according to Leopold, costs were running at around 50 florins a week. After having unwisely boasted about profits made from the grand tour, Leopold was now more cautious about revealing financial details. He tended to emphasise his expenses and minimise his takings, writing, for example: "On the whole we shall not make much in Italy ... one must generally accept admiration and bravos as payment."

The longest pause was two weeks spent in Verona, where the press reported glowingly on Wolfgang's concert of 5 January 1770. Father and son attended a performance of Guglielmi's Ruggiero, which Wolfgang wrote about dismissively in a letter to Nannerl. The boy also had his portrait painted by a local artist, most probably Giambettino Cignaroli. An alternative attribution to Saverio Dalla Rosa has also been suggested. The portrait had been commissioned by Pietro Lugiati, Receiver Général for the Venetian Republic. This interlude was followed by a shorter stop in Mantua, where Wolfgang gave a concert at the Accademia Filarmonica, with a programme designed to test his abilities in performance, sight-reading, and improvisation. According to a press review the audience was "dumbfounded" at this "miracle in music, one of those freaks that Nature causes to be born". In Mantua, they suffered a snub from Prince Michael of Thurn und Taxis, who informed them through a servant that he had no desire to meet them. Historian Robert Gutman surmises that the Prince, aware of the Affligio affair in Vienna, wanted no dealings with musicians who did not know their place. By contrast, Count Arco, whose family were members of the Salzburg court, received them warmly.

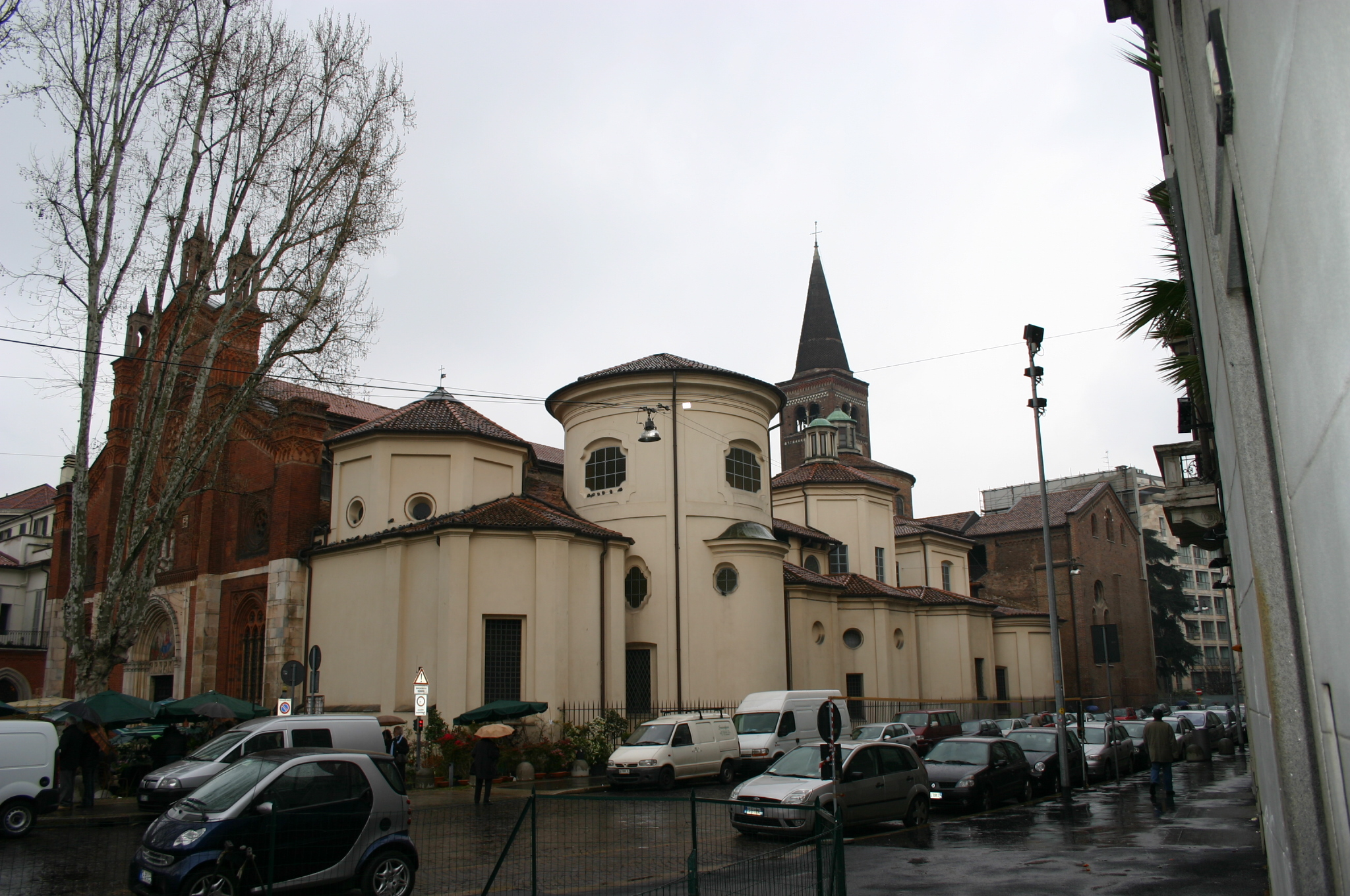
San Marco monastery, Milan, where the Mozarts lodged during their first visit to the city

The Mozarts arrived in Milan on 23 January and found comfortable lodgings in the monastery of San Marco, not far from Count Firmian's palace. While they waited to see the Count, they attended Niccolò Piccinni's opera Cesare in Egitto. Firmian eventually welcomed them with generous hospitality and friendship, presenting Wolfgang with a complete edition of the works of Metastasio, Italy's leading dramatic writer and librettist. Firmian also hosted a series of concerts attended by many of the city's notables, including Archduke Ferdinand, a possible future patron for the young composer. For the last of these occasions, Wolfgang wrote a set of arias using Metastasio's texts. These were so well received that Firmian commissioned Wolfgang to write the opening opera for the following winter's carnival season in Milan, just as Leopold had hoped he might. Wolfgang would receive a fee of around 500 florins, and free lodgings during the writing and rehearsal. The Mozarts left Milan on 15 March, heading south towards Florence and Rome, committed to return in the autumn and taking with them fresh letters of recommendation from Firmian.

Up to this point in the tour Wolfgang appears to have done little composition. The Accademia Filarmonica concert in Mantua had included much improvisation but little of Wolfgang's own music; the only certain compositions from this phase of the tour are the arias composed for the final Firmian concert, which sealed his contract for the carnival opera. These are Se tutti i mali miei, K. 83/73p, Misero me, K. 77/73e, and Ah più tremar ..., K. 71. The Symphony in G, K. 74, evidently completed in Rome in April, may have been started in Milan.

=== Milan to Naples ===
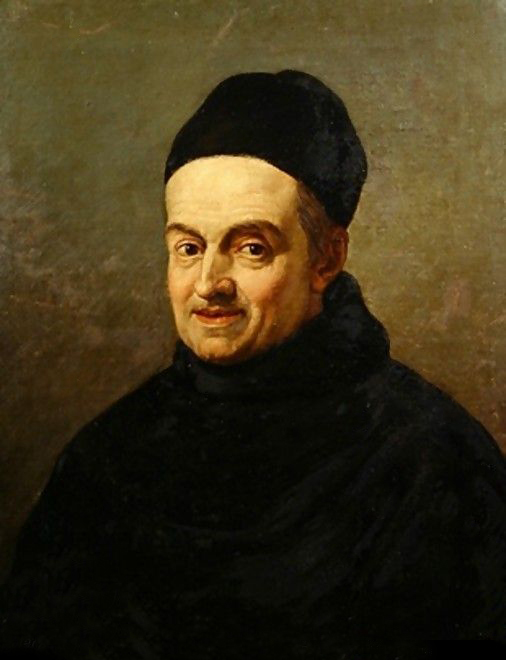
Giovanni Battista Martini, known as Padre Martini, tutored Mozart in counterpoint.

The first stop on the southward journey was at Lodi, where Wolfgang completed his first string quartet, K. 80/73f. After a few days in Parma, the Mozarts moved on to Bologna, a "centre for masters, artists and scholars", according to Leopold. Their letter from Firmian introduced them to Count Pallavicini-Centurioni, a leading patron of the arts, who immediately arranged a concert for the local nobility in his palace. Among the guests was Giovanni Battista Martini, the leading musical theorist of his day and Europe's most renowned expert in counterpoint. Martini received the young composer and tested him with exercises in fugue. Always with an eye upon Wolfgang's prospects in the courts of Europe, Leopold was anxious for engagement with the great master, but time was short, so he arranged a return to Bologna in the summer for extended tuition. The pair left on 29 March, carrying letters from Pallavicini that might clear the way for an audience with Pope Clement XIV in Rome. Before they left, they made the acquaintance of the Czech composer Josef Mysliveček, whose opera La Nitteti was being prepared for performance. Later in 1770, Wolfgang would use the Mysliveček opera as a source of motives for his own opera Mitridate, re di Ponto and various symphonies. More broadly, it marked the beginning of a close association between Mysliveček and the Mozart family that lasted until 1778. Wolfgang used his works repeatedly as models of compositional style.

The next day they arrived in Florence, where Pallavicini's recommendation gained them a meeting at the Palazzo Pitti with the Grand Duke and future emperor Leopold. He remembered the Mozarts from 1768 in Vienna, and asked after Nannerl. In Florence they encountered the violinist Pietro Nardini, whom they had met at the start of their grand tour of Europe; Nardini and Wolfgang performed together in a long evening concert at the Duke's summer palace. Wolfgang also met Thomas Linley, an English violin prodigy and a pupil of Nardini's. The two formed a close friendship, making music and playing together "not as boys but as men", as Leopold remarked. Gutman reports that "a melancholy Thomas followed the Mozarts' coach as they departed for Rome on 6 April". The boys never met again; Linley, after a brief career as a composer and violinist, died in a boating accident in 1778, at the age of 22.

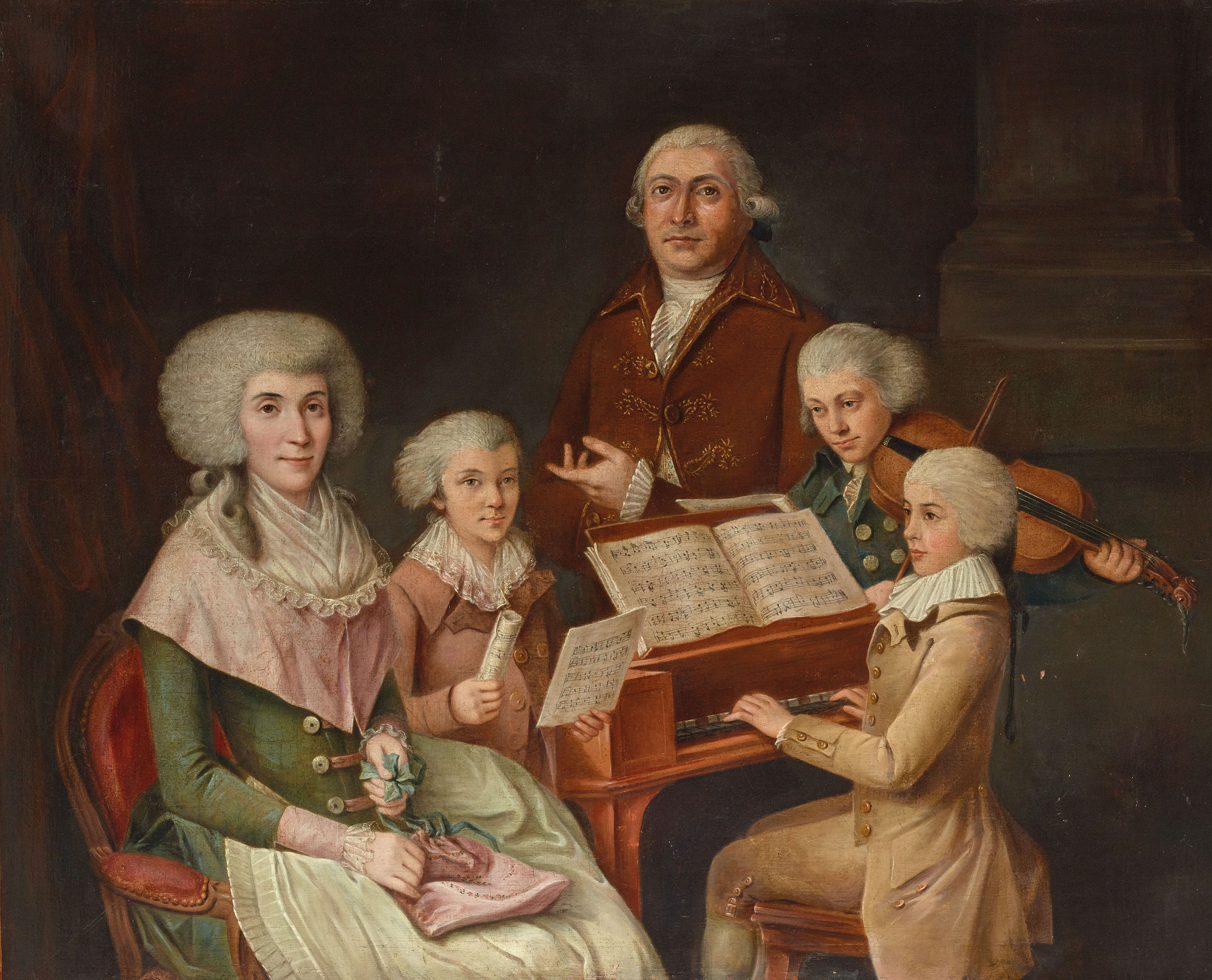
Presumed portrait of Mozart (at keyboard) and Thomas Linley (with violin), in Florence, 1770

After five days of difficult travel through wind and rain, lodged uncomfortably at inns Leopold described as disgusting, filthy, and bereft of food, they reached Rome. Pallavicini's letters soon had their effect: meetings with the Count's kinsman Lazaro Opizio Cardinal Pallavicino, Prince San Angelo of Naples, and Charles Edward Stuart, known as "Bonnie Prince Charlie", Pretender to the throne of Great Britain. There was much sightseeing, and performances before the nobility. The Mozarts visited the Sistine Chapel, where Wolfgang heard and later wrote down from memory Gregorio Allegri's famous Miserere, a complex nine-part choral work that had not been published. Amid these activities, Wolfgang was busily composing. He wrote the contradanse K. 123/73g and the aria Se ardire, e speranza (K. 82/73o), and finished the G major symphony begun earlier.

After four busy weeks the Mozarts departed for Naples. Travellers on the route through the Pontine Marshes were frequently harassed by brigands, so Leopold arranged a convoy of four coaches. They arrived on 14 May. Armed with their letters of recommendation, the Mozarts were soon calling on the prime minister, Marchese Bernardo Tanucci, and William Hamilton, the British ambassador, whom they knew from London. They gave a concert on 28 May, which brought in about 750 florins (Leopold would not reveal the exact amount) and attended the first performance of Niccolò Jommelli's opera Armida abbandonata at the Teatro di San Carlo. Wolfgang was impressed by both the music and the performance, though he felt it "too old-fashioned and serious for the theatre". Invited to write an opera for the next San Carlo season, he declined because of his prior commitment to Milan. When no summons to play at the royal court was forthcoming, Leopold eventually decided to leave Naples, after visits to Vesuvius, Herculaneum, Pompeii, and the Roman baths at Baiae. They departed by post-coach for Rome on 25 June.

=== Return from Naples ===
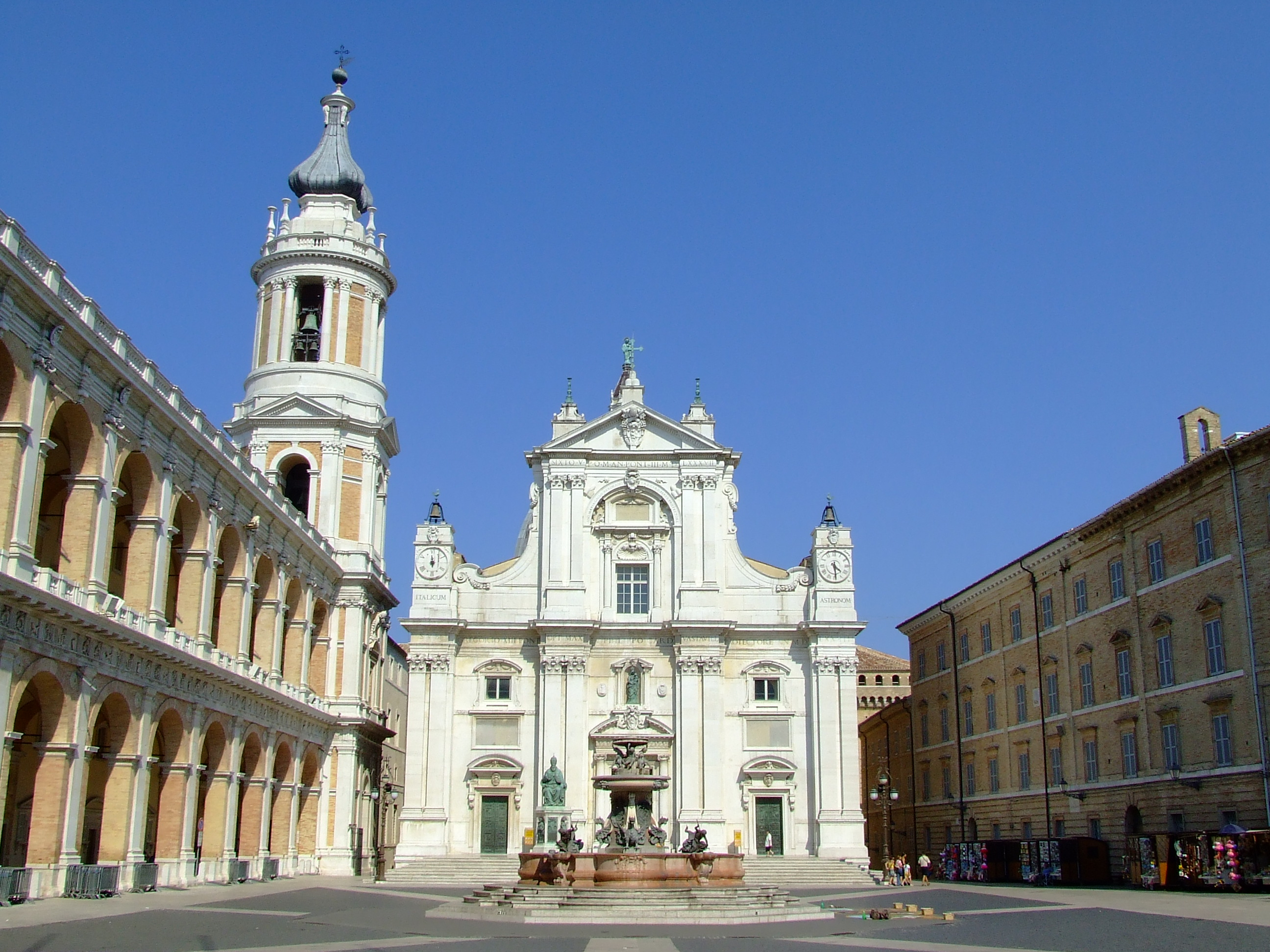
The Mozarts visited Santa Casa, Loreto, in July 1770.

The party made a rapid 27-hour return trip to Rome; in the process, Leopold sustained a leg injury that troubled him for several months. Wolfgang was granted an audience with the Pope, and was made a knight of the Order of the Golden Spur. From Rome they made their way to the famous Santa Casa pilgrimage site at Loreto, and took the coastal road to Rimini—under military protection, because the road was subject to attacks from marauding pirates. From Rimini they moved inland, and reached Bologna on 20 July.

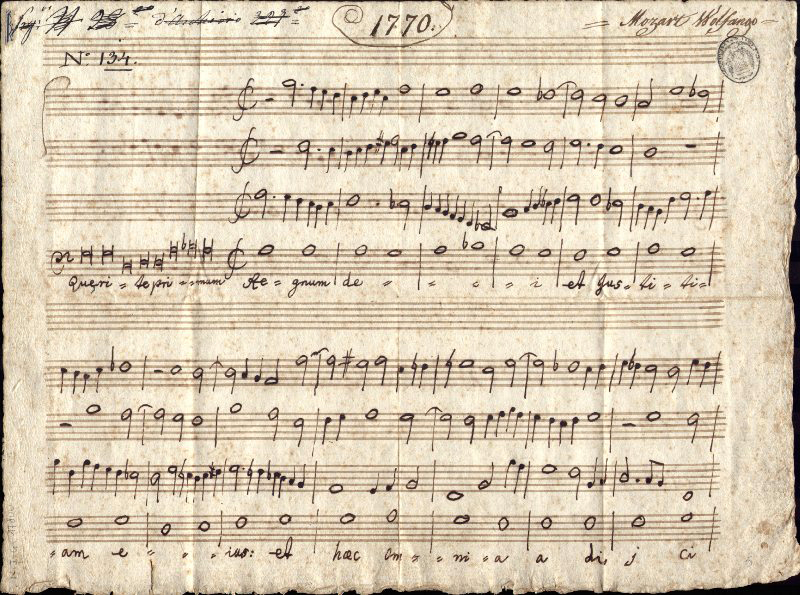
Wolfgang's Antiphon examination exercise at Bologna, as revised by Martini

Leopold's priority was to rest his leg. Wolfgang passed the time by composing a short minuet, K. 122/73t, and a Miserere in A minor, K. 85/73s. Meanwhile, the libretto for the Milan opera arrived; Leopold had been expecting Metastasio's La Nitteti, but it was Mitridate, re di Ponto, by Vittorio Cigna-Santi. According to the correspondence of Leopold, the composer Josef Mysliveček was a frequent visitor to the Mozart household while they were staying in Bologna. The musicologist Daniel E. Freeman believes that Mozart's approach to the composition of arias changed fundamentally at this time, bringing his style into closer alignment with that of Mysliveček.

Leopold and Wolfgang moved into Count Pallavicini's palatial summer residence on 10 August, and stayed for seven weeks while Leopold's leg gradually improved and Wolfgang worked on the Mitridate recitatives. At the beginning of October, with Leopold more or less recovered, they moved back to Bologna, and Wolfgang, it is thought, began his period of study under Martini. On 9 October he underwent examination for membership in Bologna's Accademia Filarmonica, offering as his test piece the antiphon Quaerite primum regnum, K. 86/73v. According to Gutman, under ordinary circumstances Wolfgang's "floundering" attempt at this unfamiliar polyphonic form would not have received serious consideration, but Martini was at hand to offer corrections, and probably also paid the admission fee. Wolfgang's membership was duly approved, and the Mozarts departed for Milan shortly afterwards.

=== Milan revisited, October 1770 – February 1771 ===
The journey from Bologna to Milan was delayed by storms and floods, but Leopold and his son arrived on 18 October, ten weeks before the first performance of Mitridate. Wolfgang's fingers ached from writing recitatives, and in any case he could not begin work on the arias until the singers were present, collaboration with the principal performers being the custom for composers of the time. As the singers assembled, problems arose. Quirino Gasparini, composer of an earlier version of Mitridate, tried to persuade the prima donna Antonia Bernasconi to use his settings for her arias, but met with failure. "Thank God", Leopold wrote, "that we have routed the enemy". However, the principal tenor, Guglielmo d'Ettore, made repeated requests for his arias to be rewritten, and sang one of Gasparini's settings in Act 3, an insertion that survives in the published score of the opera.

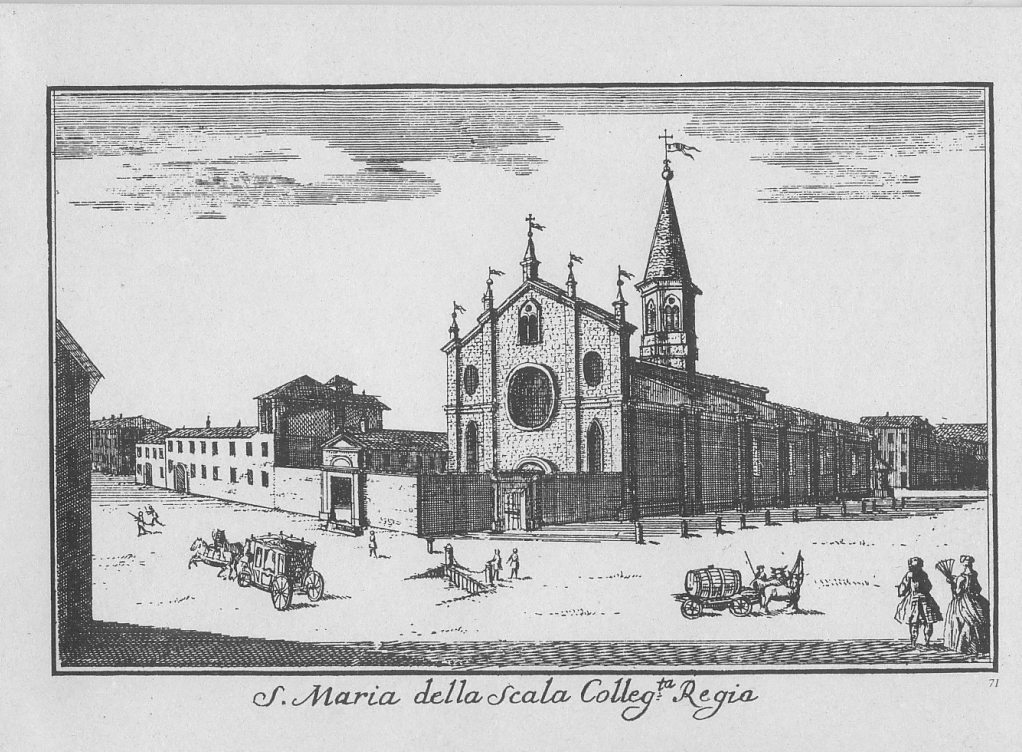
The Church of Santa Maria alla Scala, Milan, was demolished in 1788 to provide a site for the La Scala opera house, after the nearby Teatro Regio Ducale burned down.

Rehearsals began on 6 December. Wolfgang's mastery of Italian diction was revealed as the recitatives were practised, and a run-through of the instrumental score displayed his professionalism. Leopold wrote home: "An awful lot of this undertaking, blessed be God, is safely over, and, God be praised, once more with honour!" On 26 December, at the Teatro Regio Ducale (Milan's great opera house at the time), Wolfgang directed the first public performance from the keyboard, dressed for the occasion in a scarlet coat lined with blue satin and edged with gold. The occasion was a triumph: the audience demanded encores and at the conclusion cried "Evviva il maestro!" (Long live the master!). The opera ran for 22 performances, and the Gazetta di Milano praised the work handsomely: "The young maestro di capella, who is not yet fifteen years of age, studies the beauties of nature, and represents them adorned with the rarest musical graces." The arias sung by Bernasconi "vividly expressed the passions and touched the heart". Subsequent reactions to the opera proved less effusive; there are no records of further performances of Mitridate before its revival at the Salzburg Festival in 1971.

Having fulfilled his major obligation for his first trip to Italy by completing the opera Mitridate, Wolfgang gave a concert at Firmian's palace on 4 January 1771. A few days later, news arrived that Wolfgang had been granted membership in the Accademia Filarmonica of Verona. On 14 January, they departed for a two-week sojourn in Turin, where they met many of the leading Italian musicians: the distinguished violinist Gaetano Pugnani, his 15-year-old prodigy pupil Giovanni Battista Viotti, and the composer Giovanni Paisiello, whose opera Annibale in Torino Leopold declared to be magnificent. They returned to Milan for a farewell lunch with Firmian before their departure for Salzburg on 4 February.

=== Journey home ===
On their way back to Salzburg Leopold and Wolfgang stayed for a while at Venice, pausing on their way at Brescia to see an opera buffa. While in Venice, Leopold used his letters of introduction to meet the nobility and to negotiate a contract for Wolfgang to write an opera for the San Benedetto theatre. Wolfgang gave several concerts and perhaps played at Venice's famed ospidali—former orphanages which became respected music academies. The Mozarts were received generously, but Leopold appeared dissatisfied. "The father seems a shade piqued", wrote a correspondent to the Viennese composer Johann Adolph Hasse, adding: "they probably expected others to seek after them, rather than they after others". Hasse replied: "The father, as I see the man, is equally discontent everywhere".

Leaving Venice on 12 March, the Mozarts journeyed to Padua, where during a day of sightseeing Wolfgang was commissioned by Don Giuseppe Ximenes, Prince of Aragon, to compose an oratorio for the city. The history of La Betulia Liberata ("The Liberation of Bethulia") is obscure—it may not have been performed in Padua, or at all in Wolfgang's lifetime. In Verona, a few days later, he received further commissions. Wolfgang was to compose a serenata (or one-act opera) to be performed in Milan in October 1771 for the wedding of the Archduke Ferdinand and his bride Princess Beatrice of Modena. At the same time the young composer was engaged to undertake another Milan carnival opera, for the 1772–73 season, at an increased fee. This created a conflict of dates which prevented Wolfgang from proceeding with the San Benedetto contract. Thereafter, father and son sped northward, arriving home in Salzburg on 28 March 1771.

In his review of this first Italian journey, Maynard Solomon's analysis of the meagre financial information provided by Leopold indicates that the Mozarts made a substantial profit—perhaps as much as 2,900 florins. The pair had also been accorded wide recognition, moving among the highest Italian nobility. Aside from being honoured by the Pope, Wolfgang had been admitted to the academies of Bologna and Verona, and had studied with Martini. Solomon calls the tour Leopold's "finest hour and ... perhaps his happiest".

== Second journey, August–December 1771 ==
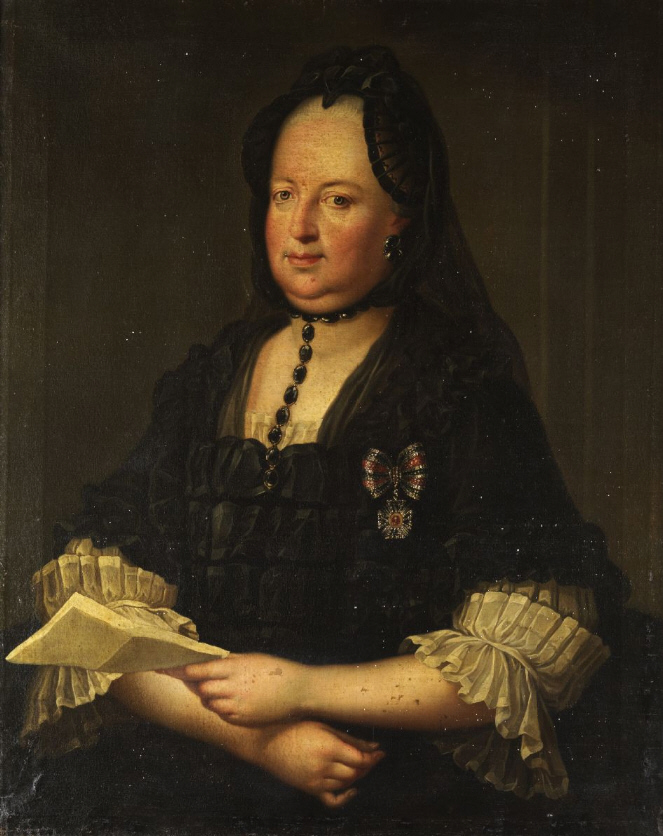
Empress Maria Theresa's dismissive letter barred Leopold's hoped-for appointment in one of the Habsburg courts.

In August 1771 Leopold and Wolfgang set out once more for Milan, to work on the serenata—which had by this time evolved into the full-length opera Ascanio in Alba. On arrival they shared their lodgings with violinists, a singing-master, and an oboist: a ménage that was, as Wolfgang wrote jestingly to Nannerl, "delightful for composing, it gives you plenty of ideas!" Working at great speed, Wolfgang finished Ascanio just in time for the first rehearsal on 23 September.

Ascanio was expected to be the lesser of the works for the wedding celebration, second to Hasse's opera Ruggiero. However, the 72-year-old Hasse was out of touch with current theatrical tastes, and although his opera was praised by the Empress Maria Theresa, its overall reception was lukewarm, especially compared to the triumphant success of Ascanio. Leopold expressed delight at this turn of events: "The archduke has recently ordered two copies", he wrote home. "All the noblemen and other people constantly address us in the street to congratulate Wolfgang. In short! I'm sorry, Wolfgang's Serenata has so crushed Hasse's opera that I can't describe it." Hasse was gracious about his eclipse, and is said to have remarked that the boy would cause all others to be forgotten.

The Mozarts were free to leave Milan early in November, but they stayed another month because Leopold hoped that the success of Ascanio would lead to an appointment for Wolfgang from a royal patron. He apparently solicited Archduke Ferdinand on 30 November, and his request was passed on to the imperial court in Vienna. It is possible that Leopold's pushiness in Vienna over La finta semplice still rankled, or that word of his crowing over Hasse's failure had reached the Empress. For whatever reason, Maria Theresa's reply to the archduke was unequivocal, describing the Mozarts as "useless people" whose appointment would debase the royal service, and adding that "such people go around the world like beggars". Leopold never learned this letter's contents; by the time it reached Milan the Mozarts had left, disappointed but still hopeful. "The matter is not over; I can say that much", Leopold wrote as he and Wolfgang made their way home.

Despite the hectic schedule during this short visit, Wolfgang still found time to write his Symphony in F, K. 112 (No. 13). He contrived a further symphony from the Ascanio overture, by adding a finale to the two existing movements. Another symphony, K. 96/111b, in C major, is sometimes allocated to this visit to Milan, but it is not certain when (or indeed whether) Wolfgang actually wrote it.

== Upheaval in Salzburg ==
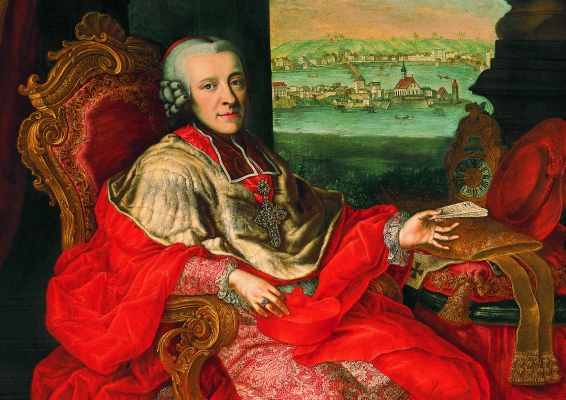
Hieronymus Count Colloredo, the new Archbishop of Salzburg, dashed Leopold's hopes for promotion.

The day after Leopold and Wolfgang arrived back in Salzburg the court was thrown into turmoil by the death of Archbishop Schrattenbach. This created problems for Leopold, who had unresolved issues with the court. Part of his salary during the second Italian visit had been stopped, and Leopold wished to petition for its payment, and to pursue the matter of Wolfgang's salary as a Konzertmeister, which Schrattenbach had indicated might be paid on Wolfgang's return from the first Italian journey. There was also the matter of succession to the post of Salzburg's Kapellmeister, to be available soon on the pending retirement of the incumbent, Giuseppe Lolli, who was over 70 years old; Leopold, who had followed Lolli as Vice-Kapellmeister, might normally have felt confident of succeeding him to the higher post. Decisions on these matters would now be made by the new archbishop, whose policies and attitudes were unknown.

On 14 March 1772, amid various political machinations, Count Hieronymus von Colloredo was elected to the archbishopric as a compromise candidate acceptable to the imperial court in Vienna. Although unpopular among Salzburgers, this appointment appeared at first to be to the Mozarts' advantage: Leopold's withheld salary was paid, and on 31 August Colloredo authorised the payment of Wolfgang's Konzertmeister salary. However, the new archbishop began to look for someone outside the Salzburg court to be his new Kapellmeister. Eventually, he chose the Italian Domenico Fischietti, who was several years younger than Leopold. Realising that his chances of promotion had probably been irrevocably lost, Leopold turned his hopes for a comfortable old age towards Wolfgang, giving new urgency to the third Italian journey which began in October 1772.

== Third journey, October 1772 – March 1773 ==
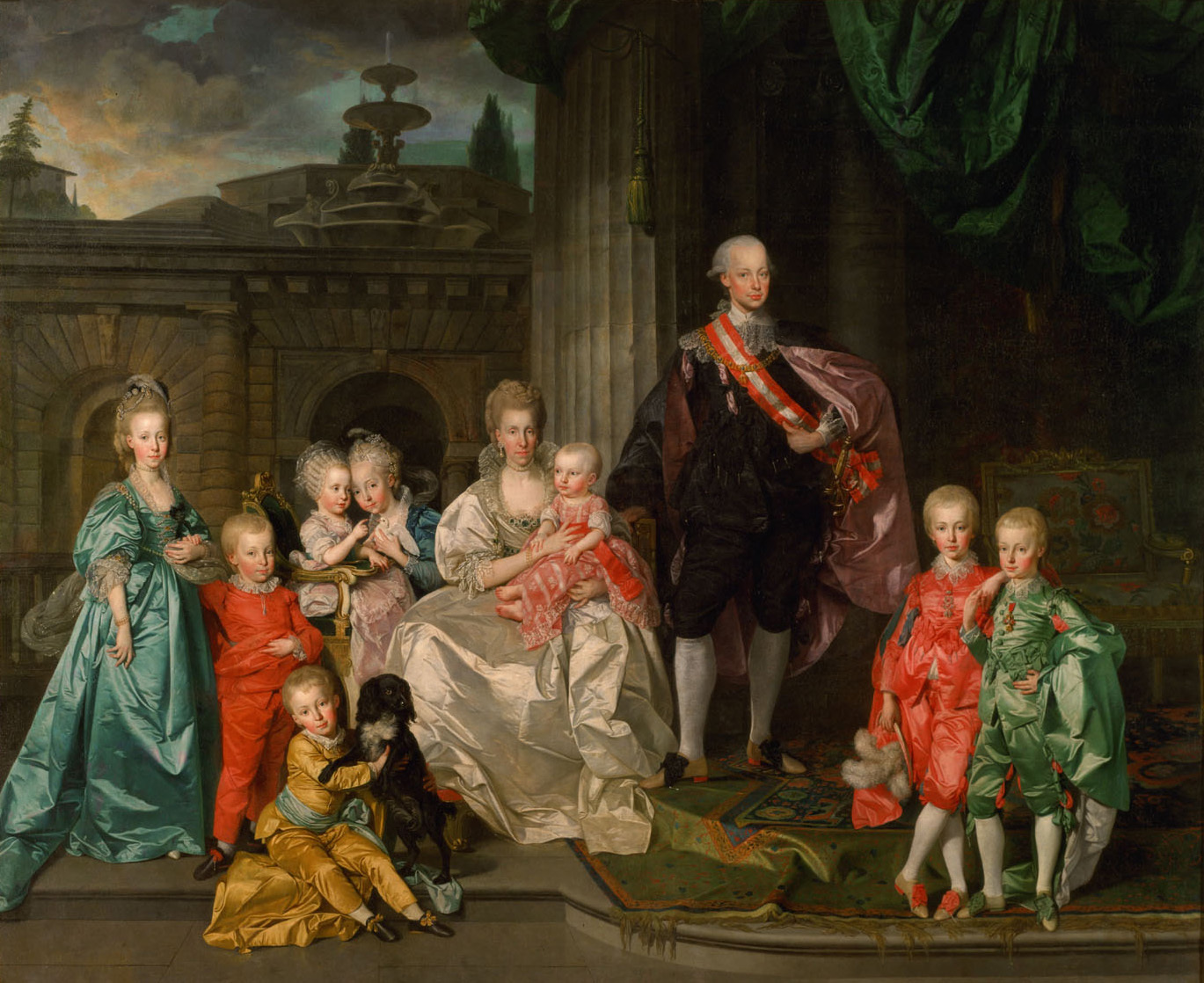
Leopold I, Grand Duke of Tuscany, with his family. The Grand Duke was Leopold's last hope of a royal appointment for Wolfgang.

In October 1772 Leopold and Wolfgang returned to Milan to work on the carnival opera that had been commissioned at the end of the first journey. The text was Lucio Silla, revised by Metastasio from an original by Giovanni de Gamerra. Wolfgang found himself in the familiar routine of composing rapidly while coping with problems such as the late arrival of singers and the withdrawal of the principal tenor due to illness. Leopold reported on 18 December that the tenor had arrived, that Wolfgang was composing his arias at breakneck speed, and that rehearsals were in full swing. The first performance, on 26 December, was chaotic: its start was delayed two hours by the late arrival of Archduke Ferdinand, there were quarrels among the principal performers, and the running time was extended by the insertion of ballets (a common practice of the time), so the performance was not over until two o'clock the following morning. Despite this, subsequent performances were well received. Leopold wrote on 9 January 1773 that the theatre was still full, and that the premiere of the season's second opera, Giovanni Paisiello's Sismano nel Mogul, had been postponed to allow Wolfgang's piece a longer run—26 performances in all. Such success for the new work seems to have been fleeting; but during the next few years the libretto was reset by several different composers, including Wolfgang's London mentor Johann Christian Bach.

Exsultate, jubilate
Performed by Michele Laporte (soprano) and Philippe Malgouyres (organ)

Leopold, unaware of the Empress's views, continued to pursue an appointment for Wolfgang by applying to Grand Duke Leopold I of Tuscany, the Empress's third son. The application was strongly supported by Count Firmian, and Leopold, in a coded letter home, said he was quite hopeful. While the Mozarts waited for a reply, Wolfgang composed a series of "Milanese" string quartets (K. 155/134a to K. 160/159a), and the famous motet Exsultate, jubilate, K. 165. Leopold resorted to deception to explain his extended stay in Milan, claiming to be suffering from severe rheumatism that prevented his travelling. His ciphered letters to his wife Anna Maria assure her that he is in fact well, but urge her to spread the story of his indisposition. He waited through most of January and all of February for the Grand Duke's reply. The negative response arrived on 27 February. It is not known whether the Grand Duke was influenced by his mother's opinion of the Mozart family, but his rejection effectively ended Leopold's hope of an Italian appointment for Wolfgang. The Mozarts had no choice now but to return to Salzburg, leaving Milan on 4 March and reaching home nine days later. Neither father nor son visited Italy again.

== Evaluation ==
Maynard Solomon summarises the Italian journeys as a great triumph, but suggests that from Leopold's standpoint they also incorporated a great failure. The Mozarts had certainly profited financially, and Wolfgang had developed artistically, into a recognised composer. Although the Mozarts' reception had not been uniformly cordial—they had been cold-shouldered by the Neapolitan court and the Prince of Thurn and Taxis had snubbed them—the Italians had generally responded with enthusiasm. Wolfgang had been received and knighted by the Pope; he had been granted membership in leading philharmonic societies and had studied with Italy's greatest music scholar, Giovanni Martini. Above all, he had been accepted as a practitioner of Italian opera by a leading opera house, completing three commissions that resulted in acclaimed performances. Other compositions resulted from the Italian experience, including a full-scale oratorio, several symphonies, string quartets, and numerous minor works.

The failure was Leopold's inability, despite his persistence, to secure a prestigious appointment either for himself or for Wolfgang. Leopold was evidently unaware of the negative light in which he was generally viewed; he did, however, perceive that there was some intangible barrier to his Italian ambitions, and eventually recognised that he could not overcome whatever forces were arrayed against him. In any event, Wolfgang's Italian triumphs proved short-lived; despite the critical and popular successes of his Milan operas, he was not invited to write another, and there were no further commissions from any of the other centres he had visited. With all hopes of an Italian court appointment gone, Leopold sought to secure the family's future by other means: "We shall not go under, for God shall help us. I have already thought out some plans."

Wolfgang was qualified by his skills at the keyboard and violin, and by his compositional experience, for a post as Kapellmeister; but at 17 he was too young. He therefore remained in Colloredo's employ at the Salzburg court, increasingly discontent, until his dismissal from the Archbishop's retinue during its stay in Vienna, in 1781. Leopold, unpromoted from his rank of vice-Kapellmeister, remained with the court until his death in 1787.

== See also ==
- List of operas by Mozart
- Mozart family grand tour

== Notes and references ==
=== Sources ===
- Blom, Eric (1935). Mozart. Master Musicians. London: J. M. Dent.
- Freeman, Daniel E. (2022). Josef Mysliveček, "Il Boemo" (2nd ed.). Minneapolis: Calumet Editions. ISBN 978-1-959770-16-9.
- Gutman, Robert W. (1999). Mozart: A Cultural Biography. San Diego: Harcourt. ISBN 0-15-601171-9.
- Halliwell, Ruth (1998). The Mozart Family: Four Lives in a Social Context. Oxford: Oxford University Press. ISBN 0-19-816371-1.
- Hildesheimer, Wolfgang (1985). Mozart. Translated by Marion Faber. London: J. M. Dent. ISBN 0-460-02401-9.
- Kenyon, Nicholas (2006). The Pegasus Pocket Guide to Mozart. New York: Pegasus Books. ISBN 1-933648-23-6.
- Osborne, Charles (1992). The Complete Operas of Mozart. London: Victor Gollancz. ISBN 0-575-03823-3.
- Roberts, John Morris (1980). The Pelican History of the World. London: Penguin Books. ISBN 0-14-022101-8.
- Rushton, Julian (2006). Mozart. New York: Oxford University Press. ISBN 0-19-518264-2.
- Sadie, Stanley (2006). Mozart: The Early Years, 1756–1781. New York: W.W. Norton & Co. ISBN 0-393-06112-4.
- Solomon, Maynard (1995). Mozart: A Life. London: Hutchinson. ISBN 0-09-174704-X.
- Zaslaw, Neal (1991). Mozart's Symphonies: Context, Performance Practice, Reception. Oxford: Clarendon Press. ISBN 0-19-816286-3.
