= Symphony No. 42 =

Symphony No. 42 may refer to:

- Symphony No. 42 (Haydn) in D major (Hoboken I/42) by Joseph Haydn, 1771
- Symphony No. 42 (Mozart) in F major (K. 75) by Wolfgang Amadeus Mozart, 1771
- Symphony No. 42 (film), a 2014 animated short film by Réka Bucsi
