= Symphony, K. Anh. C 11.04 =

1771 composition, uncertain author

The Symphony, K. Anh. C 11.04 "No. 56" in F major, K. 98, was once thought to have been written by Wolfgang Amadeus Mozart, but today is regarded as spurious. As of 2009, it is the only one of Mozart's symphonies published in the Alte Mozart-Ausgabe that has never been recorded. It is not included in the Neue Mozart-Ausgabe.

The duration is approximately 12–15 minutes.

== Music ==
The symphony is scored for two oboes, two horns and strings. In contemporary orchestras, it was also usual to include bassoons and harpsichord if they were available in the orchestra to reinforce the bass line and act as the continuo.

The symphony consists of the following movements:

1. Allegro, 4/4
2. Andante, 2/4
3. Menuetto, 3/4
4. Presto, 2/4

== History ==
In Vienna, an unknown person (possibly Franz Lorenz) compiled a Sistematisch-Thematisches Verzeichnis der sämtlichen Compositionen von Wolfgang Amadeus Mozart (Systematic thematic catalogue of all compositions by Wolfgang Amadeus Mozart). A pencil note "1771 Milan Nov" can be found for K. Anh. C 11.04. Ludwig Ritter von Köchel, who only knew the work in an arrangement for two pianos, considered the work authentic and included it into the first edition of the Köchel catalogue.

Wyzewa and Saint-Foix did not doubt the work's authenticity, but believed that Mozart only sketched the symphony and did not write it out completely. In his revision of Otto Jahn's Mozart biography, Hermann Abert stated that the symphony was probably doubtful, listing many things uncharacteristic of Mozart's works and characteristic of other Mannheim composers, even noting a favourite phrase of Johann Stamitz in the beginning of the trio of the minuet.

The symphony has been attributed to Joseph Haydn, Michael Haydn, and Leopold Mozart. Neal Zaslaw states that its authorship remains uncertain.

The Alte Mozart-Ausgabe (published 1879–1882) gives the numbering sequence 1–41 for the 41 numbered symphonies. The unnumbered symphonies (some, including K. Anh. C 11.04, published in supplements to the Alte-Mozart Ausgabe until 1910) are sometimes given numbers in the range 42 to 56, even though they were written earlier than Mozart's Symphony No. 41 (written in 1788). The symphony K. Anh. C 11.04 is given the number 56 in this numbering scheme.
