= Nancy November =

Professor of musicology in New Zealand

Nancy November FRSNZ

Academic background
- Education: Cornell University
- Thesis: Haydn's vocality and the ideal of “true” string quartets (2003)
- Doctoral advisor: Neal Zaslaw

Academic work
- Institutions: University of Auckland
- Main interests: 18th- and 19th-century chamber music socio-cultural context of music history pedagogy

Nancy Rachel November FRSNZ is a New Zealand academic, and is professor of musicology at the University of Auckland, specialising in late 18th- and 19th-century chamber music.

== Academic career ==
After a BSc in mathematics in 1994 and a Bachelor of Music with honours in musicology a year later, both from Victoria University of Wellington, November travelled to Cornell University to complete an MA in 1999 and a 2003 PhD titled Haydn's vocality and the ideal of “true” string quartets. November studied baroque violin with Peter Walls and received instruction from the New Zealand String Quartet. November moved to the University of Auckland, rising to full professor in 2022.

November is interested in the socio-cultural context of historical music. In 2020 November was awarded a Marsden grant to investigate the lives of 19th century amateur women musicians, playing scaled-down versions of orchestral pieces in the home. She has also published on cross-disciplinary history pedagogy.

November has been a Humboldt Fellow, and in 2020 was awarded a Humboldt Alumni Award for Innovative Networking Initiatives, for a project aimed at "advanc[ing] music history research from Australasian and East Asian perspectives and link[ing] it with German approaches with the aim of developing a cross-cultural musicology". In 2022 she became vice president of the New Zealand Association of von Humboldt Fellows. Also in 2022, she was elected a Fellow of the Royal Society of New Zealand.

== Selected works ==
Books

- November, Nancy (2021). Beethoven's String quartet in C-sharp minor, op. 131. New York City: Oxford University Press. ISBN 978-0-19-005922-4. OCLC 1226859257. Wikidata Q115490469.
- November, Nancy, ed. (2020). The Cambridge companion to the 'Eroica' symphony. Cambridge: Cambridge University Press. doi:10.1017/9781108524995. ISBN 978-1-108-42258-1. LCCN 2019050812. OCLC 1126383613. OL 28069114M. Wikidata Q115490473.
- November, Nancy, ed. (2022). String quartets in Beethoven's Europe. Brookline: Academic Studies Press. ISBN 978-1-64469-789-4. JSTOR 10.2307/j.ctv2fwfz7k. OCLC 1285370361. Wikidata Q115490471.
- November, Nancy (2013). Beethoven's theatrical quartets: opp. 59, 74, and 95. Cambridge: Cambridge University Press. ISBN 978-1-107-51676-2. OCLC 871257252. Wikidata Q115490474.
- November, Nancy (2021). Beethoven's symphonies arranged for the chamber: sociability, reception, and canon formation. Cambridge: Cambridge University Press. ISBN 978-1-108-92420-7. OCLC 1253101926. OL 34784173M. Wikidata Q115490477.
- November, Nancy (2017). Cultivating string quartets in Beethoven's Vienna. Woodbridge: Boydell Press. ISBN 978-1-78327-232-7. OCLC 972862981. OL 28635708M. Wikidata Q115490475.
- November, Nancy, ed. (2020). Performing history: approaches to history across musicology. Boston: Academic Studies Press. ISBN 978-1-64469-354-4. OCLC 1149161906. OL 28101112M. Wikidata Q115490476.

Scholarly articles

- November, Nancy (2020). "Academic Life in the Measured University: Pleasures, Paradoxes and Politics". Higher Education Research and Development. 39: 623. ISSN 0729-4360. OCLC 8805842645. Wikidata Q115490481.
- November, Nancy; Sturm, Sean Roderick; ’Ema Wolfgramm-Foliaki (2021). "Performing history: culturally sustaining pedagogies for indigenous students in the historical disciplines". Higher Education Research and Development. 40 (1): 104–116. doi:10.1080/07294360.2020.1852183. Wikidata Q113278871.
- November, Nancy (2010), Loops of literacy: promoting writing skills in large undergraduate classes through online group work (PDF), Wellington: Ako Aotearoa, OCLC 746499420, Wikidata Q115490478
- November, Nancy; Karen Day (2016). "Using Undergraduates' Digital Literacy Skills to Improve Their Discipline-Specific Writing: A Dialogue". International Journal for the Scholarship of Teaching and Learning. 6 (2). doi:10.20429/ijsotl.2012.060205. Wikidata Q113260895.
- November, Nancy; Phillippa McKeown-Green. "Creating and integrating video clips to develop music historical literacy skills". Fontes artis musicae. 66: 323. JSTOR 26871452. OCLC 8871006040. Wikidata Q115490480.
