= Symphony, K. 81 (Mozart) =

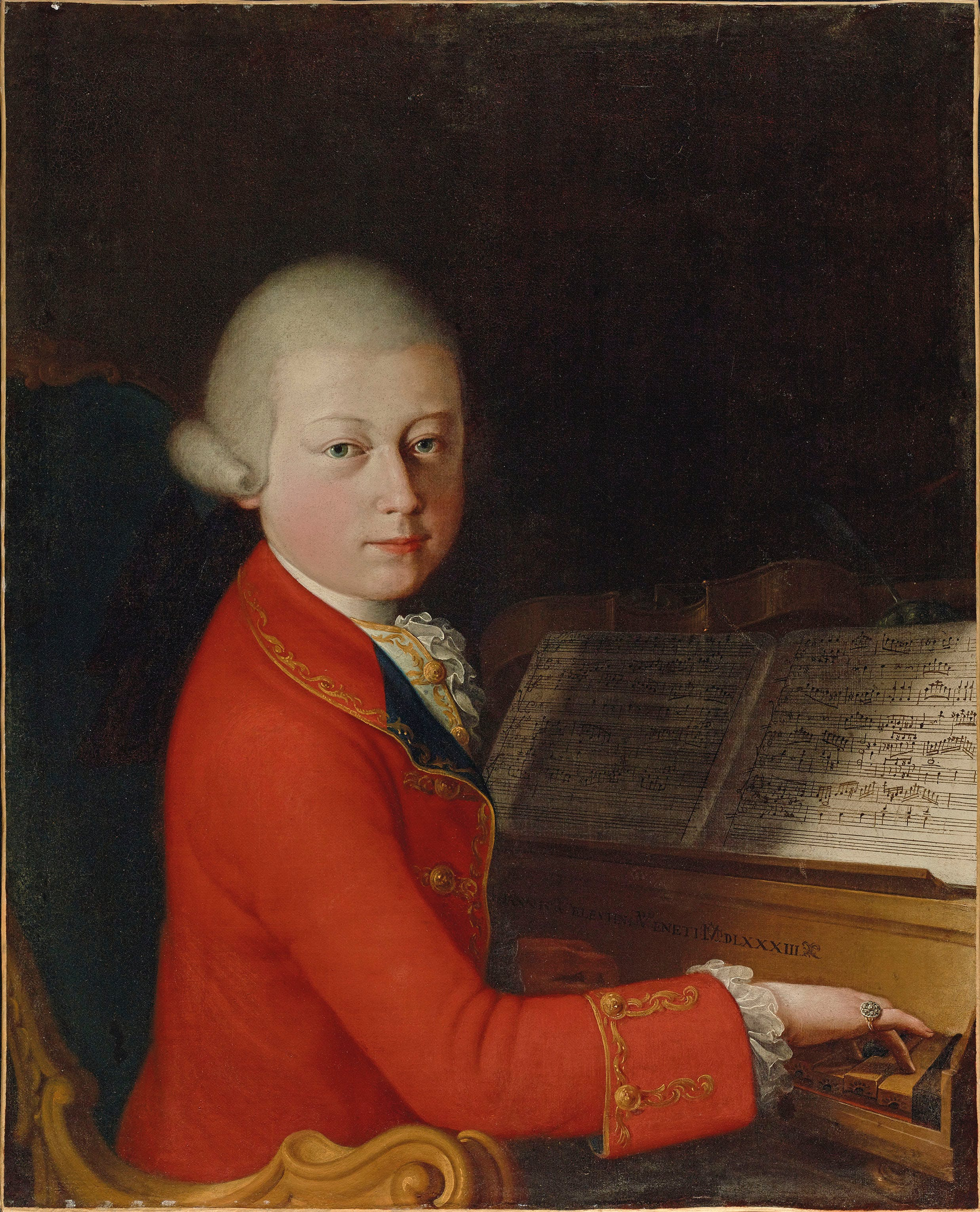
1770 Verona portrait of Mozart

The Symphony in D major "No. 44", K. 81/73l, may have been written by Wolfgang Amadeus Mozart in 1770 in Rome, although it has sometimes also been attributed to his father Leopold Mozart. It is now also catalogued as Eisen D 14 (LMV VII:D14) in Cliff Eisen's catalogue of Leopold Mozart's symphonies.

The symphony is scored for two oboes, two horns and strings. In contemporary orchestras, it was also usual to include bassoons and harpsichord if they were available in the orchestra to reinforce the bass line and act as the continuo. The horns are silent for the second movement. The duration is approximately 10 minutes.

The symphony consists of the following movements:

1. Allegro, 4/4
2. Andante, 2/4 G major
3. Allegro molto, 3/8

The form of the symphony is that of an Italian overture.

No autographs exist for Mozart's four D major symphonies written during his first trip to Italy (K. 81, K. 84, K. 95 and K. 97), and as such their authenticity is doubtful. A copy of K. 81, dated 25 April 1770, attributes the symphony to Wolfgang. A letter from 25 April 1770 from Mozart to his sister states that Leopold had copied one of his (Mozart's) symphonies so that the autograph could remain in the house. A catalogue of Breitkopf & Härtel lists Leopold as the composer, but the reason for this could be that Leopold, and not Wolfgang, presented the work to them.

In his edition of the Köchel catalogue, Alfred Einstein rejects the authorship of Leopold, stating that it would be strange if Leopold composed one of the most "charming and intelligent" of the Italian symphonies of 1770. However, in the similar case of the "Lambach" symphonies, the "more modern" "New Lambach" symphony turned out to be Leopold's work. Also, Neal Zaslaw disagrees with this viewpoint ("charming and intelligent") of K. 81, instead calling it "bright, superficial and conventional".

Bernhard Paumgartner assigned the symphony to Wolfgang, and stated (similarly to Wolfgang Gersthofer) that these four Italian symphonies are similar to each other, making it likely that they are all the work of the same composer, and that they are characteristic of Mozart's symphonies composed in Italy. Thus, they consider it very likely that Mozart was the author of all four symphonies.

The Alte Mozart-Ausgabe (published 1879–1882) gives the numbering sequence 1–41 for the 41 numbered symphonies. The unnumbered symphonies (some, including K. 81, published in supplements to the Alte-Mozart Ausgabe until 1910) are sometimes given numbers in the range 42 to 56, even though they were written earlier than Mozart's Symphony No. 41 (written in 1788). The symphony K. 81 is given the number 44 in this numbering scheme.
