= Symphony, K. 97 (Mozart) =

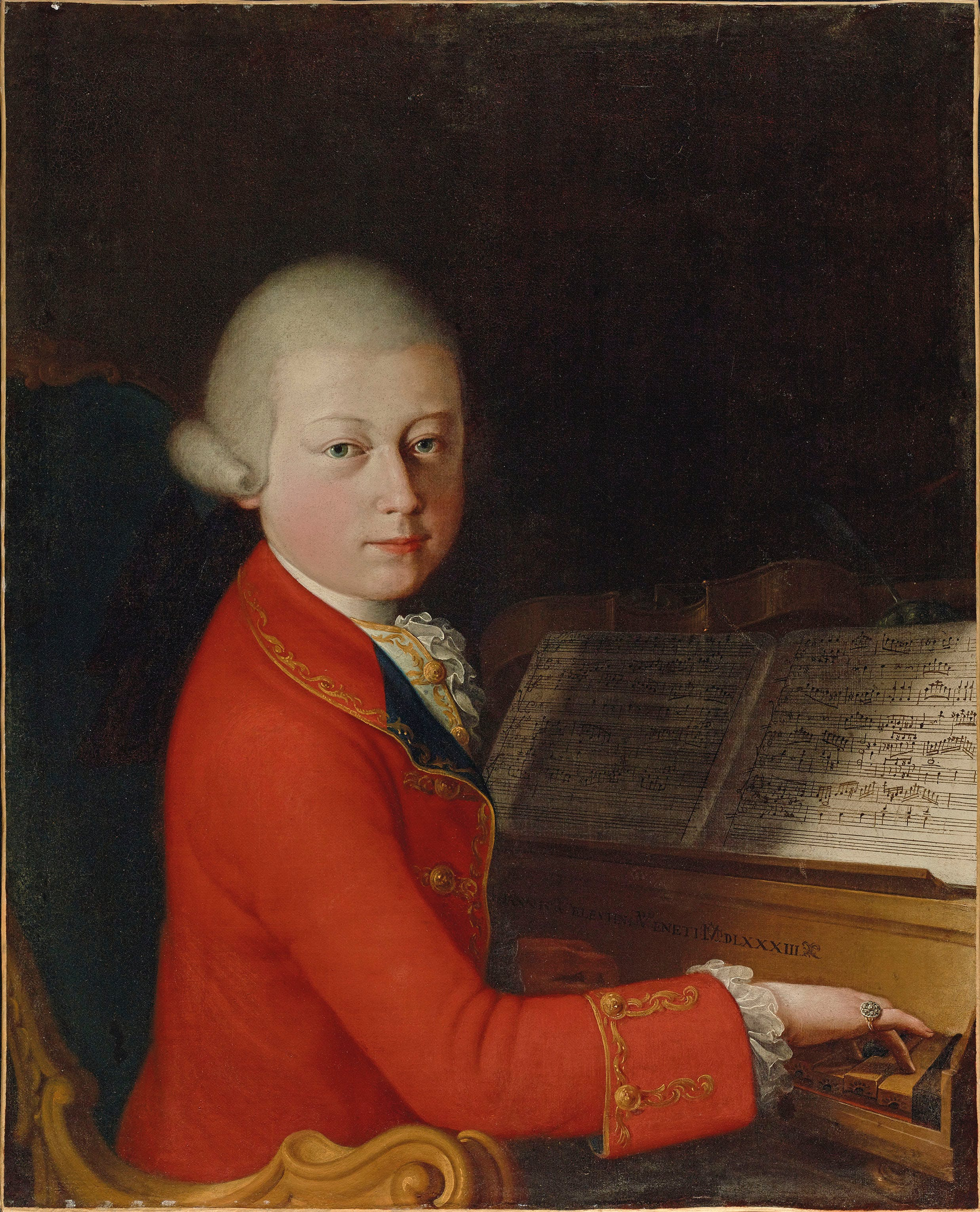
1770 Verona portrait of Mozart

The Symphony in D major "No. 47", K. 97/73m, was probably written by Wolfgang Amadeus Mozart in 1770 in Rome.

== Structure ==
The symphony is scored for two oboes, two French horns, two trumpets and strings. In contemporary orchestras, it was also usual to include bassoons and harpsichord if they were available in the orchestra to reinforce the bass line and act as the continuo. The trumpets are silent in the second movement, in which the oboes are replaced by flutes. The duration is approximately 11 minutes.

The symphony consists of the following movements:

1. Allegro, 4/4
2. Andante, 2/4
3. Menuetto, 3/4
4. Presto, 3/8

== History ==
Mozart mentioned two symphonies in a letter to his sister on 25 April 1770. In his revision of the Köchel catalogue, Alfred Einstein states his opinion that these symphonies are likely to be K. 95 and K. 97, which could be "twin symphonies" due to similarities in style and structure. This view, however, is disputed by other authors, including Neal Zaslaw, as the autographs have not survived for either symphony.

For two other D major symphonies from Mozart's first Italian trip, K. 81 and K. 84, the authenticity is clearer. Gersthofer, based on other works definitely by Mozart from this time period, considers Mozart's authorship for K. 81, K. 84, K. 95 and K. 97 "very likely".

Whether the K. 95 and K. 97 symphonies were originally planned in four movements or had the minuets added later is unclear.

The Alte Mozart-Ausgabe (published 1879–1882) gives the numbering sequence 1–41 for the 41 numbered symphonies. The unnumbered symphonies (some, including K. 97, published in supplements to the Alte-Mozart Ausgabe until 1910) are sometimes given numbers in the range 42 to 56, even though they were written earlier than Mozart's Symphony No. 41 (written in 1788). The symphony K. 97 is given the number 47 in this numbering scheme.
