= Symphony, K. 75 (Mozart) =

1771 symphony by W. A. Mozart

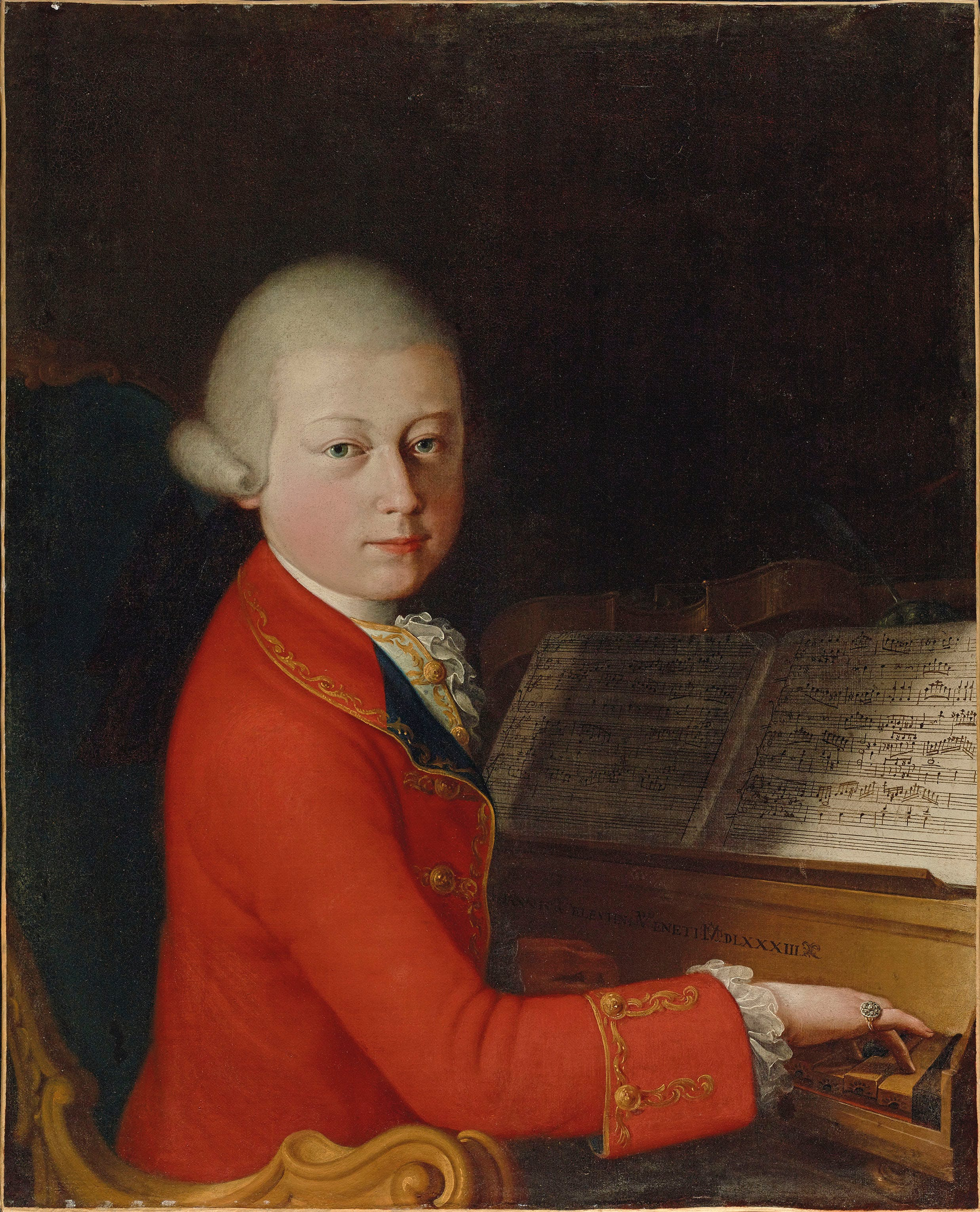
1770 Verona portrait of Mozart

The Symphony in F major "No. 42", K. 75, was written by Wolfgang Amadeus Mozart probably around March to August 1771 in Salzburg.

The symphony is scored for two oboes, two horns in F (only in first and last movement) and strings. In Mozart's time, it was usual to include also bassoons and harpsichord if they were available to reinforce the bass line and act as the continuo. The duration is approximately 13 minutes.

The symphony consists of the following movements:

1. Allegro, 3/4
2. Menuetto, 3/4
3. Andantino, 2/4 in B-flat major
4. Allegro, 3/8

Unusually, the minuet and trio is the second rather than the usual third movement.

Like other works from this time period, such as the K. 97 symphony, the autograph, which was in the possession of Breitkopf & Härtel, was destroyed during World War II. Mozart's authorship therefore remains uncertain. Most professionals consider the work authentic.

The Alte Mozart-Ausgabe (published 1879–82) gives the numbering sequence 1–41 for the 41 numbered symphonies. The unnumbered symphonies (some, including K. 75, published in supplements to the Alte Mozart-Ausgabe until 1910) are sometimes given numbers in the range 42 to 56, even though they were written earlier than Mozart's Symphony No. 41 (written in 1788). The symphony K. 75 is given the number 42 in this numbering scheme.
