= Ludwig Ritter von Köchel =

Austrian musicologist and writer (1800–1877)

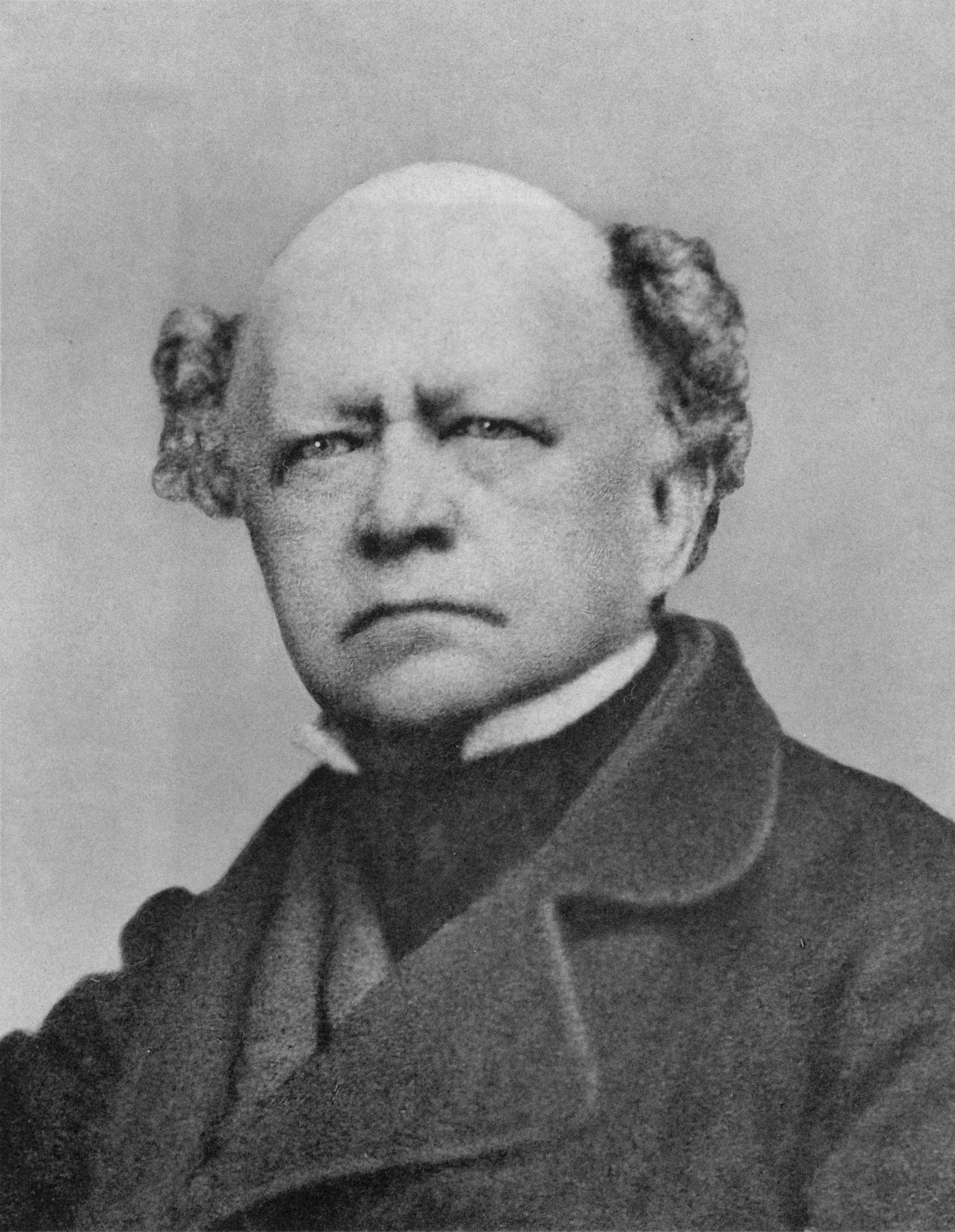
- Portrait of Ludwig Ritter von Köchel, 1882
- Born: Ludwig Alois Friedrich Köchel; 14 January 1800; Stein, Lower Austria, Austria
- Died: 3 June 1877 (aged 77); Vienna, Austria-Hungary
- Occupations: Musicologist; writer; composer; botanist; publisher
- Known for: Köchel catalogue

Signature
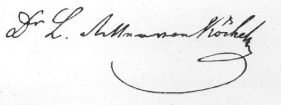

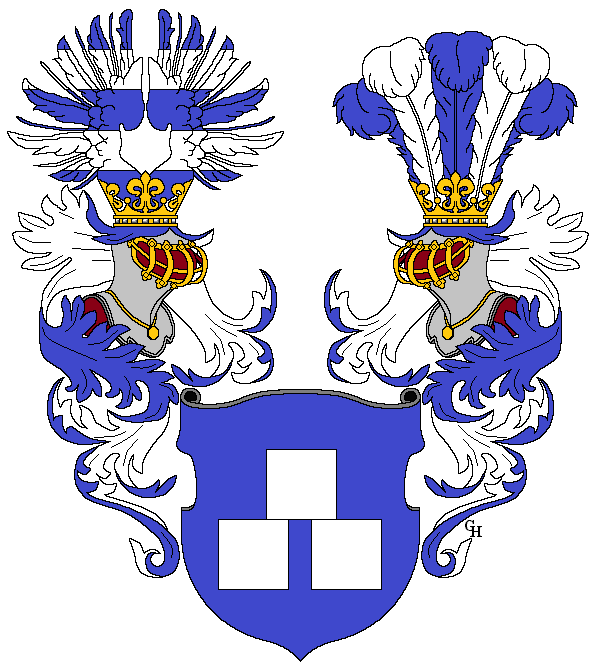
Köchel's arms as Ritter, 1842

Ludwig Ritter von Köchel (German: [ˈkœçəl]; born Ludwig Alois Friedrich Köchel; 14 January 1800 – 3 June 1877) was an Austrian musicologist, writer, composer, botanist, and publisher. He is best known for cataloguing the works of Mozart and originating the 'KV-numbers' by which they are known (KV for Köchel-Verzeichnis).

== Life ==
Ludwig Alois Friedrich Köchel was born in the town of Stein, Lower Austria. He studied law in Vienna and graduated with a PhD in 1827. For fifteen years, he was tutor to the four sons of Archduke Charles of Austria. Köchel was rewarded with a knighthood and a generous financial settlement, permitting him to spend the rest of his life as a private scholar. Contemporary scientists were greatly impressed by his botanical researches in North Africa, the Iberian Peninsula, the United Kingdom, the North Cape, and Russia. In addition to botany, he was interested in geology and mineralogy, but also loved music, and was a member of the Mozarteum Salzburg. He died of cancer at age 77 in Vienna.

== Köchel catalogue ==
In 1862 he published the Köchel catalogue, a chronological and thematic register of the works of Mozart. This catalogue was the first on such a scale and with such a level of scholarship behind it; it has since undergone revisions. Mozart's works are often referred to by their KV-numbers (cf. opus number); for example, the "Jupiter" symphony, Symphony No. 41, KV. 551. At the same time that Köchel was writing his catalogue Otto Jahn was making a comprehensive collection of Mozart works and writing a scholarly biography of Mozart. When Jahn learned of Köchel's work he turned over his collection to him. Köchel dedicated his catalogue to Jahn.

== Other works ==
Moreover, Köchel arranged Mozart's works into twenty-four categories, which were used by Breitkopf & Härtel when they published the first complete edition of Mozart's works from 1877 to 1910, a venture partly funded by Köchel.

He also catalogued the works of Johann Fux.
