= Symphony, K. 96 (Mozart) =

1771 composition by W. A. Mozart

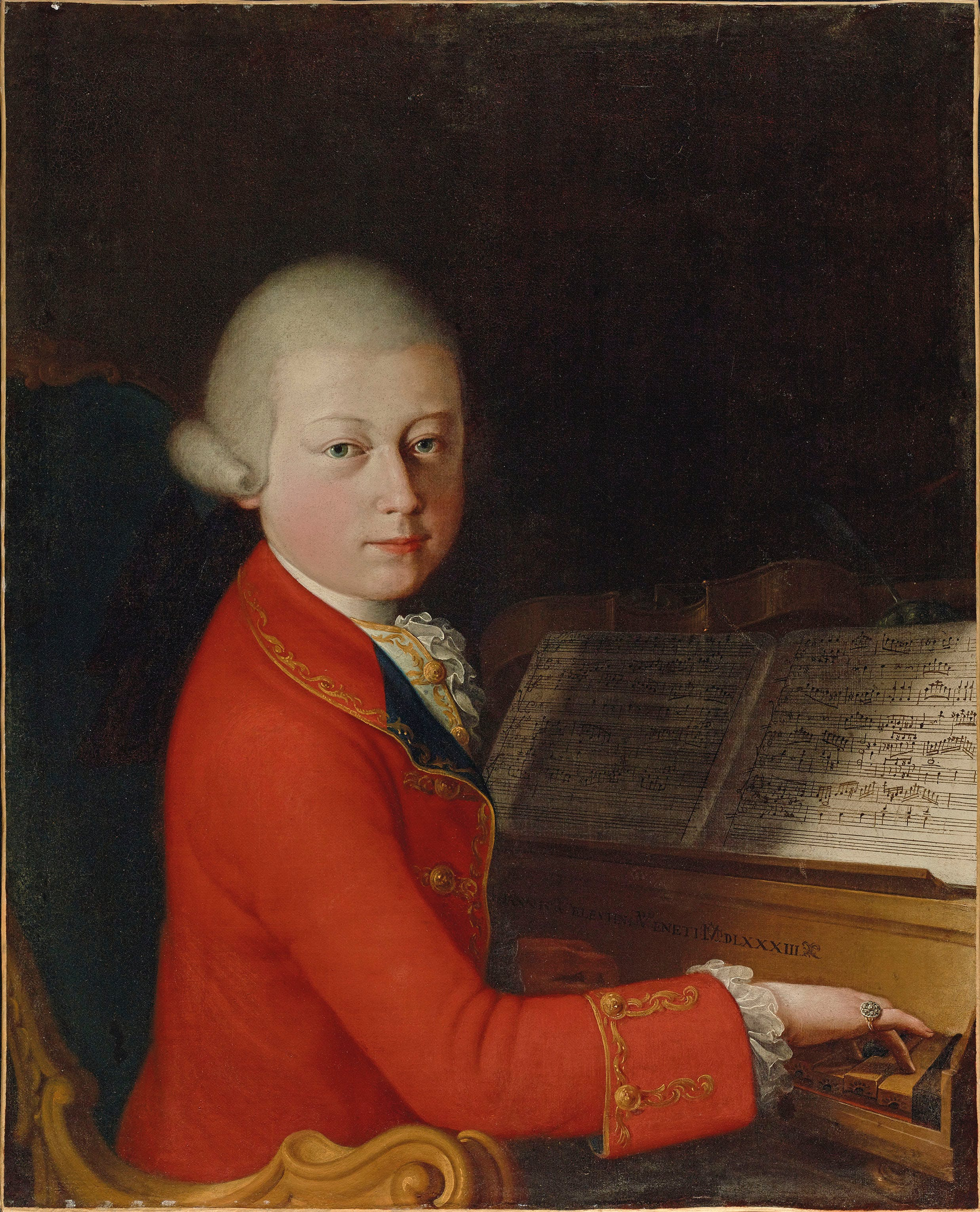
1770 Verona portrait of Mozart

The Symphony, K. 96 "No. 46" in C major, K. 96/111b, was written by Wolfgang Amadeus Mozart probably in 1771 in Milan.

The symphony is scored for two oboes, two horns in C, two trumpets in C, timpani and strings. In contemporary orchestras, it was also usual to include bassoons and harpsichord if they were available in the orchestra to reinforce the bass line and act as the continuo. The duration is approximately 15 minutes.

The symphony consists of the following movements:

1. Allegro, 4/4
2. Andante, 6/8
3. Menuetto, 3/4
4. Molto allegro, 2/4

Alfred Einstein suggested in his revision of the Köchel catalogue that the symphony was composed in October–November 1771 in Milan, and that the minuet was added later. The authenticity of this symphony is uncertain as the autograph is lost; the dates given to this symphony vary considerably, from 1770 to 1775.

The Alte Mozart-Ausgabe (published 1879–1882) gives the numbering sequence 1–41 for the 41 numbered symphonies. The unnumbered symphonies (some, including K. 96, published in supplements to the Alte-Mozart Ausgabe until 1910) are sometimes given numbers in the range 42 to 56, even though they were written earlier than Mozart's Symphony No. 41 (written in 1788). The symphony K. 96 is given the number 46 in this numbering scheme.
