= Symphony No. 11 (Mozart) =

1770 composition by W. A. Mozart

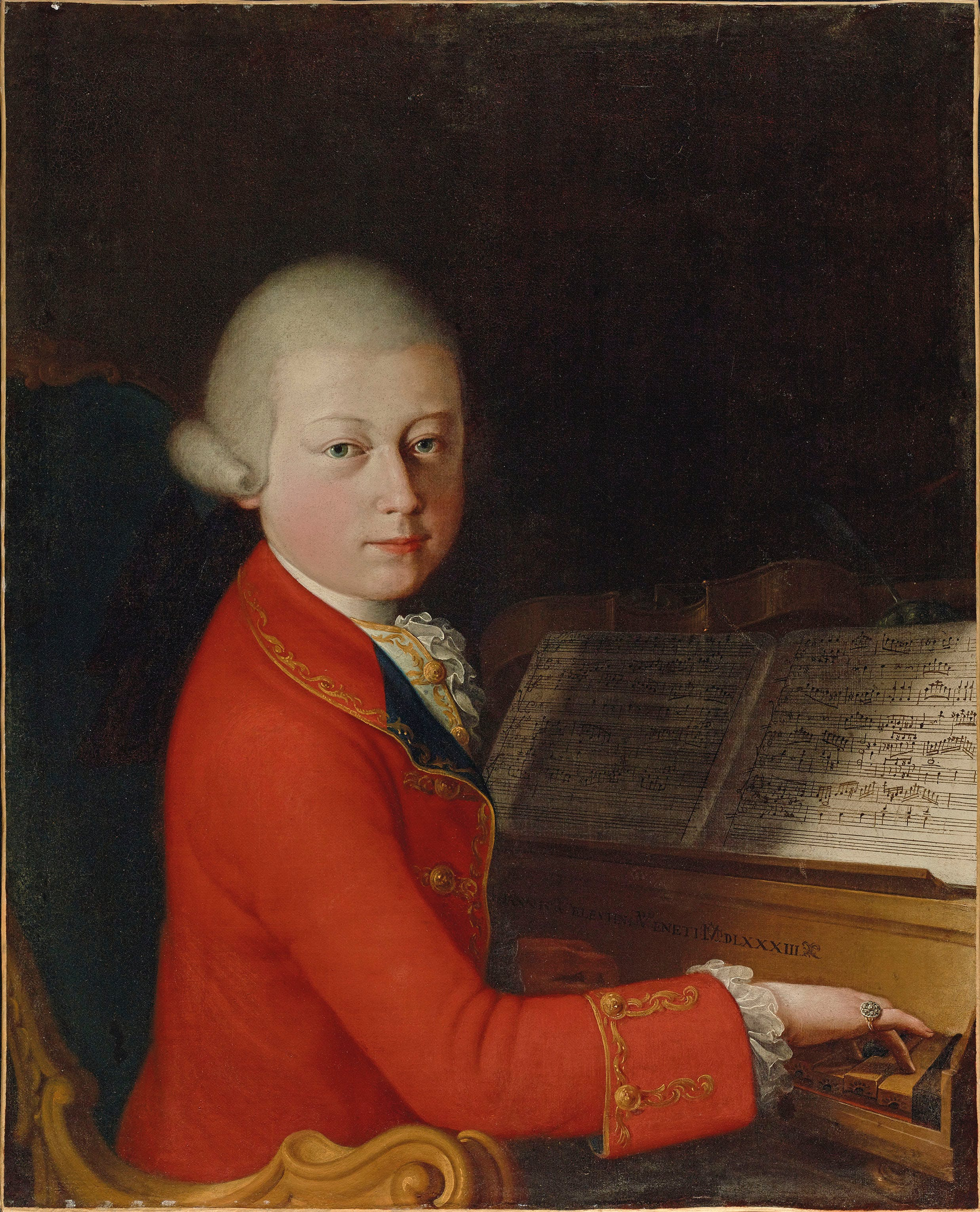
1770 Verona portrait of Mozart

Symphony No. 11 in D major, K. 84/73q, was at one time considered unquestionably to be the work of Wolfgang Amadeus Mozart. The symphony's status has, however, been challenged, and remains uncertain. It is believed to date from 1770, and may have been written in Milan or Bologna, if it is a genuine Mozart work.

An early manuscript from Vienna attributes the work to Wolfgang, but nineteenth-century copies of the score attribute it respectively to Leopold Mozart and to Carl Dittersdorf. Neal Zaslaw writes: "A comparison of the results of two stylistic analyses of the work's first movement with analyses of unquestionably genuine first movements of the period by the three composers suggests that Wolfgang is the most likely of the three to have been the composer of K73q."

Kenyon opines that there is "little special" about the work, while Zaslaw finds a "Gluckish ambience", and some affinity with opera buffa in the repeated triplets found in the finale.

== Music ==
The work is scored for two oboes, two horns in D, and strings.

The symphony is in three movements, lacking a minuet and trio.

1. Allegro, 4/4
2. Andante, 3/8
3. Allegro, 2/4

The first movement is also employed as the first movement of the Musik zu einer Pantomime: Pantalon und Colombine (Music to a Pantomime) in D major, K. 446/416d (1783, incomplete) in the completion and orchestration by Franz Beyer (recorded by Sir Neville Marriner and the Academy of St Martin in the Fields for The Complete Mozart Edition).
