= Neal Zaslaw =

American musicologist

- Born: June 28, 1939 (age 87); New York City, US
- Education: Harvard University (BA); Juilliard School (MA); Columbia University (PhD)
- Occupation: Musicologist

Neal Zaslaw (born June 28, 1939) is an American musicologist.

== Life and career ==
Born on June 28, 1939 in New York, Zaslaw graduated from Harvard in 1961 with a BA and obtained his master's from Juilliard in 1963. He played flute in the American Symphony Orchestra under Leopold Stokowski from 1962 to 1965, when he returned to graduate coursework at Columbia University. Zaslaw began teaching at CUNY in 1968 and taught there for two years. While pursuing graduate studies at Columbia, (Note: Lippman's obituary indicates he taught at Columbia.) he took a seminar in historiography with Edward Lippmann. He obtained his PhD from Columbia University in 1970 and joined the faculty at Cornell University that same year. Zaslaw was named the Herbert Gussman Professor of Music at Cornell in 1995. He served as the musicological advisor to Christopher Hogwood, Jaap Schroeder, and the Academy of Ancient Music for their Mozart symphony recordings from 1977 to 1981. Zaslaw also was the editor-in-chief of the journal Current Musicology from 1967–1970 and was the book review editor for Notes: The Quarterly Journal of the Music Library Association.

Zaslaw's early work dealt with performance practice, especially tempo and ornamentation with respect to French and Italian styles. His PhD dissertation was on Jean-Marie Leclair l'aîné. Zaslaw has done extended work on the works of Wolfgang Amadeus Mozart, including a landmark 1989 work on his symphonies. In 1993, he was named the principal editor of the revised Köchel catalogue. This revised edition, the ninth edition of the Köchel, was published in 2024.

Zaslaw was awarded the Austrian Cross of Honour for Science and Art, First Class in 1991. In 1998, he was made a Fellow of the American Academy of Arts and Sciences. Zaslaw has also held grants and fellowships from the American Council of Learned Societies, the French Ministry of Culture, the Martha Baird Rockefeller Fund for Music, and the National Endowment for the Humanities.

== Selected works ==
=== Books ===
- Vinquist, Mary; Zaslaw, Neal (1971). Performance Practice: A Bibliography. New York: W.W. Norton. ISBN 9780393021486. OCLC 207828.
- Zaslaw, Neal, ed. (1989). The Classical Era: From the 1740s to the End of the 18th Century. London: Macmillan. ISBN 9780333472606. OCLC 19519079.
- Zaslaw, Neal (1989). Mozart's Symphonies: Context, Performance Practice, Reception. Oxford: Clarendon Press. ISBN 9780193152403. OCLC 18105481.
- Zaslaw, Neal; Cowdery, William, eds. (1990). The Compleat Mozart: A Guide to the Musical Works of Wolfgang Amadeus Mozart. New York: Norton. ISBN 9780393028867. OCLC 21043098.
- Zaslaw, Neal; Fein, Fiona Morgan (1991). The Mozart Repertory: A Guide for Musicians, Programmers, and Researchers. Ithaca: Cornell University Press. ISBN 9780801499371. OCLC 23767493.
- Zaslaw, Neal (1991). W. A. Mozart: Portfolio of a Genius. West Stockbridge, MA: Thornwillow Press. OCLC 25407300.
- Zaslaw, Neal, ed. (1996). Mozart's Piano Concertos: Text, Context, Interpretation. Ann Arbor: University of Michigan Press. ISBN 9780472103140. OCLC 34076872.
- Spitzer, John; Zaslaw, Neal (2004). The Birth of the Orchestra: History of an Institution, 1650-1815. Oxford: Oxford University Press. ISBN 9780198164340. OCLC 52485404.
- Köchel, Ludwig. Zaslaw, Neal (ed.). Köchel-Verzeichnis (KV): Thematisches Verzeichnis der musikalischen Werke von Wolfgang Amadé Mozart (in German). Translated by Leisinger, Ulrich. Wiesbaden: Breitkopf & Härtel. ISBN 9783765103001. OCLC 1459744626.

=== Dissertation ===
- Zaslaw, Neal (1970). Materials for the Life and Works of Jean-Marie Leclair l'aîné (Ph.D. thesis). New York: Columbia University. OCLC 4117753.

=== Scholarly articles ===
- Zaslaw, Neal (1994). "Mozart As a Working Stiff". In Morris, James M. (ed.). On Mozart. New York: Cambridge University Press.

=== Journal articles ===
- Zaslaw, Neal (1971). "Music Curricula in the '70s". College Music Symposium. 11: 108–111 – via JSTOR.
- Zaslaw, Neal (1974). "The Enigma of the Haute-Contre". The Musical Times. 115 (1581): 939–941 – via JSTOR.
- Zaslaw, Neal; Sheridan, Nancy (1975). "The Unmusical English". The Musical Times. 116 (1592): 877 – via JSTOR.
- Zaslaw, Neal (1976). "Towards the Revival of the Classical Orchestra". Journal of the Royal Musical Association. 103: 158–187 – via JSTOR.
- Zaslaw, Neal (1977). "An English 'Orpheus and Euridice' of 1697'". The Musical Times. 118 (1616): 805–808 – via JSTOR.
- Zaslaw, Neal (1978). "Mozart's Paris Symphonies". The Musical Times. 119 (1627): 753–757 – via JSTOR.
- Zaslaw, Neal (1979). "[Introduction]: The Compleat Orchestral Musician". Early Music. 7 (1): 46–47 – via JSTOR.
- Zaslaw, Neal (1979). "Leclair's 'Scylla et Glaucus'". The Musical Times. 120 (1641): 900–904 – via JSTOR.
- Sadler, Graham; Zaslaw, Neal (1980). "Notes on Leclair's Theatre Music". Music & Letters. 61 (2): 147–157 – via JSTOR.
- Zaslaw, Neal (1982). "Mozart, Haydn and the Sinfonia da Chiesa". The Journal of Musicology. 1 (1): 95–124 – via JSTOR.
- Zaslaw, Neal (1983). "The New Rameau Edition". The Musical Times. 124 (1679): 28–30 – via JSTOR.
- Zaslaw, Neal (1983). "At the Paris Opéra in 1747". Early Music. 11 (4): 515–516 – via JSTOR.
- Zaslaw, Neal; Eisen, Cliff (1985). "Signor Mozart's Symphony in a Minor, K. Anhang 220 = 16a". The Journal of Musicology. 4 (2): 191–206 – via JSTOR.
- Spitzer, John; Zaslaw, Neal (1986). "Improvised Ornamentation in Eighteenth-Century Orchestras". Journal of the American Musicological Society. 39 (3): 524–577 – via JSTOR.
- Zaslaw, Neal (1988). "When Is an Orchesta Not an Orchestra?". Early Music. 16 (4): 483–495 – via JSTOR.
- Zaslaw, Neal (1990). "The Italian Violin School in the 17th Century". Early Music. 18 (4): 515–518 – via JSTOR.
- Zaslaw, Neal (1992). "Mozart's Orchestras: Applying Historical Knowledge to Modern Performances". Early Music. 20 (2): 197–205 – via JSTOR.
- Zaslaw, Neal (1992). ""Scylla et Glaucus": A Case Study". Cambridge Opera Journal. 4 (3): 199–228 – via JSTOR.
- Zaslaw, Neal (1996). "Ornaments for Corelli's Violin Sonatas, Op. 5". Early Music. 24 (1): 95–116 – via JSTOR.
- Zaslaw, Neal (1997). "In vino veritas". Early Music. 25 (4): 568–569 – via JSTOR.
- Zaslaw, Neal (2001). "Reflections on 50 Years of Early Music". Early Music. 29 (1): 5–12 – via JSTOR.

== Students ==
- Nancy November – Professor of musicology in New Zealand
