= Alte Mozart-Ausgabe =

First complete edition of the music of Mozart

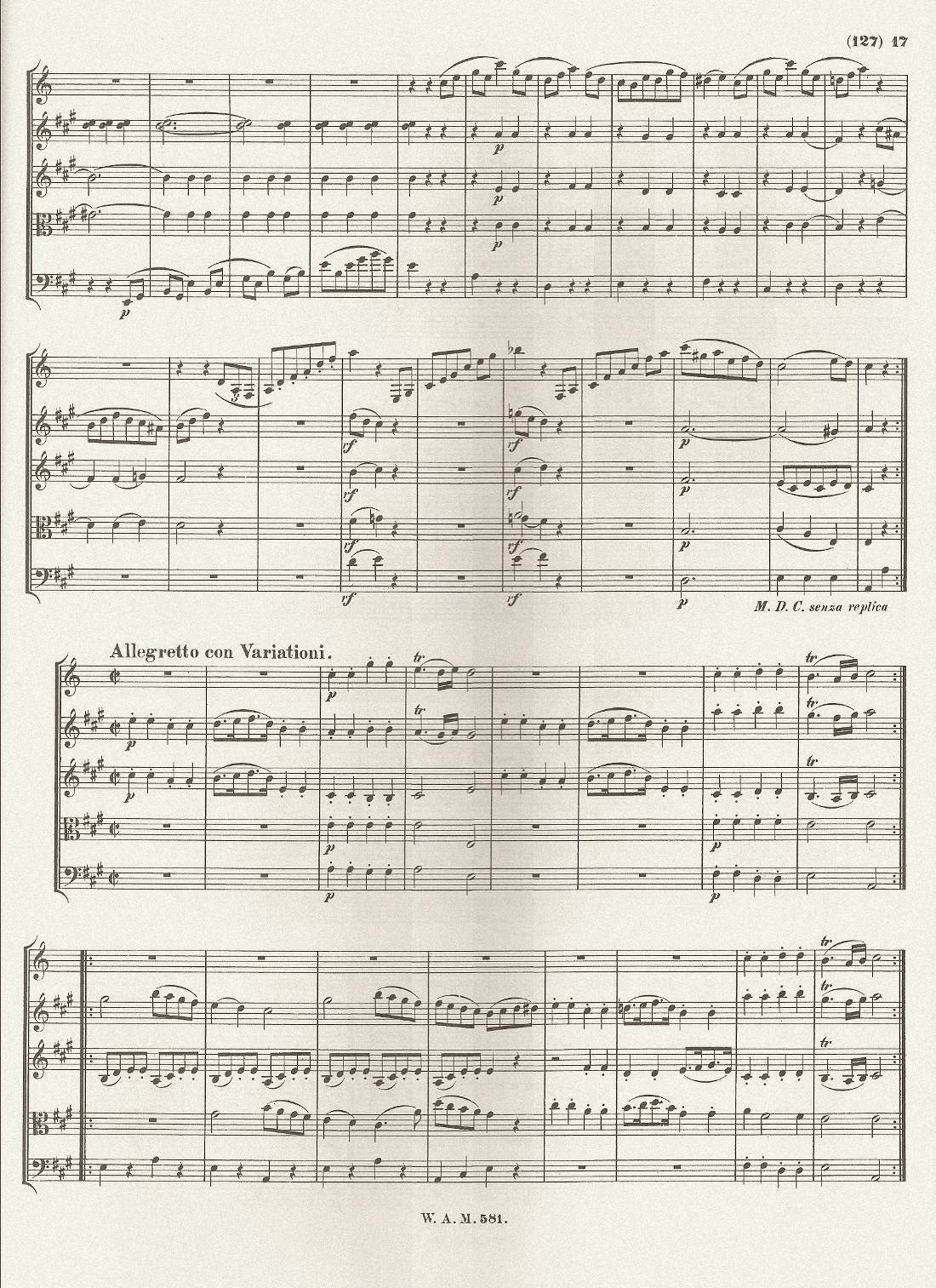
A page from the Alte Mozart-Ausgabe, showing a portion of the Clarinet Quintet, K. 581.

The Alte Mozart-Ausgabe is the name by which the first complete edition of the music of Wolfgang Amadeus Mozart, is known. It was published by Breitkopf & Härtel from January 1877 to December 1883, with supplements published until 1910. The name Alte Mozart-Ausgabe (abbreviated "AMA") is actually a modern invention to distinguish the edition from the second Mozart complete works edition, the Neue Mozart-Ausgabe; the publication title of Breitkopf & Härtel's edition was Wolfgang Amadeus Mozarts Werke. Kritisch durchgesehene Gesammtausgabe. (It is therefore sometimes referred to as the "Mozart Gesammtausgabe".)

One of the guiding lights of the AMA was Ludwig Ritter von Köchel, compiler of the still-standard Köchel-Verzeichnis (thematic catalog) of Mozart's works. From behind the scenes, Köchel worked to have the edition completed, lending valuable scores to the publisher and editors for their work. Among those involved in the actual editing were Johannes Brahms, Joseph Joachim, Carl Reinecke, Julius Rietz, and Philipp Spitta (the noted biographer of Johann Sebastian Bach).

While a notable achievement for its time, the AMA suffered from serious limitations. Frederick Neumann remarks that it "varies greatly in dependability, with some volumes remarkably trustworthy, others far less so". Alfred Einstein expressed dissatisfaction with its presentation of Mozart's "Coronation" Concerto and Marriage of Figaro, and Friedrich Blume was particularly severe on what he called the "astonishing frivolity and often complete irresponsibility" of the editors of this edition (specifically with regard to the handling of Mozart's piano concertos), asserting that "the Collected Edition [i.e., the AMA] of Mozart's works and the practical editions based on it offer no more than the skeleton of his compositions."

There are also certain authentic works of Mozart that were never published in this edition, some because they were not discovered until well after its completion (for instance, the Symphony in F, K. 19a, rediscovered in 1981), as well as a number of works once incorrectly attributed to Mozart which are now known to be doubtful or spurious (for instance, the piece published in AMA as Mozart's Symphony No. 2 in B flat, K. 17, now considered to be by Leopold Mozart).

Therefore, the AMA is no longer regarded as the definitive edition of Mozart's works, and it has been supplanted in this regard by the Neue Mozart-Ausgabe for serious study of the composer's output. However, reprints of portions of the AMA remain widely available from Dover Publications and other firms that specialize in republishing older editions. Parts of this edition are also sometimes encountered in electronic format from various websites that offer online sheet music.

Archival materials of the AMA belong to the fonds 21081 Breitkopf & Härtel, Leipzig, in the Sächsisches Staatsarchiv, Staatsarchiv Leipzig, first of all engraver's models and proof prints, partly correspondence with editors.
