= List of symphonies by Wolfgang Amadeus Mozart =

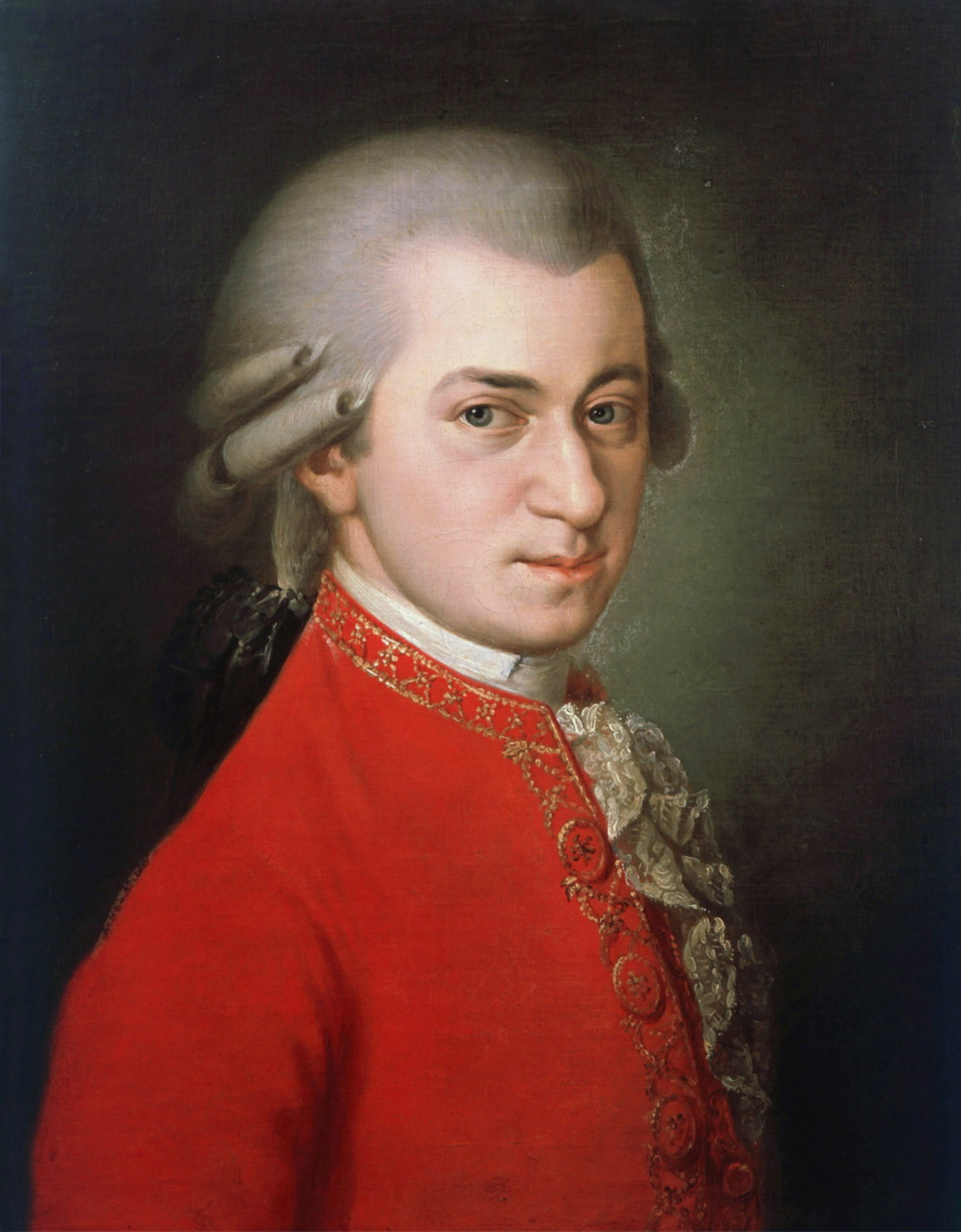
Krafft's posthumous 1819 Mozart portrait

This is a list of symphonies by Wolfgang Amadeus Mozart. Symphonies No. 2 (attributed to Leopold Mozart) and 3 (written by Carl Friedrich Abel) are spurious. Mozart's "37th symphony" is actually Michael Haydn's 25th symphony; Mozart only added a 20-bar slow introduction to it. Some symphonies of doubtful authenticity were included in either the Alte Mozart-Ausgabe or the Neue Mozart-Ausgabe; they are in this list but marked as doubtful or spurious (in the cases of Symphony, K. 16a and K. 98, which later scholarship demonstrated have nothing to do with Mozart). No. 11 (K. 84/73q) is considered by scholars to be of doubtful authenticity. Further spurious and doubtful symphonies can be found at Mozart symphonies of spurious or doubtful authenticity.

The symphonies K. 19b, 66c, 66d, 66e, Anh.C 11.07, and Anh.C 11.08 are lost, and it is uncertain whether they are Mozart's work: they have not been included in the list below.

The symphony numbers in the range 42 to 56 are sometimes used for symphonic works that were not numbered in the 1-41 sequence. They have been included for completeness, although they are out of chronological sequence. In addition, some authentic symphonies were never given numbers. The symphonies in the 1-41 chronological sequence have been listed first; the symphonies that were given the numbers 42-56 are listed next; and lastly are listed the remaining symphonies. The symphonies given numbers past 41 are sometimes listed with "GA" preceding the number, because these numbers were from the Alte Mozart-Ausgabe, the full name of which was the "Wolfgang Amadeus Mozarts Werke: Kritisch durchgesehene Gesamtausgabe". There are no symphonies "GA 49" and "GA 53".

Links to scores of each symphony have been included. All the symphonies in this table except Nos. 2, 3 and 37 (which are spurious) have links to scores in the Neue Mozart-Ausgabe; the spurious symphonies Nos. 2, 3 and 37 have links to scores at the International Music Score Library Project.

== List of symphonies ==
: Outside of original 41

K^{1}	K^{6}	Title	Key	Approx. performance time	Composed	Incipit
16	16	Symphony No. 1	E♭ major	11:09	1764–5 London	Symphony No. 1: Score and critical report (in German) in the Neue Mozart-Ausgabe
Symphony No. 2 is considered spurious
Symphony No. 3 is considered spurious
19	19	Symphony No. 4	D major	10:40	1765 London	Symphony No. 4: Score and critical report (in German) in the Neue Mozart-Ausgabe
Anh. 223	19a	Symphony, K. 19a	F major		1765 London	Symphony, K. 19a: Score and critical report (in German) in the Neue Mozart-Ausgabe
22	22	Symphony No. 5	B♭ major	07:10	1765 December The Hague	Symphony No. 5: Score and critical report (in German) in the Neue Mozart-Ausgabe
Anh. 221	45a	"Old Lambach"	G major		1766 The Hague	Symphony, K. 45a (1st version): Score and critical report (in German) in the Neue Mozart-Ausgabe; Symphony, K. 45a (2nd version): Score and critical report (in German) in the Neue Mozart-Ausgabe
43	43	Symphony No. 6	F major	14:16	1767 Vienna/Olomouc	Symphony No. 6: Score and critical report (in German) in the Neue Mozart-Ausgabe
45	45	Symphony No. 7	D major	11:08	1768 Vienna January 16	Symphony No. 7: Score and critical report (in German) in the Neue Mozart-Ausgabe
48	48	Symphony No. 8	D major	12:01	1768 Vienna December 13	Symphony No. 8: Score and critical report (in German) in the Neue Mozart-Ausgabe
73	73	Symphony No. 9	C major	11:19	1769-70 Salzburg/Italy?	Symphony No. 9: Score and critical report (in German) in the Neue Mozart-Ausgabe
74	74	Symphony No. 10	G major	08:25	1770 Milan	Symphony No. 10: Score and critical report (in German) in the Neue Mozart-Ausgabe
Symphony No. 11 is considered of doubtful authenticity
110	75b	Symphony No. 12	G major	15:35	1771 Salzburg	Symphony No. 12: Score and critical report (in German) in the Neue Mozart-Ausgabe
111+120	111+111a	Symphony No. 48	D major		1771 Milan	Symphony, K. 111+120: Score and critical report (in German) in the Neue Mozart-Ausgabe
112	112	Symphony No. 13	F major	13:19	1771 Milan	Symphony No. 13: Score and critical report (in German) in the Neue Mozart-Ausgabe
114	114	Symphony No. 14	A major	17:47	1771 Salzburg	Symphony No. 14: Score and critical report (in German) in the Neue Mozart-Ausgabe
124	124	Symphony No. 15	G major	12:18	1772 Salzburg	Symphony No. 15: Score and critical report (in German) in the Neue Mozart-Ausgabe
128	128	Symphony No. 16	C major	11:19	1772 Salzburg	Symphony No. 16: Score and critical report (in German) in the Neue Mozart-Ausgabe
129	129	Symphony No. 17	G major	12:20	1772 Salzburg	Symphony No. 17: Score and critical report (in German) in the Neue Mozart-Ausgabe
130	130	Symphony No. 18	F major	18:14	1772 Salzburg	Symphony No. 18: Score and critical report (in German) in the Neue Mozart-Ausgabe
132	132	Symphony No. 19	E♭ major	23:40	1772 Salzburg	Symphony No. 19: Score and critical report (in German) in the Neue Mozart-Ausgabe
133	133	Symphony No. 20	D major	19:02	1772 Salzburg	Symphony No. 20: Score and critical report (in German) in the Neue Mozart-Ausgabe
134	134	Symphony No. 21	A major	19:39	1772 Salzburg	Symphony No. 21: Score and critical report (in German) in the Neue Mozart-Ausgabe
161, 163	141a	Symphony No. 50	D major		1772 Salzburg	Symphony, K. 161: Score and critical report (in German) in the Neue Mozart-Ausgabe
184	161a	Symphony No. 26	E♭ major	09:02	1773 Salzburg	Symphony No. 26: Score and critical report (in German) in the Neue Mozart-Ausgabe
199	161b	Symphony No. 27	G major	16:57	1773 Salzburg	Symphony No. 27: Score and critical report (in German) in the Neue Mozart-Ausgabe
162	162	Symphony No. 22	C major	08:57	1773 Salzburg	Symphony No. 22: Score and critical report (in German) in the Neue Mozart-Ausgabe
181	162b	Symphony No. 23	D major	10:57	1773 Salzburg	Symphony No. 23: Score and critical report (in German) in the Neue Mozart-Ausgabe
182	173dA	Symphony No. 24	B♭ major	09:40	1773 Salzburg	Symphony No. 24: Score and critical report (in German) in the Neue Mozart-Ausgabe
183	173dB	Symphony No. 25 "Little G minor"	G minor	23:33	1773 Salzburg	Symphony No. 25: Score and critical report (in German) in the Neue Mozart-Ausgabe
201	186a	Symphony No. 29	A major	26:18	1774 Salzburg	Symphony No. 29: Score and critical report (in German) in the Neue Mozart-Ausgabe
202	186b	Symphony No. 30	D major	17:44	1774 Salzburg	Symphony No. 30: Score and critical report (in German) in the Neue Mozart-Ausgabe
200	189k	Symphony No. 28	C major	21:49	1774 Salzburg	Symphony No. 28: Score and critical report (in German) in the Neue Mozart-Ausgabe
196+121	196+207a	Symphony No. 51	D major		1774 Salzburg - 1775 Munich	Symphony, K. 196+121: Score and critical report (in German) in the Neue Mozart-Ausgabe
208+102	208+213c	Symphony No. 52	C major		1775 Salzburg	Symphony, K. 208+102: Score and critical report (in German) in the Neue Mozart-Ausgabe
297	300a	Symphony No. 31 "Paris"	D major	19:06	1778 Paris	Symphony No. 31: Score and critical report (in German) in the Neue Mozart-Ausgabe
318	318	Symphony No. 32 "Overture in the Italian style"	G major	08:35	1779 Salzburg	Symphony No. 32: Score and critical report (in German) in the Neue Mozart-Ausgabe
319	319	Symphony No. 33	B♭ major	21:35	1779 Salzburg	Symphony No. 33: Score and critical report (in German) in the Neue Mozart-Ausgabe
338	338	Symphony No. 34	C major	24:54	1780 Salzburg	Symphony No. 34: Score and critical report (in German) in the Neue Mozart-Ausgabe
385	385	Symphony No. 35 "Haffner"	D major	22:04	1782 Vienna	Symphony No. 35: Score and critical report (in German) in the Neue Mozart-Ausgabe
425	425	Symphony No. 36 "Linz"	C major	24:24	1783 Linz	Symphony No. 36: Score and critical report (in German) in the Neue Mozart-Ausgabe
Symphony No. 37 is considered spurious
504	504	Symphony No. 38 "Prague"	D major	24:56	1786 Vienna	Symphony No. 38: Score and critical report (in German) in the Neue Mozart-Ausgabe
543	543	Symphony No. 39	E♭ major	24:54	1788 Vienna	Symphony No. 39: Score and critical report (in German) in the Neue Mozart-Ausgabe
550	550	Symphony No. 40 "Great G minor"	G minor	26:02	1788 Vienna	Symphony No. 40 (1st version): Score and critical report (in German) in the Neue Mozart-Ausgabe; Symphony No. 40 (2nd version): Score and critical report (in German) in the Neue Mozart-Ausgabe
551	551	Symphony No. 41 "Jupiter"	C major	26:38	1788 Vienna	Symphony No. 41: Score and critical report (in German) in the Neue Mozart-Ausgabe

== Adapted from serenades ==
Number	Key	K. number	Year	Incipit
(no number)	D major	K. 204/213a	1775 Salzburg	-: Symphony, K. 204: Score and critical report (in German) in the Neue Mozart-Ausgabe
(no number)	D major	K. 250/248b	1776 Salzburg	-: Symphony, K. 250: Score and critical report (in German) in the Neue Mozart-Ausgabe
(no number)	D major	K. 320	1779 Salzburg	-: Symphony, K. 320: Score and critical report (in German) in the Neue Mozart-Ausgabe
(no number) (minuet only)	C major	K. 409/383f	1782 Vienna	-: Symphonic Minuet, K. 409: Score and critical report (in German) in the Neue Mozart-Ausgabe

== Doubtful authenticity ==
Number	Key	K. number	Year	Incipit
11 (doubtful)	D major	K. 84/73q	1770 Milan/Bologna	Symphony No. 11: Score and critical report (in German) in the Neue Mozart-Ausgabe
GA 42 (doubtful)	F major	K. 75	1771 Salzburg	Symphony, K. 75: Score and critical report (in German) in the Neue Mozart-Ausgabe
GA 43 (doubtful)	F major	K. 76/42a	1767 Vienna	Symphony, K. 76: Score and critical report (in German) in the Neue Mozart-Ausgabe
GA 44 (doubtful)	D major	K. 81/73l	1770 Rome	Symphony, K. 81: Score and critical report (in German) in the Neue Mozart-Ausgabe
GA 45 (doubtful)	D major	K. 95/73n	1770 Rome	Symphony, K. 95: Score and critical report (in German) in the Neue Mozart-Ausgabe
GA 46 (doubtful)	C major	K. 96/111b	1771 Milan	Symphony, K. 96: Score and critical report (in German) in the Neue Mozart-Ausgabe
GA 47 (doubtful)	D major	K. 97/73m	1770 Rome	Symphony, K. 97: Score and critical report (in German) in the Neue Mozart-Ausgabe
GA 54 (doubtful)	B♭ major	K. Anh. 216/74g/Anh.C 11.03	1771 Salzburg	Symphony, K. 74g: Score and critical report (in German) in the Neue Mozart-Ausgabe
GA 55 (doubtful)	B♭ major	K. Anh. 214/45b	1768 Salzburg	Symphony, K. 45b: Score and critical report (in German) in the Neue Mozart-Ausgabe
(doubtful)	D major	Symphony K. 135+61h	1772? Milan	

== Spurious authenticity ==
K. number	Title	Key	Year	Incipit
K. 17/Anh.C 11.02	Symphony No. 2 (spurious)	B♭ major	1765?	Symphony No. 2: Scores at the International Music Score Library Project
K. 18/Anh.A 51	Symphony No. 3 (spurious)	E♭ major	1767?	Symphony No. 3: Scores at the International Music Score Library Project
K. 444/(425a+Anh.A 53)	Symphony No. 37 (spurious)	G major	1783 Linz	Symphony No. 37: Scores at the International Music Score Library Project
K. 98/Anh.C 11.04	GA 56 (spurious)	F major	1771? Milan	Symphony, K. 98: Scores at the International Music Score Library Project
K. Anh. 220/16a/Anh.C 11.18	(no number) (spurious) "Odense"	A minor	1765? London	Symphony, K. 16a: Score and critical report (in German) in the Neue Mozart-Ausgabe
Notes and references:

== See also ==
- Mozart symphonies of spurious or doubtful authenticity
- List of compositions by Wolfgang Amadeus Mozart
