= 1768 in music =

This is a list of music related events in 1768.

== Events ==
- Johann Christian Bach gives the first ever solo piano performance in London, on an instrument by Johannes Zumpe.
- Wolfgang Amadeus Mozart and his family are resident in Vienna until December.
- Antonio Sacchini returns to Venice to become director of the Conservatorio dell'Ospadeletto.
- Giuseppe Tartini suffers a stroke.
- Michael Haydn marries Maria Magdalena Lipp, a singer and the daughter of the court organist.

== Popular music ==
- "The Liberty Song", with words by John Dickinson – considered the first American patriotic song.

== Opera ==
- Johann Adolf Hasse – Piramo e Tisbe
- Joseph Haydn – Lo speziale
- Niccolò Jommelli
  - Fetonte
  - La schiava liberata
- Wolfgang Amadeus Mozart
  - Bastien und Bastienne, K. 50/46b (his first published opera)
  - La finta semplice, K.51/46a
- Giovanni Paisiello – Olimpia
- Antonio Zingarelli – I quattro pazzi

== Classical music ==
- Luigi Boccherini
  - Cello Concerto in D Major
  - Cello Sonata in C major, G.6
  - 6 Violin Sonatas, G.25-30, Op. 5
- Muzio Clementi – Sonata for Harpsichord in G major
- John Garth – Six Sonatas for the Harpsichord, piano forte and organ with accompanyments for two violins and a violoncello, Op. 2
- Pietro Alessandro Guglielmi – 6 Harpsichord Quartets, Op. 1
- Joseph Haydn
  - Applausus
  - 6 String Trios, Op. 5
  - Symphony No.49 in F minor, Hob.I:49 "La passione", "Il quakuo di bel'humore"
- Michael Haydn – Missa sancti Francisci Seraphici, MH 119
- Wolfgang Amadeus Mozart – Symphonies No. 7 and No. 8
- Friedrich Schwindl – 6 Trio Sonatas, Op. 5

== Methods and theory writings ==
- William Hayes – Anecdotes of the 5 Music-Meetings
- Johann Caspar Heck – A Complete System of Harmony
- Gabriele Leone Méthode raisonnée pour passer du Violon à la Mandoline (Rational method for migrating from the violin to the mandolin)
- Jean-Jacques Rousseau – Dictionnaire de musique
- Francisco Inácio Solano – Nova arte, e breve compendio de musica

== Births ==
- January 16 – Carl Andreas Göpfert, German composer (died 1818)
- March 12 – Carolus Antonius Fodor, composer
- April 7 – Karl Theodor Toeschi, composer
- July 6 – Johann Georg Heinrich Backofen, composer and clarinetist (died 1830)
- September 1 – Carl Bernhard Wessely, composer
- September 12 – Benjamin Carr, composer
- September 14 – Georg Johann Schinn, composer
- September 21 – Louis-Emmanuel Jadin, composer, pianist and harpsichordist (c. 1863)
- November 24 – Jean-Engelbert Pauwels, composer
- December 6 – Johann Baptist Henneberg, composer
- date unknown
  - Gaetano Crivelli, operatic tenor (d. 1836)
  - Margarethe Danzi, collaborator and composer (died 1800)

== Deaths ==
- January 1 – Jean-Laurent Krafft, composer
- January 28 – John Wainwright, composer
- March 3 – Nicola Porpora, composer
- March 14 – Vigilio Blasio Faitello, composer
- July 6 – Johann Conrad Beissel, composer
- July 11 – José Melchior de Nebra Blascu, composer
- August 21 (buried) – William Walond, English composer (born 1719)
- October 28 – Michel Blavet, flautist and composer
- October 31 – Francesco Maria Veracini, violinist and composer
- November 1 – Pierre van Maldere, composer
- probable – Domenico Gallo, composer and musician (born 1730)
