= K76 =

K76 or K-76 may refer to:

- K-76 (Kansas highway), a state highway in Kansas
- Symphony, K. 76 (Mozart)
- HMS Orchis (K76), a former UK Royal Navy ship
