= K161 =

K161 or K-161 may refer to:

- K-161 (Kansas highway), a state highway in Kansas
- Kay K-161 ThinTwin, an electric guitar
- Symphony, K. 161 (Mozart)
