= Symphony No. 55 =

Symphony No. 55 may refer to:

- Symphony No. 55 (Haydn) in E-flat major (Hoboken I/55, The Schoolmaster) by Joseph Haydn, c. 1774
- Symphony No. 55 (Mozart) in B-flat major (K. Anh. 214/45b) probably by Wolfgang Amadeus Mozart, 1768
