= Symphony, K. 19b (Mozart) =

Lost symphony by Wolfgang Amadeus Mozart

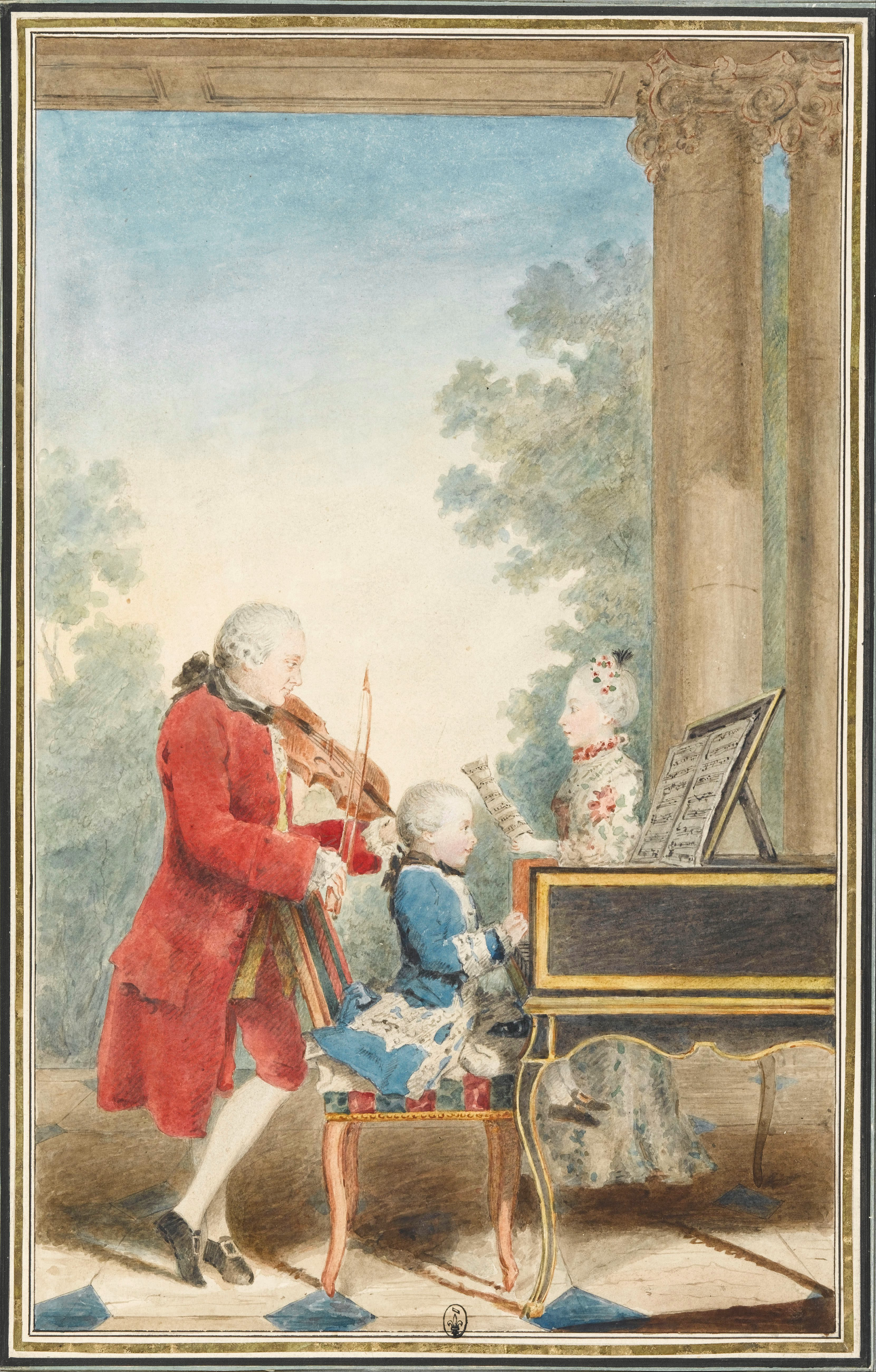
Carmontelle's 1763–64 Mozart family portrait

The lost Symphony in C major, K. Anh. 222/19b, was probably written by Wolfgang Amadeus Mozart in early 1765 in London. It is one of the twelve symphonies that Ludwig von Köchel only knew by its incipit in the Breitkopf & Härtel manuscript catalogue (p. 10, No. 68), which listed it as one of six symphonies (Nos. 65–70) sourced from Luigi Gatti (1740–1817), Court Kapellmeister in Salzburg from around 1782:

The instrumentation for the symphony is unknown, but Alfred Einstein speculated that it would have been the same as the contemporary known symphonies K. 16 and K. 19 (strings, 2 oboes, and 2 horns). In his third edition of the Köchel catalogue, he dated it to early 1765 in London, and opined that the incipit showed the influence of J. C. Bach's symphonies. His remarks were copied unchanged by the sixth edition of the Köchel catalogue. Neal Zaslaw agreed that the opening was characteristic of J. C. Bach in his book Mozart's Symphonies, but questioned if this was a legitimate method of dating works, given that the seven symphonies of J. C. Bach beginning in this march-like way were written later than Mozart's stay in London, that Mozart himself used similar openings in later works (e.g. in the twenty-sixth symphony, K. 184/161a), and that this style of opening was much used by other composers as well in the period. Thus he opines that a stylistical analysis cannot credibly be performed until the work is rediscovered.

Nevertheless, the wrapper used for the set of parts to enclose the K. 19 symphony in D had been used previously for a symphony in F (K. 19a) and then one in C (possibly K. 19b), as can be seen from the deletions and insertions on the title page, which suggested to Zaslaw that Mozart had written a C major symphony before K. 19 and that K. 19b should receive a lower Köchel number. Stephen Fischer however pointed out in his 1995 review of Zaslaw's book that the scores were parts rather than full scores, thus not constituting solid evidence for such a chronology. He also speculates that K. 19b may have been the symphony Maria Anna Mozart referred to when she remembered Wolfgang having "composed his first symphony with all the instruments of the orchestra, especially Trumpets and Kettledrums" when Leopold was dangerously ill. K. 16, though traditionally numbered as the first symphony, does not have this instrumentation: thus a lost work must be referred to. Though Zaslaw identified it with a possible E♭ major symphony ("No. 0") possibly derived from pieces in the London Sketchbook (K. 15a–15ss), Fischer believed that the use of trumpets and timpani would be more likely for a C major symphony like K. 19b. Though the wrapper for K. 19 does not mention trumpets nor timpani, he notes that the set of parts was originally for an F-major symphony (K. 19a) and that Leopold may not have deemed it necessary to change the list of parts.

The authenticity of this symphony is more credibly shown by the source attribution to Gatti in the Breitkopf & Härtel manuscript catalogue, making it plausible that it was among the six sent to Donaueschingen by Leopold Mozart in 1767.
