= K114 =

K114 or K-114 may refer to:

- K-114 (Kansas highway), a state highway in Kansas
- Russian submarine Tula (K-114)
- HMS Bellwort (K114), a former UK Royal Navy ship
- 9K114 Shturm, a Russian anti-tank missile system
- Symphony No. 14 (Mozart) in A major, by Mozart
