= Symphony No. 43 =

Symphony No. 43 may refer to:

- Symphony No. 43 (Haydn) in E-flat major (Hoboken I/43, Mercury) by Joseph Haydn, c. 1771
- Symphony No. 43 (Mozart) in F major (K. 76/42a) probably by Wolfgang Amadeus Mozart
