= Symphony No. 15 (Mozart) =

1772 symphony by W. A. Mozart

- by W. A. Mozart
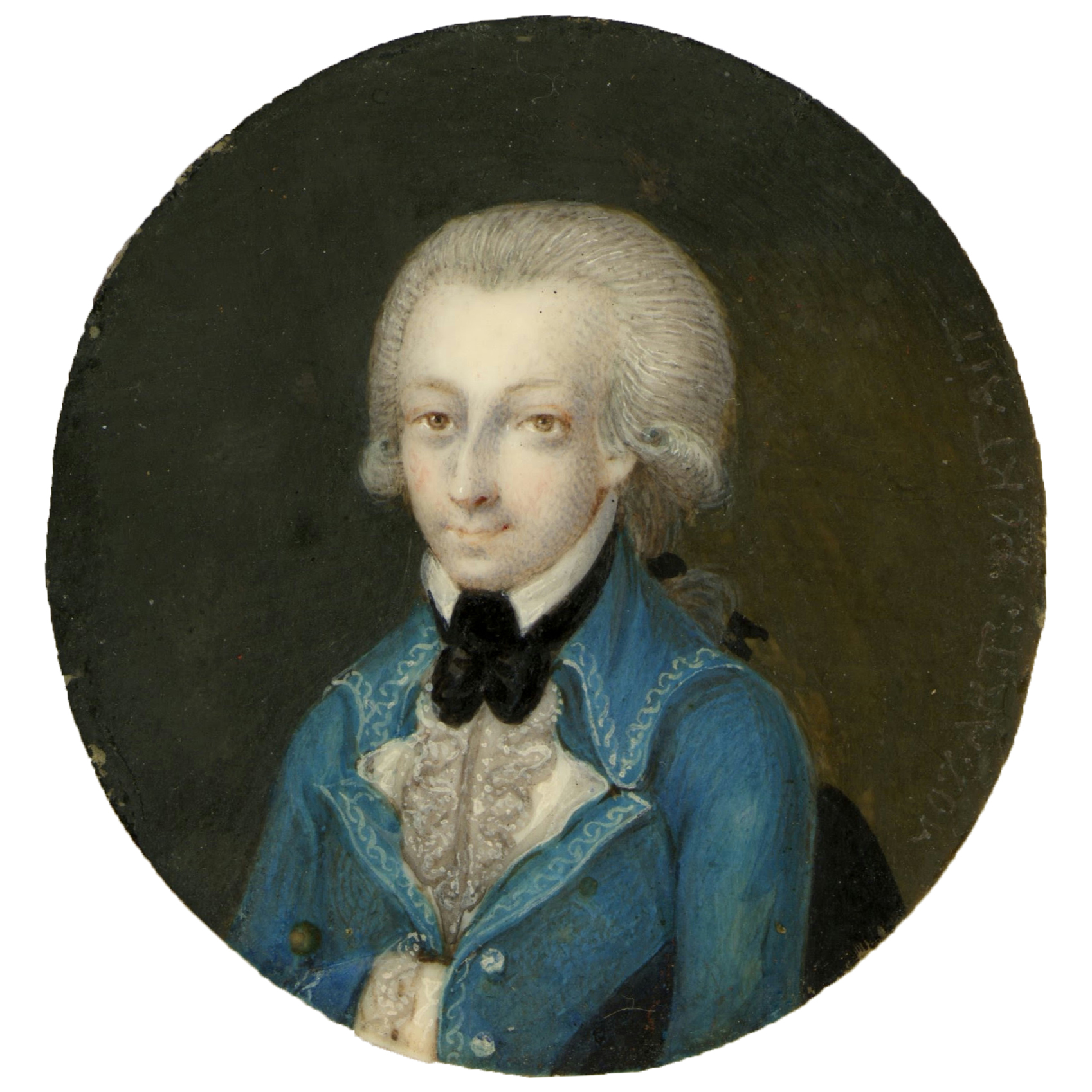
- Mozart in 1773, portrait by Martin Knoller
- Key: G major
- Catalogue: K. 124
- Composed: Salzburg, January/February 1772
- Duration: c. 15 minutes
- Movements: 4
- Scoring: Orchestra

Wolfgang Amadeus Mozart composed his Symphony No. 15 in G major, K. 124, at the age of sixteen in Salzburg during the first weeks of 1772. A note on the autograph manuscript indicates that it might have been written for a religious occasion, possibly in honour of the new Archbishop of Salzburg.

== Music ==
The work is scored for two oboes, two horns in G, and strings.

It is in four movements, the first of which has been described as innovative and "daring", in view of its variations of tempo. The last movement is characterised by good humour and frivolity, with "enough ending jokes to bring the house down".

1. Allegro, 3/4
2. Andante, C major, 2/4
3. Menuetto and Trio, trio in D major, 3/4
4. Presto, 2/4

== Sources ==
- Dearling, Robert: The Music of Wolfgang Amadeus Mozart: The Symphonies Associated University Presses, London 1982 ISBN 0-8386-2335-2
- Kenyon, Nicholas: The Pegasus Pocket Guide to Mozart Pegasus Books, New York 2006 ISBN 1-933648-23-6
- Zaslaw, Neal:Mozart's Symphonies: Context, Performance Practice, Reception Oxford University Press, Oxford 1991 ISBN 0-19-816286-3
