= Serenade No. 7 (Mozart) =

1776 serenade by Wolfgang Amadeus Mozart

- Haffner
- by W. A. Mozart
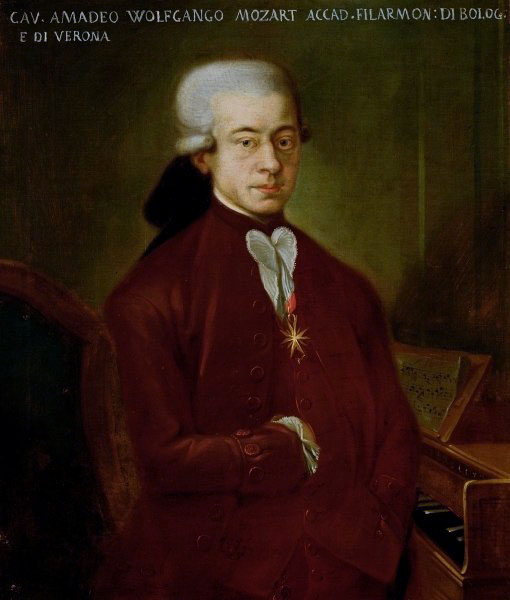
- 1777 Bologna portrait of Mozart
- Key: D major
- Catalogue: K. 250/248b
- Style: Classical period
- Commissioned by: Sigmund Haffner the Younger
- Composed: 1776
- Performed: 21 July 1776
- Duration: 1 hour
- Movements: 8
- Scoring: Orchestra

The Serenade for orchestra in D major, K. 250 (248b), popularly known as the Haffner Serenade, is a serenade by Wolfgang Amadeus Mozart named for the Haffner family. Mozart's friend and contemporary Sigmund Haffner the Younger commissioned the serenade to be used in the course of the festivities before the wedding of his sister Marie Elisabeth Haffner and her intended, Franz Xaver Spaeth. The Serenade was first played on 21 July 1776, on the eve of the wedding.

It is in eight movements:

1. Allegro maestoso - Allegro molto
2. Andante
3. Menuetto
4. Rondeau: Allegro
5. Menuetto galante
6. Andante
7. Menuetto
8. Adagio - Allegro assai

The second, third and fourth movements feature prominent violin solos. Indeed, the rondeau (the fourth movement) has been arranged for solo violin and used as a popular virtuoso piece.

It is assumed that the Marcia K. 249 was intended as entrance and exit music together with this Serenade.

A typical performance lasts roughly an hour.

== See also ==
- Haffner Symphony, K. 385, another celebrated piece commissioned by Haffner
