= Symphony No. 56 =

Symphony No. 56 may refer to:

- Symphony No. 56 (Haydn) in C major (Hoboken I/56) by Joseph Haydn, c. 1774
- Symphony No. 56 (Mozart) in F major (K. 98/Anh.C 11.04) authorship uncertain, c. 1771
