= Symphony, K. 135+61h (Mozart) =

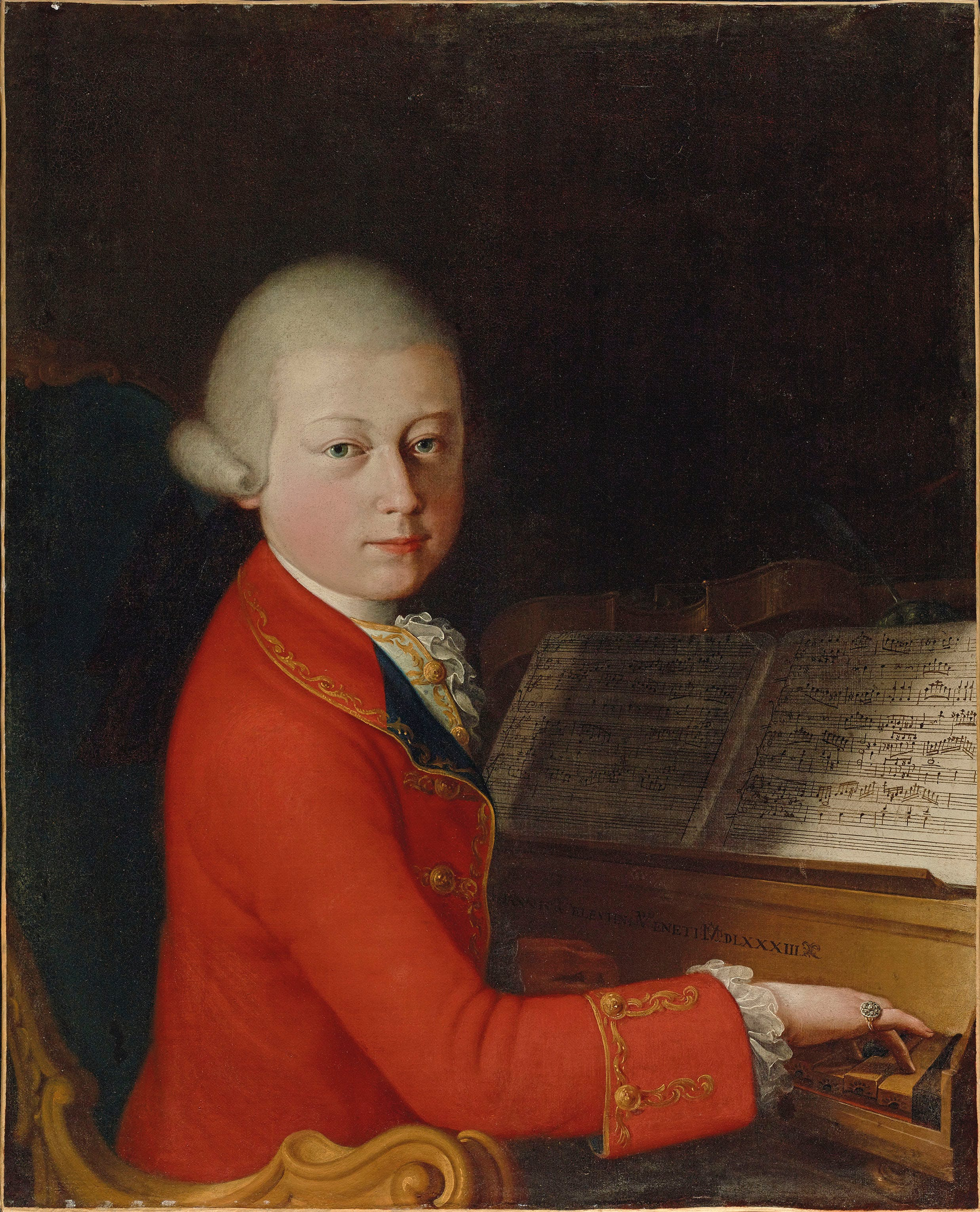
1770 Verona portrait of Mozart

The Symphony in D major, K. 135+61h, was probably composed by Wolfgang Amadeus Mozart in 1772. The first, second, and fourth movements are from the overture to the opera Lucio Silla, K. 135, and the third movement, the minuet K. 61h No. 3, was composed separately.

The symphony is scored for two oboes, two horns, two trumpets, timpani and strings.

== History and attribution ==
The symphony was discovered by Ernst Hintermaier in 1991. The parts he discovered were copied by Matthias Kracher, who was in close connection to Michael Haydn, but probably did not have a direct contact with the Mozart family. Hintermaier thought that Kracher did not expand the three-movement overture to Lucio Silla with a minuet, but instead copied all four movements from a set of parts or a full score of the complete four-movement symphony. The three overture movements in Kracher's copy are almost exactly identical with Mozart's autograph, but the minuet differs greatly from the copy of K. 61h by Johann Nepomuk Rainsprechter and an unknown copyist in Salzburg. Hintermaier also argued that the four-movement symphony is by Mozart, written some time after his return from Milan in March 1773, that this four-movement symphony was not cut down to three movements for the Lucio Silla overture, and that the four-movement symphony should be printed in a future NMA volume.

The six minuets of K. 61h are doubtful. They were discovered by Friedrich Frischenschlager in some copies of Mozart's orchestral dances in the music archives of St. Peter in Salzburg in the early 20th century, and they were published in the 1923 Mozart Jahrbuch. This copy attributes the minuets to Wolfgang, and Frischenschlager accepted this attribution even though the dynamics were not in Mozart's style. He dated them between 1768 and 1772.

Alfred Einstein dated the minuets to 1769 in Salzburg in his edition of the Köchel catalogue. Rudolf Elvers dated them instead to 1771-1772 in the NMA in 1961. The sixth edition of the Köchel catalogue repeated Einstein's dating of 1769.

Wolfgang Plath placed doubts on K. 61h in the 1971/72 Mozart Jahrbuch, as some other minuets originally attributed to Mozart during this time were actually composed by Michael Haydn. He thought that K. 61h could be part of the 18 Minuets by Michael Haydn that Wolfgang told his sister he would make piano arrangements of. In the 1995 Mozart Jahrbuch, Andrea Lindmayr-Brandl stated that the authenticity for K. 61h was doubtful, but used Hintermaier's findings on the "Lucio Silla" symphony to say that Mozart's authorship was "at least probable", dating the set to ca. 1772.

Rainsprechter was connected to Michael Haydn, and might have inserted a Michael Haydn minuet into the overture to make a symphony; since Mozart made copies of Michael Haydn's minuets, he could have believed it to be original Mozart. On the other hand, Rainsprechter had studied under Leopold Mozart, and may have obtained this symphony from him; if this is the case, this symphony is very likely to be authentic.
