= Symphony, K. 19a (Mozart) =

1765 composition by W. A. Mozart

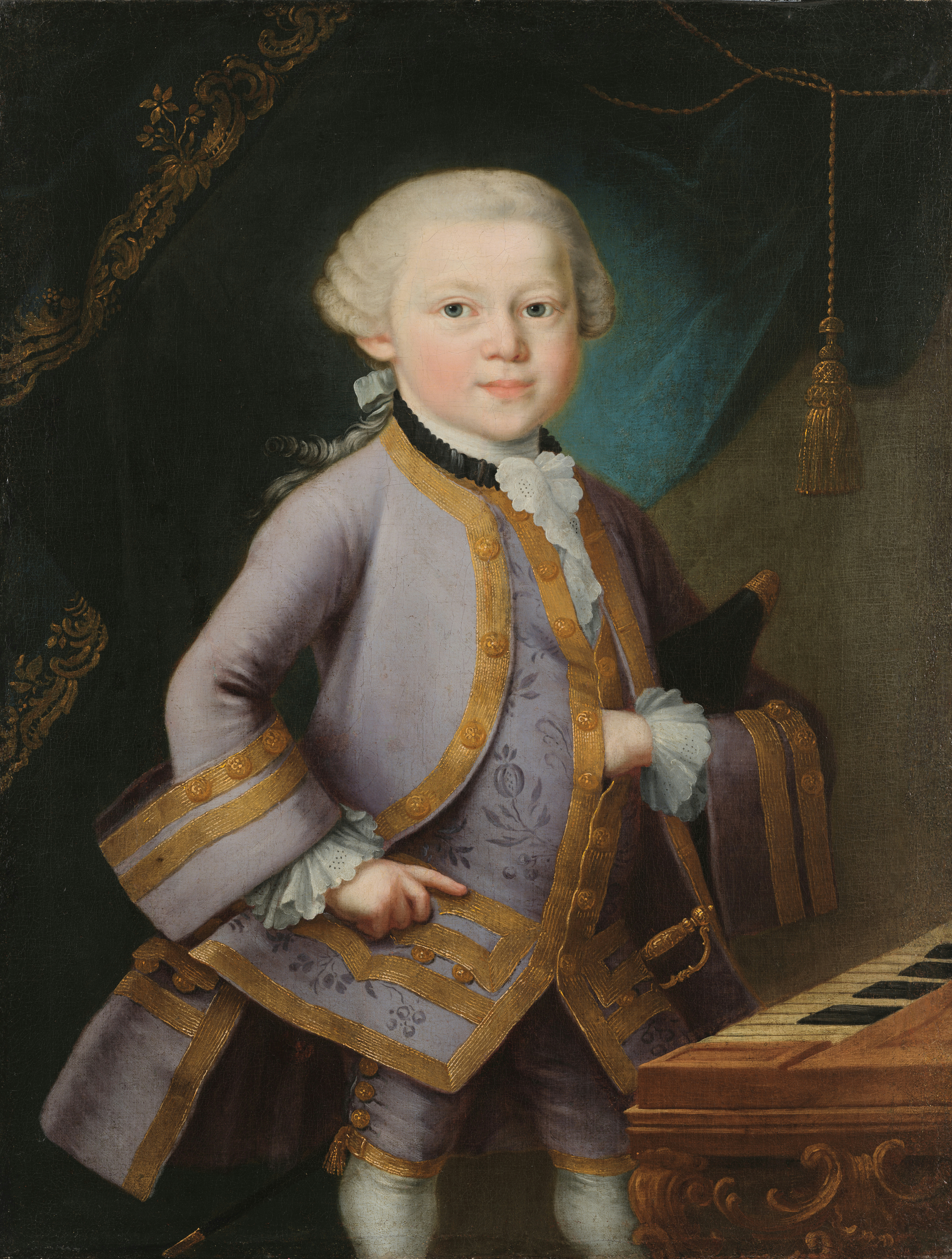
1763 portrait of Mozart

The Symphony in F major, K. Anh. 223/19a, was written by Wolfgang Amadeus Mozart probably in early 1765 in London during the Mozart family's grand tour.

The symphony is scored for two oboes, two horns and strings. In contemporary orchestras, it was also usual to include bassoons and harpsichord if they were available in the orchestra to reinforce the bass line and act as the continuo. The oboes are silent for the second movement. The duration is approximately 12 to 14 minutes.

The symphony consists of the following movements:

1. Allegro assai, 4/4
2. Andante, 2/4
3. Presto, 3/8

The symphony was lost until a copy in the hand of Leopold Mozart was found in 1980. The title page stated it to be composed when Wolfgang was 9 years old; that is, in 1765. However, since Leopold often advertised his son as being younger than his actual age, this date is questionable. Before the discovery, only incipits were known, from the archives of Breitkopf & Härtel and on the third page of the cover for the K. 19 symphony. (This cover had previously served as a cover for this symphony and a Symphony in C, K. 19b, still lost). The symphony had still not been found at the time of K^{6}.

The symphony is influenced by Johann Christian Bach. Harold C. Schonberg notes that the symphony "has no individuality" on account of Mozart's very young age at the time of its composition.
