= Carl-Maria-von-Weber-Gesamtausgabe =

Catalog of the works of Carl Maria von Weber

The Carl-Maria-von-Weber-Gesamtausgabe (short WeGA) is a scientific-critical edition of all works of the composer Carl Maria von Weber, published by the Schott Music publishing house in Mainz.

== Content ==
The edition, which is sponsored by the Academy of Sciences and Literature in Mainz, aims to make all of Weber's compositions, letters, diaries and writings publicly accessible until the 200th anniversary of his death in 2026. The edition will comprise about 50 volumes of music including critical reports, 10 volumes of letters, about 8 volumes of diaries, 2 volumes of writings, a catalogue raisonné and several volumes of documents. All text parts – excluding the musical notation – will initially be published as a digital edition.

== Workplaces ==
The edition is being produced under the direction of Gerhard Allroggen (1936–2025) at two places of work: the Staatsbibliothek zu Berlin and the Musicology Department of the University of Paderborn at the Musikhochschule Detmold. Chief editor is Joachim Veit.

== Complete works ==
Prefatory material and critical notes in German and English.

- Serie I: Kirchenmusik
- Serie II: Kantaten, Huldigungsmusiken und andere Gelegenheitswerke
- Serie III: Bühnenwerke und Vertonungen dramatischer Texte
- Serie IV: Lieder und Gesänge
- Serie V: Orchesterwerke (mit konzertanten Werken)
- Serie VI: Kammermusik
- Serie VII: Klaviermusik (zu 2 und 4 Händen)
- Serie VIII: Bearbeitungen (mit Klavierauszügen)
- Serie IX: Varia
- Serie X: Incerta
- Weber-Studies
