= Symphony, K. Anh. C 11.18 =

Symphony formerly attributed to W. A. Mozart

The Symphony in A minor, "Odense", K. Anh. 220/16a/Anh.C 11.18, was formerly attributed to Wolfgang Amadeus Mozart. It is now generally accepted by scholars to be a spurious work, although its true composer remains unknown.

== Music ==
The symphony is scored for two oboes, two bassoons, two horns in A, and strings. In contemporary orchestras, it was usual to not write in the parts for the bassoons and harpsichord, and they would simply double the cellos and double basses if they were available in the orchestra to reinforce the bass line and act as the continuo; however, the bassoons in this symphony do not simply double the cellos and double basses.

The symphony consists of the following movements:

1. Allegro moderato,, A minor
2. Andantino, 2/4, A major
3. Rondo: Allegro moderato, 2/4, A minor

The duration is approximately 13 minutes.

== History and attribution ==
The Leipzig publisher Breitkopf & Härtel tried to publish all of Mozart's works in 1799. They collected Mozart's works from his sister, his wife, musicians, copyists and other publishers. This compilation ultimately included a four-bar-long incipit for a symphony in the key of A minor, with its source reported to be Hamburg music dealer Johann Christoph Westphal. Whether Breitkopf & Härtel ever had a complete copy of the symphony seems disputed, but, besides the incipit, their catalogue only noted that its manuscript could no longer be found. In the Köchel catalogue published in the 1860s, Ludwig Ritter von Köchel listed the work as lost and placed it in the Anhang (appendix), assigning it the number K. Anh. 220.

Alfred Einstein suggested in his 1937 edition of the Köchel catalogue that the symphony was composed in 1765 in London, based on the incipit and Mozart's first surviving symphony, K. 16. He gave the work the Köchel number 16a and stated that the early time of composition is obviously recognisable even from the few surviving bars. The sixth edition of the Köchel catalogue (1964) merely repeated this.

In 1982, the complete symphony was found as a copy (and, notably, not an autograph) in the handwriting of several copyists in the archives of the Municipal Symphony Orchestra in Odense, Denmark. A note on the title page indicates that this symphony entered the possession of the Danish Collegium Musicum by 1793 at the latest, with the watermark in the paper of the orchestral parts showing the date 1779. None of the copyists in the Mozart family circle could have copied this symphony. In the 1780s, Westphal had some authentic Mozart symphonies, along with some works with dubious sources, such as K. Anh. C 11.08 and this one, which was probably among a set of works he sold to the Danish Collegium Musicum.

Wolfgang Plath published the symphony, now known as the "Odense" symphony, and put it in a scientific symposium for the experts. The symphony was recorded, among others, by the Academy of Ancient Music under the direction of Christopher Hogwood and was included in the Neue Mozart-Ausgabe under "Works of doubtful authenticity" in 2000 because the authenticity debate was then not yet complete, especially since an alternative to Mozart as the author could still not be named.

Neal Zaslaw stated that the symphony was probably composed later than 1765, and that the stylistic proximity to other Mozart symphonies of the 1760s and 1770s make accurate dating impossible without an authentic source and that this symphony was often different stylistically from all other Mozart works. Wolfgang Gersthofer ignored this symphony in his review of Mozart's early symphonies because most experts did not consider it authentic Mozart. Volker Scherliess stated that after long and intensive discussion, Mozart experts have agreed that the "Odense" symphony cannot be considered a work of Mozart in both tradition and style. Scott Fruehwald concluded that the symphony was not by Mozart, based on stylistic analysis.

=== Deleted movement ===
On the back of the fourth page of the autograph of the Wind Divertimento in B♭ major, K. 186/159b, there are 16 crossed-out bars for strings, 2 oboes and 2 horns. Alfred Einstein, in his edition of the Köchel catalogue, thought this was an Andante in E♭ major belonging to a symphony written much earlier, perhaps to the (then undiscovered) K. Anh. C 11.18. The sixth edition of the Köchel catalogue largely repeated this, but reworded it to imply that the association remained uncertain.

Wolfgang Plath dated the divertimento to 1772, but the 16 bars to 1765 or 1766 based on the handwriting. He also corrected the key to G♯ minor and thought that Mozart later reused this piece of paper for the final version of the Minuet and Trio from the divertimento. Franz Giegling transcribed these bars and his transcription was printed in the critical report to the NMA (Neue Mozart-Ausgabe) volume of wind divertimenti (published in 1987), which he edited. By then, the K. Anh. C 11.18 symphony had been discovered and Einstein's connection had been disproved (since the Andante was in G♯ minor, any work it belonged to would probably have to be in B major). Neal Zaslaw printed a reconstruction of this "orchestral draft", stating that the draft contained internal inconsistencies and errors and that the reconstruction was based on the assumption that Mozart was hearing the piece in G♯ minor and B major, but could not write it correctly as he had not yet learned some necessary aspects of musical notation, such as double sharps.

This G♯ minor piece was given the number K. 638 in the ninth edition of the Köchel catalogue (edited by Neal Zaslaw).
