= Symphony No. 2 (Mozart) =

1765/66 symphony by Leopold Mozart

Symphony in B♭ major
- by Leopold Mozart
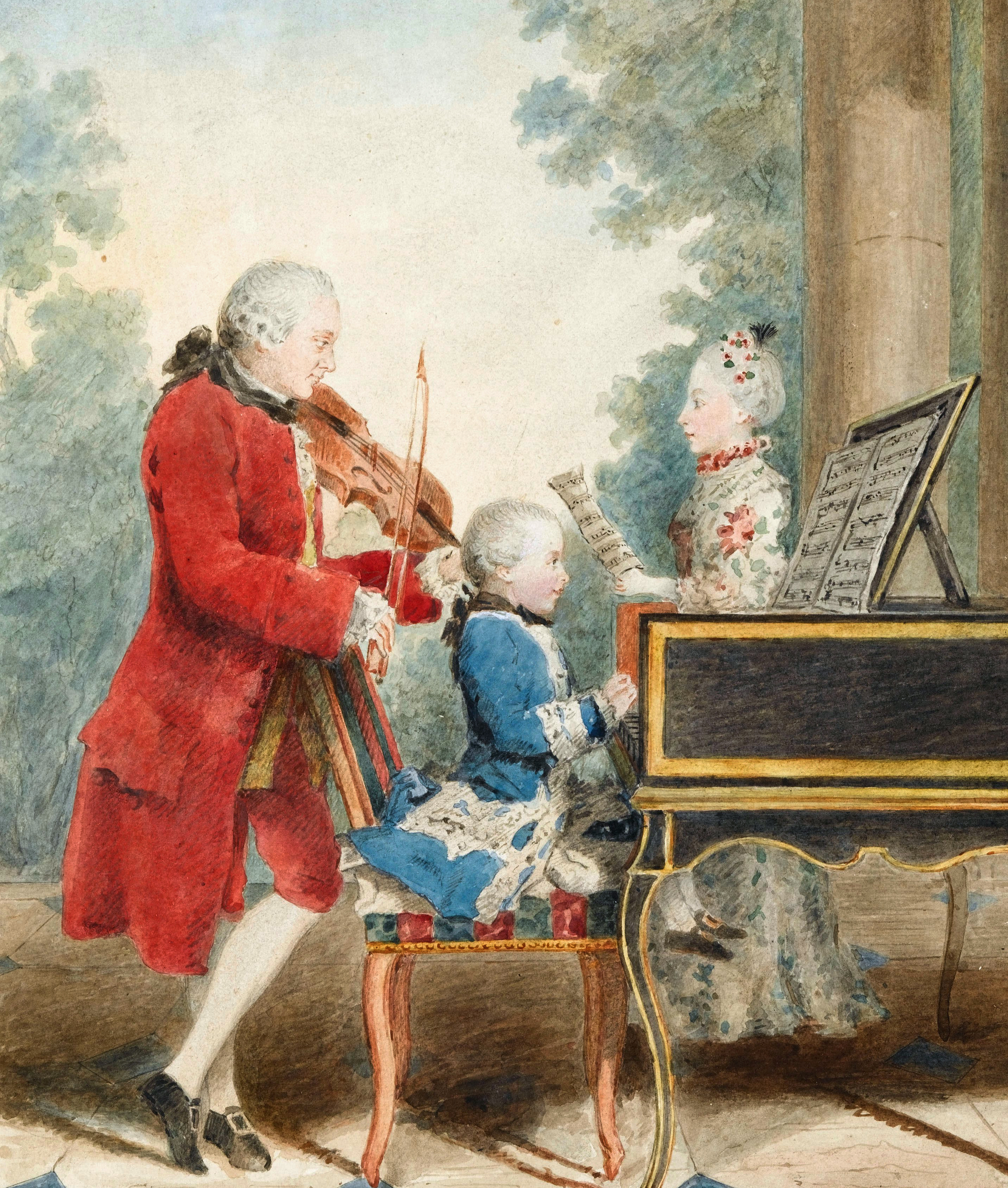
- Detail of Carmontelle's Mozart family watercolour
- Catalogue: K. 17/Anh. C 11.02; Eisen B♭6; LMV VII:B6
- Composed: 1765 or 1766
- Duration: c. 17 minutes
- Movements: 4
- Scoring: Orchestra with continuo

The piece of music once known as Wolfgang Amadeus Mozart's Symphony No. 2 in B♭ major, K. 17/Anh. C 11.02, is now considered to not be by him, but by possibly his father, Leopold Mozart. This symphony has been given the number Anhang (Anh.) C 11.02 in the sixth edition of Ludwig Ritter von Köchel's catalogue of Mozart's music, and is now also catalogued as Eisen B♭6 (LMV VII:B6) in Cliff Eisen's catalogue of Leopold Mozart's symphonies.

== Music ==
The symphony is scored for two oboes, two horns in B♭, strings, and basso continuo.

The symphony is in four movements in the usual quick–slow–minuet–quick pattern:

1. Allegro
2. (Andante) in E♭ major
3. Menuetto I & II
4. Presto

== Publication ==
The publication of this symphony in the Alte Mozart-Ausgabe, the first collected edition of Mozart's music, shows several points at which smaller, editorially-supplied notes are given, suggesting an unfinished composition. For instance, in "Menuetto I", only the first violin and cello/double bass parts are completed; the second violin and viola parts in their entirety in this movement are editorial additions.

Since K. 17 is no longer believed to be by W. A. Mozart, the Neue Mozart-Ausgabe does not include this symphony as part of its edition.
