= Carl Andreas Göpfert =

German clarinettist and composer (1768–1818)

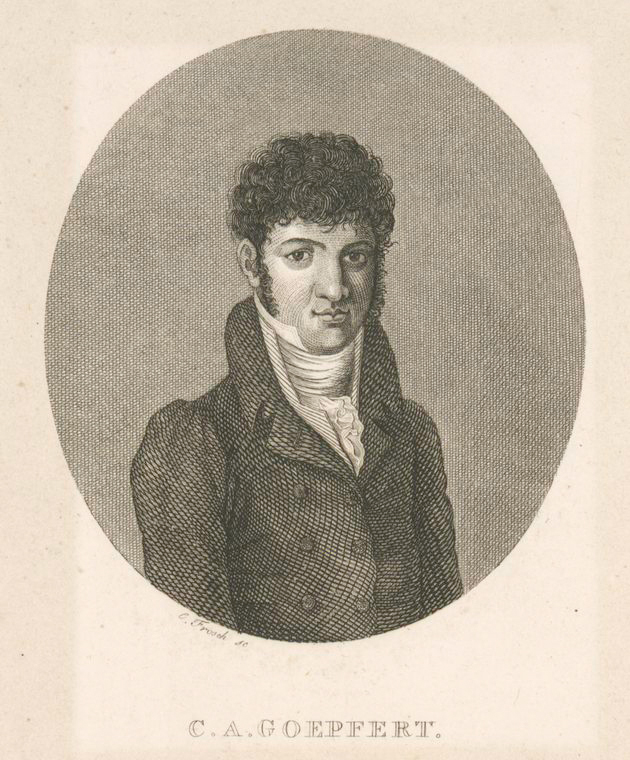
Carl Andreas Göpfert (1768–1818)

Carl Andreas Göpfert (or Goepfert) (1768–1818) was a German virtuoso clarinettist, and composer. Göpfert composed in several genres, including symphonies, concerti, wind ensembles, sonatas, and songs.

Carl Andreas Göpfert, in his lifetime salaried Chamber Musician to the Duke of Saxe-Meiningen, excellent virtuoso on the clarinet and admirable composer, was born on 16 January 1768 in Rimpar near Würzburg, the son of a surgical officer. Initially taught singing, piano and organ by the local schoolmaster, his preference for the clarinet led him in 1780 to the celebrated Würzburg clarinet virtuoso Philipp Meissner, who may also have taught him the rudiments of composition. Göpfert's rapidly acquired phenomenal skill on the clarinet led to his being engaged as first clarinettist of the Meiningen court orchestra at the age of 20. As his gentle character prevented him from insisting, he had less and less opportunity to become known further afield as a virtuoso, which would certainly have brought him as much acclaim as did his very popular compositions. He received a golden medal for dedicating a Fantasia militare for wind band to King Wilhelm III. In 1788 Göpfert moved to Vienna.

While in Vienna, he studied music theory and composition with Mozart for about a year and a half. In 1793 he became first clarinet with the orchestra in the Meiningen Court Orchestra and later took charge of court military music as well. He obtained a leave of absence in 1798 to establish himself as a soloist in Vienna; however this was cancelled and he was forced to return to Meiningen where the post of Kapellmeister failed to materialize. Göpfert tried at least twice to acquire a better post. The first involved his sending a large number of works to France; these were dedicated to the French army and Napoleon as First Consul (post mid-1800–1804). This set of pieces describes him as first clarinet in the Kapelle and director of the music for the Graf's Hunting Corps. In 1817 he applied for a post at Oettingen-Wallerstein and it is his letter to them which contains the remarks about studying with Mozart and arranging his works for Harmoniemusik. Göpfert writes: "As I have been studying with the greatest fervor for some twenty years, and also for a year and a half had instruction from Mozart in the advanced study of music theory. I have always preferred those instruments in the wind ensembles, and therefore my esteemed teacher, Mozart, gave to me all of the scores of his operas, instructing me to arrange them for wind band."

Honoured as a lovable, upright person, Göpfert died in Meiningen on 11 April 1818. Göpfert's compositional output, valued and much played during his lifetime, now mostly slumbers in archives. Göpfert was an excellent composer and arranger and he may very well have been the house arranger for Simrock in Bonn. This may explain his arrangements of Mozart's vocal works since Simrock published the originals between 1798 and 1800. He also prepared an octet version of Mozart's Gran Partita, and arranged marches, the Paris Symphony (K. 297) and the Rondo alla Turca from the piano sonata K. 331. His arrangement of Haydn's Creation from 1817 remains lost, as do most of his works for clarinet. Unpublished works include three symphonies, an oboe concerto, a trumpet concerto, a double concerto for two bassoons, piano pieces, songs, guitar pieces and a wealth of sonorous wind band pieces. A work previously thought to be unpublished, a Concertante for clarinet, bassoon and orchestra was issued by André, Offenbach c. 1818.

== Selected works ==
- 15 Dances for 2 oboes, 2 clarinets, 2 bassoons, 2 horns, trumpet.
- Concerto in B♭ major for Clarinet, Op. 1
- Quartet for clarinet, violin, viola, and cello, Op. 2
- Sonata for two guitars and flute, Op. 11
- Sonata for bassoon (or viola) and guitar, Op. 13
- Concerto in E♭ for clarinet, Op. 14
- Sonata for flute and guitar, Op. 15
- 3 Quartets for clarinet, violin, viola, and cello, Op. 16
- Twelve small pieces for two guitars, Op. 17
- Variations for guitar and flute, Op. 18
- 2 Duos concertants for clarinet and bassoon, Op. 19
- Concerto in B♭ for clarinet, Op. 20
- Concerto in F for horn and orchestra, Op. 21
- 3 Duos concertantes, Op. 22
- 24 duos for two horns, Op. 23
- Six Songs with piano or guitar accompaniment, Op. 25
- Douze pieces d'harmonic pour two clarinets, two horns, and two bassoons, Op. 26
- Concerto in B♭ for clarinet, Op. 27
- Variations pour la Flute, Accomp with two Violins, Viola, cello, 2 oboes, 2 horns & 2 Bassoons, Op. 28
- 6 Easy duos for two clarinets, Op. 30
- 24 Easy duos for two horns, Op. 31
- Premier Potpourri for clarinet and orchestra, Op. 32
- Fantaisie militaire pour l'orchestre, Op. 33
- Concerto in E♭ for clarinet, Op. 35
- Easy Sonata for piano and horn (or viola), Op. 35 (Shares the same Opus number as his clarinet concerto). Published after his death in Leipzig 1823
- 3 Quartets for clarinet violin, viola and cello, Op. 36
- 3 Progressive duos for two violins, Op. 37
- Deuxième Pot-pourri pour la Clarinet, Accomp with two Violins, Viola, cello, two oboes, two horns, two bassoons, Op. 38
