= Symphony No. 7 (Mozart) =

1768 composition by W. A. Mozart

- by W. A. Mozart
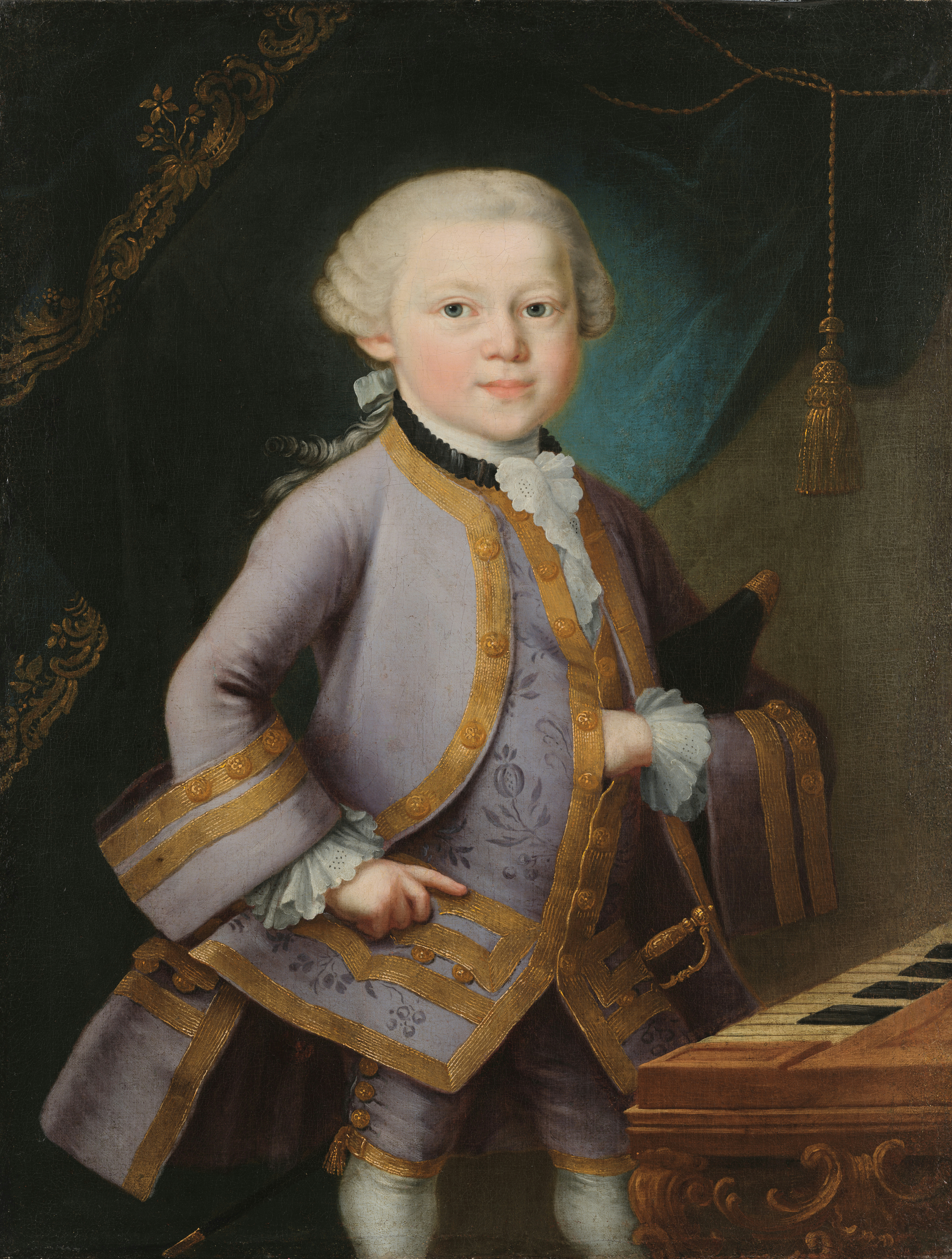
- Portrait of Mozart, 1763
- Key: D major
- Catalogue: K. 45
- Composed: Vienna, January 1768
- Movements: 4
- Scoring: Orchestra with continuo

Wolfgang Amadeus Mozart's Symphony No. 7 in D major, K. 45, was completed in Vienna in January 1768 when he was twelve years old, after the family's return from a visit to Olomouc and Brno in Moravia. Its first performance was probably at a private concert.

The symphony was reworked to become the overture to Mozart's opera, La finta semplice, K. 51, composed and performed later that year, and the overture itself was subsequently adapted further to create a new symphony, known in the Köchel 1964 (K6) catalogue as K. 46a.

The autograph of the score is preserved in the Berlin State Library.

== Music ==
For the original (K. 45) version the instrumentation was: two oboes, bassoon, two horns, two trumpets, timpani, strings, and continuo. For the symphonic overture (K. 46a) version the trumpets were replaced with flutes, an extra bassoon was added, and the timpani were excised.

The symphony is in four movements.

1. Molto allegro,
2. Andante,
3. Menuetto and Trio, 3/4 (this movement was omitted from the "overture" version)
4. Molto allegro, 2/4

== Performance history ==
According to analyst Neal Zaslaw, the first occasion on which the K. 45 version could have been heard was a concert given by Prince von Galitzin, the Russian ambassador, at his Vienna residence in late March 1768. The K. 46b version was heard at the premiere of La finta semplice, at Salzburg on 1 May 1769.

== Sources ==
- Osborne, Charles (1992). The Complete Operas of Mozart. London: Gollancz. ISBN 0-575-03823-3.
- Zaslaw, Neal (1991). Mozart's Symphonies: Context, Performance Practice, Reception. Oxford: Oxford University Press. ISBN 0-19-816286-3.
