= Gerhard Allroggen =

German musicologist (1936–2025)

Gerhard Allroggen (19 May 1936 – 13 November 2025) was a German musicologist and university professor from Detmold and Paderborn.

== Life and career ==
Born in Bochum, Allroggen gained his habilitation in 1976 at the Ruhr-Universität Bochum. From 1977, he was professor at the Musikwissenschaftliches Seminar Detmold/Paderborn of the Hochschule für Musik Detmold. From 1991 to 1995, he was also vice-rector of the Paderborn University. He retired in 2001.

Allroggen's research interests included the music and musical aesthetics of early German Romanticism, Wolfgang Amadeus Mozart, and the Neapolitan Opera of the late 18th century.

Allroggen was a member of the Neue Mozart-Ausgabe, co-editor of the complete edition of the literary works of E. T. A. Hoffmann, and leader of the Carl-Maria-von-Weber-Gesamtausgabe. He died in Hamburg on 13 November 2025, at the age of 89.

== Publications ==
- E. T. A. Hoffmanns Kompositionen. Ein chronologisch-thematisches Verzeichnis seiner musikalischen Werke mit Einführung (Studien zur Musikgeschichte des 19. Jahrhunderts, vol. 16) Regensburg: Bosse, 1970
- E. T. A. Hoffmann, Die lustigen Musikanten. Singspiel in zwei Akten. (Ausgewählte musikalische Werke von E. T. A. Hoffmann), Mainz: Schott, 1975/76
- Weber-Studien. (co-editor), continuous series.
- Festschrift Arno Forchert zum 60. Geburtstag.

== Festschrift ==
- Joachim Veit and Frank Ziegler (ed.): Weber-Studien, vol. 3 (Festschrift Gerhard Allroggen zum 60. Geburtstag), Mainz 1996
