= Symphony No. 37 (Mozart) =

1783 Michael Haydn symphony misattributed to Mozart

Michael Haydn, the true author of the Symphony No. 37, once attributed to Mozart

Symphony No. 37 in G major, (K. 444/425a + Anh A 53) is a work that was once attributed to Wolfgang Amadeus Mozart and given a place in the Köchel catalogue as well as the number '37'. It is in fact Symphony No. 25 in G major by Michael Haydn, bearing the catalogue numbers P 16 and MH 334. This mistake, long ago corrected, resulted from a brief musical introduction (an adagio maestoso) added by Mozart to Haydn's symphony.

== History ==
The complete symphony was for a long time believed to be a work by Mozart, but is now known to have actually been mostly written by Michael Haydn, being his Symphony No. 25 in G major, Perger 16, Sherman 25, MH 334. The true authorship was discovered by Lothar Perger in 1907. Modern commentators find it "difficult to comprehend how the editors of the Breitkopf edition of Mozart could have considered the three movements of the G major symphony as the immediate successor of the 'Linz' Symphony; the infinitely simpler and more archaic art of the Salzburg master offers such a contrast that one might well suppose this symphony to date much earlier than 1783" if Mozart had been the one to write it.

The introduction was probably composed in late 1783 to be performed in the same concert in Linz in which Mozart's Symphony No. 36 received its premiere.

Mozart's Adagio maestoso introduction in triple time ends with a fermata on a V^{7} chord, which leads into a tonic chord beginning Haydn's work. Georges de Saint-Foix considers the introduction "an expressive prelude, which, moreover, is by no means entirely in key with the movement it is intended to prepare."

Mozart did not copy the rest of the work verbatim: he removed a bassoon solo from the middle Andante sostenuto movement, and "appears to have reduced the colla parte writing in the winds throughout the work", according to Gary Smith.

The numbers for Mozart's Symphonies Nos. 38 through 41 have not been adjusted because of this symphony.

The score calls for 2 oboes, 2 horns in G and C, and strings; performances tend to include bassoons (always in unison with the cellos except for significant passages in the Adagio), which were part of Michael Haydn's original score but left out by Mozart, and a harpsichord playing figured bass, based on the cello line. The flute is only used for the first section of the slow movement.
