= Symphony No. 14 (Mozart) =

1771 symphony be W. A. Mozart

- by W. A. Mozart
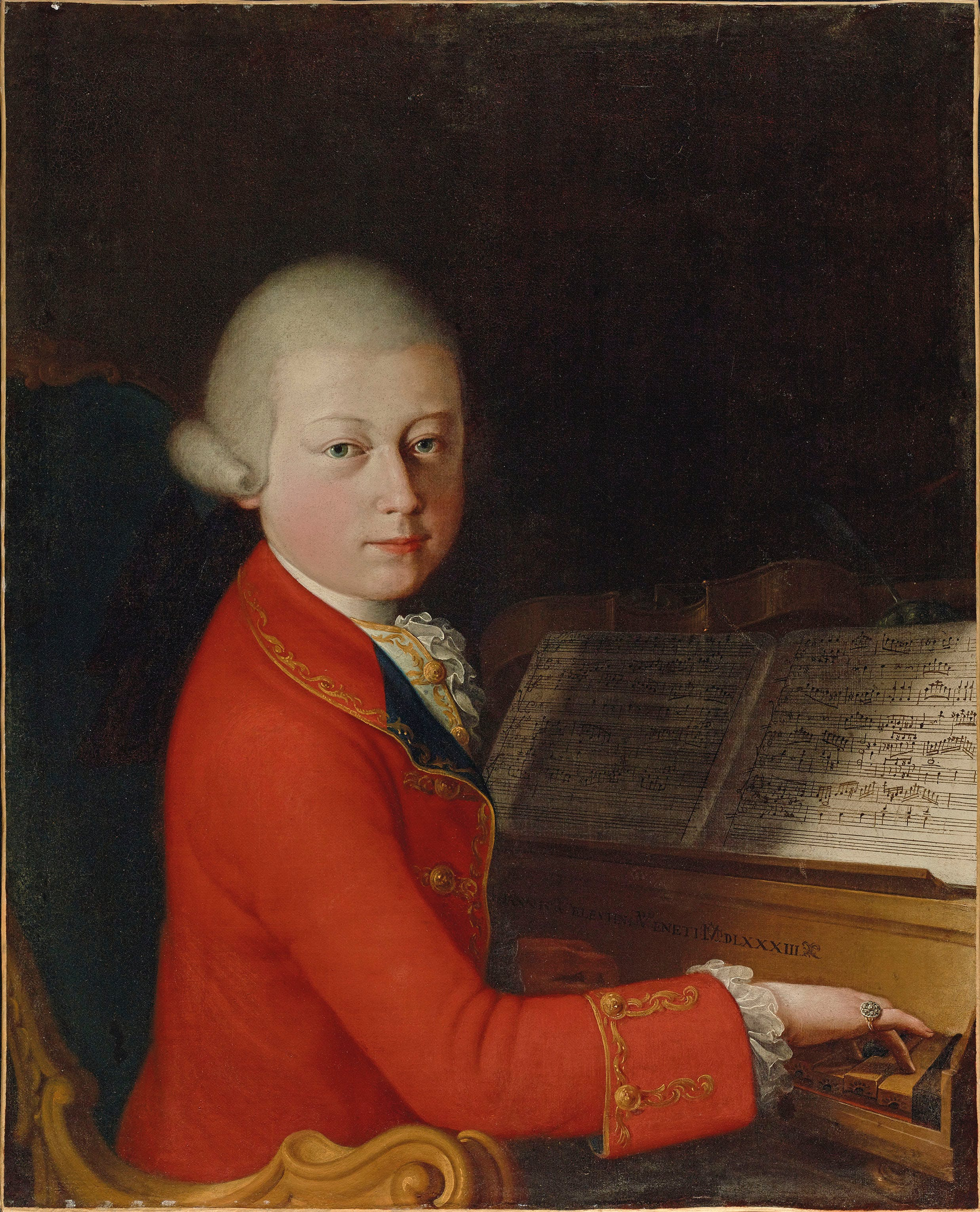
- 1770 Verona portrait of Mozart
- Key: A major
- Catalogue: K. 114
- Composed: Salzburg, 1771
- Duration: c. 15 minutes
- Movements: 4
- Scoring: Orchestra with continuo

Symphony No. 14 in A major, K. 114, is a symphony composed by Wolfgang Amadeus Mozart on December 30, 1771, when Mozart was fifteen years old, and a fortnight after the death of the Archbishop Sigismund von Schrattenbach. The piece was written in Salzburg between the composer's second and third trips to Italy. Mozart was also influenced by J. C. Bach's "Italianate" style of composition".

Musicologist Jens Peter Larsen called the symphony "One of [Mozart's] most inspired symphonies of the period... a fine example of the fusion of Viennese symphonic traditions with distinctly Italian cantabile."

== Music ==
The symphony is scored for two flutes, two oboes (2nd movement only), two horns in A, strings (with divided violas in the first and second movements), and continuo.

It has four movements:

1. Allegro moderato, A major, 2/2
2. Andante, D major, 3/4
3. Menuetto – Trio, A major, 3/4 (Trio in A minor)
4. Molto allegro, A major, 2/4
