= Symphony, K. 45b (Mozart) =

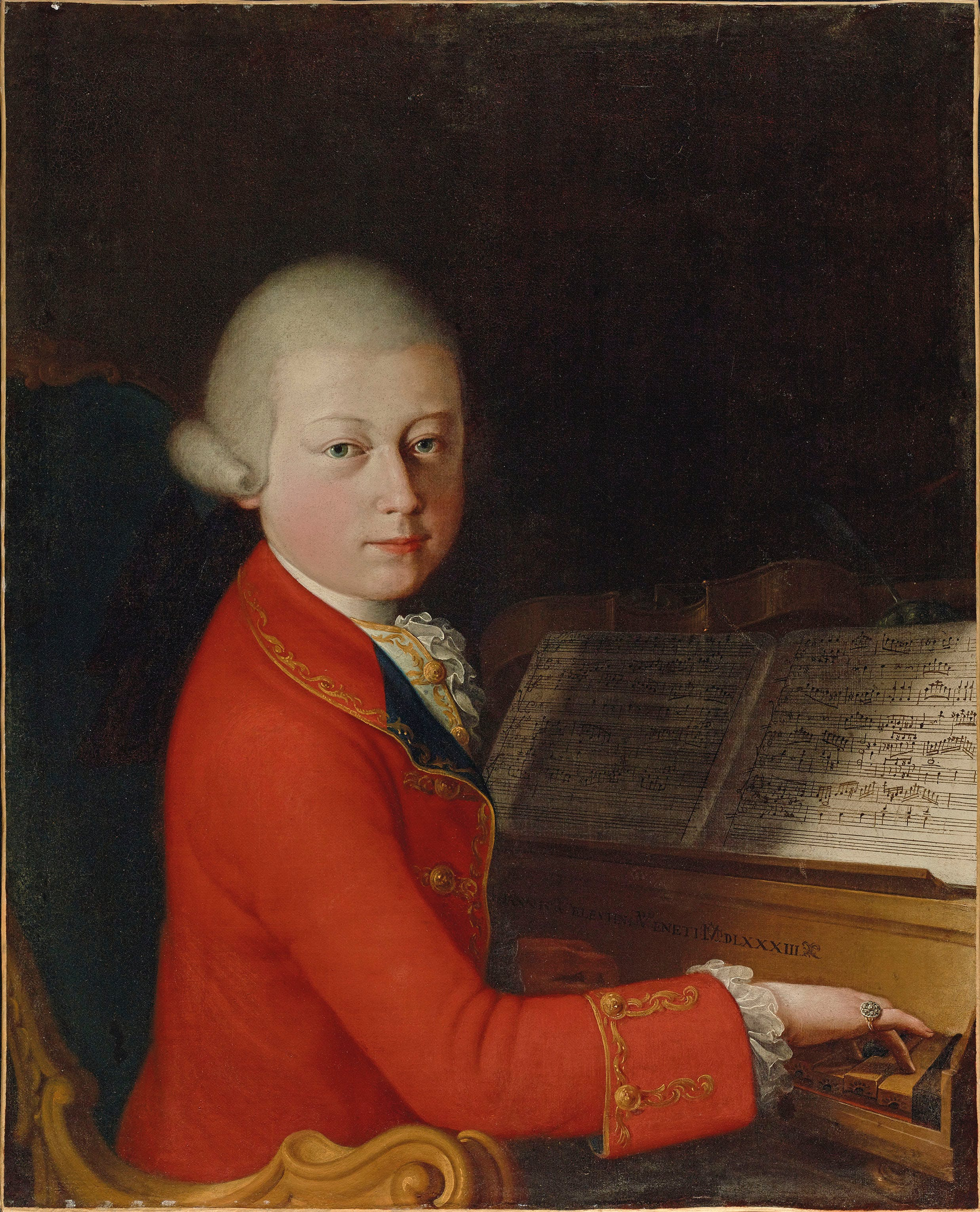
1770 Verona portrait of Mozart

The Symphony in B♭ major "No. 55", K. Anh. 214/45b, was probably written by Wolfgang Amadeus Mozart in early 1768 in Salzburg.

The symphony is scored for two oboes, two horns and strings. In contemporary orchestras, it was also usual to include bassoons and harpsichord if they were available in the orchestra to reinforce the bass line and act as the continuo. The duration is approximately 13 minutes.

The symphony consists of the following movements:

1. Allegro, 3/4
2. Andante, 2/4
3. Menuetto, 3/4
4. Allegro, 2/4

This work was only known to Ludwig Ritter von Köchel as an incipit in the catalogue of Breitkopf & Härtel, and thus it was placed in the Anhang as K. Anh. 214. Alfred Einstein then discovered a set of parts in the Berlin State Library with the title "Synfonia Ex Bb...Del Sigr. cavaliere Amadeo Wolfgango Mozart Maestro di concerto di S.A. á Salisburgo". Wolfgang became the Concertmaster to the Archbishop of Salzburg in November 1769, and was given the title "cavaliere" in July 1770, but as this is a later copy, this information cannot be used for dating purposes. Einstein believed the symphony to date from early 1768 on stylistic grounds; Neal Zaslaw and Gerhard Allroggen believe even earlier dates to also be possible, and Zaslaw dated the symphony cautiously to Salzburg in 1767. Einstein also believed that the symphonies in the catalogue of Breitkopf & Härtel were sent by Leopold Mozart to be published.

The Alte Mozart-Ausgabe (published 1879–1882) gives the numbering sequence 1–41 for the 41 numbered symphonies. The unnumbered symphonies (some, including K. 45b, published in supplements to the Alte-Mozart Ausgabe until 1910) are sometimes given numbers in the range 42 to 56, even though they were written earlier than Mozart's Symphony No. 41 (written in 1788). The symphony K. 45b is given the number 55 in this numbering scheme.
