= Symphony No. 20 (Mozart) =

1772 composition by Wolfgang Amadeus Mozart

- by W. A. Mozart
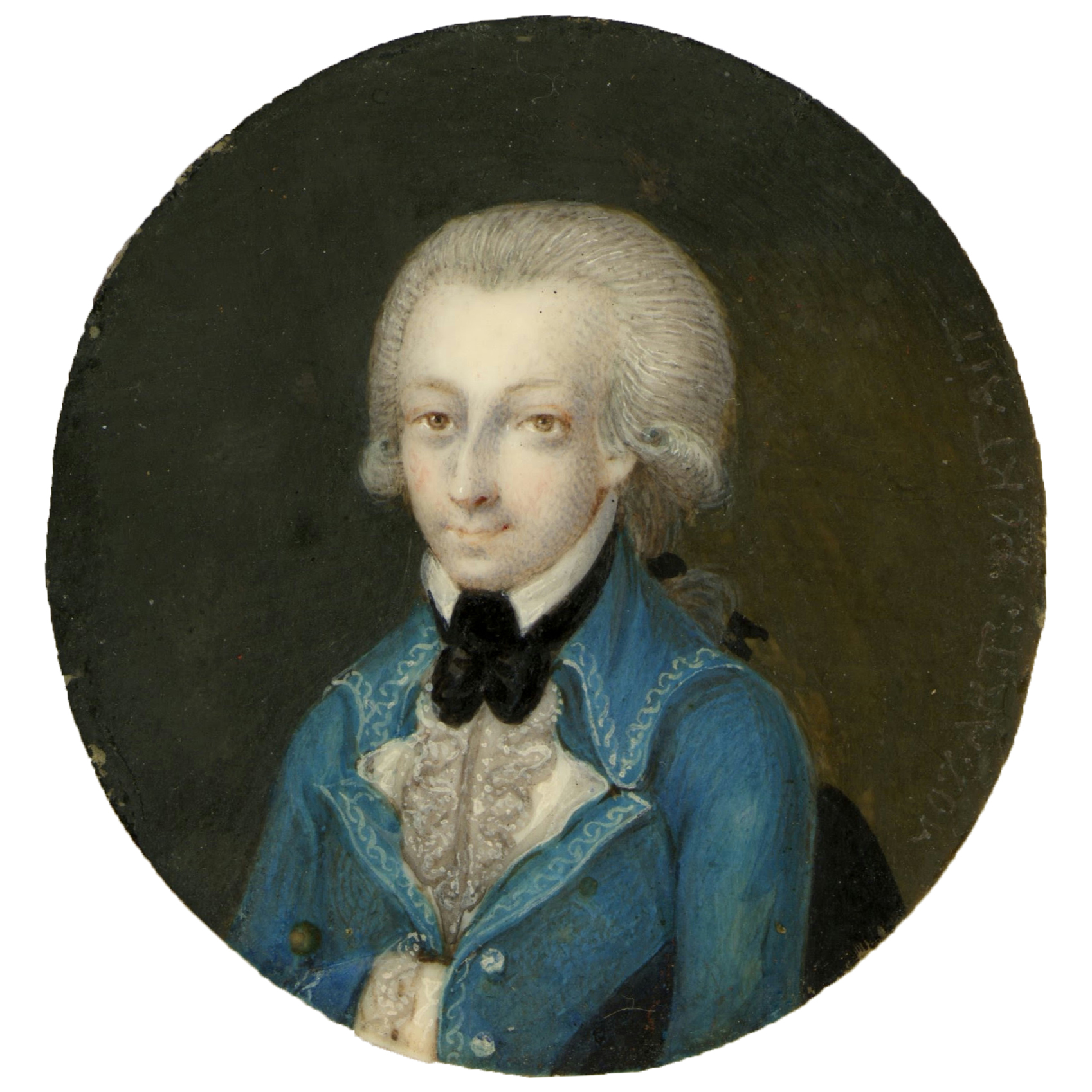
- Mozart in 1773, portrait by Martin Knoller
- Key: D major
- Catalogue: K. 133
- Composed: Salzburg, July 1772
- Duration: c. 22 minutes
- Movements: 4
- Scoring: Orchestra

Symphony No. 20 in D major, K. 133, was composed by Wolfgang Amadeus Mozart in July 1772, when Mozart was sixteen years old. This symphony is one of many written during the period Mozart stayed in Salzburg, between two trips to Italy. Compared to other symphonies Mozart wrote in this period, the scoring is extravagant, featuring two trumpets in addition to the standard oboes, horns, and strings. The key of D major, which is a key often reserved for ceremonial music, is well suited to the presence of these trumpets.

== Structure ==
The symphony is scored for one flute, two oboes, two horns, two trumpets and strings.

There are four movements:

1. Allegro
2. Andante
3. Menuetto – Trio
4. [Allegro]

The first movement, in D major and 4/4 time, is written in sonata allegro form, with the notable deviation of the recapitulation being the mirror image of the exposition. That is, the recapitulation starts with the second theme, and Mozart waits until the very end to unveil the return of the first theme. He does so by first bringing the theme in softly with the strings, then repeating with the strings now doubled by the trumpets.

The second movement, in A major and 2/4, features strings with a solo flute, which typically doubles the first violin one octave higher. The violins play with mutes throughout the movement, and the bass part is played pizzicato. These features, in combination, give the movement a delicate texture.

The minuet in D major starts boldly. A more subdued trio in G major written primarily for strings (with a bit of oboe).

The fourth movement, also in D major, is a long dance in 12/8 time cast in sonata-allegro form. Though Mozart himself did not label the tempo of the fourth movement, the character of the piece and the standard symphonic form of the time indicates that Mozart probably intended the piece to go at an "allegro" tempo.
