= Symphony No. 35 (Mozart) =

1782 composition by W. A. Mozart

- Haffner
- by W. A. Mozart
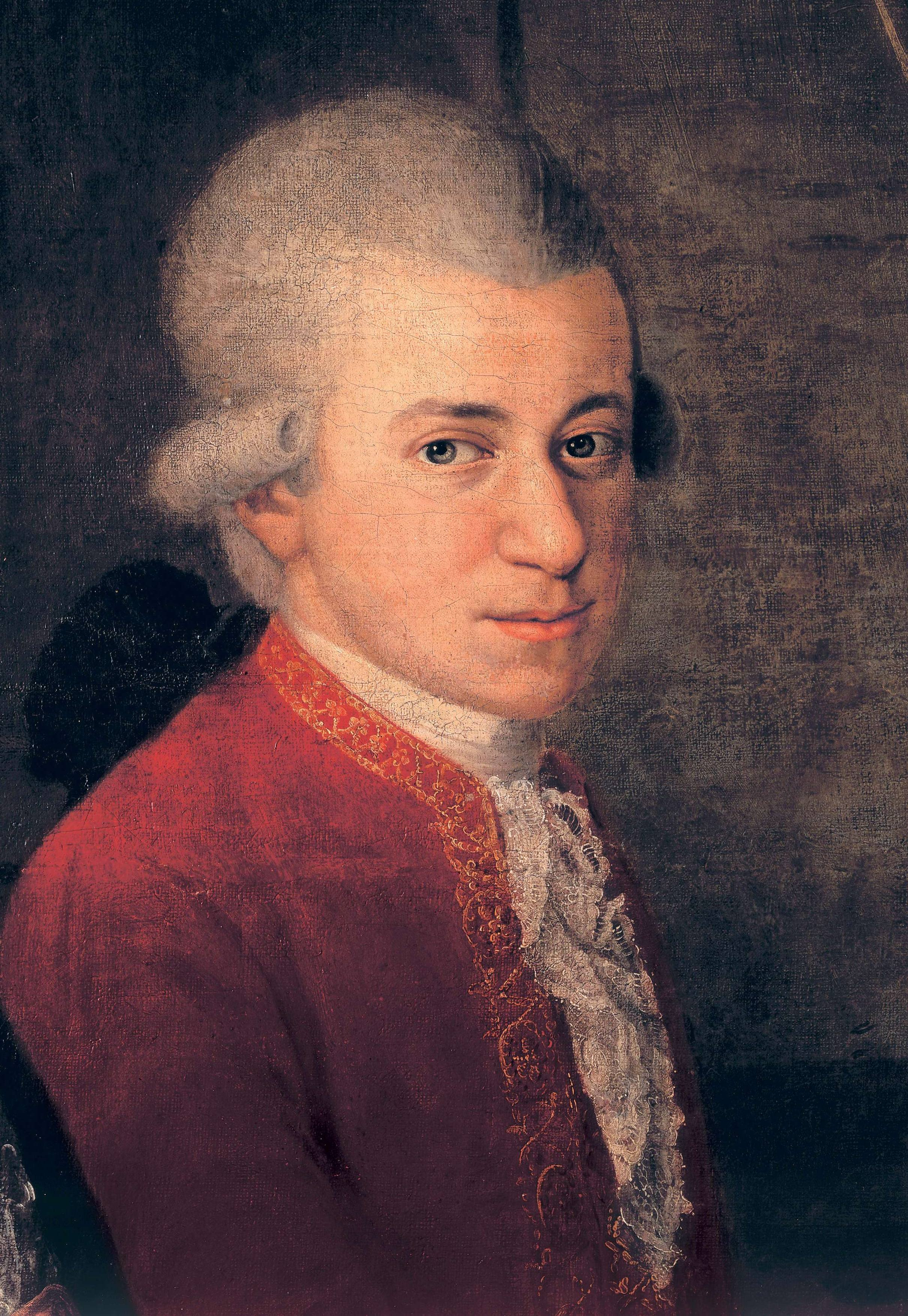
- Portrait of Mozart in 1780–81
- Key: D major
- Catalogue: K. 385
- Composed: 1782
- Duration: c. 18 minutes
- Movements: 4
- Scoring: Orchestra

Symphony No. 35 in D major, K. 385, also known as the Haffner Symphony, was composed by Wolfgang Amadeus Mozart in 1782. It was commissioned by the Haffners, a prominent Salzburg family, for the occasion of the ennoblement of Sigmund Haffner the Younger. The Haffner Symphony should not be confused with the eight-movement Haffner Serenade, another piece Mozart wrote on commission from the same family in 1776.

== Background ==
The Haffner Symphony did not start its life as a symphony, but rather as a serenade to be used as background music for the ennoblement of Sigmund Haffner. The Mozarts knew the Haffners through Sigmund Haffner's father, Sigmund Haffner the Elder, who had been mayor of Salzburg and who had helped them out on their early tours of Europe. The elder Haffner died in 1772, but the families remained in contact. In 1776, the younger Haffner commissioned a serenade for the wedding of Marie Elizabeth Haffner to Franz Xavier Spath. This work became the famous Haffner Serenade, which was so successful that, when the younger Sigmund Haffner was to be ennobled, it was only natural that Mozart was called upon to write the music for the occasion. The request to write music actually came via Mozart's father, Leopold, on 20 July 1782 when Mozart had no spare time. Mozart was "up to his eyeballs with work". Not only was he teaching, but he also had to rearrange the score of his opera Die Entführung aus dem Serail before 28 July. In addition to these demands, his proposed marriage to Constanze Weber was threatened by a number of complications, including moving to a house near the Hohe Brücke, Vienna. Nevertheless, Mozart worked on the music, and sent it through section by section to his father. What Mozart wrote at this time was a new serenade – a completely different work from the serenade presented four years earlier – with an introductory march and two minuets. According to historical evidence, it is quite possible that Mozart did not actually meet his father's deadline to have the music completed by Sigmund Haffner's ennoblement. Mozart later reworked this music into what we now know as the Haffner Symphony.

At the end of December 1782, Mozart decided to present music from the new Haffner serenade at a concert. After asking his father to send the score of the serenade back again, Leopold was amazed at its quality, given the fact that it was composed in so short a time. He set to work to make a number of alterations to the score in order to convert the new Haffner serenade into the Haffner symphony. These alterations included dropping the introductory march (K. 385a) and one of the two minuets (now lost). In addition, the repeat signs were removed from the end of the first movement's exposition. Mozart also gave the Haffner Symphony a fuller sound by adding two flutes and two clarinets to the woodwind section of the first and last movements. These added woodwind parts are not new melodic material, but simply a doubling of octaves within the woodwinds.

The Haffner Symphony, as we know it today, received its first performance on 23 March 1783 at the Vienna Burgtheater. At the concert, Mozart opened matters with the first three movements of this symphony, the aria "Se il padre perdei" from Idomeneo (described in his letter to his father of March 29 that year as his Munich opera), piano concerto no. 13 K. 415, a scena K. 369 (a genre related to the concert aria), the concertante movements from his last Finalmusik K. 320, his piano concerto K. 175 (with a new finale), and another scena, "Parto, m'affretto" (from the opera Lucio Silla, which he had composed for Milan); at this point he improvised a fugue "because the Emperor was present" and then two sets of variations (K. 398 on an aria by Paisiello and K. 455 on an aria by Gluck). After this, Madame (Aloysia) Lange sang his new rondo (K. 416?) and then to finish the concert, the last movement of the Haffner Symphony was played. The performance of the Haffner Symphony at this concert proved very successful.

Cuyler (1995) classifies the Haffner, Linz (No. 36) and Prague (No. 38) symphonies as "three symphonies that transcend all his former symphonic works."

The autograph manuscript currently resides in the archives of the Morgan Library & Museum in New York City.

Anton Reicha used the theme which opens the symphony for a fugue in his set of 36 Fugues.

== Instrumentation ==
The symphony is scored for two flutes, two oboes, two clarinets in A, two bassoons, two horns in D and G, two trumpets in D, timpani, and strings.

== Analysis by key and movements ==
I. Allegro con spirito

II. Andante

III. Menuetto

IV. Presto
Courtesy of Musopen

=== Key ===
The Haffner Symphony is in the key of D major. Mozart's choice of key for the Haffner Symphony is interesting, according to Cuyler, because "the key of D major, which was so felicitous for the winds, served Mozart more often than any other key, even C major, for his symphonies", including the Paris (No. 31) and Prague (No. 38) symphonies.

=== Movements ===
The symphony is in four movements:

1. Allegro con spirito, 4/4
2. Andante in G major, 2/4
3. Menuetto – Trio in A major, 3/4
4. Presto, 2/2

==== I. Allegro con spirito ====
When communicating with his father Leopold, Mozart stated that this movement was to be played with fire. The movement is in sonata form with a short development section. The exposition begins with a fake slow-introduction with all instruments in unison, until the rhythm of the 4th bar reveals the quick tempo of the movement. The second subject is similar in melodic material and rhythm to the first subject, recalling the monothematic sonata movements of Haydn (e.g. Symphony No. 104).

Mozart places no repeat signs at the end of the exposition. This goes against the standard sonata form convention of the day, but is something that he also does in the three big symphonies which precede the Haffner (Nos. 31, 33 and 34).

The development begins by hinting at D minor (bars 95–104), before settling on the key of F♯ minor (bars 105–118). A string of consecutive dominant sevenths (bars 119–128) then returns the music to D major to begin the recapitulation. The recapitulation is similar to the exposition with the exception of expected differences in the transition passage.

==== II. Andante ====
The G major second movement provides a welcome relief with its slow, graceful melodies announced by the woodwind section. The movement is in an abridged sonata form. Instead of a development, a brief chorale-like passage is presented by the woodwinds. The rhythmic structures of the first subject theme and the second subject theme provide a subtle, but excellent contrast to each other. Whilst both themes are quite similar in character, the first subject theme has a slow-moving accompaniment based upon sixteenth notes, whereas the second subject theme has a busier accompaniment of thirty-second notes. The brief, chorale-like passage which replaces the development is clearly punctuated by the use of syncopated accompaniment by the violins and violas. This movement has been summarized by some as being delicate and elaborate, but definitely relaxing.

==== III. Menuetto – Trio ====
The D major minuet provides a bright change of atmosphere from the previous slow, serious "Andante" movement. One may notice when listening to this movement the constant tug between two main chords – the tonic and dominant keys. Only three times do we see chords other than the tonic or dominant.

Also notable is that the dynamics for the whole "Menuetto" is marked forte. However, in both instances where chord IV and vi appear, Mozart marked these sections piano. These changes produce a pleasant contrast, both melodically and dynamically.

Leading straight on from the "Menuetto", the "Trio" provides a complement to the character of this "Menuetto". As indicated by Mozart in the score, the "Trio" immediately follows the "Menuetto" without a moment of silence. Stepping up into the key of A major, it soon becomes apparent that the "Trio" is also in Ternary form, like the "Menuetto". One may note the fact that no sections of the "Trio" are marked as forte. All is marked as piano, with the exception of bars 33–36, and 43–44, where Mozart has indicated a small crescendo. Perhaps to supplement the fact of any clear contrast in dynamics, Mozart has freely used sforzandos throughout the "Trio". The same type of suspense and resolution is present in the "Trio" as that found in the "Menuetto". In fact, Mozart takes a step further in the "Trio" by adding a pedal note on the dominant. This dominant pedal then subtly slips back into the tonic by means of a chromatic B sharp. When comparing the character of the "Menuetto" with that of the "Trio", a number of individual "personalities" are apparent. The "Menuetto" is brighter and lighter; whereas the "Trio" creates a more flowing effect. Also notable is that Mozart used chromaticism freely in the "Trio", but limited its use within the "Menuetto".

==== IV. Presto ====
The last movement, labeled "Presto", maintains just as much fire as the first movement. According to Steinberg, this "Presto" movement not only bears a similar atmosphere to the overture to Le nozze di Figaro, but also provides a reminiscence of Osmin's comic aria "O wie will ich triumphieren" from Die Entführung aus dem Serail. This opera was first performed just two weeks before the composition of this finale. Hence, it may explain why there exist such similarities. When providing his father, Leopold, with performance instructions for the "Presto", his advice was that this movement should be played "as fast as possible". Although the "Presto" begins at a quiet, brisk pace, the listener is immediately arrested by three beats of silence, followed by the full orchestra performing at a clear forte level in bar 9. Such musical surprises appear throughout this movement. Like the first movement, this movement is in the key of D major, and the form of the "Presto" movement is clearly in sonata-rondo form. Permeated with silences, rapid dynamic shifts, and a bright grace note passage near the closing of the movement, one may expect the unexpected.

=== Length ===
The Haffner Symphony usually runs somewhere around 20 minutes in length. A recording by George Szell with the Cleveland Orchestra (Sony SBK 46333) runs 19:11 (with no repeats observed in the andante and an otherwise non-existing exposition repeat added to the first movement); one by Iona Brown with the Academy of St Martin in the Fields (Haenssler CD 94.003) is 21:09 (both repeats in the andante observed); and one by Sir Neville Marriner also with the same ensemble (1984, Philips 420 486-2) runs 21:34 (with both repeats observed in the andante and an otherwise non-existing exposition repeat added to the first movement). Karl Böhm's acclaimed 1960 recording with the Berlin Philharmonic (Deutsche Grammophon 00289 477 6134), by contrast, runs 17:47 (with no repeats observed in the andante).

== Citations ==
=== Sources ===
- Abert, Hermann (2007). W. A. Mozart. Yale University Press.
- Cuyler, L. (1995). The Symphony (2nd ed.). Michigan: Harmonie Park Press.
- J. A. W. (April 1972). "Symphony in D major, K. 385". Music & Letters. 53 (2): 231–232.
- Robbins Landon, H. C., ed. (1996). The Mozart Compendium. London: Thames & Hudson.
- Rushton, J. 2007, "Wolfgang Amadeus Mozart" from Grove Music Online.
- Sadie, S. (ed.) 1985, The Cambridge Music Guide, Cambridge University Press, Cambridge.
- Steinberg, Michael (1995). The Symphony – A Listener's Guide. Oxford: Oxford University Press.
- Wilson, B. E. 1969, "Haffner Symphony; Facsimile of the Original Manuscript Owned by the National Orchestral Association, New York", Notes, vol. 26, no. 2., pp. 350–351.
- Zaslaw, N. 1989, Mozart's Symphonies: Context, Performance, Practice, Reception, Oxford University Press, Oxford.
