= Symphony No. 8 (Mozart) =

1768 symphony by W. A. Mozart

- by W. A. Mozart
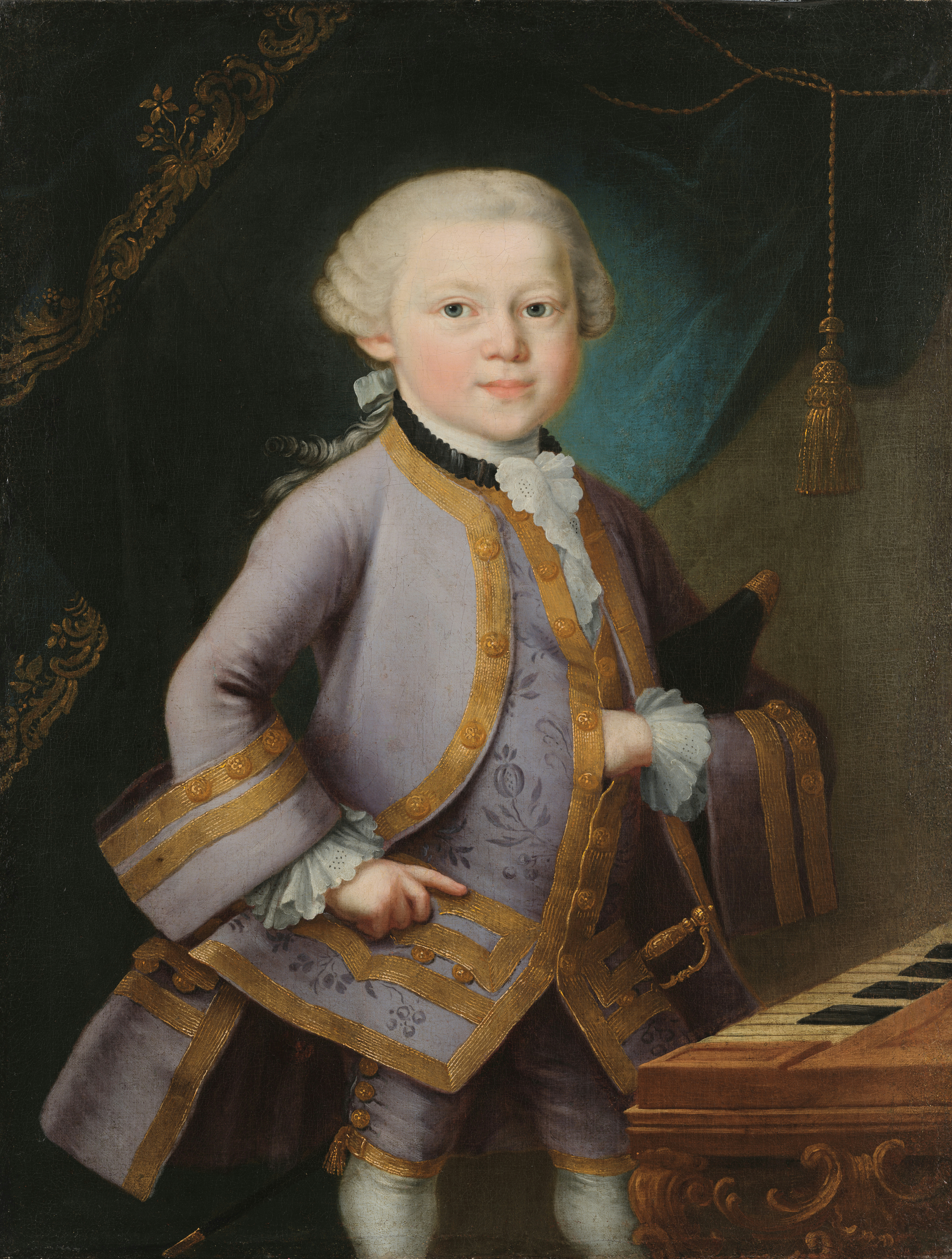
- Portrait of Mozart, 1763
- Key: D major
- Catalogue: K. 48
- Composed: Vienna, December 1768
- Movements: 4
- Scoring: Orchestra with continuo

The Symphony No. 8 in D major, K. 48, by Wolfgang Amadeus Mozart is dated 13 December 1768. Mozart wrote the symphony in Vienna, when he was twelve years old, at a time when he and his family were already due to have returned home to Salzburg. In a letter to his friend in Salzburg, Johann Lorenz Hagenauer, Leopold Mozart says of the delay that "we could not bring our affairs to a conclusion earlier, even though I endeavored strenuously to do so." The autograph of the Symphony No. 8 is today preserved in the Berlin State Library.

== Structure ==
The symphony is scored for two oboes, two horns in D, two trumpets in D, timpani and strings. The inclusion of trumpets and timpani is unusual for Mozart's early symphonies. It has been described as a "ceremonial work".

There are four movements:

1. Allegro, 3/4
2. Andante, 2/4 in G major
3. Menuetto and Trio, 3/4
4. Molto allegro, 12/8

The first movement begins with downward leaps on the violins and follows with scale figures. These sets of figures alternate between strings and winds.

The second movement is for strings alone and begins with a narrow melodic range which expands toward the end.

The third movement is a minuet full of rapid string passages, and includes the trumpets and timpani, but not during the Trio.

The final movement is a gigue, whose main theme unusually does not end the movement.
