= Symphony, K. 111+120 (Mozart) =

1771 symphony by W. A. Mozart

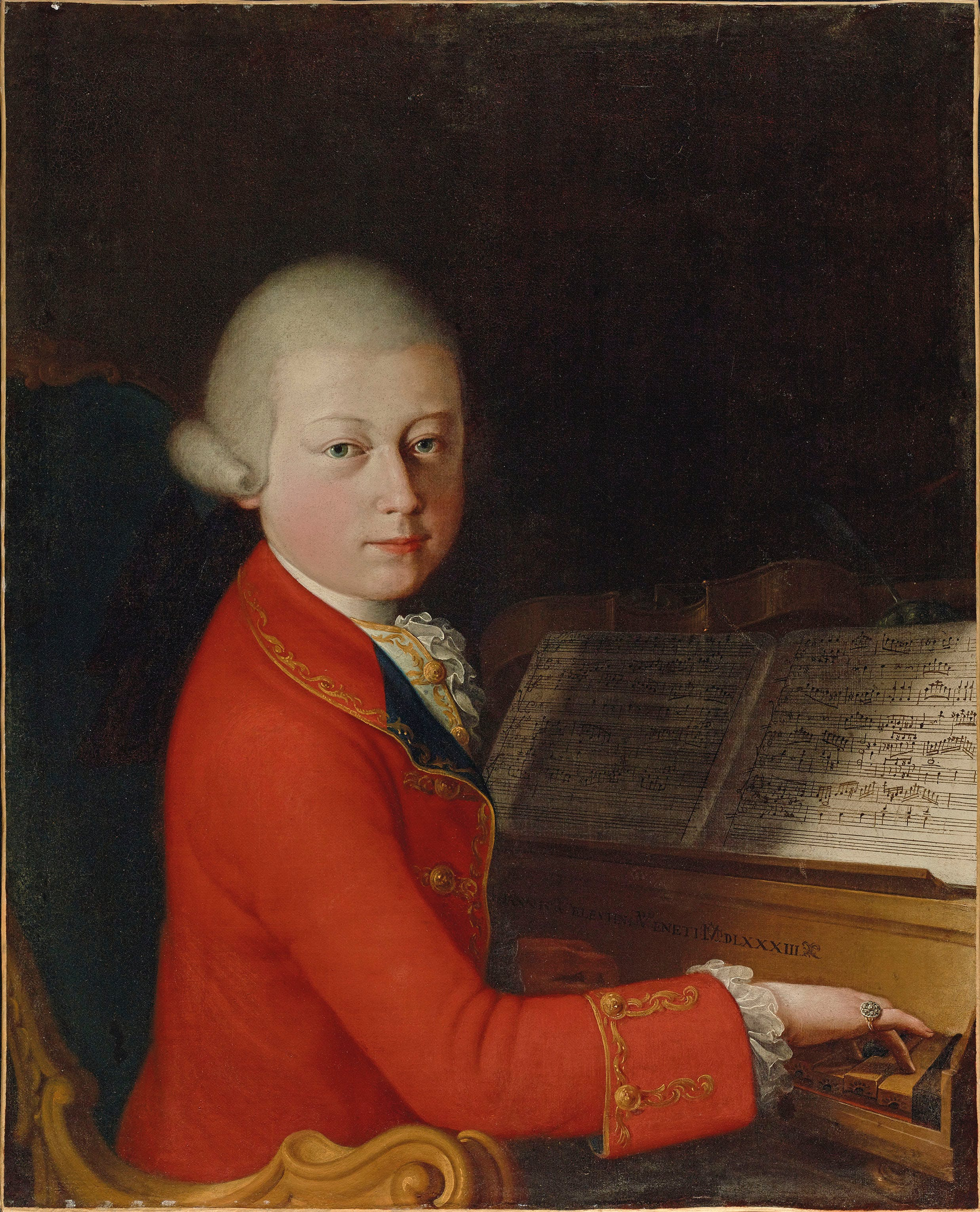
1770 Verona portrait of Mozart

The Symphony in D major "No. 48", K. 111+120, was composed by Wolfgang Amadeus Mozart in 1771. The first two movements are from the overture to the opera Ascanio in Alba, K. 111, and the last movement, K. 120/111a, was composed separately.

The symphony is scored for two flutes, two oboes, two horns in D, two trumpets in D, timpani and strings. The trumpets and timpani are silent for the second movement.

The symphony consists of the following movements:

1. Allegro assai, 4/4
2. Andante grazioso, 3/8
3. Presto, 3/8

The Alte Mozart-Ausgabe (published 1879–1882) gives the numbering sequence 1–41 for the 41 numbered symphonies. The unnumbered symphonies (some, including K. 120, published in supplements to the Alte-Mozart Ausgabe until 1910) are sometimes given numbers in the range 42 to 56, even though they were written earlier than Mozart's Symphony No. 41 (written in 1788). The symphony K. 111+120 is given the number 48 in this numbering scheme.

The final (Presto) movement of this symphony is also employed as the final movement of the Musik zu einer Pantomime: Pantalon und Colombine (Music to a Pantomime) in D major, K. 446/416d (1783, incomplete) in the completion and orchestration by Franz Beyer (recorded by Sir Neville Marriner and the Academy of St Martin in the Fields for The Complete Mozart Edition).
