= Symphony No. 4 (Mozart) =

1765 composition by W. A. Mozart

- by W. A. Mozart
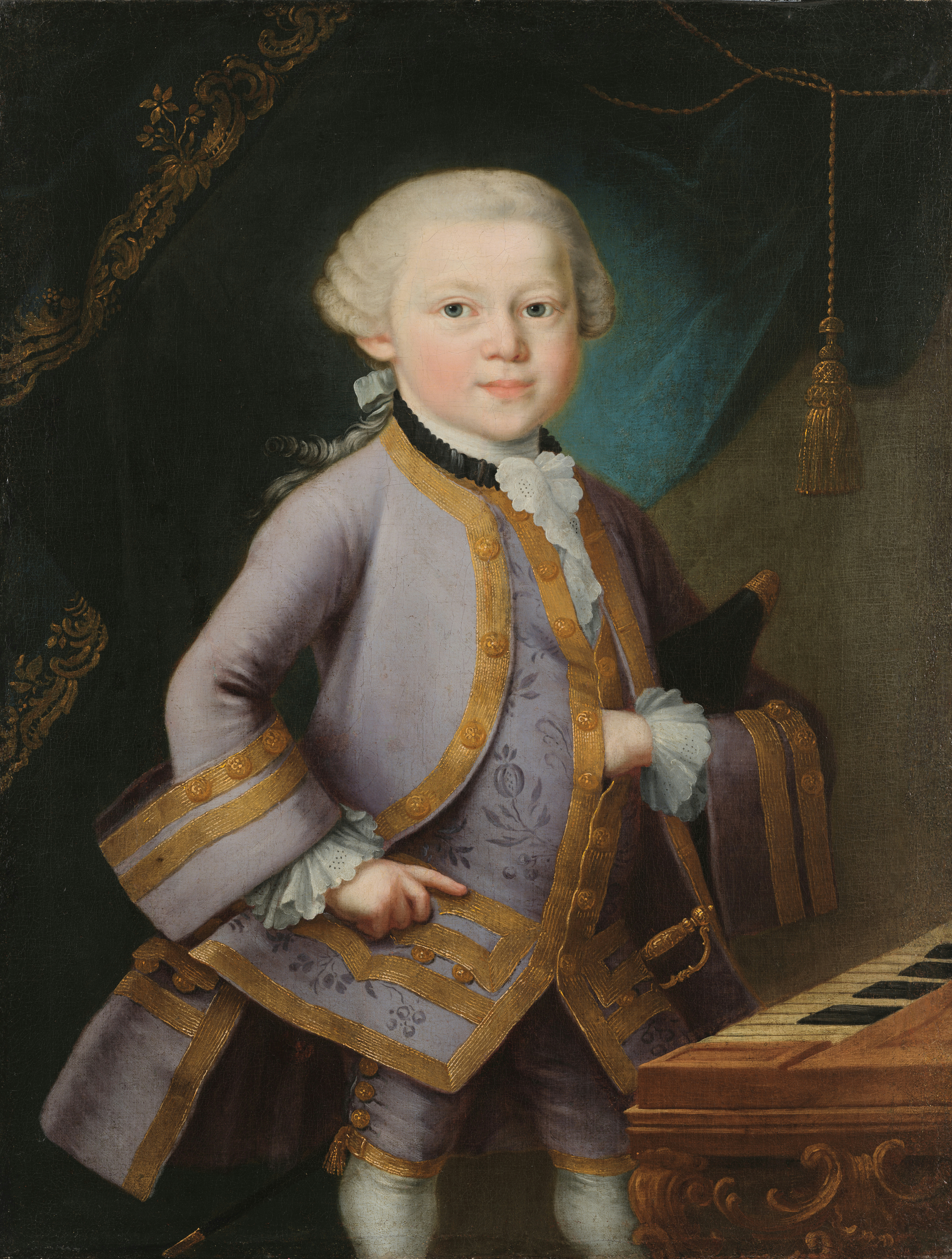
- 1763 portrait of Mozart at age seven, painted before he composed the symphony
- Key: D major
- Catalogue: K. 19
- Composed: 1765, London
- Performed: Little Haymarket Theatre, London
- Duration: c. 12 minutes
- Movements: 3
- Scoring: Orchestra with continuo

The Symphony No. 4 in D major, K. 19, by Wolfgang Amadeus Mozart was composed in London during the Mozart family's Grand Tour of Europe in 1765, when Mozart was nine years old.

== Background ==
Even though the original of Mozart's manuscript has not survived, the set of parts written in the hand of his father, Leopold Mozart, is preserved in the Bavarian State Library in Munich. It is known today that the early symphonies by young Mozart were performed at the public concerts in the Little Haymarket Theatre in London. It is therefore possible that these parts were written for one of these public performances, although Neal Zaslaw concludes that the work was composed or at least completed in The Hague.

== Structure ==
The work is scored for two oboes, two horns in D, strings, and basso continuo.

There are three movements, as was standard in the early classical music era in which the child Mozart wrote, in the typical fast–slow–fast configuration. They are as follows:

1. Allegro, D major, (Common time), 78 bars
2. Andante, G major, 2/4, 45 bars
3. Presto, D major, 3/8, 106 bars

== Discography ==
Below is an incomplete list of recordings of the symphony:

Year	Conductor	Orchestra	Label
1973	Neville Marriner	Academy of St. Martin in the Fields	Philips Classics
1991	Charles Mackerras	Prague Chamber Orchestra	Telarc
1995	Nicholas Ward	Northern Chamber Orchestra	Naxos
2013	Ádám Fischer	Danish National Chamber Orchestra	Dacapo Records
2018	Ian Page	The Mozartists	Signum Records
