= Symphony, K. 76 (Mozart) =

Composition by W. A. Mozart

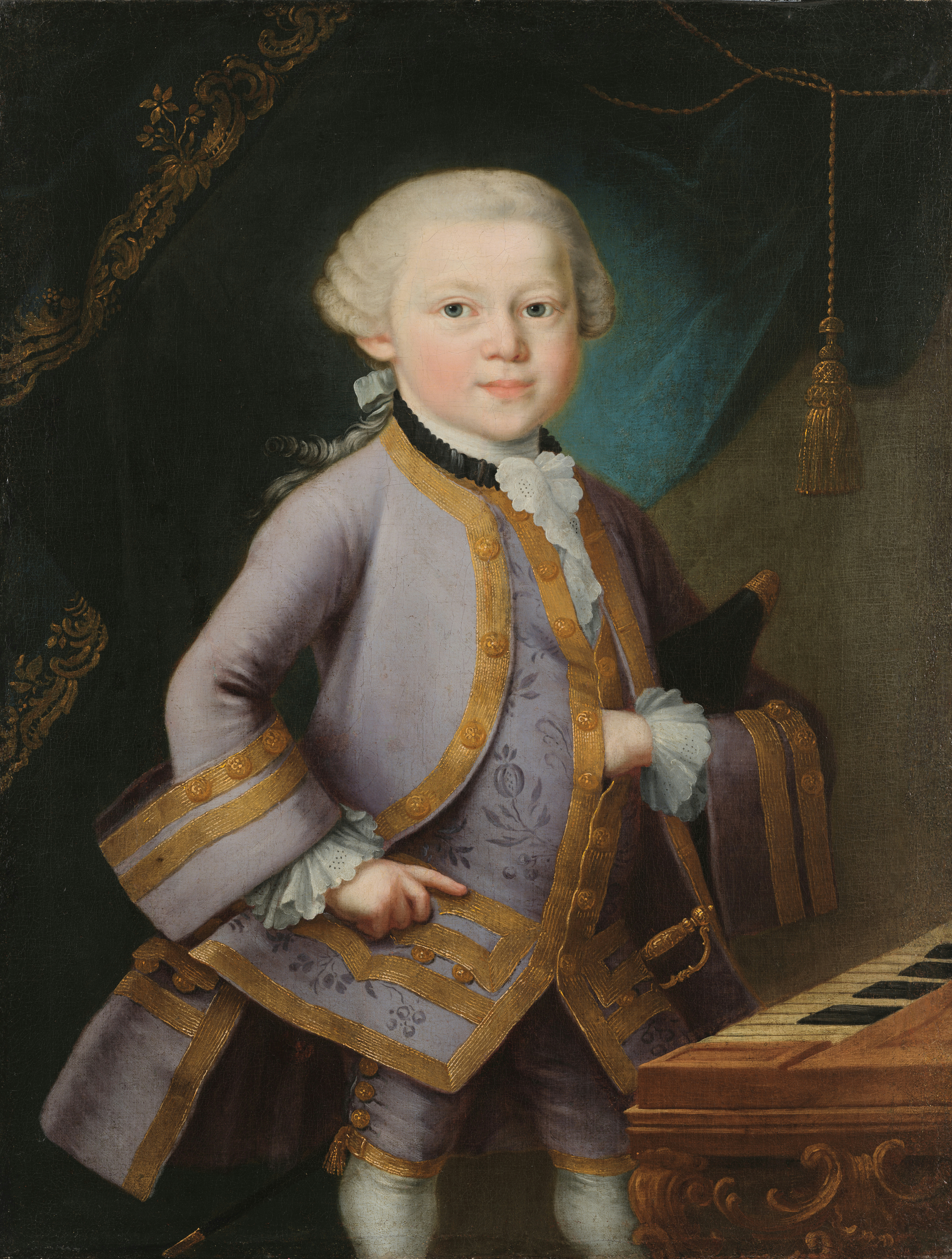
1763 portrait of Mozart

The Symphony "No. 43" in F major, K. 76/42a, was probably written by Wolfgang Amadeus Mozart.

The symphony is scored for two oboes, two horns in F, two bassoons and strings. The oboes are silent for the second movement. The inclusion of the bassoons is notable as in contemporary orchestras bassoon parts were not usually written in and simply doubled the cellos and double basses. In contemporary orchestras, it was also usual to include the harpsichord if they were available in the orchestra to reinforce the bass line and act as the basso continuo. The duration is approximately 15 minutes.

The symphony consists of the following movements:

1. Allegro maestoso, 4/4
2. Andante, 3/4 in B-flat major
3. Menuetto, 3/4 - Trio (D minor)
4. Allegro, 2/4

The autograph has been lost. The only source for this symphony was a set of parts in the archives of the publisher Breitkopf & Härtel, which was destroyed during World War II.

The Alte Mozart-Ausgabe (published 1879–1882) gives the numbering sequence 1–41 for the 41 numbered symphonies. The unnumbered symphonies (some, including K. 76, published in supplements to the Alte-Mozart Ausgabe until 1910) are sometimes given numbers in the range 42 to 56, even though they were written earlier than Mozart's Symphony No. 41 (written in 1788). The symphony K. 76 is given the number 43 in this numbering scheme.

== Origins and authorship ==
- Otto Jahn, in his Mozart biography, refers to the discovery of 20 symphonies attributed to Mozart in the archives of Breitkopf & Härtel. Köchel agreed with this view and considered K. 76 authentic Mozart. Jahn's write-up was based on the "Mozartiana Collection" of Johann André, in which ten of the aforementioned 20 symphonies are included (indicating that they were considered authentic), because they were sent directly from Constanze Mozart, Mozart's widow. Two of these works are symphonic versions of the overtures to Lucio Silla, K. 135 and Il sogno di Scipione, K. 126, increasing the likelihood that the other eight works are also authentic. Jahn dated K. 76 as "177?", while Köchel dated it as "perhaps 1769".
- Wyzewa and Saint-Foix (1912) dated the symphony between 1 December 1766 and 1 March 1767. They compared the first movement of the symphony with the overture to Die Schuldigkeit des ersten Gebots, K. 35, and Mozart's earlier symphonies and concluded that K. 76 was written before the overture, perhaps in December 1766. They considered it to be "written with great care for his teacher and compatriots to prove what he had learned on the grand tour (to London, Paris, Holland, etc.)" However, Zaslaw considered this interpretation "pure fantasy".
- Abert doubted the similarities described by Wyzewa and Saint-Foix, because the development of the overture to K. 35 is based on the main theme of the overture, but the development of K. 76 digresses from the main theme of the symphony. The quotation of a theme by Jean-Philippe Rameau in the last movement points to the time of the first big trip, but the (later) addition of the minuet points to southern Germany as the place of composition.
- Einstein stated that the minuet is relatively of much greater maturity than the primitive other three movements and was probably composed later. Viennese symphonies would almost always have four movements and Mozart would often adjust three-movement symphonies he composed for other places by later adding a minuet and trio, so Einstein concluded that minuet and trio was composed for a trip to Vienna. The sixth edition of the Köchel catalogue lists the time as "allegedly in autumn 1767, in Vienna".
- Gerhard Allroggen and Cliff Eisen suspect the true author of the symphony to be Leopold Mozart due to stylistic features.

Zaslaw described the symphony as "attractive", the Andante as an "irritant" and highlights the "beauty" of the minuet, but Sadie (2006) however speaks generally of "weakness", the pizzicato passages in the second movement as "cumbersome" and the harmony in the minuet "clumsy".
