= Symphony, K. 161 (Mozart) =

1772 composition by W. A. Mozart

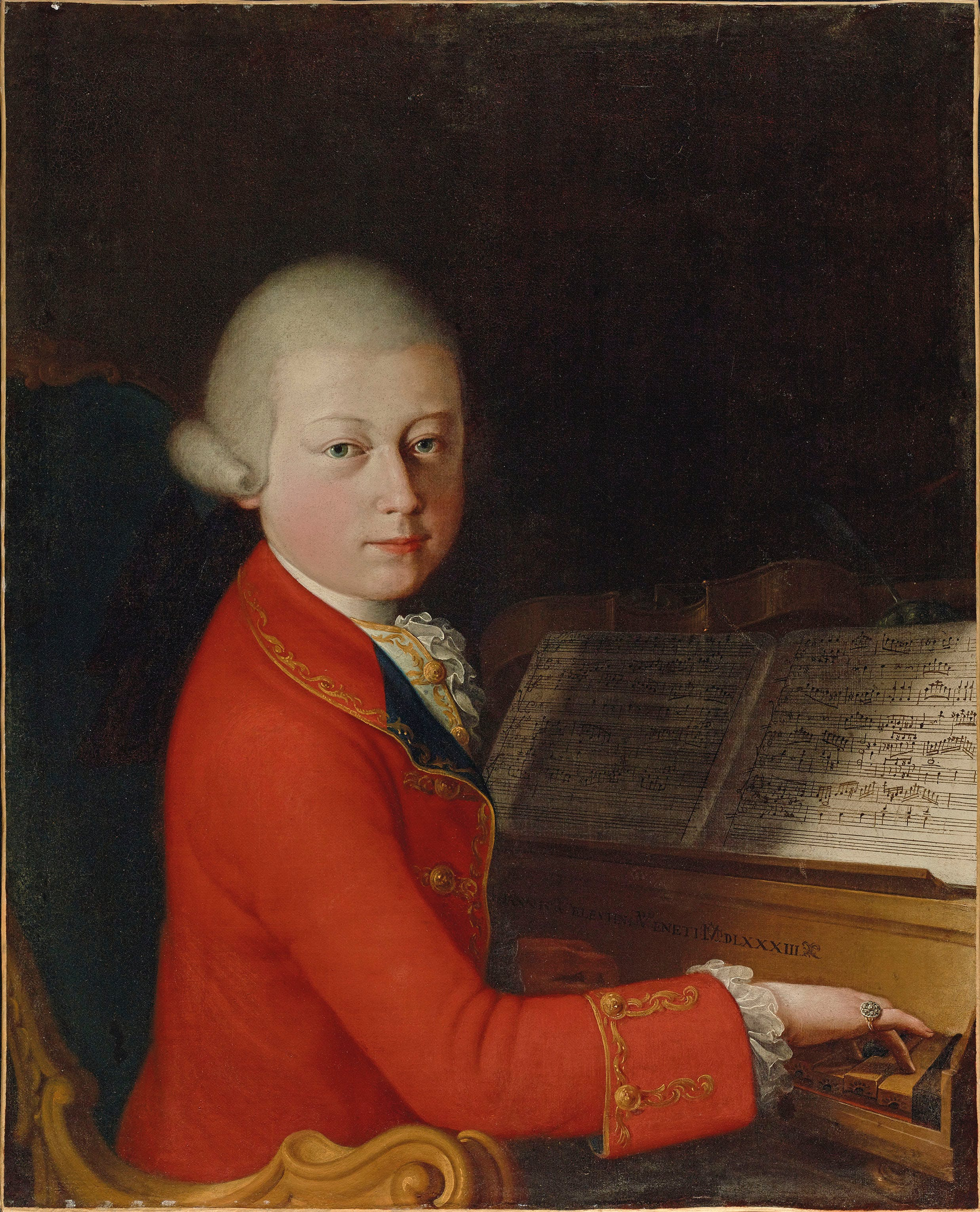
1770 Verona portrait of Mozart

The Symphony in D major "No. 50", K. 161/141a, was composed by Wolfgang Amadeus Mozart in 1772. The first two movements are from the overture to the opera Il sogno di Scipione, K. 126, and the last movement, K. 163, was composed separately. Köchel gave the entire work the number K. 161 (revised to K. 141a in later editions).

The symphony is scored for two flutes, two oboes, two natural horns in D, two trumpets in D, timpani and strings. The trumpets and timpani are silent for the second movement.

The symphony consists of the following movements:

1. Allegro moderato, 2/2
2. Andante, 3/4
3. Presto, 3/8

The Alte Mozart-Ausgabe (published 1879–1882) gives the numbering sequence 1–41 for the 41 numbered symphonies. The unnumbered symphonies (some, including K. 161/141a, published in supplements to the Alte-Mozart Ausgabe until 1910) are sometimes given numbers in the range 42 to 56, even though they were written earlier than Mozart's Symphony No. 41 (written in 1788). The symphony K. 161 is given the number 50 in this numbering scheme.
