= D major =

Major key and scale based on the note D

- Relative key: B minor
- Parallel key: D minor
- Dominant key: A major
- Subdominant key: G major

Component pitches
- D, E, F♯, G, A, B, C♯

D major is a major scale based on D, consisting of the pitches D, E, F♯, G, A, B, and C♯. Its key signature has two sharps. Its relative minor is B minor and its parallel minor is D minor.

The D major scale is:

Changes needed for the melodic and harmonic versions of the scale are written in with accidentals as necessary. The D harmonic major and melodic major scales are:

== Scale degree chords ==
The scale degree chords of D major are:

- Tonic – D major
- Supertonic – E minor
- Mediant – F-sharp minor
- Subdominant – G major
- Dominant – A major
- Submediant – B minor
- Leading tone – C-sharp diminished

== Characteristics ==
D major is well-suited to violin music because of the structure of the instrument, which is tuned G D A E. The open strings resonate sympathetically with the D string, producing a sound that is especially brilliant. This is also the case with all other orchestral strings.

Thus, it is no coincidence that many classical composers throughout the centuries have chosen to write violin concertos in D major, including those by Mozart (No. 2, 1775, No. 4, 1775); Ludwig van Beethoven (1806); Paganini (No. 1, 1817); Brahms (1878); Tchaikovsky (1878); Prokofiev (No. 1, 1917); Stravinsky (1931); and Korngold (1945).

The key is also appropriate for guitar music, with drop D tuning making two D's available as open strings. For some beginning wind instrument students, however, D major is not a very suitable key, since it transposes to E major on B♭ wind instruments, and beginning methods generally tend to avoid keys with more than three sharps.

Even so, the clarinet in B♭ is still often used for music in D major, and it is perhaps the sharpest key that is practical for the instrument. There are composers however who, in writing a piece in D minor with B♭ clarinets, will have them change to clarinets in A if the music switches to D major, two examples being Rachmaninoff's Third Piano Concerto and Beethoven's Ninth Symphony in the fourth movement.

The vast majority of tin whistles are in D, since they are often used in music with fiddles. It is a common key for pub session playing.

== History ==
In the Baroque period, D major was regarded as "the key of glory"; hence many trumpet concertos were in D major, such as those by Johann Friedrich Fasch, Gross, Molter (No. 2), Leopold Mozart, Telemann (No. 2), and Giuseppe Torelli. Many trumpet sonatas were in D major, too, such as those by Corelli, Petronio Franceschini, Purcell, and Torelli. "The Trumpet Shall Sound" and the "Hallelujah" chorus from Handel's Messiah, and his coronation anthem Zadok the Priest are in D major. In addition, Bach's Mass in B minor has D major as the relative major, and most of the major choruses in this key (Gloria, Cum Sancto Spiritu, Sanctus, Hosanna) make extensive use of trumpets.

23 of Haydn's 104 symphonies are in D major, making it the most-often used main key of his symphonies. The vast majority of Mozart's unnumbered symphonies are in D major, namely K. 66c, 81/73, 97/73m, 95/73n, 120/111a and 161/163/141a. The symphony evolved from the overture, and "D major was by far the most common key for overtures in the second half of the eighteenth century." This continued even into the Romantic Period, and was used for the "triumphant" final movements of several D minor symphonies, including Beethoven's Ninth Symphony, Robert Schumann's Fourth Symphony, the only symphony by César Franck, Sergei Rachmaninoff's First Symphony, and Felix Mendelssohn's Fifth Symphony.

Famous symphonies written in D major include Mozart's symphonies No. 31 (Paris), No.35 (Haffner), and No. 38 (Prague), Beethoven's No. 2, Op. 36, Brahms's No. 2, Op. 73, Sibelius's No. 2, Op. 43, and Prokofiev's No. 1 (Classical), Op. 25.

== Notable compositions in D major ==
- Antonio Vivaldi
  - Gloria RV 589
- Johann Sebastian Bach
  - Brandenburg Concerto No. 5, BWV 1050
  - Cello Suite No. 6, BWV 1012
  - Orchestral Suite No. 3, BWV 1068
  - Orchestral Suite No. 4, BWV 1069
  - Magnificat, BWV 243
  - Partita No. 4, BWV 828
- Johann Pachelbel
  - Canon in D
- George Frideric Handel
  - Music for the Royal Fireworks, HWV 351
- Joseph Haydn
  - Cello Concerto No. 2, Op. 101, Hob. VIIb/2
  - String Quartet No. 41, Hob.III:49 ("The Frog")
  - String Quartet No. 53, Hob.III:63 ("The Lark")
  - String Quartet No. 64, Hob.III:79 ("Largo")
  - Symphony No. 86, Hob.I:86
  - Symphony No. 96, Hob.I:96 ("The Miracle")
  - Symphony No. 101, Hob.I:101 ("The Clock")
  - Symphony No. 104, Hob.I:104 ("London")
- Wolfgang Amadeus Mozart
  - Symphony No. 8, KV 48
  - Symphony No. 20, KV 133
  - Symphony No. 30, KV 202
  - Symphony No. 31, KV 297 ("Paris")
  - Symphony No. 35, KV 385 ("Haffner")
  - Symphony No. 38, KV 504 ("Prague")
  - Piano Concerto No. 5, KV 175
  - Piano Concerto No. 16, KV 451
  - Piano Concerto No. 26, KV 537 ("Coronation")
  - String Quartet No. 20, KV 499 ("Hoffmeister")
  - String Quartet No. 21, KV 575
  - String Quintet No. 5, KV 593
  - Piano Sonata No. 6, KV 284 ("Dürnitz")
  - Piano Sonata No. 9, KV 311
  - Piano Sonata No. 18, KV 576
  - Sonata in D major for Two Pianos, KV 448
  - Ave verum corpus, KV 618
- Ludwig van Beethoven
  - Kurfürsten Sonata No. 3 WoO 47/3
  - Sonata for piano four-hands, Op. 6
  - String Trio No. 2, Op. 8 (as well as the transcription for viola and piano, Op. 42)
  - String Trio No. 4, Op. 9/2
  - String Quartet No. 3, Op. 18, No. 3
  - Serenade for flute, violin and viola Op. 25 (as well as the transcription for flute and piano, Op. 41)
  - Violin Sonata No. 1 Op. 12/1
  - Piano Sonata No. 7, Op. 10/3
  - Piano Sonata No. 15, Op. 28 ("Pastoral")
  - Symphony No. 2, Op. 36
  - Violin Concerto, Op. 61
  - Piano Trio No. 5, Op. 70, No. 1 ("Ghost")
  - Variations on a Turkish March Op. 76
  - Cello Sonata No. 5, Op. 102/2
  - Missa Solemnis, Op. 123
- Franz Schubert
  - Symphony No. 1, D. 82
  - Symphony No. 3, D. 200
  - Symphony No. 10, D 936A
  - String Quartet No. 6, D. 74
  - String Quartet No. 7, D. 94
  - Piano Sonata No. 17, D 850 "Gasteiner"
- Felix Mendelssohn
  - Symphonies for string orchestra Nos. 2 and 8
  - Calm Sea and Prosperous Voyage, Op. 27
  - String Quartet No. 3, Op. 44, No. 1
  - Cello Sonata No. 2, Op. 58
  - Organ Sonata No. 5, Op. 65, No. 5
  - Piano Sextet for piano, violin, two violas, cello and double bass, Op. posth. 110
- Frédéric Chopin
  - Mazurka, Op. 33, No. 2
  - Prelude No. 5, Op. 28
- Johannes Brahms
  - Hungarian Dance No. 6, WoO 21
  - Serenade No. 1, Op. 11
  - Symphony No. 2, Op. 73
  - Violin Concerto, Op. 77
  - Ballade No. 2 for piano solo, Op. 10/2
  - Two sets of variations for piano solo, Op. 21
- Alexander Borodin
  - String Quartet No. 2
- Émile Waldteufel
  - Estudiantina waltz, Op. 191
- Pyotr Ilyich Tchaikovsky
  - String Quartet No. 1, Op. 11
  - Symphony No. 3, Op. 29 ("Polish")
  - Violin Concerto, Op. 35
- Antonín Dvořák
  - String Quartet No. 3, B. 18
  - Piano Quartet No. 1, B. 53, Op. 23
  - Symphony No. 6, B 112 Op. 60
  - Mass in D major, B 153/175, Op. 86
  - Czech Suite, B 39 Op. 39
  - Slavonic Dance No. 6, B 83 Op. 46
- Gustav Mahler
  - Symphony No. 1 "Titan"
  - Symphony No. 9 (ends in D-flat major)
- Jean Sibelius
  - Symphony No. 2, Op. 43
  - The Oceanides, Op. 73
- Ralph Vaughan Williams
  - Symphony No. 5 in D major
- Sergei Prokofiev
  - Violin Concerto No. 1, Op. 19
  - Symphony No. 1, Op. 25 ("Classical")
  - Flute Sonata Op. 94 (and the transcription as the Violin Sonata No. 2 Op. 94bis)
- Dmitri Shostakovich
  - String Quartet No. 4, Op. 83
  - Prelude No. 5, Op. 87, No. 5
- Heitor Villa-Lobos
  - Étude No. 3 for guitar

== See also ==
- Key (music)
- Major and minor

No.	Flats		Sharps	
No.	Major	minor	Major	minor
0	C	a	C	a
1	F	d	G	e
2	B♭	g	D	b
3	E♭	c	A	f♯
4	A♭	f	E	c♯
5	D♭	b♭	B	g♯
6	G♭	e♭	F♯	d♯
7	C♭	a♭	C♯	a♯
8	F♭	d♭	G♯	e♯
