= Neue Mozart-Ausgabe =

1956–2007 catalogue of Mozart compositions

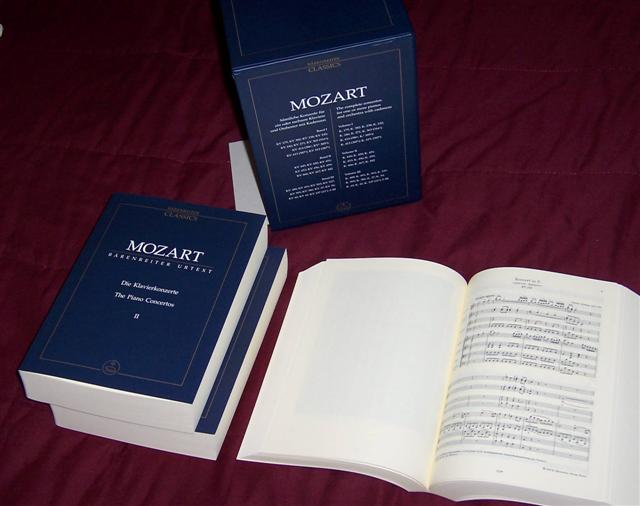
Bärenreiter reprint (2006) of the Neue Mozart-Ausgabe volumes containing all of Mozart's piano concertos. The nine full-sized clothbound volumes of the original edition have been reduced to three thick slipcased paperbacks.

The Neue Mozart-Ausgabe (NMA; English: New Mozart Edition) is the second complete works edition of the music of Wolfgang Amadeus Mozart. A longer and more formal title for the edition is Wolfgang Amadeus Mozart (1756–1791): Neue Ausgabe sämtlicher Werke [Wolfgang Amadeus Mozart (1756–1791): New Edition of the Complete Works].

== Publication ==
Published between 1956 and 2007 by Bärenreiter-Verlag, the NMA is a scholarly critical edition of all of Mozart's compositions. It consists of 132 volumes containing 25,000 pages of music, organised in 35 work groups, arranged in ten series. Each music volume is accompanied by a separate critical commentary, totalling 8,000 pages.

The ten series are:

1. Sacred Vocal Works (15 volumes)
2. Stage Works (26 volumes)
3. Lieder, Part Songs, Canons (3 volumes)
4. Orchestral Works (19 volumes)
5. Concertos (14 volumes)
6. Church Sonatas (1 volume)
7. Music for Large Ensembles of Solo Instruments (3 volumes)
8. Chamber Music (11 volumes)
9. Piano Music (7 volumes)
10. Supplement (ca. 25 volumes)

== Strengths ==
The Neue Mozart-Ausgabe is an advance over the previous complete works edition of Mozart published by Breitkopf & Härtel from 1877 to 1883 (with supplements until 1910), which is sometimes referred to today as the Alte Mozart-Ausgabe (or "Old Mozart Edition"). One of the editorial directors, Wolfgang Rehm, writes that "The NMA aims to be a historical-critical edition and to offer as such the latest state of philological-musicological procedure as well as practical knowledge (particularly with regard to performance) of Mozart's creative production."

Highly regarded and frequently used by performers of Mozart's music and musical scholars, the Neue Mozart-Ausgabe is an indispensable reference for anyone seriously interested in the output of this composer. H. C. Robbins Landon has called it "an absolute necessity if we are to perform Mozart correctly," and on one occasion had to insist that the Vienna Philharmonic use the NMA for a series of recordings of Mozart's symphonies rather than the less accurate Breitkopf & Härtel edition mentioned above.

=== Unavailable source materials ===
Stanley Sadie remarks that the work of the NMA was "hampered by the removal in World War II and the unavailability until 1980 of most of the largest single collection of Mozart autographs, that of the Berlin State Library, Berlin." Consequently, the editors of the NMA had to manage with this state of affairs as well as possible. In editing The Marriage of Figaro for the NMA, which appeared in 1973, Ludwig Finscher was only able to access the first two acts of the autograph score. In editing the Piano Concerto No. 27, K. 595, Wolfgang Rehm actually had to make use of a photographic reproduction of the autograph made before the war, which was provided by the pianist Rudolf Serkin, since the autograph itself was not accessible in 1960 when the NMA volume containing the concerto was published.

Along similar lines, Landon comments that "recently discovered manuscript sources have rendered even the NMA's edition of the Linz symphony obsolete." It is perhaps inevitable that new finds will in time render some aspects of the NMA open to reconsideration, since research and discovery regarding Mozart's work remain an ongoing process.

=== Criticisms of ornamentation ===
Some detailed criticism of the ornamentation suggested by the NMA can be found in Frederick Neumann's book Ornamentation and Improvisation in Mozart. Neumann finds some of the ornamentation, particularly regarding vocal cadenzas, helpful, while some of it is in his view misjudged. However, Neumann's strictures do not seem particularly severe, and in his "Preface" he writes that, although he attempted where possible to view primary sources of Mozart's music, where this was not possible, the NMA "offered an indispensable supplement".

== Availability ==
The Neue Mozart-Ausgabe has been most accessible in large hardbound volumes found in music libraries, though its publisher, Bärenreiter, has more recently been publishing portions of the NMA in a paperback format.

Starting 12 December 2006, scans of the vast majority of the Neue Mozart-Ausgabe are also available online as the DME (Digital Mozart Edition) in JPEG and PDF format, a service provided by the International Mozarteum Foundation in cooperation with the Packard Humanities Institute.

== See also ==
- Köchel catalogue, since 1863 ongoing effort to catalogue all of Mozart's works
- List of compositions by Wolfgang Amadeus Mozart
