= List of most expensive books and manuscripts =

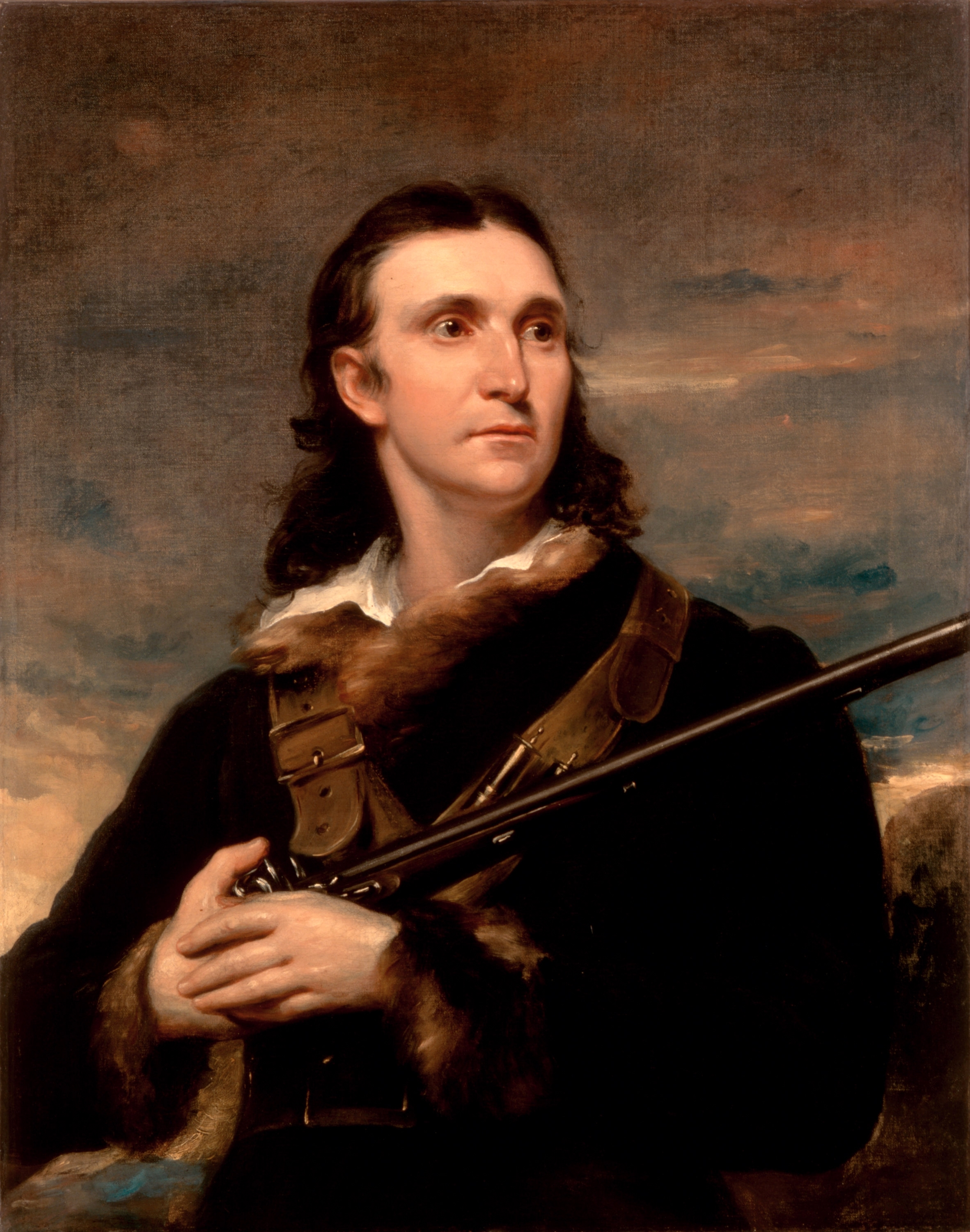
Eight copies of Audubon's The Birds of America have each sold for more than $1 million.

This is a list of printed books, manuscripts, letters, music scores, comic books, maps and other documents which have been sold for more than US$1 million. The dates of composition of the books range from the 7th-century Quran leaf palimpsest and the early 8th-century St Cuthbert Gospel, to a 21st-century autograph manuscript of J. K. Rowling's The Tales of Beedle the Bard. The earliest printed book in the list is a Southern Song annotated woodblock edition of the Book of Tang printed c. 1234. The first book to achieve a sale price of greater than $1 million was a copy of the Gutenberg Bible which sold for $2.4 million in 1978.

The most copies of a single book sold for a price over $1 million is John James Audubon's The Birds of America (1827–1838), which is represented by eight different copies in this list.

Other books featured multiple times on the list are the First Folio of Shakespeare's plays with five separate copies and five separate broadside printings of the United States Declaration of Independence, the Gutenberg Bible and The North American Indian with four separate copies each, three copies of De revolutionibus orbium coelestium, two printings each of the Emancipation Proclamation and the Thirteenth Amendment to the United States Constitution, two illustrated folios from the Shahnameh of Shah Tahmasp, two copies of the Philosophiæ Naturalis Principia Mathematica, Hortus Eystettensis, Geographia Cosmographia and William Caxton's English translation of Recuyell of the Historyes of Troye have also been repeatedly sold.

Abraham Lincoln and Isaac Newton are the most featured authors, with three separate works, while Albert Einstein, Martin Waldseemüller, George Washington, André Breton, Robert Schumann, and Charlotte Brontë have two separate works each.

== Table of book sales ==
| Price (US$ millions) | | Title and description | Author | Year | Purchaser | Date of sale | Image | Ref(s) |
| Inflation- adjusted | Original | Title and description | Author | Year | Purchaser | Date of sale | Image | Ref(s) |
|---|---|---|---|---|---|---|---|---|
| $51.3 | $43.2 | United States Constitution First printing. Previously owned by S. Howard Goldman. | Founding Fathers of the United States at the Constitutional Convention | 1787 | Kenneth C. Griffin | November 2021 | | |
| $48.1 | $38.2 | Letters from Zhao Mengfu to his friend Guo Tianxi Two letters, sold as a set from Yuan dynasty artist Zhao Mengfu to his friend | Zhao Mengfu | 1254–1322 | | November 2019 | | |
| $40.3 | $38.1 | Codex Sassoon 1053 A copy of the Hebrew Bible that is contemporary to the Aleppo Codex, and is almost complete and a century older than the Leningrad Codex | – | Late 9th century | Alfred H. Moses for ANU - Museum of the Jewish People | May 2023 | | |
| $46 | $35 | Book of Mormon Printer's manuscript. Copy of original manuscript produced by Oliver Cowdery. Originally owned by David Whitmer. | Joseph Smith | 1830 | The Church of Jesus Christ of Latter-day Saints | September 2017 | | |
| $42.6 | $31.7 (Note: 207 million Chinese yuan) | Letter from Zeng Gong to his friend (júshì tiè 局事帖) Believed to be the only surviving original work by the Song dynasty scholar; written on the back of a sheet of paper used for woodblock printing. Previously owned by Xiang Yuanbian (1525–1590). | Zeng Gong | c. 1080 | Wang Zhongjun | May 2016 | | |
| $66.9 | $30.80 | Codex Leicester Notebook comprising a collection of scientific writings by Leonardo da Vinci, in his own hand. Previously owned by Giuseppe Ghezzi, Thomas Coke, 1st Earl of Leicester and Armand Hammer. | Leonardo da Vinci | 1500s | Bill Gates | November 1994 | | |
| $33.1 | $21.32 | Magna Carta 1297 exemplification of the 1216 charter, held by the Brudenell family and later the Perot Foundation. | – | 1297 | David Rubenstein | December 2007 | | |
| $38.6 | $21.21 | Sherborne Missal Illuminated missal in use at Sherborne Abbey. Chiefly illuminated by John Siferwas. Previously owned by Ralph Percy, 12th Duke of Northumberland. | – | Early 15th century | The British Library | June 2001 | | |
| $21.9 | $17.06 | 石壁精舍音註唐書詳節; Shíbì jīngshè yīnzhù Tángshū xiángjiē "Book of Tang in detailed sections with glosses by 'Stone Wall Studio'". Woodblock printed edition. Copy previously owned by Cao Kun (1862–1938). | Ouyang Xiu (comp.); Chén Jiàn 陳鑒 (ed.) | 1230s | | June 2018 | | |
| $20.1 | $14.34 | St Cuthbert Gospel Pocket gospel book that was buried with Saint Cuthbert (d. 687), removed from his coffin in 1104 and kept at Durham Cathedral. Subsequently owned by Thomas Allen and the English Jesuit College. | – | c. 710–730 | The British Library | April 2012 | | |
| $19.6 | $14.20 | Bay Psalm Book First book printed in what is now the United States. Originally owned by the Old South Church. | – | 1640 | David Rubenstein | November 2013 | | |
| $18.5 | $13.60 | Rothschild Prayerbook An illuminated book of hours once in the collections of Anselm Salomon von Rothschild (1803–1874) and his descendants. | – | c. 1505–1510 | Kerry Stokes | January 2014 | | |
| $15.7 | $13.20 | Einstein-Besso manuscript 54-page manuscript written jointly by Albert Einstein and Michele Besso. One of only two surviving manuscripts documenting the genesis of general relativity. | Albert Einstein, Michele Besso | c. 1912–13 | | November 2021 | | |
| $17.4 | $12.15 (Note: This is the auction price of one page of the book.) | Illustrated folio from the Shahnameh of Shah Tahmasp From the illustrated manuscript of Ferdowsi's epic poem presented by Tahmasp to Selim II. Illustration attributed to Aqa Mirak. Previously owned by Edmond de Rothschild and Arthur A. Houghton Jr. | Ferdowsi | c. 1525–1535 | | April 2011 | | |
| $12.1 | $12.14 | Original typeset scroll of first draft of Jack Kerouac's On the Road. | Jack Kerouac | 1951 | Zach Bryan | March 2026 | Kerouac_On_the_Road_scroll_-_Flickr_-_emdot | |
| $37.8 | $11.70 | Gospels of Henry the Lion Illuminated gospel book commissioned by Henry the Lion (1129/1131–1195) for use in Brunswick Cathedral. | Order of Saint Benedict | 1175 | The German government with support from private donors; now held at the Herzog August Library | December 1983 | | |
| $17.1 | $11.57 | The Birds of America One of 119 complete copies known to exist. Copy originally owned by Henry Witham (1779–1844). | John James Audubon | 1827–1838 | London art dealer, Michael Tollemache | December 2010 | | |
| $17.5 | $10.00 | Waldseemüller map Only surviving copy of the first map to use the name "America" and showing that the Americas were separated from Asia by the Pacific Ocean. | Martin Waldseemüller | 1507 | The Library of Congress | June 2003 | | |
| $12.4 | $9.98 | Mr. William Shakespeares Comedies, Histories & Tragedies First Folio edition with autograph letter of authentication by Edmond Malone (1741–1812). Previously owned by Mills College. | William Shakespeare | 1623 | Stephan Loewentheil | October 2020 | | |
| $13.8 | $9.83 | Acts of Congress George Washington's personal copy of a printed edition of the Constitution and Bill of Rights, with annotations in his own hand. | – | 1789 | Mount Vernon Ladies' Association | June 2012 | | |
| $12.4 | $9.65 | The Birds of America One of 119 complete copies known to exist. Copy originally owned by the 4th Duke of Portland (1768–1854). | John James Audubon | 1827–1838 | an anonymous buyer | June 2018 | | |
| $12.7 | $9.32 | Babylonian Talmud One of 14 complete sets printed by Daniel Bomberg that are known to exist. Previously owned by Richard Bruerne, Westminster Abbey and the Valmadonna Trust Library. | – | 1519–1523 | Stephan Loewentheil | December 2015 | | |
| $11.4 | $9.19 | Yongle Encyclopedia (永樂大典; Yǒnglè Dàdiǎn) Two volumes (comprising chapters 2268–2269 and 7391–7392) of the manuscript copy of the Yongle Encyclopedia produced between 1562 and 1567 for the Jiajing Emperor. The original copy produced between 1403 and 1408 is now lost, and only about 400 of the 11,095 volumes of the 16th-century copy now survive. These two previously unrecorded volumes in private ownership in France were bought. | – | 1567 | a Chinese collector from Zhejiang called Jīn Liàng 金亮 | July 2020 | | |
| $9.1 | $9.12 | Superman #1 First issue of the first Superman comic book series. | Jerry Siegel and Joe Shuster | 1939 | | November 2025 | | |
| $13.4 | $9.06 | Histoire de ma vie Autograph manuscript, including pages that at the time had never been published. | Giacomo Casanova | 1789 | Bibliothèque nationale de France | February 2010 | | |
| $11.1 | $8.80 | "The Olympic Manifesto" Pierre de Coubertin's 14-page autograph manuscript for his 1892 speech outlining his vision for a modern revival of the ancient Olympic Games. | Pierre de Coubertin | 1892 | Alisher Usmanov for the Olympic Museum | December 2019 | | |
| $16.5 | $8.80 | The Birds of America One of 119 complete copies known to exist. Copy originally owned by George Lane Fox (1793–1848) and subsequently by John Crichton-Stuart, 4th Marquess of Bute | John James Audubon | 1827–1838 | | March 2000 | | |
| $10.9 | $8.76 | Quran Manuscript of the Quran written on coloured Chinese (Ming dynasty) paper speckled with gold flecks; produced under the Aq Qoyunlu Confederation (1378–1501) or the Timurid Empire (1370–1507). | – | 15th century | | June 2020 | | |
| $9.9 | $8.31 | Luzzatto High Holiday Mahzor Illuminated Ashkenazi Jewish prayer book previously owned by Samuel David Luzzatto and the Alliance Israélite Universelle | – | Late 13th or early 14th century | | October 2021 | | |
| $15.2 | $8.14 | United States Declaration of Independence Dunlap broadside #23. | Thomas Jefferson et al. | 1776 | a consortium of buyers including Norman Lear | June 2000 | | |
| $15 | $7.57 | The Canterbury Tales First edition printed by William Caxton in 1477. Copy originally owned by John Radcliffe, then purchased by 4th Earl Fitzwilliam (1748–1833) in 1776 for £6. | Geoffrey Chaucer | 1477 | Maggs Bros | July 1998 | | |
| $9.5 | $7.00 | The 120 Days of Sodom Original manuscript. Previously owned by Charles de Noailles. Purchased by Gérard Lhéritier for the Musée des Lettres et Manuscrits. Later declared a French national treasure and removed from auction after Lhéritier's arrest for fraud. | Marquis de Sade | 1785 | | April 2014 | | |
| $8.4 | $6.64 | The Birds of America One of 119 complete copies known to exist. Copy originally owned by the Yorkshire Philosophical Society until 1946, and in possession of the Deerfield Academy from 1973 to 1985. | John James Audubon | 1827–1838 | | December 2019 | | |
| $7 | $6.33 | Illustrated folio from the Shahnameh of Shah Tahmasp From the illustrated manuscript of Ferdowsi's epic poem presented by Tahmasp to Selim II. Illustration attributed to Aqa Mirak. Previously owned by Edmond de Rothschild and Arthur A. Houghton Jr. | Ferdowsi | c. 1525–1535 | | March 2022 | | |
| $8.7 | $6.20 | The Deeds of Sir Gillion de Trazegnies in the Middle East Illuminated chivalric romance on vellum originally owned by Louis de Gruuthuse and subsequently by Louis XII of France and William Cavendish | – | 1464 | | December 2012 | | |
| $11.2 | $6.17 | Mr. William Shakespeares Comedies, Histories & Tragedies Third issue of the First Folio edition. Copy from the Library of Abel E. Berland; originally owned by Allen Puleston, then by the Dryden baronets of Canons Ashby. | William Shakespeare | 1623 | Paul Allen | October 2001 | | |
| $8.4 | $6.06 | Letter from Francis Crick to his son Letter explaining "the secret of life" written more than a month before the public announcement of the discovery of DNA | Francis Crick | 1953 | | April 2013 | | |
| $6.2 | $6.00 | Action Comics #1 First appearance of Superman | Jerry Siegel and Joe Shuster | 1938 | | April 2024 | | |
| $14.3 | $5.80 | Northumberland Bestiary Previously owned by the Dukes of Northumberland. Purchased by an anonymous buyer; resold in June 2007 for an unknown amount to the J. Paul Getty Museum. | – | c. 1250–1260 | an anonymous buyer | November 1990 | | |
| $7.6 | $5.68 | Symphony No. 2 (Resurrection) Autograph manuscript by the composer. Given by Alma Mahler to Willem Mengelberg. Later owned by Gilbert Kaplan. | Gustav Mahler | 1894 | | November 2016 | | |
| $9.3 | $5.62 | The Birds of America One of 119 complete copies known to exist. Copy owned by the Providence Athenaeum. | John James Audubon | 1827–1838 | | December 2005 | | |
| $16.5 | $5.50 | Les Liliacées Copy owned by Empress Joséphine (1763–1814) | Pierre-Joseph Redouté | 1802 | | November 1985 | | |
| $15.3 | $5.39 | Gutenberg Bible Copy owned by Carrie Estelle Doheny (1875–1958), then donated to St. John's Seminary in California. Purchased by Japanese booksellers Maruzen; resold to Keio University in 1996 for an undisclosed sum. | – | 1450–1455 | Japanese booksellers Maruzen | October 1987 | | |
| $8.3 | $5.17 | Mr. William Shakespeares Comedies, Histories & Tragedies Third issue of the First Folio edition. Copy originally owned by William Bates (1625–1699), then acquired by Daniel Williams (c. 1643–1716) in 1699, and held at Dr Williams's Library in London from 1716 until the sale in 2006. | William Shakespeare | 1623 | London dealer, Simon Finch Rare Books | July 2006 | | |
| $6.1 | $4.86 | Quran Royal Mamluk Quran written for Sultan Qaitbay (1418–1496). Later owned by Hagop Kevorkian (1872–1962). | – | 1489 | | May 2019 | | |
| $9.1 | $4.59 | Burdett Psalter An illuminated psalter made for Jean de Villiers, who was 22nd Grand Master of the Knights Hospitaller from 1285 until 1293. | – | 13th century | an anonymous private collector | June 1998 | | |
| $7.1 | $4.47 | Traité des Arbres Fruitiers This copy painted between 1804 and 1809 | Henri-Louis Duhamel du Monceau | 1768 | | December 2006 | | |
| $8.6 | $4.45 | Cornaro Missal An illuminated missal owned by Cardinal Marco Cornaro (1482–1524) and subsequently by Nathaniel Meyer von Rothschild (1836–1905) | – | 1503 | | July 1999 | | |
| $5.3 | $4.42 | United States Declaration of Independence Official William J. Stone copy of the Declaration of Independence presented in 1824 to signer Charles Carroll of Carrollton | Thomas Jefferson et al. | 1824 | | July 2021 | | |
| $12.3 | $4.34 | Nine Symphonies Autograph manuscript by the composer of symphonies 22, 23, 24, 25, 26, 27, 28, 29 and 30. | Wolfgang Amadeus Mozart | 1770s | an anonymous buyer who gave it to the Pierpont Morgan Library on permanent loan | May 1987 | | |
| $6.4 | $4.34 | Rules of basketball Typewritten first draft of the rules by James Naismith. | James Naismith | 1892 | David Booth, and given to The University of Kansas on permanent loan | December 2010 | | |
| $4.4 | $4.32 | Songs of Innocence and of Experience One of six copies in private hands. Etched, printed, and hand colored by Blake. First owned by Charles Augustus Tulk who lent it to Samuel Taylor Coleridge. Subsequently owned by members of the Rothschild Family and Anthony Blunt. | William Blake | 1795 | Stephan Loewentheil | June 2024 | | |
| $7.6 | $4.17 | Hours of Albrecht of Brandenburg Book of Hours painted by Simon Bening for Albrecht of Brandenburg | – | 1522–23 | | June 2001 | | |
| $9.3 | $4.07 | The Birds of America One of 119 complete copies known to exist. Copy originally owned by the University of Edinburgh. | John James Audubon | 1827–1838 | | April 1992 | | |
| $6.2 | $3.97 | The Tales of Beedle the Bard One of seven copies handwritten and illustrated by J. K. Rowling. | J. K. Rowling | 2007 | Hazlitt, Gooden & Fox on behalf of Amazon | December 2007 | | |
| $6.3 | $3.96 | Geographia Cosmographia Copy originally owned by Hieronymus Münzer (1437/47–1508). | Claudius Ptolemy | 1477 | Bernard Shapero on behalf of a private collector | October 2006 | | |
| $4.1 | $3.92 | Letter from Christopher Columbus to Ferdinand and Isabella Printed edition of a letter from Columbus describing his visit to the Americas | Christopher Columbus | 1493 | | October 2023 | | |
| $5.2 | $3.86 | Torah Editio princeps of the Pentateuch in Hebrew, with paraphrases in Aramaic, printed in Bologna. | – | 1482 | an anonymous buyer | April 2014 | | |
| $5.6 | $3.78 | Emancipation Proclamation One of 27 surviving copies of the Leland-Boker "Authorized Edition" printed by Frederick Leypoldt to benefit the Great Central Fair for the Sanitary Commission. Copy owned by Robert F. Kennedy | Abraham Lincoln | 1863 | | December 2010 | | |
| $5.6 | $3.77 | Rochefoucauld Grail Three volume illuminated manuscript containing the Lancelot-Grail cycle. Originally owned by Guy VII de La Rochefoucauld. Subsequently owned by Thomas Phillipps and Joost Ritman. | – | c. 1315–1323 | | December 2010 | | |
| $5 | $3.72 | Philosophiæ Naturalis Principia Mathematica Association copy of the first edition | Isaac Newton | 1687 | | December 2016 | | |
| $4.3 | $3.63 | Book of Hours Illuminated Book of hours on vellum. Previously owned by Bertram Ashburnham, 4th Earl of Ashburnham, Henry Yates Thompson, Charles Fairfax Murray, and Alfred Chester Beatty. | Master of the Paris Bartholomeus Anglicus | 1440s | | April 2021 | | |
| $4.9 | $3.61 | Hebrew Bible Vellum manuscript produced in England, comprising the Pentateuch, Haftarah and the Five Megillot. Previously part of the Valmadonna Trust Library. | – | 1189 | The Green Collection and donated to the Museum of the Bible | December 2015 | | |
| $4.3 | $3.6 | Amazing Fantasy #15 First appearance of Spider-Man | Stan Lee, Jack Kirby and Steve Ditko | 1962 | | September 2021 | | |
| $4.8 | $3.53 | The Birds of America One of 119 complete copies known to exist. Copy originally owned by York Subscription Library and subsequently by the Indiana Historical Society. | John James Audubon | 1827–1838 | | April 2014 | | |
| $6.1 | $3.49 | Symphony No. 9 (Choral) Copyist's manuscript with annotations by the composer. | Ludwig van Beethoven | 1824 | an anonymous private collector | May 2003 | | |
| $5.1 | $3.40 | Letter from Abraham Lincoln responding to "Little People's Petition" Response from Lincoln to "Children's Petition to the President asking him to free all the little slave children in this country." | Abraham Lincoln | c. 1864 | | April 2008 | | |
| $4.5 | $3.33 | Prelude, Fugue and Allegro for lute or keyboard in E flat major (BWV 998) Autograph manuscript signed by Bach. Originally owned by Carl Philipp Emanuel Bach and subsequently by Breitkopf and Alfred Henry Huth | Johann Sebastian Bach | c. 1735–1740 | | July 2016 | | |
| $4.8 | $3.22 | Letter from George Washington to Bushrod Washington Letter from Washington to his nephew arguing in support of the adoption of the proposed U.S. Constitution | George Washington | 1787 | | December 2009 | | |
| $3.4 | $3.12 | Captain America Comics #1 First appearance of Captain America | Jack Kirby and Joe Simon | 1941 | | April 2022 | | |
| $4.2 | $3.11 | The Gospels of Queen Theutberga Illuminated gospel book, probably produced at the Benedictine abbey at Metz for a member of the Carolingian dynasty, perhaps Queen Theutberga. Previously owned by Guglielmo Libri and William Tite. | – | c. 825–850 | | July 2015 | | |
| $5.5 | $3.09 | Last Address as President Autograph manuscript of Lincoln's final speech. Previously owned by Joan Whitney Payson. | Abraham Lincoln | 1865 | | March 2002 | | |
| $3.3 | $3.03 | Dune Storyboard for an unproduced film based on the 1965 science fiction novel Dune by Frank Herbert | Alejandro Jodorowsky, Jean Giraud, et al. | c. 1975 | | January 2022 | | |
| $7.9 | $3.03 | Monypenny Breviary Illuminated breviary originally owned by William Monypenny. | – | c. 1490 | Pierre Beres | July 1989 | | |
| $4.4 | $2.97 | Surrealist Manifesto Autograph Manuscript owned by Simone Collinet. Purchased by Gérard Lhéritier for the Musée des Lettres et Manuscrits. Later declared a French national treasure and removed from auction after Lhéritier's arrest for fraud. | André Breton | 1924 | | May 2008 | | |
| $3.7 | $2.89 | "God" letter Letter written by Albert Einstein to his friend Eric Gutkind explaining his religious beliefs | Albert Einstein | 1954 | | December 2018 | | |
| $4 | $2.88 | The North American Indian, being a Series of Volumes Picturing and Describing the Indians of the United States and Alaska Limited edition copy on Japan vellum signed by Curtis | Edward S. Curtis | 1907–1930 | | April 2012 | | |
| $3.5 | $2.8 | Das Große Stammbuch An album amicorum (book of friendship) comprising paintings and drawing by many different artists, collected by Philipp Hainhofer between 1596 and 1633. | – | 1596–1633 | The Herzog August Library | August 2020 | | |
| $3.9 | $2.77 | Portolan Atlas | Battista Agnese | 1542–46 | | April 2012 | | |
| $3.7 | $2.75 | Mr. William Shakespeares Comedies, Histories & Tragedies Third issue of the First Folio edition. Copy originally owned by Robert Edwards, then by George Shuckburgh-Evelyn (1751–1804). | William Shakespeare | 1623 | a private collector in the US | May 2016 | | |
| $7.4 | $2.70 | Psalter and Hours of Elizabeth de Bohun Illuminated manuscript originally owned by Elizabeth de Bohun. Subsequently purchased for an unknown amount. | – | 14th century | The Green Collection and donated to the Museum of the Bible | 1988 | | |
| $3.7 | $2.57 | Imhof Prayerbook Illuminated by Simon Bening. Earliest dated work by Bening | – | 1511 | | July 2011 | | |
| $4.2 | $2.56 | Doria Atlas Composite atlas comprising a mixture of manuscript and printed maps dating from the late 16th and early 17th centuries; commissioned by Giovanni Andrea Doria (1539–1606). | – | 1570–1620 | Bernard Shapero | October 2005 | | |
| $3.4 | $2.55 | Hortus Eystettensis Deluxe coloured copy of the first edition. Originally owned by Giovanni Faber. | Basilius Besler | 1613 | | July 2016 | | |
| $3.5 | $2.52 | Philosophiæ Naturalis Principia Mathematica Presentation copy of the first edition given to James II by Newton | Isaac Newton | 1687 | | December 2013 | | |
| $4.8 | $2.50 | The First Book of Urizen One of eight surviving copies of the original hand-printed, colour-illustrated book. Copy owned by John Hay Whitney (1904–1982). | William Blake | 1794 | a private collector | April 1999 | | |
| $4.4 | $2.50 | On the Road Original scroll. | Jack Kerouac | 1951 | Jim Irsay | May 2001 | | |
| $3.7 | $2.48 | Quran leaf palimpsest One of the earliest quranic manuscripts known | – | Mid 7th century | | April 2008 | | |
| $2.5 | $2.47 | Jones Declaration of Independence The only 18th century manuscript of the Declaration of Independence ever to appear at auction. | Samuel Jones | c. 1788 | | January 2025 | | |
| $2.7 | $2.43 | Marvel Comics #1 | Martin Goodman | 1939 | | March 2022 | | |
| $6.9 | $2.42 | Biblia pauperum (The Gotha-Doheny Copy) | – | 1460–1470 | | October 1987 | | |
| $3.2 | $2.41 | Thirteenth Amendment to the United States Constitution Copy signed by Abraham Lincoln (1809–1865) and various members of Congress. One of 3 "Senate" copies of vellum. Previously owned by the Gilder Lehrman Institute of American History. | – | 1864 | | May 2016 | | |
| $11.8 | $2.40 | Gutenberg Bible Copy owned by the Pforzheimer Foundation. | – | 1450–1455 | The Harry Ransom Center, University of Texas at Austin | 1978 | | |
| $3.2 | $2.40 | De libris revolutionum eruditissimi viri...Doctoris Nicolai Copernici… Narratio prima First Edition of the first account of Copernicus's heliocentrism | Georg Joachim Rheticus | 1540 | | July 2016 | | |
| $3.4 | $2.40 | Machzor Florentine illuminated manuscript on vellum | – | 1490s | | May 2012 | | |
| $2.36 | $2.36 | Noam Elimelech | The Rebbe Reb Elimelech of Lizhensk | 1788 | | November 2026 | | |
| $3.5 | $2.36 | Mr. William Shakespeares Comedies, Histories & Tragedies (First Folio) Third issue of the First Folio edition. Copy owned by Lord Hesketh (1916–1955). | William Shakespeare | 1623 | | December 2010 | | |
| $3.6 | $2.34 | Quran Signed Yahya Bin Muhammad Inn 'Umar, Probably Mesopotamia. Previously owned by Archer Milton Huntington (1870–1955) and the Hispanic Society of America | – | 1203 | | October 2007 | | |
| $2.3 | $2.32 | Detective Comics #27 First appearance of Batman | Bob Kane and Bill Finger | 1939 | | February 2026 | | |
| $5 | $2.30 | Symphony No. 2 Autograph manuscript by the composer. | Robert Schumann | 1846–47 | Robin Lehman | December 1994 | | |
| $2.6 | $2.22 | Batman #1 First issue of the first Batman comic book series and the first appearance of Joker and Catwoman. | Bob Kane and Bill Finger | 1940 | | January 2021 | | |
| $3.3 | $2.21 | De revolutionibus orbium coelestium First edition printed in Nuremberg by Johann Petreius in 1543. Copy originally owned by Nicolas-Joseph Foucault (1643–1721) and subsequently by Myron Prinzmetal (1908–1987). | Nicolaus Copernicus | 1543 | | June 2008 | | |
| $4.3 | $2.20 | Archimedes Palimpsest Palimpsest manuscript of On the Equilibrium of Planes, On Floating Bodies, The Method of Mechanical Theorems, On Spiral Lines, On the Sphere and the Cylinder, On the Measurement of the Circle, and Stomachion. | Archimedes | late 10th century | | October 1998 | | |
| $10.9 | $2.20 | Gutenberg Bible Copy owned by the General Theological Seminary in New York. | – | 1450–1455 | Bernard H. Breslauer on behalf of the Württembergische Landesbibliothek in Stuttgart | April 1978 | | |
| $2.9 | $2.17 | Emancipation Proclamation One of 27 surviving copies of the Leland-Boker "Authorized Edition" printed by Frederick Leypoldt to benefit the Great Central Fair for the Sanitary Commission. Signed by Abraham Lincoln and William H. Seward | Abraham Lincoln | 1863 | | May 2016 | | |
| $2.6 | $2.13 | Almanac Book of Hours Illuminated book of hours on vellum. Originally made for Marie de Balsac | Master of the Monypenny Breviary | 1490s | | July 2020 | | |
| $3.1 | $2.10 | A New and Correct Map of the United States of North America Layd Down from the Latest Observations and Best Authorities Agreeable to the Peace of 1783 First map of the United States published in America. Previously owned by William L. Dayton and the New Jersey Historical Society. | Abel Buell | 1784 | | December 2010 | | |
| $3.8 | $2.10 | Letter from Szilard and Einstein to President Roosevelt Typed letter written by Leo Szilard and signed by Albert Einstein warning that Nazi Germany might develop nuclear weapons and suggesting the US should start its own nuclear program. | Leo Szilard | 1939 | | March 2002 | | |
| $2.3 | $2.10 | United States Declaration of Independence Broadside printed by John Rogers based on the Pennsylvania Evening Post | Thomas Jefferson et al. | 1776 | | May 2022 | | |
| $2.8 | $2.05 | "Like a Rolling Stone" Handwritten working lyrics by Bob Dylan | Bob Dylan | 1965 | | June 2014 | | |
| $2.7 | $2.02 | Symphony No. 2 Autograph manuscript by the composer | Sergei Rachmaninoff | 1908 | | May 2014 | | |
| $2.8 | $1.95 | Great Hours of Galeazzo Maria Sforza Book of hours originally owned by Galeazzo Maria Sforza, and subsequently by William Waldorf Astor | – | 1471–1476 | | July 2011 | | |
| $2.9 | $1.88 | Kufic Quran Almost complete manuscript on vellum, produced in North Africa or the Middle East. Previously owned by Archer Milton Huntington (1870–1955) and the Hispanic Society of America | – | Early 10th century | | October 2007 | | |
| $3 | $1.87 | Thirteenth Amendment to the United States Constitution Copy signed by Abraham Lincoln (1809–1865) and various members of Congress | – | 1864 | | March 2006 | | |
| $2.6 | $1.85 | Opera (Bucolica, Georgica, Aeneid, with argumenta) Second printed edition of the works of Virgil, published in Venice by Vindelinus de Spira in 1470 | Virgil | 1470 | | June 2013 | | |
| $2.5 | $1.85 | Missal Illuminated by the Master of the Prayerbook of Albrecht V | – | 1430–35 | | July 2014 | | |
| $2.5 | $1.85 | Recuyell of the Historyes of Troye Translated and printed by William Caxton (c. 1422 – c. 1491) in Bruges; the first printed book in English and the first book printed by Caxton. Previously owned by George Hibbert, John Wilks and Thomas Phillipps. | Raoul Lefèvre | 1464 | | July 2014 | | |
| $8.9 | $1.80 | Gutenberg Bible Copy originally owned by George Shuckburgh-Evelyn (1751–1804). | – | 1450–1455 | Gutenberg Museum in Mainz | March 1978 | | |
| $2.9 | $1.79 | Album of watercolours | Pierre Gourdelle | 1555 | | June 2006 | | |
| $2.5 | $1.76 | Liber Insularum Archipelagi Illuminated Atlas of the Greek Islands on vellum. Previously owned by Thomas Phillipps. | Cristoforo Buondelmonti | 1450 | | April 2012 | | |
| $2.3 | $1.73 | Double plate from King Ottokar's Sceptre | Hergé | 1939 | | October 2015 | | |
| $3.4 | $1.71 | The Birds of America One of 119 complete copies known to exist. Copy originally owned by the Young Men's Association of the City of Buffalo (later Buffalo & Erie County Public Library). | John James Audubon | 1827–1838 | | April 1997 | | |
| $2 | $1.70 | Revisions to Principia Mathematica Newton's autograph manuscript revisions to three sections of the first edition of the Philosophiae naturalis principia mathematica. Originally owned by David Gregory. | Isaac Newton | 1694 | | July 2021 | | |
| $3.4 | $1.69 | Wycliffe New Testament Vellum New Testament in later version, translated into Middle English by Wycliffe and John Purvey. Previously owned by Alexander Peckover and Apsley Cherry-Garrard. | John Wycliffe | 1st half of the 15th century | | December 2016 | | |
| $2.7 | $1.67 | Illustrated folio from the Shahnameh of Shah Tahmasp From the illustrated manuscript of Ferdowsi's epic poem presented by Tahmasp to Selim II. Illustration attributed to Aqa Mirak. Previously owned by Edmond de Rothschild and Arthur A. Houghton Jr. | Ferdowsi | c. 1530–1540 | | October 2006 | | |
| $2.5 | $1.67 | Le livre des propriétés des choses Translation into French by Jean Corbechon of De proprietatibus rerum. Originally made for Charles V of France. | Bartholomeus Anglicus | c. 1390 | | July 2010 | | |
| $3.3 | $1.65 | De humani corporis fabrica The only known completely coloured copy. Probably the presentation copy given to Charles V by Vesalius in 1543. | Andreas Vesalius | 1543 | | March 1998 | | |
| $2.3 | $1.60 | The Watsons Autograph manuscript of a draft for the unfinished novel. Originally owned by Cassandra Austen | Jane Austen | 1803 | | July 2011 | | |
| $2.3 | $1.59 | Apple computer contract Original Apple Partnership Agreement, signed by Steve Jobs, Steve Wozniak, and Ron Wayne | – | 1976 | | December 2011 | | |
| $2.2 | $1.56 | Description de l'Égypte First edition copy originally owned by Jean Joseph Antoine de Courvoisier (1775–1835) | Commission des sciences et arts d'Egypte | 1817–1830 | | May 2011 | | |
| $2.1 | $1.55 | Arabic-English Lexicon Fair copy. Commissioned by Algernon Percy, 4th Duke of Northumberland | Edward William Lane | 1842–1876 | | October 2014 | | |
| $2.9 | $1.55 | Circe Autograph manuscript of chapter of Ulysses with additions, revisions and reworkings by Joyce in the margins. Originally owned by John Quinn. | James Joyce | 1920 | The National Library of Ireland | December 2000 | | |
| $3 | $1.54 | Alice's Adventures in Wonderland First edition copy originally owned by Lewis Carroll (1832–1898) | Lewis Carroll | 1865 | | December 1998 | | |
| $5.9 | $1.50 | Jami' al-tawarikh 59 folios from the second volume of the "Arabic Manuscript". | Rashid-al-Din Hamadani | Early 14th century | Nasser Khalili for the Khalili Collection of Islamic Art | 1980 | | |
| $1.9 | $1.50 | United States Declaration of Independence Broadside printed by John Holt. One of only five surviving Holt broadsides. Originally owned by Colonel David Mulford | Thomas Jefferson et al. | 1776 | | January 2018 | | |
| $2 | $1.45 | The Federalist Papers: No. 4 Autograph draft manuscript. Originally owned by Jay's sons Peter and William. | John Jay | 1787 | | December 2015 | | |
| $2 | $1.44 | The North American Indian, being a Series of Volumes Picturing and Describing the Indians of the United States and Alaska | Edward S. Curtis | 1907–1930 | | October 2012 | | |
| $2 | $1.44 | Letter from George Washington to John Armstrong Sr. Letter from Washington explaining his private thoughts on the U.S. Constitution | George Washington | 1788 | | June 2013 | | |
| $2 | $1.43 | Murphy Autograph Manuscript. Originally owned by Brian Coffey. | Samuel Beckett | 1936 | | July 2013 | | |
| $3.5 | $1.43 | The Federalist Copy originally owned by George Washington (1732–1799) | Alexander Hamilton, John Jay and James Madison | 1788 | | January 1990 | | |
| $2.3 | $1.42 | The North American Indian, being a Series of Volumes Picturing and Describing the Indians of the United States and Alaska | Edward S. Curtis | 1907–1930 | | October 2005 | | |
| $2.6 | $1.41 | Hortus Eystettensis Deluxe coloured copy of the first edition | Basilius Besler | 1613 | | November 2001 | | |
| $2.1 | $1.41 | Epistolae First edition of the enlarged recension of the letters of Hieronymus (Saint Jerome), printed on vellum in Mainz by Peter Schöffer. Previously owned by Thomas Phillipps. | Jerome | 1470 | | July 2010 | | |
| $2.1 | $1.40 | Poisson Soluble Autograph manuscript owned by Simone Collinet | André Breton | 1924 | | May 2008 | | |
| $1.9 | $1.38 | Illustrated folio from the Shahnameh of Shah Ismail II From the illustrated manuscript of Ferdowsi's epic poem previously owned by Rudolf Martin. Illustration attributed to Burji. | Ferdowsi | c. 1577 | | April 2012 | | |
| $1.8 | $1.33 | Opticks Presentation copy of the first edition given by Newton to Edmond Halley. Inscribed "Luceo. Ex dono doctissimi Authoris" on title page by Halley. | Isaac Newton | 1704 | | December 2015 | | |
| $1.8 | $1.29 | The Complete Book of the Medical Art Earliest known copy of the work. Previously owned by Baha' al-Din al-'Amili | 'Ali ibn al-'Abbas al-Majusi | c. 980 | | October 2014 | | |
| $2 | $1.29 | Atlas of England and Wales First printed atlas of England and Wales and set of five maps and plates illustrating Drake's expedition to the West Indies, 1585-1586. London, 1588]-1589 | Christopher Saxton | 1579–90 | | March 2007 | | |
| $1.8 | $1.28 | De revolutionibus orbium coelestium First edition printed in Nuremberg by Johann Petreius in 1543 | Nicolaus Copernicus | 1543 | | November 2011 | | |
| $1.7 | $1.26 | Recuyell of the Historyes of Troye Translated and printed by William Caxton (c. 1422 – c. 1491) in Bruges; the first printed book in English and the first book printed by Caxton. Copy previously owned by 2nd Marquess of Rockingham and 4th Earl Fitzwilliam. | Raoul Lefèvre | 1464 | | July 1998 | | |
| $2 | $1.25 | Hours of the Cross Illuminated manuscript on vellum original owned by John, Duke of Berry and subsequently by Beatrice of Portugal and Henry Pomeroy, 2nd Viscount Harberton. | – | 1425–1435 | | December 2006 | | |
| $1.4 | $1.25 | A Book of Ryhmes Miniature manuscript, one of 17 'little' books written by Brontë when she was a child. Purchased by Friends of the National Libraries and subsequently donated to the Brontë Parsonage Museum. | Charlotte Brontë | 1829 | | April 2022 | | |
| $1.7 | $1.24 | Exposition Abrégée Du Système Du Monde Selon Les Principes De Monsieur Newton Handwritten manuscript of translation into French of Isaac Newton's Philosophiæ Naturalis Principia Mathematica | Émilie du Châtelet | 1745–49 | | October 2015 | | |
| $1.5 | $1.22 | Summa de arithmetica First edition of the first vernacular book on algebra and the first description of double-entry bookkeeping | Luca Pacioli | 1494 | | June 2019 | | |
| $1.6 | $1.21 | "American Pie" Handwritten working lyrics by Don McLean | Don McLean | 1971 | | April 2015 | | |
| $1.8 | $1.20 | "A Day in the Life" Handwritten lyrics by John Lennon | John Lennon | 1967 | | June 2010 | | |
| $1.5 | $1.18 | United States Declaration of Independence Broadside printed by E. Russell | Thomas Jefferson et al. | 1776 | | January 2018 | | |
| $1.9 | $1.17 | Diaries Six volumes of the author's diaries from 1805 to 1814. | Stendhal | 1805–1814 | preemptively purchased prior to auction by the French state; now held at the Musée Stendhal in Grenoble | June 2006 | | |
| $1.4 | $1.17 | Frankenstein; or, The Modern Prometheus First edition. One of only 500 copies of the original run. | Mary Shelley | 1818 | | September 2021 | | |
| $3.3 | $1.16 | "On the Theory of Relativity" Handwritten manuscript | Albert Einstein | 1912 | | December 1987 | | |
| $1.5 | $1.14 | An Inquiry into the Nature and Causes of the Wealth of Nations Author's own copy of the first edition | Adam Smith | 1776 | | December 2018 | | |
| $1.4 | $1.14 | Tuhfat al-Ahrar Timurid or early Safavid Persian manuscript on variously coloured gold-speckled paper | Jami | Early 16th century | | June 2020 | | |
| $1.6 | $1.11 | Scenes from Goethe's Faust Autograph manuscript by the composer | Robert Schumann | 1853 | | November 2011 | | |
| $1.5 | $1.10 | Un coup de dés jamais n'abolira le hasard Autograph Manuscript | Stéphane Mallarmé | 1897 | | October 2015 | | |
| $1.4 | $1.09 | Illuminated double-sided bifolium from Nahj al Faradis The Angel of Bounty and the arrival of the Second Heaven of Pearls | – | c. 1465 | | October 2019 | | |
| $1.5 | $1.08 | Geographia tavole moderne di geografia de la maggior parte del mondo di diverse autori raccolte et messe secondo l'ordine di Tolomeo con i disegni di molte citta et fortesse Italian assembled-to-order atlas | Antonio Lafreri | 1592 | | April 2012 | | |
| $1.8 | $1.07 | Naturalis Historia Printed in Rome on vellum | Pliny the Elder | 1470 | | October 2005 | | |
| $1.5 | $1.07 | De revolutionibus orbium coelestium First edition printed in Nuremberg by Johann Petreius in 1543 | Nicolaus Copernicus | 1543 | | November 2013 | | |
| $1.5 | $1.07 | Young Men's Magazine Miniature manuscript, one of six 'little' books written by Brontë. Purchased by Gérard Lhéritier for the Musée des Lettres et Manuscrits. Later purchased by the Brontë Parsonage Museum for $873,600 after Lhéritier's arrest for fraud | Charlotte Brontë | 1830 | | December 2011 | | |
| $1.4 | $1.05 | On the Origin of Species Third edition with autograph annotations for second German edition. Originally owned by Heinrich Georg Bronn. | Charles Darwin | 1861 | | December 2017 | | |
| $1.6 | $1.05 | The North American Indian, being a Series of Volumes Picturing and Describing the Indians of the United States and Alaska Portfolio and Volumes 1–16 | Edward S. Curtis | 1907–1930 | | October 2007 | | |
| $1.3 | $1.04 | Letter by John Hancock announcing the adoption of the Declaration of Independence Manuscript letter signed by Hancock as President of Congress | John Hancock | 1776 | | January 2020 | | |
| $1.3 | $1.03 | Opera First edition of the complete works of Plato in any language. Translated into Latin by Marsilio Ficino and printed by Lorenzo de Alopa. | Plato | 1485 | | April 2021 | | |
| $1.4 | $1.03 | Composition Notebook Autograph wartime manuscript of mathematical notes. Left in Turing's will to Robin Gandy. | Alan Turing | 1944 | | April 2015 | | |
| $1.5 | $1.02 | Geographia Cosmographia First Ulm edition | Claudius Ptolemy | 1482 | | June 2009 | | |
| $1.4 | $1.02 | Babe Ruth's contract with the Boston Red Sox Signed by Ruth, Ban Johnson and Harry Frazee | – | 1918 | | July 2014 | | |
| $1.3 | $1.02 | Illuminated double-sided bifolium from Nahj al Faradis The Two Hells reserved for Misers and Flatterers | – | c. 1465 | | October 2019 | | |
| $1.9 | $1.01 | À la recherche du temps perdu vol. 1: Du côté de chez Swann First galley proofs of "Du côté de chez Swann". Given to Robert Proust (1873–1935) by the author. | Marcel Proust | 1913 | | June 2000 | | |
| $1.6 | $1.00 | Waldseemüller gores Waldseemüller map printed in gores format to be made into globe | Martin Waldseemüller | 1507 | | June 2005 | | |

== Books and manuscripts by century ==
| Century | Number sold |
|---|---|
| pre 10th | 3 |
| 10th | 3 |
| 11th | 1 |
| 12th | 2 |
| 13th | 6 |
| 14th | 5 |
| 15th | 32 |
| 16th | 23 |
| 17th | 14 |
| 18th | 17 |
| 19th | 32 |
| 20th | 26 |
| 21st | 1 |

== See also ==
- List of most expensive artworks by living artists
- List of most expensive paintings
- List of most expensive sculptures
- List of most expensive philatelic items
- List of most expensive photographs
- List of most expensive CCG cards
- List of most expensive sports cards
