= Patrick Poivre d'Arvor =

French TV journalist and writer

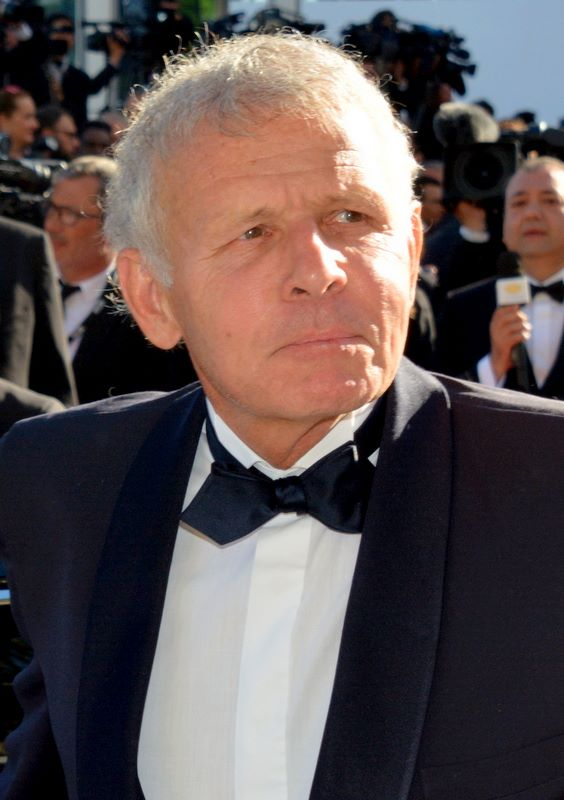
- Patrick Poivre d'Arvor at the Cannes Film Festival
- Born: Patrick Jean Marcel Poivre; 20 September 1947 (age 78); Reims, Marne, France
- Education: Institut national des langues et civilisations orientales: non-graduate. Sciences Po Strasbourg; Sciences Po Paris
- Occupations: Journalist, writer
- Notable credit(s): Le Journal de 20 Heures de TF1, on TF1, Vol de Nuit on TF1, La Traversée du miroir on France 5
- Spouse: Véronique Poivre

Patrick Poivre d'Arvor (PPDA; né Patrick Jean Marcel Poivre, French pronunciation: [patʁik ʒɑ̃ maʁsɛl pwavʁ daʁvɔʁ]; born 20 September 1947) is a French TV journalist and writer. He is a household name in France, and nicknamed "PPDA". With over 30 years and in excess of 4,500 editions of television news to his credit, he was one of the longest serving newsreaders in the world until he was fired in 2008. He presented his last newscast on TF1 on 10 July 2008. Since 2021, a total of 45 women have accused Patrick Poivre d'Arvor of sexual assault or rape that would have allegedly happened during decades prior. Twenty-five women filed a formal complaint. Among them, eight did so for alleged rape.

== Biography ==
Patrick Poivre was born in Reims, France. He obtained his Baccalauréat at 15, the year he became a father. He then studied Oriental Languages at the Institut national des langues et civilisations orientales and Law. Poivre claims to be descended in the male line from Jacques Poivre, brother of Pierre Poivre, an 18th-century nobleman in the time of Louis XV, "d'Arvor" being Jacques Poivre's pseudonym. Poivre, his siblings and his three surviving children legally changed their surname to Poivre d'Arvor in 1994.

=== Journalistic career ===
Poivre started training as a journalist at the Centre de formation des journalistes (CFJ) at 22. He obtained his first job in 1971 on France Inter as morning newsreader.

In 1974, at the time of Valéry Giscard d'Estaing's accession to the Presidency, Poivre joined Antenne 2. He made his first TV appearance there in 1975, and was presenter for news bulletins from 16 February 1976 to 28 July 1983. After a brief stint with Canal+, he joined TF1 in 1986 for the Sunday program A la folie pas du tout and Ex Libris, from Frederic Lepage.

On 31 August 1987, he became presenter for the weekday news of TF1 at 8 pm from Monday to Thursday. He is satirised in the French puppet show Les Guignols de l'info on Canal+, where his alter ego is the puppet PPD, the news presenter. In 2004, Poivre was cast in a minor voice-only role as a newscaster in the French version of the Pixar animated film The Incredibles (Les Indestructibles).

On 9 June 2008, it was announced that by Laurence Ferrari would replace Poivre d'Arvor as presenter of the 8 pm news. He made his last broadcast on 10 July. In an interview, he said that there was "no objective" reason for his dismissal, but declined to comment on "rumours" of political interference.

Since January 2009, Patrick Poivre d'Arvor presents La traversée du miroir on France 5. He also presented L'avis des autres on Arte.

In July 2009, he was approached by the I-Télé channel to presentThe18h-20h. But he declined the invitation.

In June 2010, he led a team in the French TV show Fort Boyard.

=== Professional controversies ===
His greatest controversy prior to his being accused of rape was the faked interview - actually footage of a press conference with added questions - he purported to have made with Cuban president Fidel Castro, broadcast on 16 December 1991. Télérama journalist Pierre Carles exposed this fraud, which Poivre blamed on his colleague and co-interviewer Régis Faucon, after the latter had departed TF1.

On 10 January 1996, the Court of Appeal sentenced Poivre to 15 months in prison (suspended) and fined him 200,000 Francs for his part in misappropriation of public funds in a case involving Pierre Botton and his father-in-law and then deputy mayor of Lyon, Michel Noir.

In December 2008, Nonce Paolini, former Chief Executive of TF1, filed for defamation against Poivre d'Arvor in the Correctional Tribunal of Paris: during an interview by Bretons in the preceding July, Poivre had accused the TF1 chief of having "installed a clocking-in system with access badges" and had formed "a private police force whose aim was scrutinising staff movements in the smallest detail".

Poivre participated to the promotion of financial placements in letters and manuscripts for french company Aristophil, which appeared to be a Ponzi scheme. In november 2015, Patrick Poivre d'Arvor, former sponsor of the Aristophil museum, recognized he was offered manuscripts and 400 000 € from Aristophil's head Gérard Lhéritier.

=== Personal life ===
He married Véronique Courcoux in 1971, with whom he had six children. They divorced in 2010. He has three surviving children from that marriage and one son from an affair with fellow news-anchor Claire Chazal. His and Véronique's son Arnaud, spoke about the divorce of his parents in 2010 in the Magazine Gala. One daughter, Solenn, committed suicide at a Paris metro station in 1995, aged 19, having been a long-term anorexic. Her plight became a symbol of the problems of anorexia and bulimia, with Poivre becoming a campaigner and writer on the issue. In December 2004, Bernadette Chirac, wife of former President Jacques Chirac, whose daughter also suffered from the disorder, opened a treatment centre in Paris for adolescents and named it "Maison de Solenn".

Poivre caused controversy by presenting his regular news bulletin the evening after Solenn's death.

For several years in the 1990s, rumours abounded that Poivre had had an affair with Claire Chazal, his weekend counterpart as TF1 8 pm news presenter. The pair refused to confirm the story until August 2005, when Poivre acknowledged in "Confessions", a book of interviews to journalist Serge Raffy, that he was the father of Claire Chazal's 10-year-old son, François. "We had set at [François' age] ten the time that this story would be revealed", Poivre said.

In February 2021, the prosecutors' office in Nanterre confirmed that Poivre was under investigation due to allegations of rape by a female writer, Florence Porcel, on several occasions between 2004 and 2009, as reported in her autobiographical book Pandorini. He was formally charged of rape in December 2023.

== Published works ==
He has published many books, two of which are dedicated to his daughter Solenn. He has also written prefaces to books by other authors, and these are not listed here.

- Les enfants de l'aube, 1982 J.-C. Lattès, ISBN 2-7096-0148-6 adapted as a TV movie starring Cyril Descours
- Les Femmes de ma vie, 1988 France Loisirs
- L'homme d'image, 1992 Flammarion, ISBN 2-08-066802-1
- Lettres à l'absente, 1993 Albin Michel
- Les loups et la bergerie, 1994 Albin Michel, ISBN 2-226-06987-9
- Elle n'était pas d'ici, 1995 Albin Michel, ISBN 2-226-07846-0
- Un Héros de passage, 1996 Albin Michel, ISBN 2-226-08563-7
- Une trahison amoureuse, 1997 Albin Michel, ISBN 2-226-09356-7
- Lettre ouverte aux violeurs de vie privée, 1997 Albin Michel, ISBN 2-226-09204-8
- La Fin du monde 1998 Albin Michel, ISBN 2-226-10009-1
- Petit Homme, 1999 Albin Michel, ISBN 2-226-10658-8
- L'Irrésolu, 2000 Albin Michel ISBN 2-226-11670-2, - Interallié Prize winner in 2001
- Les rats de garde (co-author Eric Zemmour) 2000 Stock, ISBN 2-234-05217-3
- Le Roman de Virginie, 2001 J'ai lu, ISBN 2-277-22080-9
- Un enfant, 2001 Albin Michel, ISBN 2-226-12608-2
- La Traversée du miroir, 2002 Balland, ISBN 2-7158-1416-X
- J'ai aimé une reine, 2003 Editions Fayard, ISBN 2-213-61562-4
- Courriers de nuit : La Légende de Mermoz et de Saint-Exupéry, (co-author Olivier Poivre d'Arvor), 2003 Place des Victoires, ISBN 2-84459-045-4
- La mort de Don Juan, 2004 Albin Michel, ISBN 2-226-15400-0
- Frères et soeur, 2004 Balland, ISBN 2-7158-1482-8
- Les plus beaux poèmes d'amour anthologie, 2004 Albin Michel, ISBN 2-226-07996-3
- Chasseurs de trésors et autres flibustiers (co-author Olivier Poivre d'Arvor), 2005 Place Des Victoires Eds, ISBN 2-84459-110-8
- Pirates et corsaires (co-author Olivier Poivre d'Arvor), 2005 Place Des Victoires Eds, ISBN 2-84459-075-6
- Coureurs des mers, (co-author Olivier Poivre d'Arvor), 2005 Place Des Victoires Eds, ISBN 2-84459-058-6
- Disparaître (co-author Olivier Poivre d'Arvor), 2006 Gallimard, ISBN 2-07-077966-1
- Rêveurs des Mers, (co-author Olivier Poivre d'Arvor), 2007 Place des Victoires Eds, ISBN 978-2-253-11545-8
- Age d'or du voyage en train 2006 Editions du Chene-Hachette-Livre. English translation 2007 "First Class-Legendary Train Journeys Around the World" The Vendome Press ISBN 9780865651883

== Filmography ==
- 1998 : Que la lumière soit, directed by Arthur Joffé
