= Audrey White =

English actress and model (1927–2014)

- Born: Margaret Audrey White; 2 November 1927; Bradford, England
- Died: 8 November 2014 (aged 87)
- Education: Henrietta Barnett School
- Occupations: Model; fashion journalist

Margaret Audrey White, Lady Wardington (2 November 1927 – 8 November 2014) was a red-headed English model who was refused a job as a BBC announcer in case her looks "alarmed timid men from Wigan and country districts." Later she had a career in fashion journalism before concentrating on charity work.

== Early life ==
Margaret Audrey White was born on 2 November 1927 in Bradford, the only child of a commercial traveller who left the family when she was young. She grew up in North London with her mother, Eva. They endured the Blitz during the Second World War together with their cat, named Luftwaffe. She took her school examinations at Henrietta Barnett School at the same time as German doodlebug attacks, the girls sheltering under their desks if it seemed a hit was imminent.

== Career ==
White's first job was as an assistant at an Elizabeth Arden salon in London's Bond Street. Phyllis Digby Morton, editor of Woman and Beauty asked White if she would be photographed for the magazine. From there, a career as a model developed.

White appeared as a bride in posters for British National Savings, had minor roles in several films and worked as an announcer on commercial radio. In 1951 she was rejected for the position of a stand-in BBC television announcer over fears that her appearance would overshadow the content, causing the press to exclaim that she was "Too beautiful for the BBC!".

In 1951 and 1952, White was the face of an advertising campaign for the washing powder Dreft and appeared endorsing the product across newspapers and magazines. Advertising in Picture Post described her as a "fashion model and T.V. girl" and quoted White as saying "I always find time to give my nylons and undies that all-important nightly dip in Dreft".

In September 1952 she appeared on BBC Radio's Light Programme in the series I Like My Job.

In 1954, White met Marcus Morris, managing editor of Housewife magazine, at a party and was offered the job of fashion editor on the magazine. After six years at Housewife she took the same role at Go magazine.

== Marriage and later life ==
In 1953, White married theatrical impresario, farmer, and former Brooklands racing driver Jack Dunfee but the marriage failed. In 1964, she married Christopher Henry Beaumont Pease, 2nd Lord Wardington, thus becoming Lady Wardington. The couple adopted three children. Lord Wardington was an enthusiastic book collector and together they attended many bibliographic events. Lady Wardington devoted herself to charitable causes from Meals on Wheels to local campaigns. She set up a course to teach women money management and wrote the Superhints books for charity from suggestions she canvassed from her many, often upper-class, friends.

== Wardington Manor ==
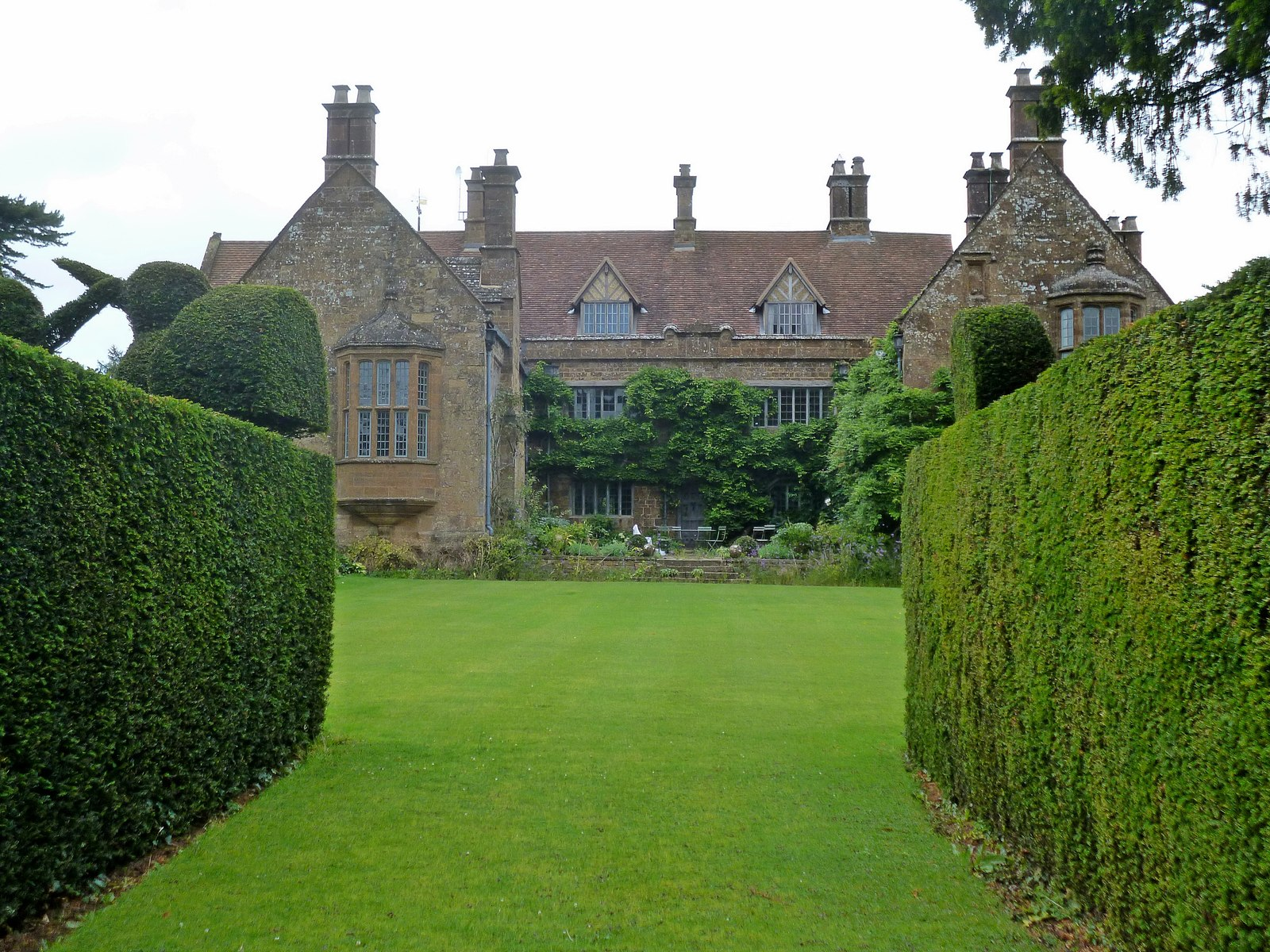
Wardington Manor, 2015

In 2004, the Wardingtons' home at Wardington Manor near Banbury was seriously damaged following a suspected electrical fire. Lord Wardington's book collection, however, including his unique collection of atlases, was saved through the efforts of their daughter Helen and local people. Lord Wardington died in 2005.

One of them, the Doria Atlas, was sold to Bernard Shapero in October 2005 for £1.46 million, a new record price for an atlas.

== Filmography ==
- A Piece of Cake (1948).
- It Started in Paradise (1952)
- The Final Test (1953)
- Rheingold Theatre, "Four Farewells in Venice" (TV; 1954)
