= Roger of Helmarshausen =

12th-century German goldsmith

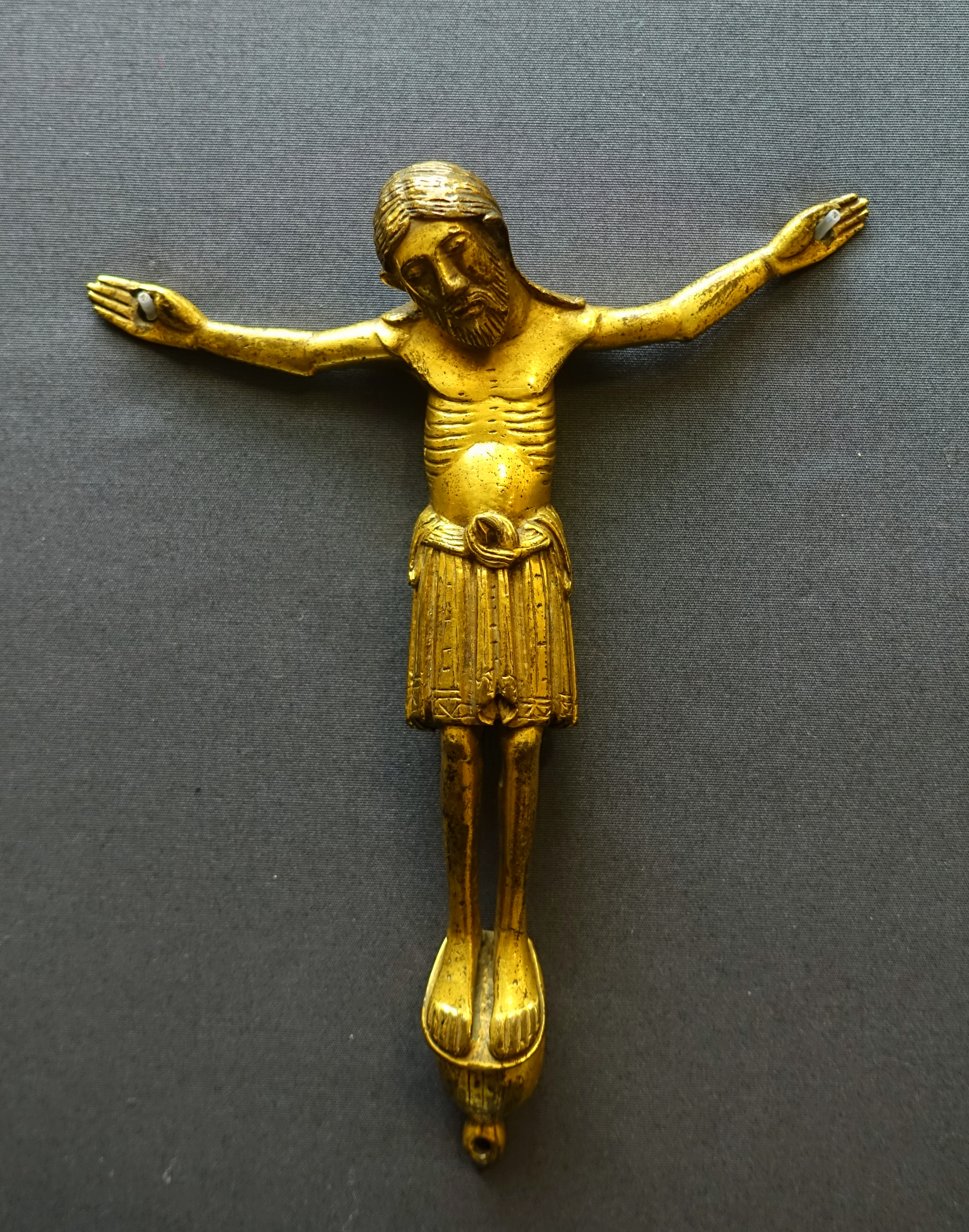
Christ crucified from a Processional Cross, by the circle of Roger of Helmarshausen, Lower Saxony, c. 1100, cast bronze

Roger of Helmarshausen (fl. 12th century) was a well-known goldsmith and metalwork artist, and also a Benedictine monk.

== Artistic career ==
Roger was born around 1070 in the Meuse region. He is first heard of in connection with Stavelot Abbey in the Meuse valley, a centre of Mosan art, and especially goldsmith's work. Having completed his apprenticeship he worked between 1100 and 1107 at the Monastery of St. Pantaleon in Cologne. At least two portable altars made by him are in the treasury of Paderborn Cathedral.

In 1107 the relics of Saint Modoald were translated from Trier to Helmarshausen Abbey, and the escort stopped at St. Pantaleon's on the way. Shortly after this, Roger moved to Helmarshausen Abbey, where he established a goldsmith's workshop. In conjunction with the well-known scriptorium, where the Gospels of Henry the Lion were produced later in the 12th century, he created several important works in the Romanesque style, including various illuminated codices, as well as many pieces of jewellery.

== De diversis artibus ==
Roger has been proposed by a number of academics (for example, Albert Ilg (1874) and C. R. Dodwell (1961)) as the real author of the important medieval treatise De diversis artibus (also Schedula diversarum artium), which is ascribed to the pseudonymous Theophilus Presbyter. This suggestion is not universally accepted, but has been supported by other academics, including Cyril Stanley Smith (1963 and 1974), Lynn White Jr. (1964) and Eckhard Freise (1981).
