= Lucy Hamilton Hooper =

American poet (1835–1893)

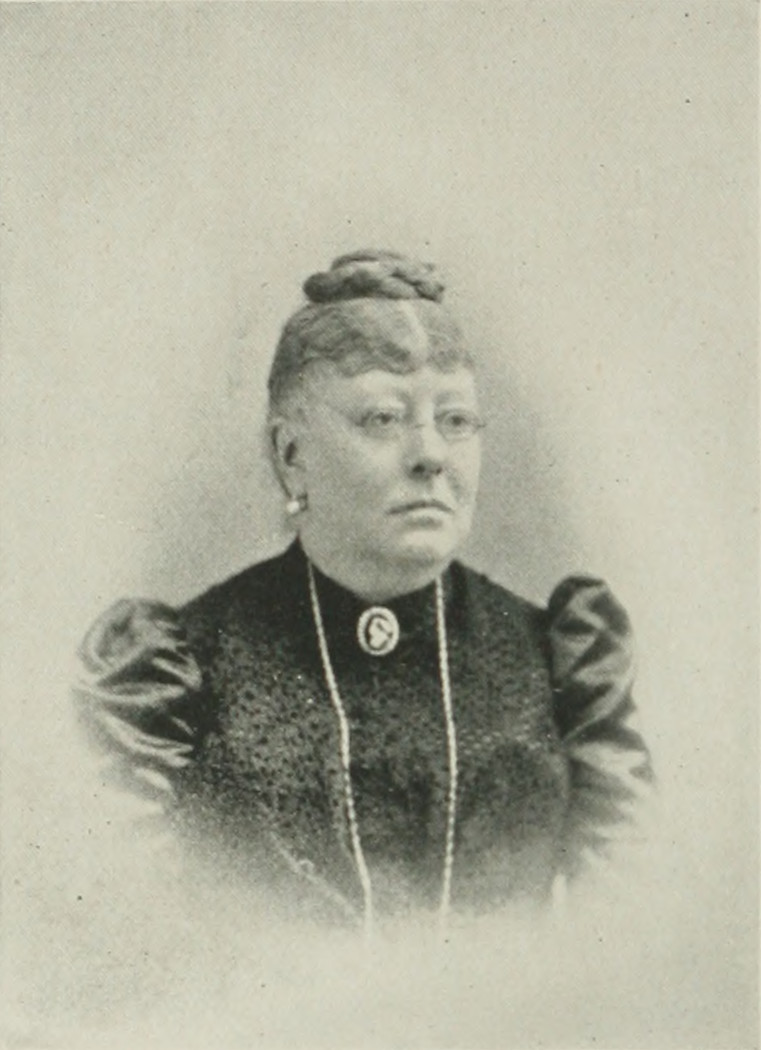
- Photo in A Woman of the Century
- Born: Lucy Hamilton Jones; January 20, 1835; Philadelphia, Pennsylvania, U.S.
- Died: August 31, 1893 (aged 58); Paris, France
- Resting place: Laurel Hill Cemetery, Philadelphia, Pennsylvania, U.S.
- Occupations: poet, journalist, editor, playwright
- Spouse: Robert E. Hooper (m. 1854)
- Writing career
- Language: English

Lucy Hamilton Hooper (née, Jones; January 20, 1835 – August 31, 1893) was an American poet, journalist, editor, playwright, and translator. Soon after her marriage in 1854, a commercial crisis ruined her husband's business and she was compelled to start writing professionally. She contributed regularly to newspapers and magazines, and was associate editor of Our Daily Fare, issued in connection with the fair held by the U.S. Sanitary Commission in Philadelphia in 1864, and to which she presented the first hundred copies of a small collection of her poems published in that year. She was associate editor of Lippincott's Monthly Magazine from its establishment in 1868 until 1870, when she made her first trip to Europe. She was the author of several works, including two plays.

== Early life and education ==
Lucy Hamilton Jones was born in Philadelphia, Pennsylvania, January 20, 1835. She was the daughter of Bataile Muse Jones, a well-known merchant of that city.

While attending school, Hooper contributed verses to Godey's Lady's Book.

== Career ==
In 1854, she married Robert E. Hooper, a native of Philadelphia, and resided in that city for several years. Her first poems, written, at a very early age, were published in Godey's Lady's Book. In 1864, a small collection of her poems was published by Frederick Leypoldt, the first 100 copies of the edition being presented by the author to the Great Central Fair for the benefit of the United States Sanitary Commission, which was then in progress in Philadelphia. The publication of Lippincott's Monthly Magazine began in 1868, and Hooper became a constant contributor. She assumed the functions of assistant editor of that periodical, a post which she retained till her visit to Europe, in 1870. In 1871, a second collection of her poems was published, including most of those that had been printed in the first volume, with important additions.

Hooper contributed a large number of stories, articles and poems to the leading American periodicals for more than 20 years. Though born to great wealth, Hooper was compelled to become a writer as a profession because of a commercial crisis. Her husband was appointed vice-consul general in Paris in 1874, and she became Paris correspondent for the Philadelphia Evening Telegraph, the Baltimore Gazette, the American issue of the Art Journal, Appleton's Journal, Lippineott's Magazine, the St. Louis Post-Dispatch, and the Paris American Register. She was a regular contributor to the Philadelphia Evening Telegraphfor 16 years, and of the St. Louis Post-Dispatch.

Hooper was the author of Poems with Translations from the German of Geibel and Others (1864); Poems (1871); The Nabob, translated from the French of Alphonse Daudet by special agreement with Daudet (1878); Under the Tricolor; or the American Colony in Paris, novel (1880); The Tsar's Window, novel (1881). She also wrote two plays: Helen's inheritance, which was produced at the Theatre d'Application, Paris, in 1888, at the Madison Square Theatre, New York, in 1889, and toured the United States for several seasons under the title Inherited; and Her Living Image, in collaboration with a French dramatist.

She was known for her translations of German poetry and published several works translated from Johann Wolfgang von Goethe, Emanuel Geibel, Friedrich Schiller and Christian Friedrich Hebbel. The four-act drama, Helen's Inheritance, was first produced in June 1888, in a French version, in the Théâtre d'Application, in Paris, Nettie Hooper playing the part of the heroine, continuing in the role when the piece was brought out by A. M. Palmer in the Madison Square Theatre, in New York City, in December, 1889. The drama was produced under another title, Inherited, throughout the U.S. for several seasons.

== Personal life ==
Hooper made her home in Paris, France, where she died August 31, 1893. She was buried at Laurel Hill Cemetery, Philadelphia.

== Selected works ==
- Poems: With Translations from the German of Geibel and Others., Frederick Leypoldt, Philadelphia, 1864
- Poems, J.B. Lippincott & Co., 1871
- Under the Tricolor: Or, The American Colony in Paris. A Novel., J.B. Lippincott & Co., Philadelphia, 1880
- The Tsar's Window, Roberts Brothers, Boston, 1881
- Those Pretty St. George Girls. A Society Novel., T.B. Peterson & Brothers, Philadelphia, 1883
