= Helmarshausen Abbey =

Benedictine monastery in Germany

Coordinates: 51°37′52″N 9°27′34″E

- Interactive map of Helmarshausen Abbey

Monastery information
- Order: Benedictine

Site
- Location: Helmarshausen

Helmarshausen Abbey (German: Kloster Helmarshausen) was a Benedictine monastery situated in the small town of Helmarshausen, now part of Bad Karlshafen in Hesse, Germany.

== History ==
The abbey was founded here near the River Diemel in 997 by the nobles Eckehard and Mathilde. It received great privileges from Emperor Otto III and was an Imperial abbey (reichsunmittelbar). It flourished particularly in the 12th century, but its geographical position exposed it to the repeated efforts of the Bishoprics of Paderborn, Cologne and Mainz to extend their territories and spheres of influence. The monastery was dissolved during the Reformation.

== Scriptorium and goldsmith's workshop ==
The abbey is of particular significance as the home of an especially skilled scriptorium and goldsmith's workshop, producing illuminated books and manuscripts, liturgical and ornamental pieces in gold for church use, and jewellery. This was set up by Roger of Helmarshausen, a highly skilled goldsmith and artist-monk, who moved to Helmarshausen from Stavelot Abbey in 1107. He is sometimes considered to be the author of the medieval treatise on art and crafts, De Diversis Artibus.

The scriptorium at Helmarshausen Abbey also produced the Gospels of Henry the Lion, an illuminated manuscript of the four gospels (or gospel book) written between about 1176 and 1188 by the monk Herimann (mentioned by name in the dedication), commissioned by Duke Henry the Lion for Brunswick Cathedral. The volume was sold at auction on 6 December 1983 at Sotheby's in London for £8,140,000, which made it the most expensive book in the world until the sale of the Codex Hammer in 1994.

== Burials ==
- Thietmar, Margrave of the Saxon Ostmark

== Present day ==
Only a few buildings remain of the former abbey, which are now used by the present parish for various purposes, including as a leisure centre and a kindergarten. A facsimile of the Gospels of Henry the Lion is displayed in the local museum.

== Sources ==
- (in German) Helmarshausen Civic Society website
