= Shapero Rare Books =

Bookshop in London, England

Exterior of the shop

Shapero Rare Books is an antiquarian & rare bookshop and art gallery located at 94 New Bond Street in Mayfair, London. Established in 1979 by Bernard Shapero, the bookshop specializes in rare and antiquarian books, with particular expertise in travel and exploration literature, natural history, fine illustrated books, and works on paper.

== History ==
The bookshop was founded in 1979 by Bernard Shapero, who began dealing in rare books at Gray's Antiques Market in London. Ten years later, the business moved to a purpose-designed gallery in Holland Park, before returning to Mayfair in 1996. In 2024, the bookshop relocated to its current landmark premises at 94 New Bond Street.

Under Shapero's leadership, the bookshop has grown to become one of London's most prominent antiquarian bookshops. In 2005, Slate magazine described Bernard Shapero as "London's most successful rare-book dealer and arguably the top dealer in the world today."

In April 2025, Bernard Shapero was elected President of the Antiquarian Booksellers' Association (ABA) for a two-year term.

== Specializations ==
Shapero Rare Books specializes in rare and antiquarian books. The bookshop's areas of particular expertise include:

- Travel and exploration literature (15th–20th centuries)
- Natural history and scientific works
- Fine illustrated books and colour plate books
- Children's books and modern first editions
- Hebraica and Judaica
- Islamica and works of Russian interest
- Baedeker guides and historical guidebooks

== Shapero Modern ==
In 2014, the company established Shapero Modern, a gallery division focusing on modern and contemporary prints, multiples, and works on paper. Under the direction of Gallery Director Tabitha Philpott-Kent, Shapero Modern specializes in Post-War and Contemporary art, with particular emphasis on American 20th-century artists.

The gallery maintains an exhibition programme of six shows annually, featuring both primary and secondary market works. Shapero Modern exhibits at major international art fairs including TEFAF Maastricht, TEFAF New York, Frieze Masters, Masterpiece London, Art Miami, the IFPDA Fine Art Print Fair, and the London Original Print Fair at the Royal Academy.

== Location and memberships ==
The bookshop operates from its premises at 94 New Bond Street in Mayfair, making it the only antiquarian bookshop on Bond Street.

Shapero Rare Books is a member of several professional organizations, including the Antiquarian Booksellers' Association (ABA) and the International League of Antiquarian Booksellers (ILAB).

== Staff and expertise ==
The bookshop's specialists collectively possess over 250 years of combined experience in the antiquarian book trade. The team includes experts in various specialized fields of collecting, enabling the bookshop to serve both institutional and private collectors internationally.
