= Doria Atlas =

1570 atlas commissioned by Giovanni Andrea Doria

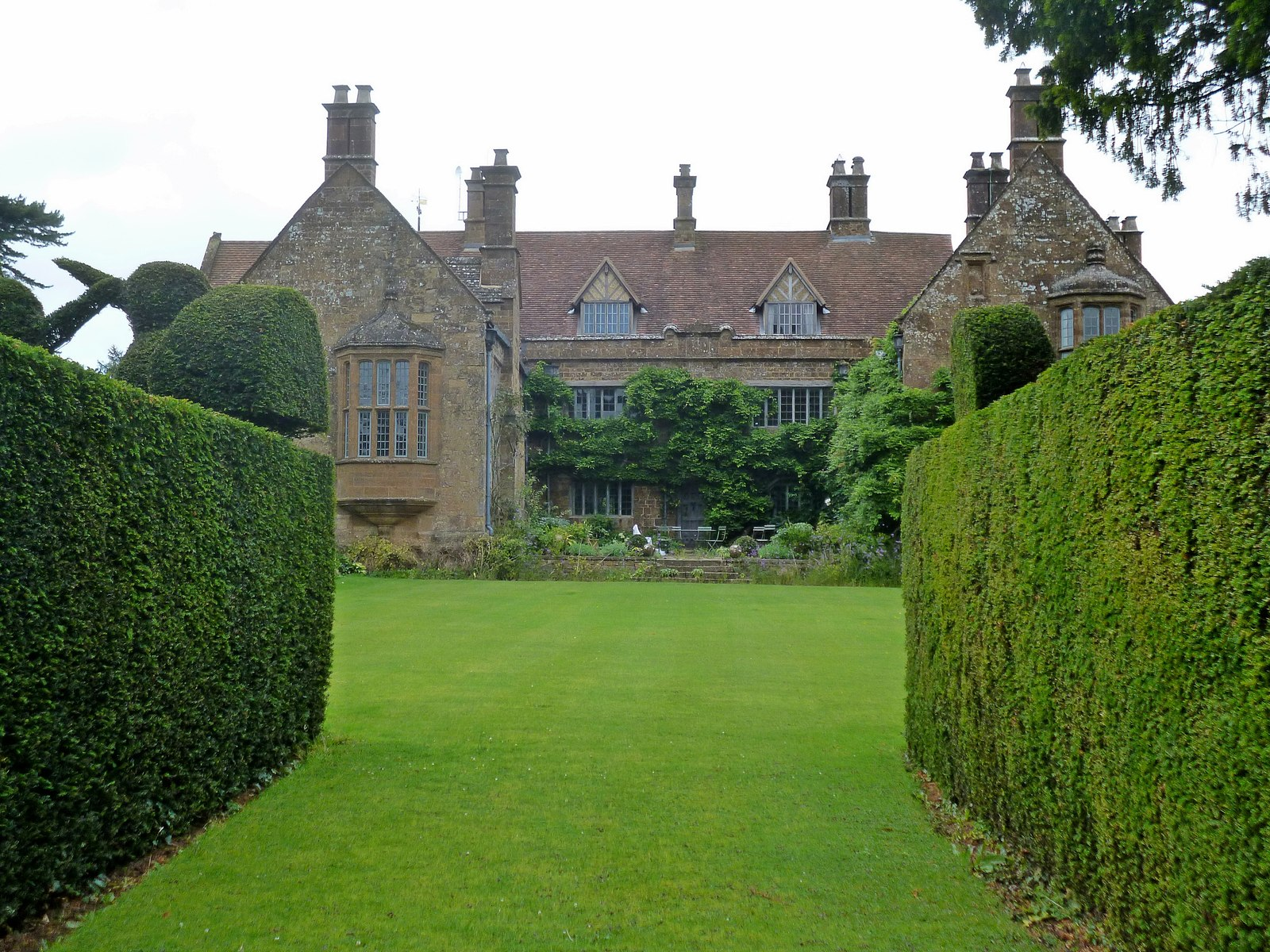
Wardington Manor, 2015

The Doria Atlas is a 16th-century atlas commissioned by and named after the Genoese military leader Giovanni Andrea Doria (1539–1606). Likely compiled around 1570, it is a composite atlas featuring 186 printed and manuscript maps from two distinct atlases of the Lafreri School. It also contains rare Italian maps dating back to the 1620s, in addition to a series of manuscript maps produced by little-known publishers during the 1620s and 1630s and detailing the commercial, political and military interests of the Doria family. By the 21st century, it was one of the world's most expensive books.

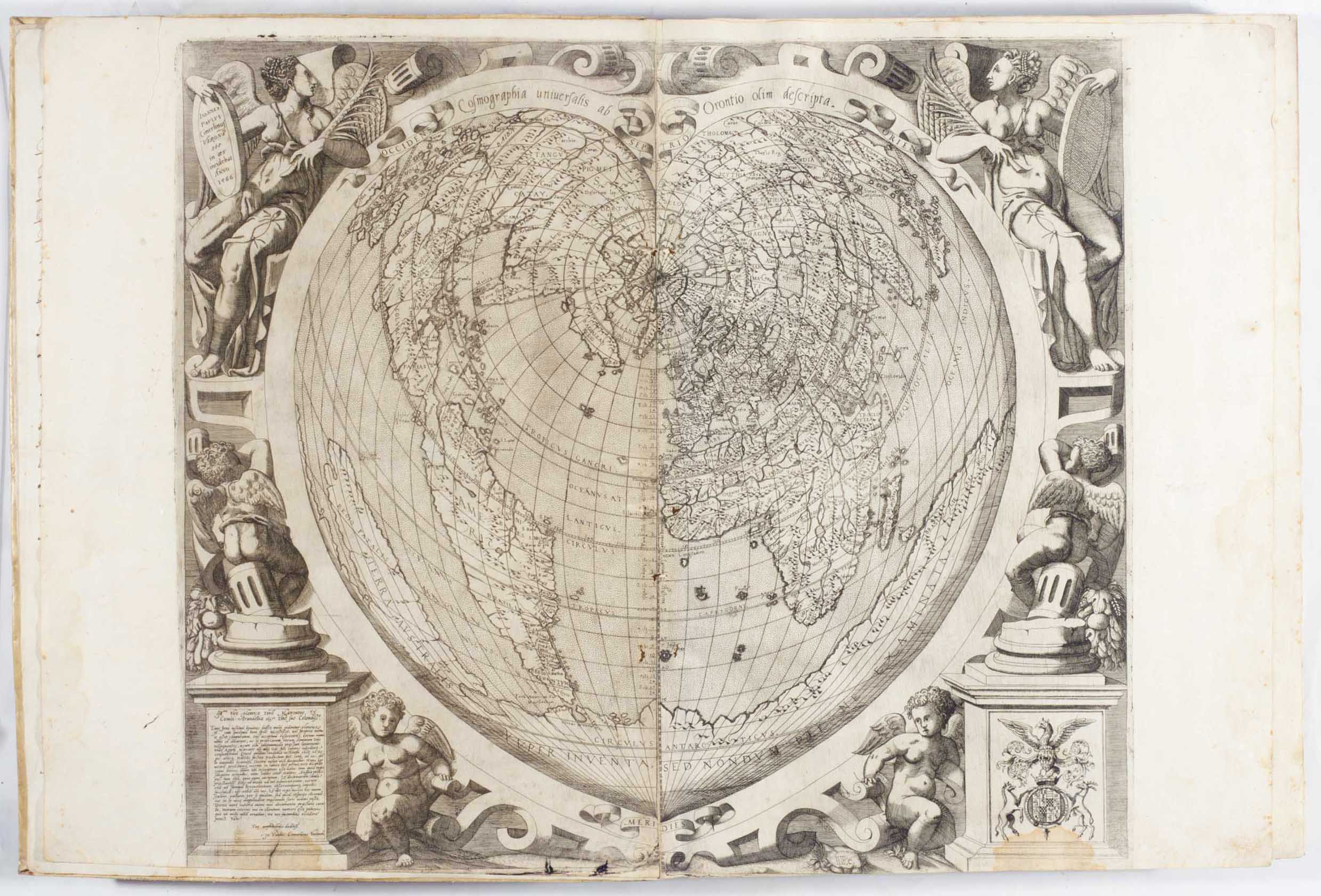
Printed map in the Doria Atlas

Having passed through successive generations of the Doria family, and later the British Rail Pension Fund, it was bought at auction by rare book collector Christopher Pease, 2nd Baron Wardington, for £240,000 in September 1988. In April 2004, the Doria Atlas was saved from a fire at Wardington Manor in Oxfordshire, when approximately 50 local residents "formed a human chain" to remove items from the Wardington library while firefighters were still attempting to put out the fire. Though most of the rare atlases contained in the library were saved with little or no damage, extensive damage to the property forced Lord Wardington to auction much of the collection.

Repair costs, in addition to Wardington's advanced age and frailty, forced a sale of 700 items from the collection. The Doria Atlas was sold at auction by Sotheby's in October 2005. Initially expected to fetch £700,000 to £1 million, it ultimately was purchased by Bernard Shapero, a London rare book dealer, for £1.46 million. Its sale price was the highest ever for an atlas, a record surpassed by the Geographia the following year.

== See also ==
- List of most expensive books and manuscripts
