= Theophilus Presbyter =

German monk and writer (c. 1070–1125)

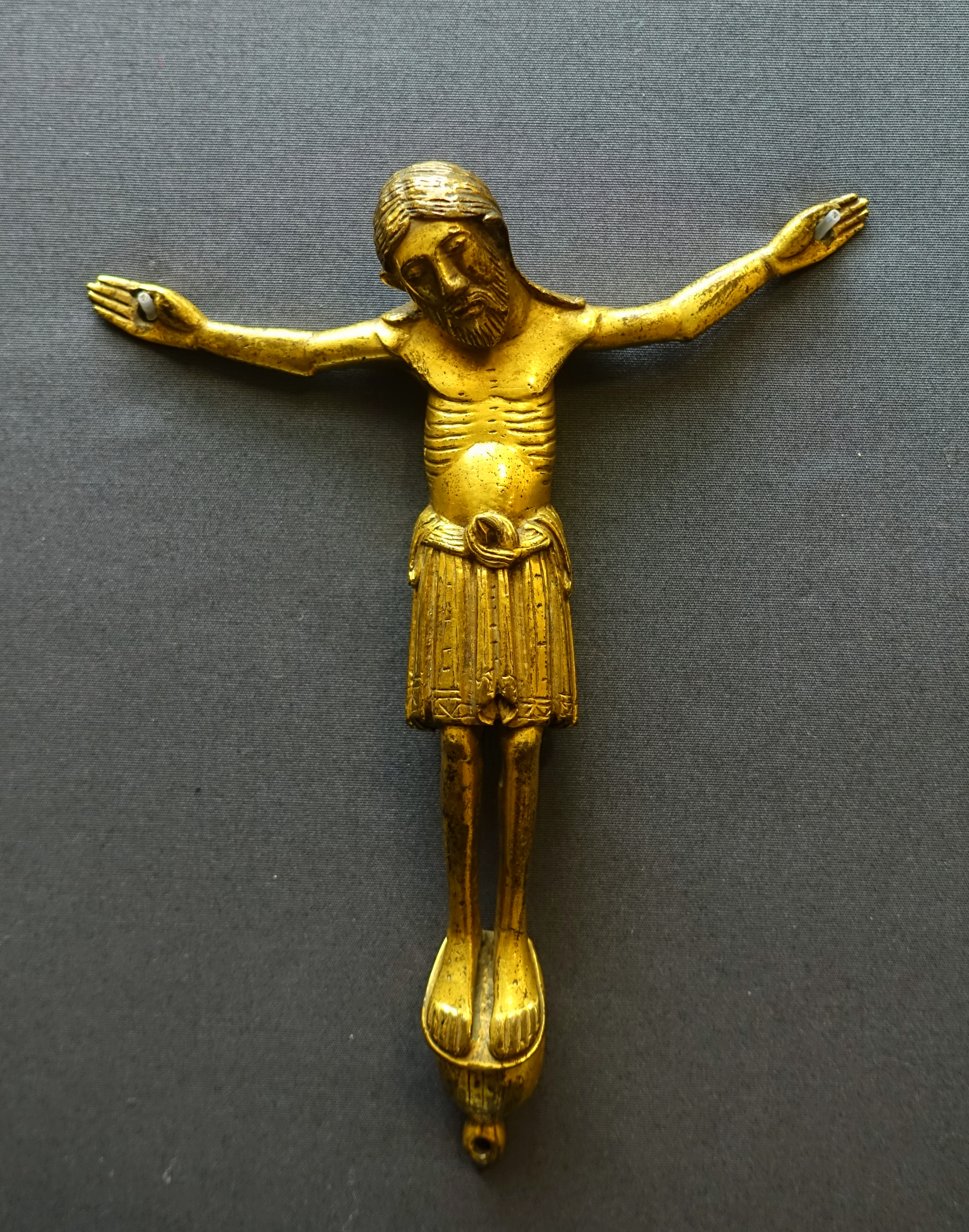
Christ crucified from a Processional Cross, by the circle of Roger of Helmarshausen, Lower Saxony, c. 1100, cast bronze

Theophilus Presbyter (fl. c. 1070–1125) is the pseudonymous author or compiler of a Latin text containing detailed descriptions of various medieval arts, a text commonly known as the Schedula diversarum artium ("List of various arts") or De diversis artibus ("On various arts"), probably first compiled between 1100 and 1120.

== Work ==
The oldest manuscript copies of De diversis artibus are found in Vienna (Austrian National Library, Codex 2527) and in Wolfenbüttel (Herzog-August-Bibliothek, Cod. Guelf. Gud. Lat. 69 2°). Gotthold Ephraim Lessing rediscovered the document when he worked as librarian in Wolfenbüttel, and published excerpts in 1774. The work contains perhaps the earliest reference to oil paint, which aroused great interest as the mention disproved Vasari's myth of Jan van Eyck developing the technique of oil painting in the early 15th century, about which antiquaries had already become suspicious. It also contains what seems to be the earliest textual evidence for wire-making using a draw plate.

Theophilus' Schedula allows detailed insights into the techniques used in the applied arts in the high Middle Ages. The work is divided into three books. The first covers the production and use of painting and drawing materials (painting techniques, paints, and ink), especially for illumination of texts and painting of walls. The second deals with the production of stained glass and techniques of glass painting, while the last deals with various techniques of goldsmithing and other metalwork. It also includes an introduction into the building of organs.

The First Book, on painting, is not particularly well-informed, but adequately reliable, the Second, on glass, is better, while most of the Third Book is clearly the work of a practising metalworker. It has recently been suggested that the apparent contradictory evidence as to dating, practical experience, and location of 'Theophilus' is best explained if the Schedula is understood to be a compilation.

The work has been translated into English, French, Polish, Portuguese, Spanish, Hungarian, German, Italian, Japanese, Bulgarian, Catalan and Russian, mostly in the 19th and 20th centuries.

== Biography ==
'Theophilus' was quite possibly a Benedictine monk. It has been suggested (particularly by Eckhard Freise) that Theophilus is the same person as the artisan monk Roger of Helmarshausen. Roger appears to have come from Stavelot Abbey in the Meuse River region, was active as an artist and author between 1100 and 1107 in St. Pantaleon's church in Cologne, and moved to Helmarshausen Abbey in 1107. The identity of the two men has been argued among researchers for some time, but Freise's conclusions have not yet been accepted by all researchers. Other suggestions have also been made, and at present there can not be said to be a consensus.

== Editions and translations ==
Two editions of Theophilus's work with English translations:

- Ilg, A., ed. (1874). "Theophilus Presbyter. Schedula diversarum artium". Quellenschriften für Kunstgeschichte (in German). Vol. 7. Vienna. (Edition.)
- Dodwell, C. R. The Various Arts. De Diversis Artibus. Oxford: Clarendon Press, 1961, reprinted 1986. (Edition with English translation.)
- Hendrie R. An Essay upon Various Arts in three Books by Theophilus called also Rugerus. London, 1847, 1961. (Edition with English translation.)
- Hawthorne, J. G. and C. S. Smith Theophilus: On Divers Arts. University of Chicago Press, 1963; reprinted New York: Dover Publications 1979; ISBN 0-486-23784-2. (English translation.)
