= Helmarshausen =

Village in Hesse, Germany

Coordinates: 51°37′52″N 9°27′34″E

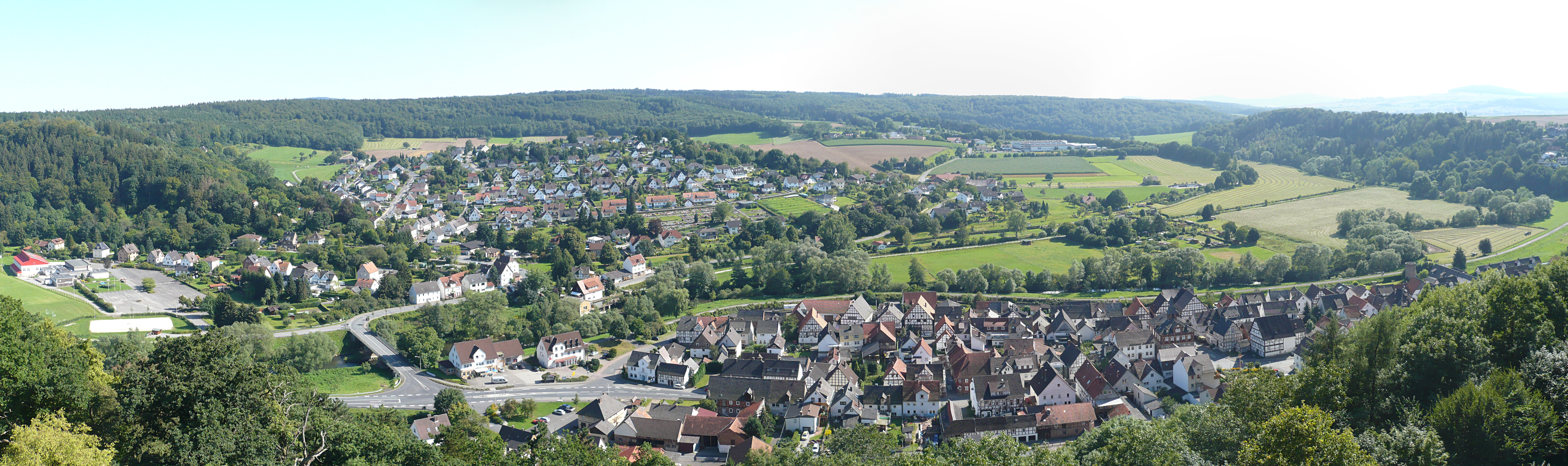

Helmarshausen is a village and a part (Stadtteil) of the town of Bad Karlshafen in Hesse, central Germany. It lies on the river Diemel, with an average elevation of 175 meters above the sea level. As of the year 2022, it had a population of 1,160.
