= Gospels of Henry the Lion =

Religious manuscript

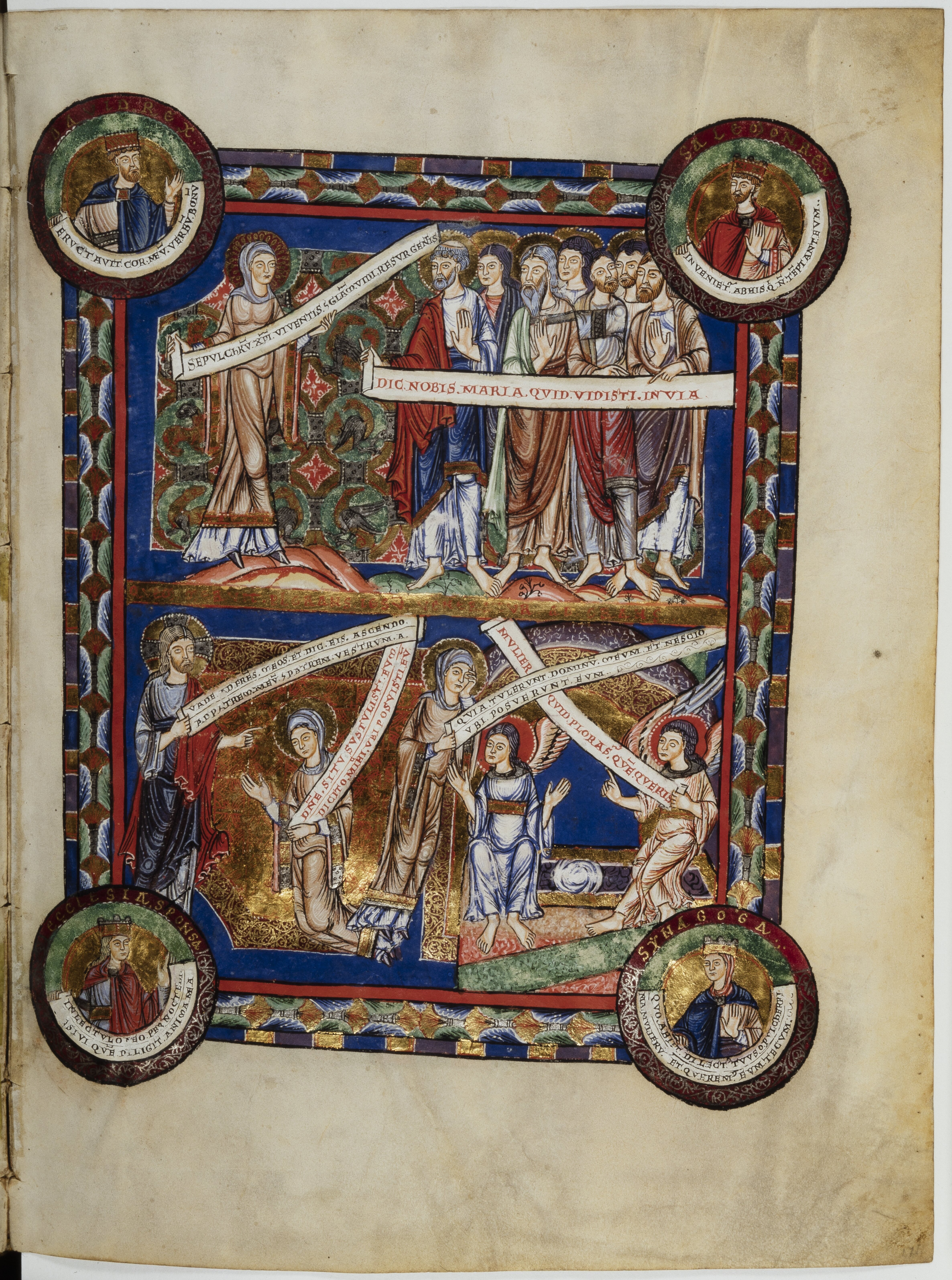
Miniature of Mary Magdalene with Christ, angel, and apostles (Wolfenbüttel, Herzog August Bibliothek, Cod. Guelf. 105 Noviss. 2°, f. 171r)

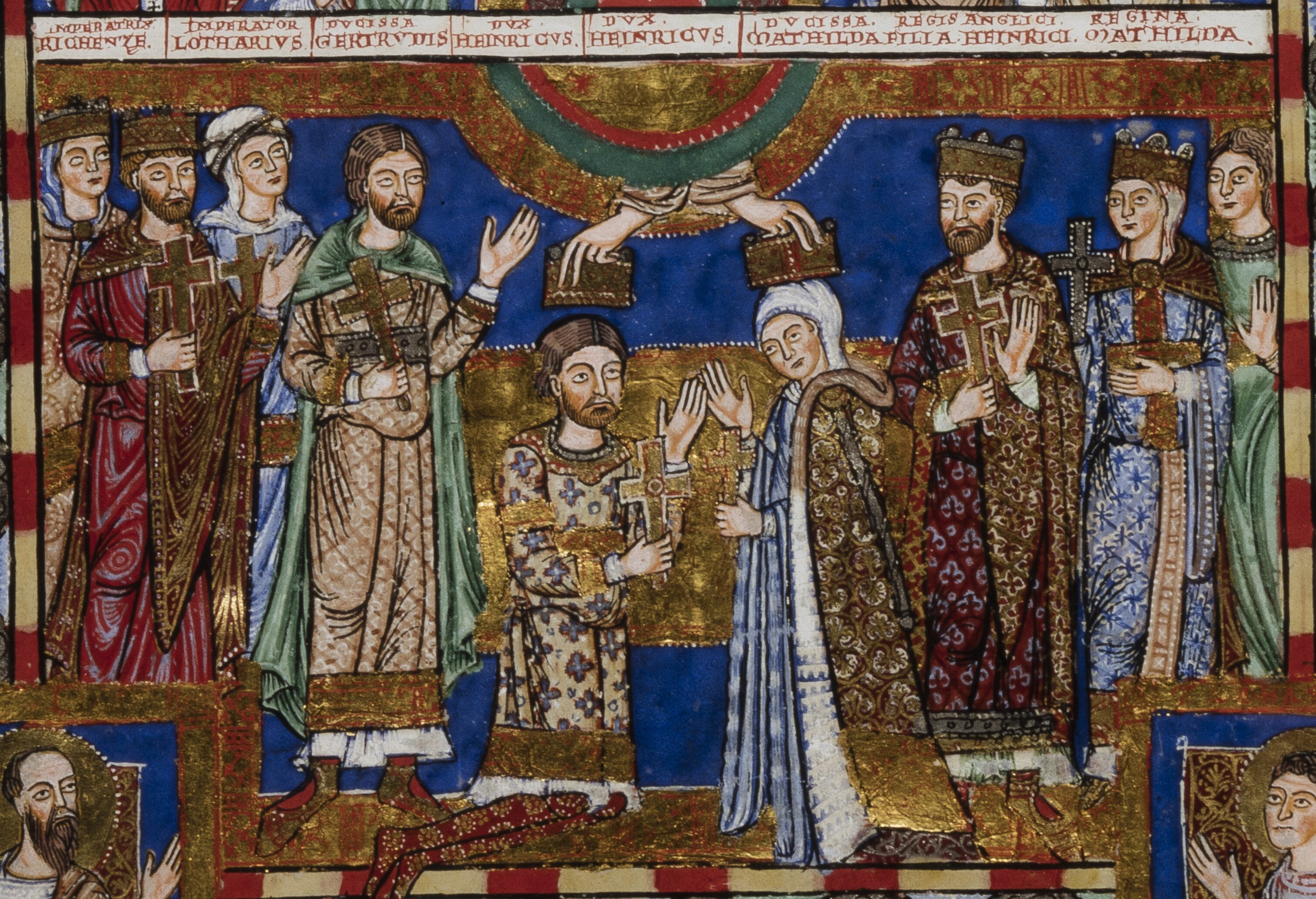
Henry the Lion at his ducal coronation alongside his wife Matilda of England. Illumination from the Gospel Book.

The Gospels of Henry the Lion were intended by Henry the Lion, Duke of Saxony, for the altar of the Virgin Mary in the church of St. Blaise's Abbey, Brunswick, better known as Brunswick Cathedral. The volume is considered a masterpiece of Romanesque book illumination of the 12th century.

== Creation and dating ==
The gospel book was made for the duke on commission at the Benedictine Helmarshausen Abbey. As for its date, the church in Brunswick was built in 1173, and the altar of the Virgin Mary was dedicated in 1188. The creation of the gospel book was formerly placed by most authorities at about 1175 ("early dating") but today the balance of opinion puts it at about 1188 ("late dating")

== Description and ownership ==
The manuscript, containing 266 pages with the text of the four gospels, 50 of them full page illustrations, was sold by auction on 6 December 1983 at Sotheby's in London for £8,140,000. The purchase price was raised, in the context of a German national initiative for the preservation of national treasures, by the German government, the Bundesländer of Lower Saxony and Bavaria, the Stiftung Preußischer Kulturbesitz and private donors (largely from Brunswick). It was the most expensive book in the world until 1994, when Bill Gates bought the Codex Leicester, a manuscript by Leonardo da Vinci.

== Location ==
The gospel book, preserved completely intact, with 50 full page miniatures, is kept in the Herzog August Bibliothek in Wolfenbüttel, and for security reasons is displayed only once every two years.

== See also ==
- Guelph Treasure
- List of most expensive books and manuscripts
