= Bernard Shapero =

British dealer in antiquarian rare books and works on paper

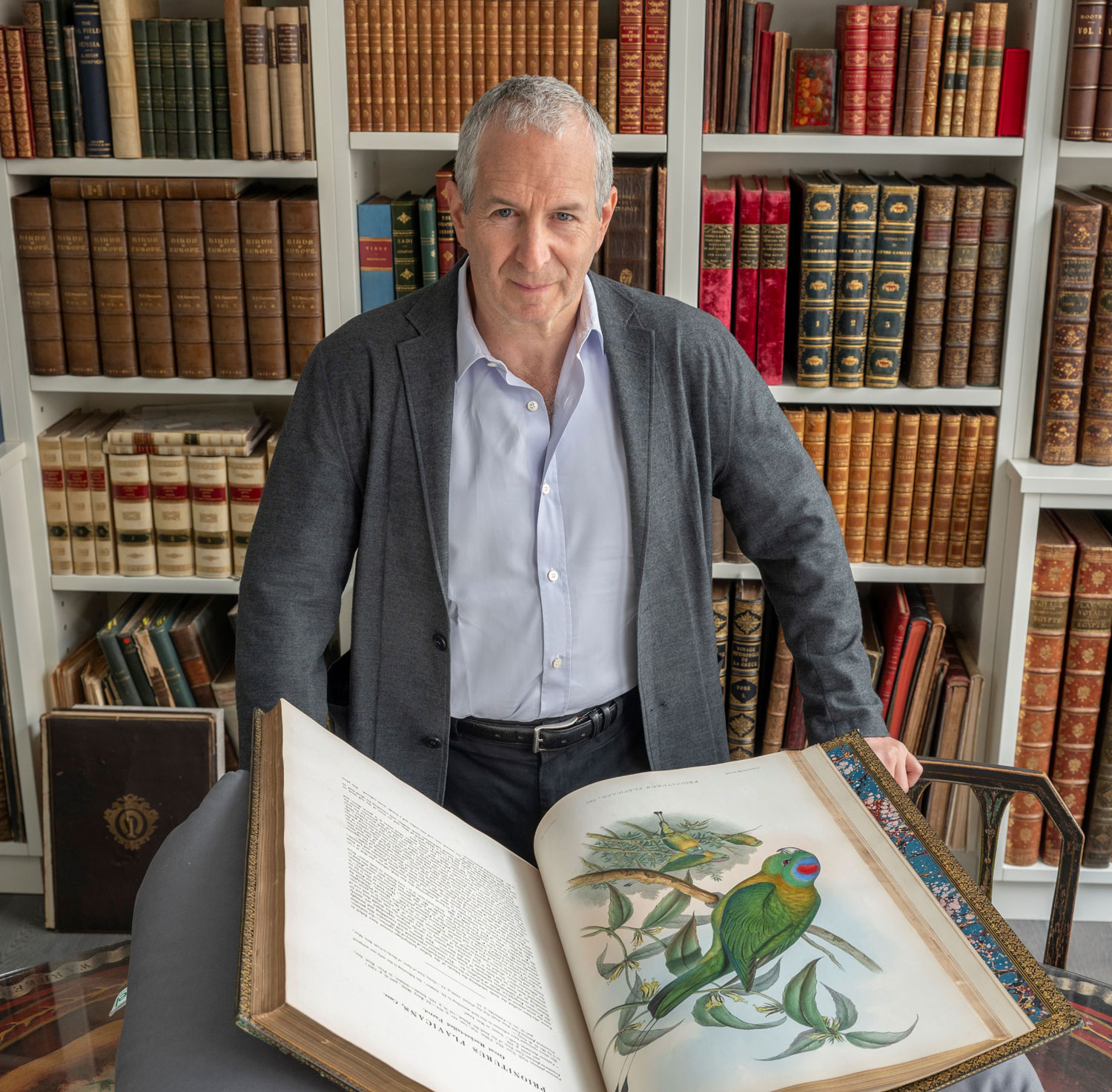
- Born: August 1963 (age 62); London
- Education: Highgate School
- Occupation: Rare book dealer
- Spouse: Emma Lewis
- Children: 3

Bernard John Shapero (born August 1963) is a British dealer in antiquarian rare books and works on paper, the founder of Shapero Rare Books of 94 New Bond Street, Mayfair, London. In 2005, Slate called him "London's most successful rare-book dealer and arguably the top dealer in the world today".

== Early life ==
Bernard John Shapero was born in August 1963, and started dealing in books in the late 1970s, while still a pupil at Highgate School. His father was a collector of armour and gold coins.

== Career ==
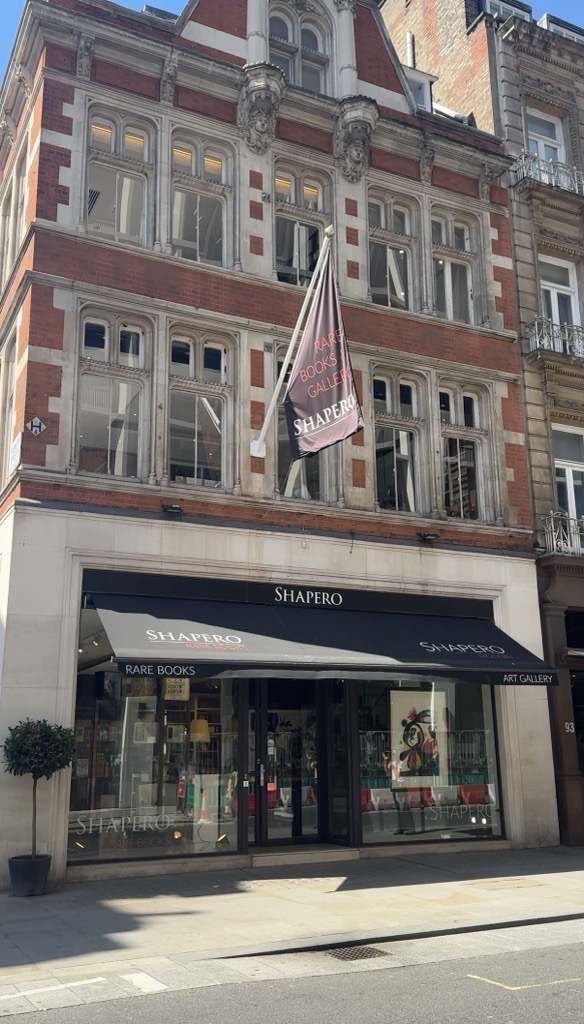
Shapero Rare Books, 94 New Bond Street, London W1S 1SJ

In October 2005, Shapero purchased the Doria Atlas for £1.46 million, the highest price ever paid for an atlas, although this record was surpassed by the Cosmographia the following year. In April 2004, the atlas had been saved from a fire at Wardington Manor in Oxfordshire, when local residents formed a human chain to remove items from the library.

Shapero Rare Books stocks about 10,000 rare books, maps and prints, ranging in price from £50 to over £200,000. The business was sold by Shapero to Philip Blackwell, and subsequently became part of the Scholium Group Limited.

== Personal life ==
Shapero lives in Hampstead, London, with his wife Emma Lewis, and their three children.
