= Gérard Lhéritier =

French manuscript dealer

- Born: 21 June 1948 (age 78); Nancy, France
- Occupation: Manuscript dealer
- Known for: Founder of Aristophil

Gérard Lhéritier (born 21 June 1948) is a French manuscript dealer and expert in balloon mail. He is (or was) a sponsor of the National Library of France and around 2004 was the buyer of the manuscript of the Marquis de Sade’s 120 Days of Sodom. In 1990 he founded Aristophil but in March 2015, was arrested by French police in connection with an investigation into a suspected pyramid scheme fraud at the firm. In 2012, he won the largest ever EuroMillions jackpot awarded in France at €170 million.

== Early life ==
Lhéritier was born on 21 June 1948, in Nancy, France, the son of a plumber from Lorraine. He grew up in Meuse, in Void-Vacon, and lived in Strasbourg until 1984 before moving to Nice.

== Early career ==
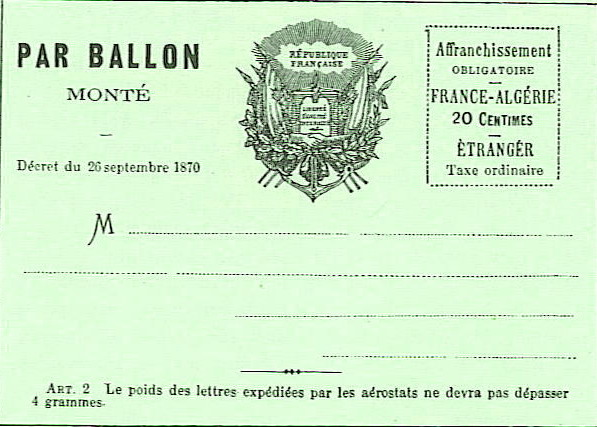
The address side of a balloon post card from the 1870 siege of Paris during the Franco-Prussian War.

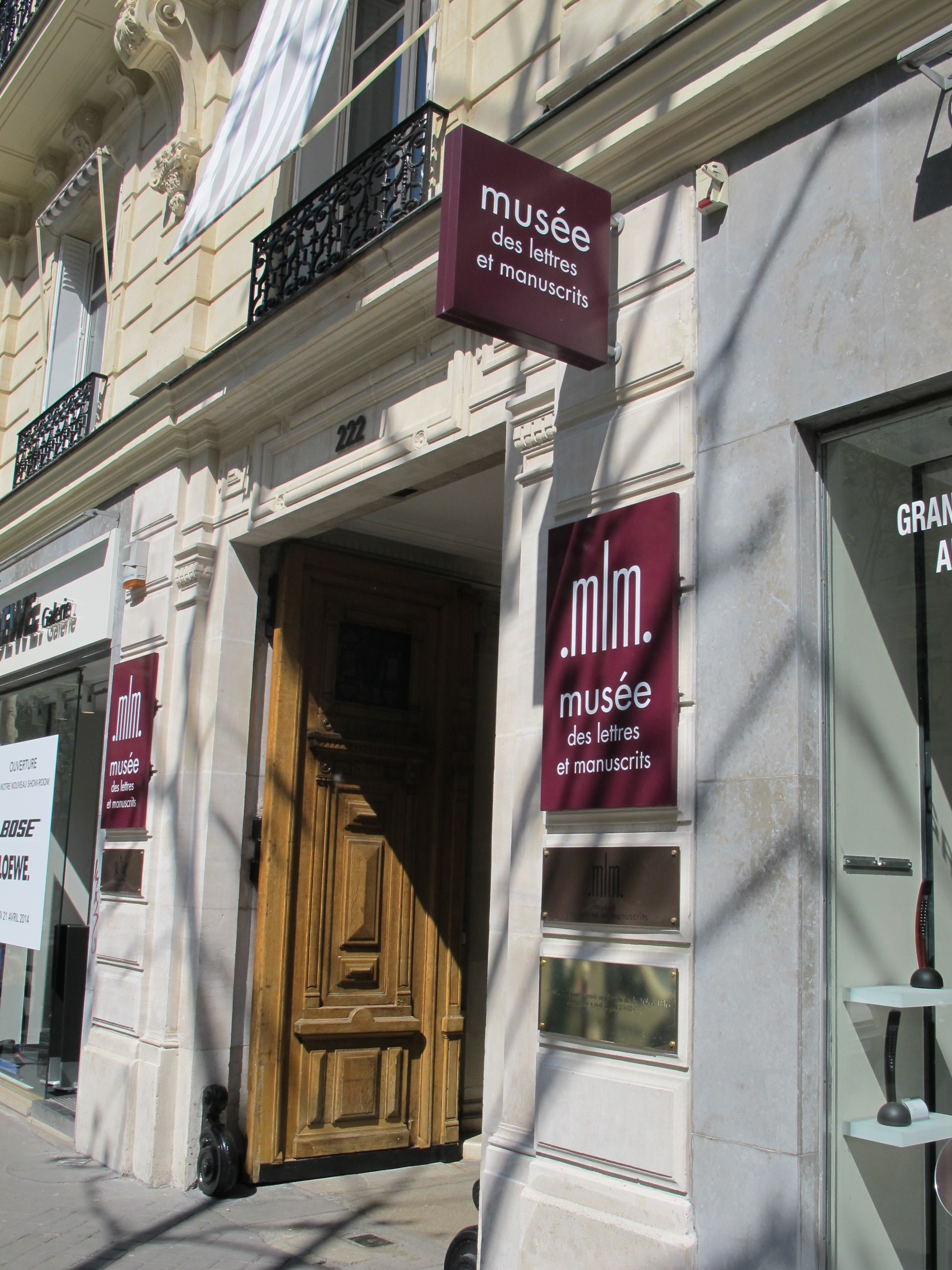
The former Musée des Lettres et Manuscrits.

Lhéritier served in the French army after which he was an asset manager.

In the early 1980s he discovered by chance in a stamp shop in Paris a letter marked "par ballon monté" while seeking a rare stamp for his son. This caused him to research balloon mail and write several books on the subject, including a novel, Les Ballons de la liberté (1995).

He is (or was) a sponsor of the National Library of France.

== Aristophil ==
In 1990, Lhéritier founded the company Aristophil in Nice, to buy historical manuscripts, letters and other documents, and then to sell shares in those items to investors.

In 2002, Lhéritier purchased 54 pages of correspondence between Albert Einstein and the Swiss mathematician Michele Besso for $559,500 at Christie’s New York. He divided these into 400 shares, which he sold to investors. His company, Aristophil, retained the right to buy back the shares at a higher price but did not commit itself to doing so.

He was the buyer, in about 2004, of the manuscript of the Marquis de Sade’s 120 Days of Sodom.

In 2004, Lhéritier established the Musée des Lettres et Manuscrits at 8 Rue de Nesle in Paris, and it moved to 222 Boulevard Saint-Germain in 2010. It closed in 2015/16, and its contents have been impounded by the French authorities.

In March 2015, Lhéritier was held in police custody in Paris, and released after posting bail of €2 million. He is under formal investigation for a suspected pyramid scheme fraud.

According to his lawyer, Francis Triboulet, nobody can claim with certainty to have lost money, because the manuscripts had not yet been sold, and their actual value is thus still unknown. The dealer Frederic Castaing, however, emphasises that true collectors "aren't that interested in the pecuniary value of a document. They love the touch of it, the sense of communing with a personage who is normally shut up in an encyclopedia" and argues that Lhéritier, "turn[ed] part of our cultural heritage into stocks and shares. It was detestable."

== Lottery win ==
In 2012, Lhéritier won the EuroMillions jackpot, with a prize of €170 million, the largest EuroMillions prize ever won in France. Lhéritier's lawyer, Francis Triboulet, says that he immediately invested €40 million of the prize money into his company Aristophil, which was "proof that it was legitimate".

== Selected publications ==
- Les ballons montés – Boules de Moulins – pigeongrammes – papillons de Metz – historique évaluation classification cotation, édition Valeurs Aristophil. Vol. 1: 1990, Vol. 2: 1992, Vol. 3: 1994.
- Les ballons montés, Plon, 1995. ISBN 2259182305
- Les Ballons de la liberté, 1995.
- Intime corruption, l'affaire des timbres rares de Monaco, L'Archipel, 2006. ISBN 2-84187-817-1
- Livre des valeurs et cotations (1870–1871), Plume, 2008.
- Valeurs et références – Collection 1870 – Ballons montés – Boules de Moulins, 2000, Aristophil.
