= Musée des Lettres et Manuscrits =

Defunct museum in Paris, France

Coordinates: 48.8555°N 2.3276°E

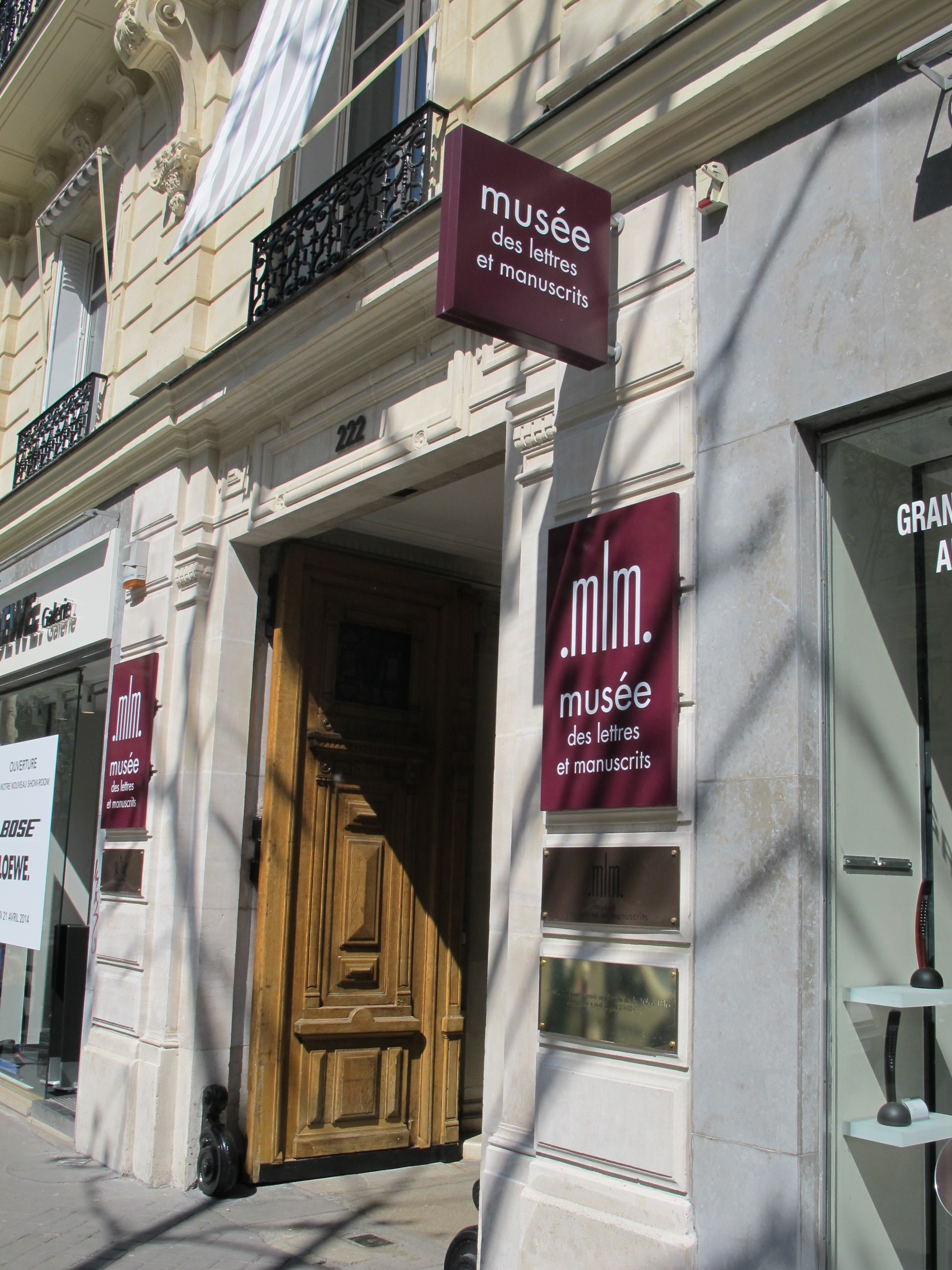
Entrance to the Musée des Lettres et Manuscrits in April 2014

The Musée des Lettres et Manuscrits (Museum of Letters and Manuscripts) was a museum of letters and manuscripts located at 222 Boulevard Saint-Germain in the 7th arrondissement of Paris, France, as well as in Brussels. It closed in 2014 after its owner Gérard Lhéritier and his company Aristophil were investigated for allegedly running the museum as an illegal Ponzi scheme.

== History ==
Gérard Lhéritier founded Aristophil in Nice in 1990, to buy historical manuscripts, letters and other documents, and then to sell shares in these items to investors. The museum was established in 2004 in a townhouse dating to 1608 at 8 Rue de Nesle; it reopened at the Boulevard Saint-Germain location in 2010.

In November 2014 the museum was closed and its contents impounded after Lhéritier and Aristophil came under investigation for allegedly running the company as an illegal Ponzi scheme. In March 2015, Lhéritier was held in police custody in Paris, and released after posting bail of €2 million. As of November 2015, the alleged fraud was described as involving €850–900 million and more than 18,000 investors.

== Collections ==
The museum contained nearly 136,000 original manuscripts and letters, including the cease-fire order signed by Dwight D. Eisenhower on May 7, 1945, poems of Paul Éluard, and a love-letter by Théodore Géricault.

== See also ==
- List of museums in Paris
