= Wardington Manor =

Manor house in Wardington, Oxfordshire, England

Coordinates: 52.110691°N 1.280926°W

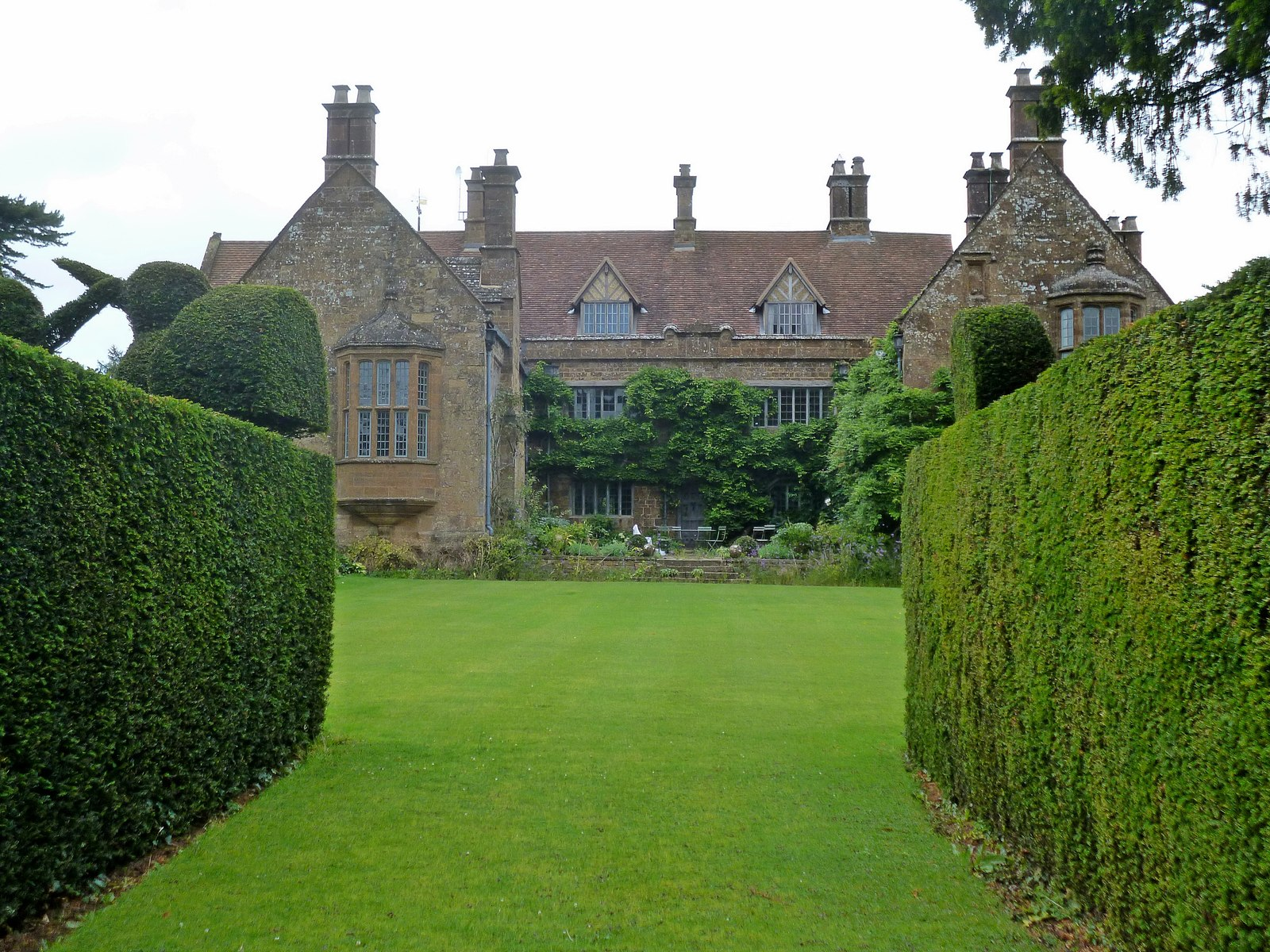
Wardington Manor, 2015

Wardington Manor lies between Lower and Upper Wardington in Oxfordshire. The house dates from the middle of the 16th century or possibly earlier. The house was remodelled in 1665 and twice early in the 20th century.

From 1917, Wardington Manor was the seat of John Pease, 1st Baron Wardington, and later Christopher Pease, 2nd Baron Wardington (1924–2005), and his wife Audrey White (1927–2014).

On 16 April 2004 the house was severely damaged by fire, mostly affecting the roof but has since been restored. It is a Grade II* listed building.
