= Michele Besso =

Swiss engineer (1873–1955)

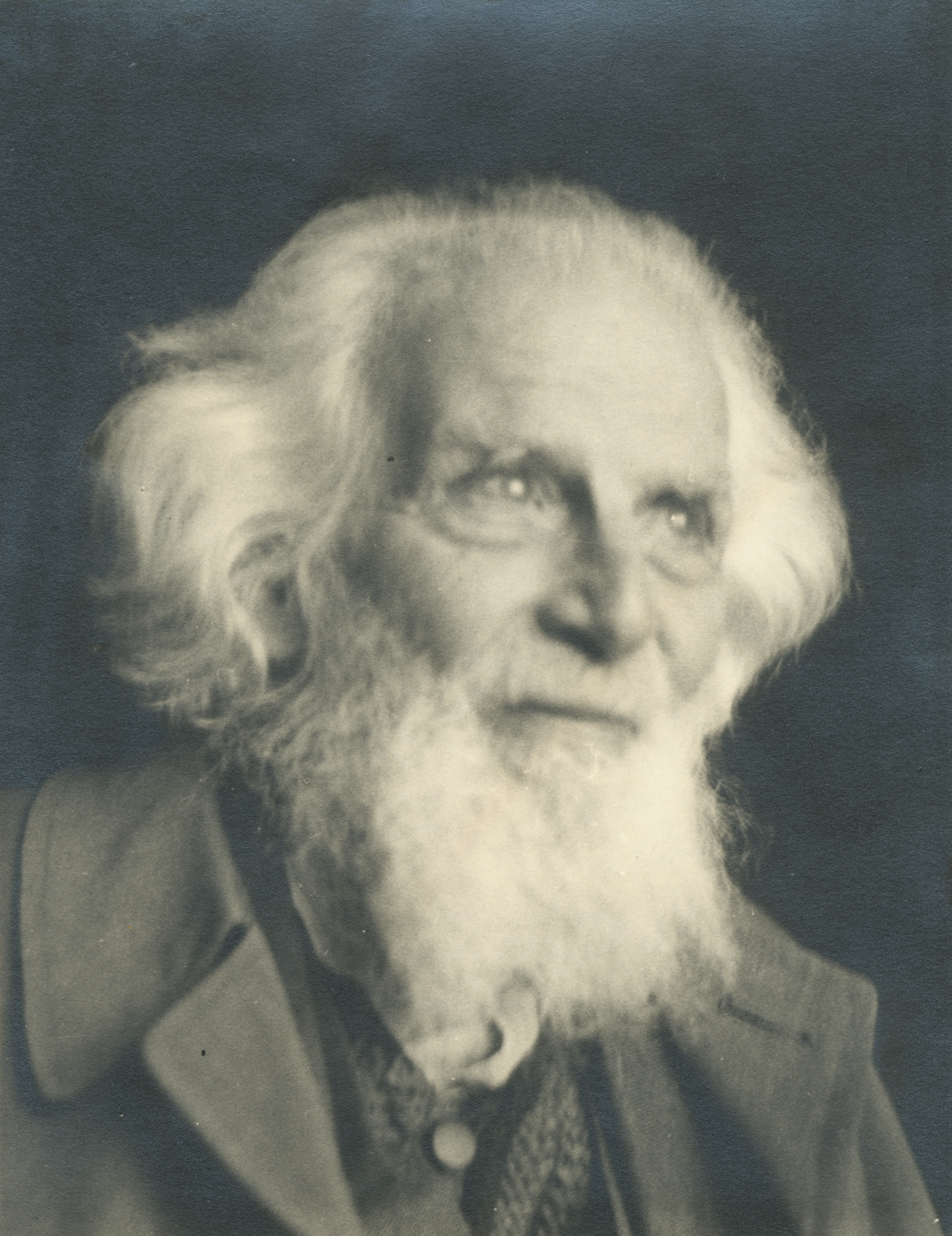
- Born: Michele Besso; 25 May 1873
- Died: 15 March 1955 (aged 81)

Michele Angelo Besso (25 May 1873 – 15 March 1955) was a Swiss-Italian engineer who worked closely with Albert Einstein.

== Biography ==
Besso was born in Riesbach from a family of Italian Jewish (Sephardi) descent. He was a close friend of Albert Einstein during his years at the Federal Polytechnic Institute in Zurich, (today known as ETH Zurich) and then at the patent office in Bern, where Einstein helped him to get a job. Besso is credited with introducing Einstein to the works of Ernst Mach, the sceptical critic of physics who influenced Einstein's approach to the discipline. Einstein introduced Besso to his future wife, Anna Winteler, the sister of Einstein's then girlfriend Maria Winteler.

Einstein called Besso "the best sounding board in Europe" for scientific ideas. In Einstein's original paper on special relativity, he ended the paper by stating, "In conclusion, let me note that my friend and colleague M. Besso steadfastly stood by me in my work on the problem here discussed, and that I am indebted to him for many a valuable suggestion."

Besso died in Geneva, aged 81. In a letter of condolence to the Besso family, Albert Einstein wrote, "Now he has preceded me a little in parting from this strange world, too. This means nothing. For us believing physicists the distinction between past, present, and future only has the meaning of an illusion, though a persistent one." Einstein died one month and three days after his friend, on 18 April 1955.

He was the nephew of Marco Besso, president of Assicurazioni Generali, and of the mathematician Davide Besso.

== See also ==
- Einstein's Dreams
- Genius, a television series depicting Einstein's life
