= Great Central Fair =

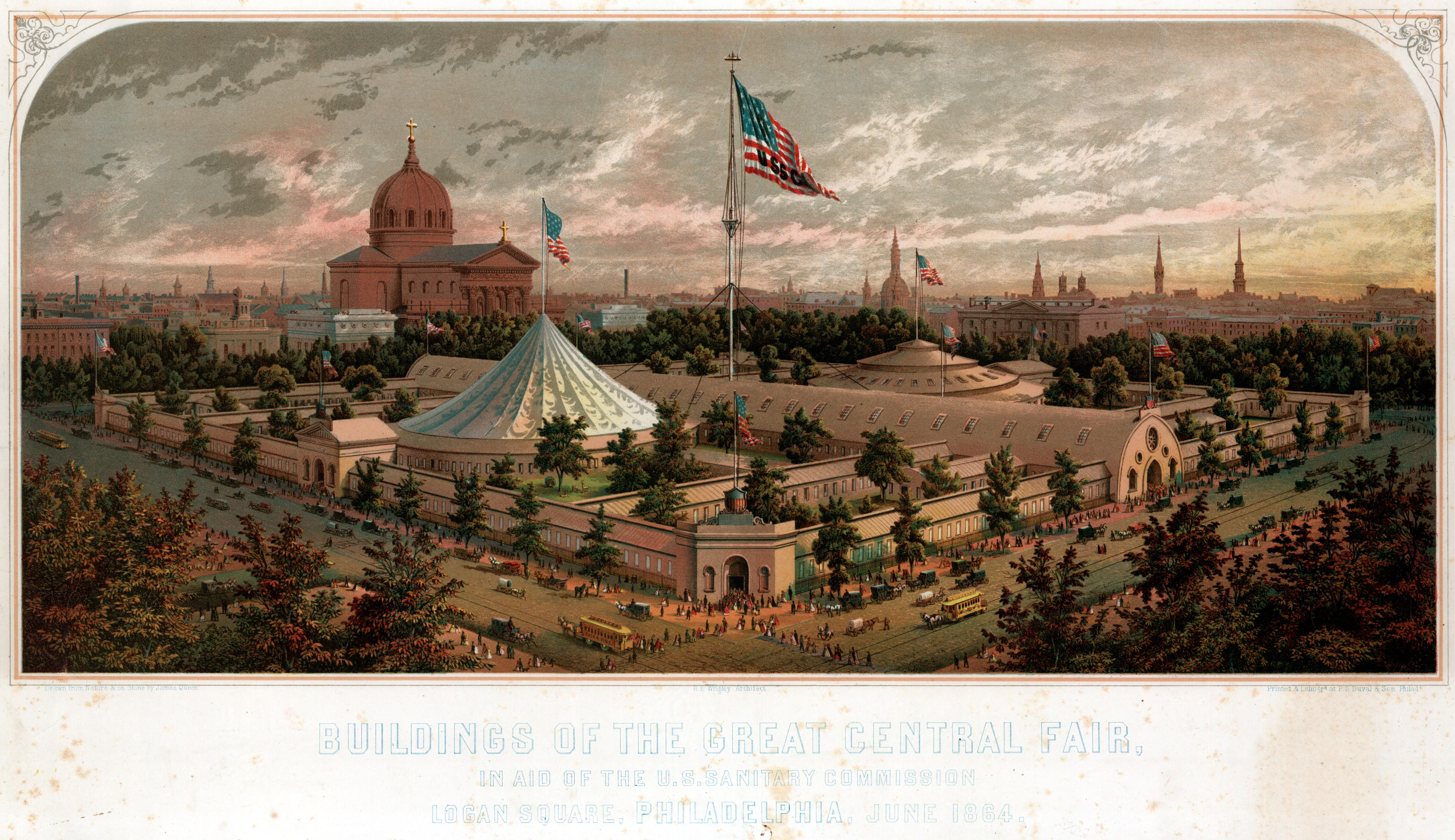
- Great Central Fair Buildings, Philadelphia an 1864 portrait of the fair by James Fuller Queen
- Date: June 7, 1864
- Location: Philadelphia, Pennsylvania, U.S.
- Type: Fundraising event

The Great Central Fair was a Sanitary Fair that happened in June 1864. It took place in Philadelphia, Pennsylvania. It was a fundraiser for the United States Sanitary Commission.

== History ==
The Great Central Fair took place from June 7 until June 28 of 1864 in the Logan Circle park in Philadelphia. It was inspired by past sanitary fairs that happened throughout the United States to raise funds for the United States Sanitary Commission.

The main exhibit building was 200,000 square feet in size. There was also Union Street, which was 540 feet long and ran in the middle of the fair. Union Street was compared to a cathedral by Charles J. Stille. Inside the main building were "departments" with different themes. Themes included the neighboring states of New Jersey and Delaware, themes about corn and sewing, a restaurant and parlor, as well as weaponry, fine art, curiosities, transportation and children's subjects.

On June 16, Abraham Lincoln and his family visited the fair. He donated 48 copies of the Emancipation Proclamation at $10 a book. They were all autographed by Lincoln. The festival raised over $1 million.
