= James Levine =

American conductor and pianist (1943–2021)

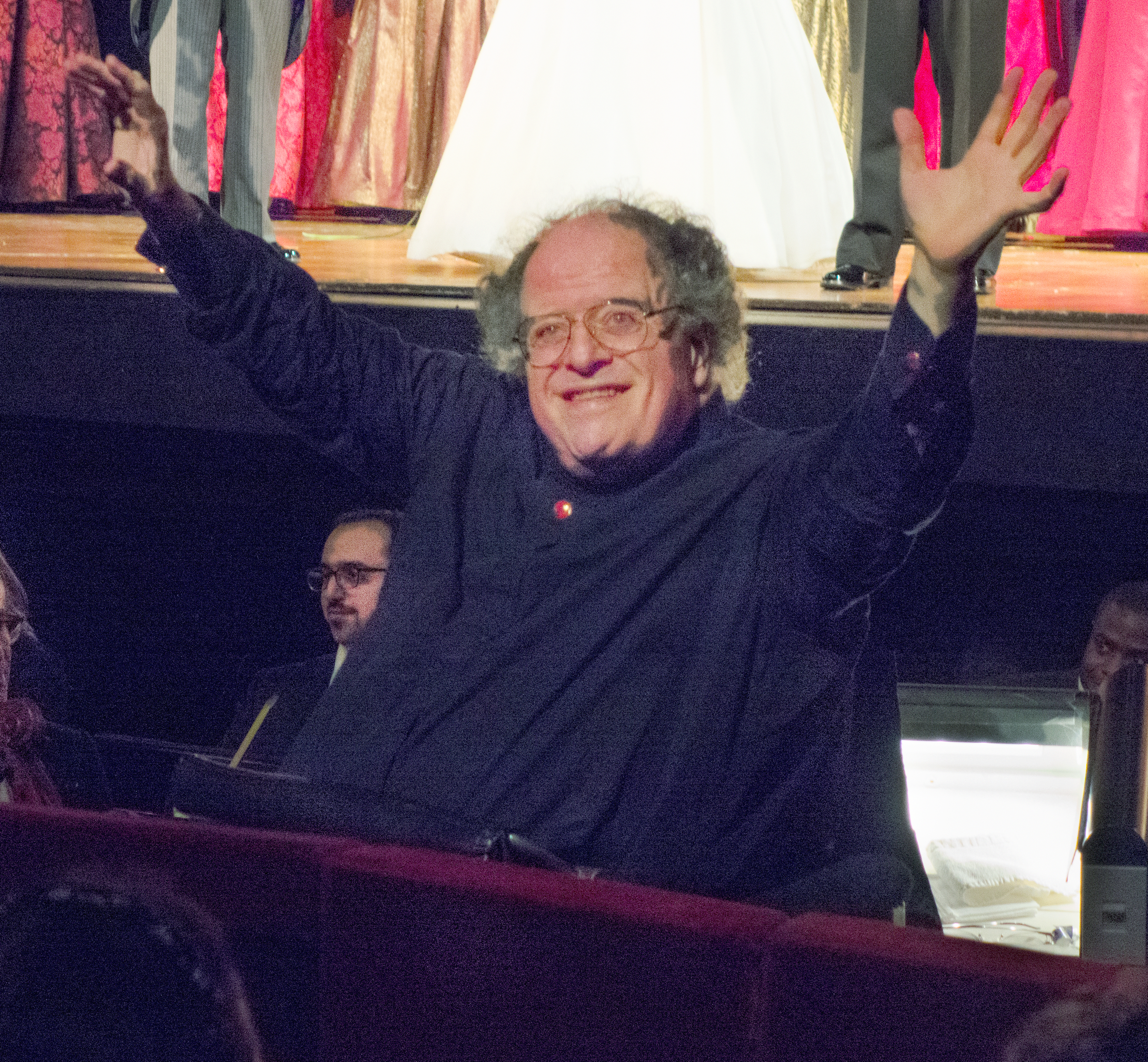
- Levine at the Met in 2013
- Born: James Lawrence Levine; June 23, 1943; Cincinnati, Ohio, U.S.
- Died: March 9, 2021 (aged 77); Palm Springs, California, U.S.
- Occupations: Conductor, pianist
- Years active: 1961–2017
- Known for: Music director of the Metropolitan Opera; Fantasia 2000
- Spouse: Suzanne Thomson (2020–2021)

James Lawrence Levine (/lɪˈvaɪn/ liv-EYEN; June 23, 1943 – March 9, 2021) was an American conductor and pianist. He was music director of the Metropolitan Opera from 1976 to 2016, and conducted 2,577 Met performances. At the end of his career, his reputation was tarnished by allegations of sexual misconduct stretching back half a century. Levine denied the claims, but the Met found them credible enough to fire him in 2018.

Levine debuted on the piano at age 10 as a soloist with the Cincinnati Symphony Orchestra. He studied under Walter Levin, Rudolf Serkin, and Rosina Lhévinne before enrolling at Juilliard School of Music, where he studied conducting with Jean Paul Morel. He graduated in 1964, and became an apprentice to George Szell with the Cleveland Orchestra. He debuted as a conductor at the Metropolitan Opera in 1971.

Levine held leadership positions with the Ravinia Festival, the Munich Philharmonic, and the Boston Symphony Orchestra. In 1980 he started the Lindemann Young Artists Development Program, and trained singers, conductors, and musicians for professional careers.

Levine took an almost two-year health-related hiatus from conducting from 2011 to 2013, during which time he held artistic and administrative planning sessions at the Met, and led training of the Lindemann Young Artists. He retired as the Met's full-time Music Director following the 2015–16 season to become Music Director Emeritus, retaining oversight of his young artist program and continuing some conducting activities.

In 2016–17, a number of men alleged Levine had molested them as student musicians several decades previously. Police investigations did not result in criminal charges, but music organizations such as the Ravinia Festival and the Boston Symphony Orchestra broke ties with him. After being fired from the Met, Levine sued his former employer for breach of contract and defamation, eventually reaching a confidential settlement that The New York Times reported to be $3.5 million.

Levine's performances were extensively recorded in audio and video. He appeared in the Disney film Fantasia 2000, and conducted all the music that was newly recorded for it with the Chicago Symphony Orchestra.

== Early years and personal life ==
Levine was born in Cincinnati, Ohio, to a musical Jewish family. His maternal grandfather was a composer and a cantor in a synagogue; his father, Lawrence, was a violinist who led dance bands under the name "Larry Lee" before entering his father's clothing business; and his mother, Helen Goldstein, was briefly an actress on Broadway, performing as "Helen Golden".

Levine had a brother, Tom, who was two years younger, who followed him to New York City from Cincinnati in 1974, and with whom he was very close. He employed Tom as his business assistant, looking after his affairs, arranging his rehearsal schedules, fielding queries, scouting out places to live, meeting with accountants, and accompanying Levine on trips to Europe. Tom was also a painter. His younger sister, Janet, is a marriage counselor.

Levine began to play the piano as a small child. On February 21, 1954, at age 10, he made his concert debut as soloist playing Felix Mendelssohn's Piano Concerto No. 2 at a youth concert of the Cincinnati Symphony Orchestra. He subsequently studied music with Walter Levin, first violinist in the LaSalle Quartet. In 1956 he took piano lessons with Rudolf Serkin at the Marlboro Music School in Vermont. The next year he began to study piano with Rosina Lhévinne at the Aspen Music School.

Levine graduated from Walnut Hills High School, a magnet school in Cincinnati. He entered the Juilliard School of Music in New York City in 1961, and took courses in conducting with Jean Morel. He graduated from Juilliard in 1964, and joined the American Conductors project connected with the Baltimore Symphony Orchestra.

Levine lived in The San Remo on Central Park West in New York City.

== Career ==
=== Early career ===
From 1964 to 1965, Levine served as an apprentice to George Szell with the Cleveland Orchestra. He then served as the orchestra's assistant conductor until 1970. That year, he also made debuts as guest conductor with the Philadelphia Orchestra at its summer home at Robin Hood Dell, the Welsh National Opera, and the San Francisco Opera. From 1965 to 1972 he concurrently taught at the Cleveland Institute of Music. In the summers, he worked at the Meadow Brook School of Music in Michigan and at the Ravinia Festival in Highland Park, Illinois, the summer home of the Chicago Symphony Orchestra. During that time, the charismatic Levine developed a devoted following of young musicians and music lovers.

In June 1971, Levine was called in at the last moment to substitute for István Kertész, to lead the Chicago Symphony Orchestra and Chorus in Mahler's Second Symphony for the Ravinia Festival's opening concert of their 36th season. This concert began a long association with the Chicago Symphony Orchestra. From 1973 to 1993 he was music director of the Ravinia Festival, succeeding the late Kertész. He made numerous recordings with the orchestra, including the symphonies and German Requiem of Johannes Brahms, and major works of Gershwin, Holst, Berg, Beethoven, Mozart, and others. In 1990, at the request of Roy E. Disney, he arranged the music and conducted the Chicago Symphony Orchestra and Chorus in the soundtrack of Fantasia 2000, released by Walt Disney Pictures. From 1974 to 1978, Levine also served as music director of the Cincinnati May Festival.

=== Metropolitan Opera ===
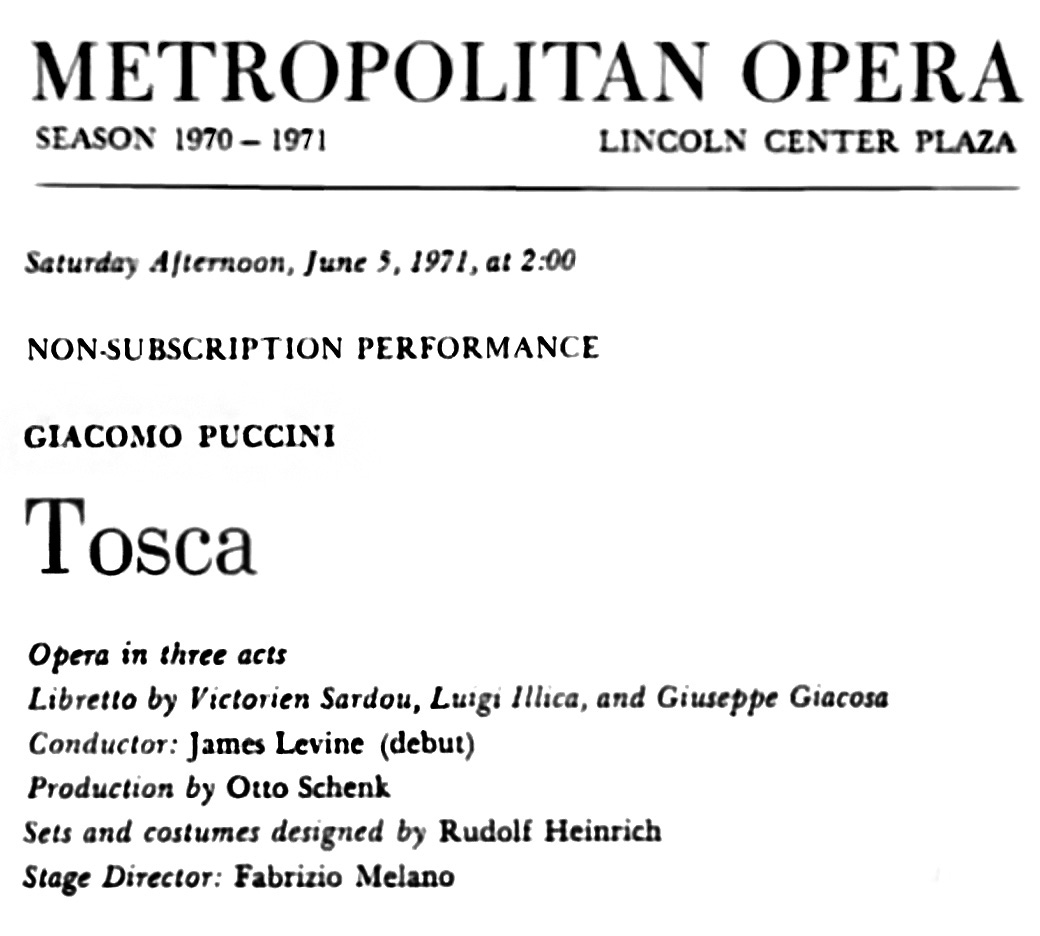
Program for Levine's Met debut on June 5, 1971

Levine made his Metropolitan Opera debut a few weeks before he turned 28, on June 5, 1971, leading a June Festival performance of Puccini's Tosca. After further appearances with the company, he was named its principal conductor in February 1972. He became its music director in 1975. In 1983, he served as conductor and musical director for the Franco Zeffirelli screen adaptation of Verdi's La Traviata, which featured the Met orchestra and chorus members. He became the company's first artistic director in 1986, and relinquished the title in 2004. In 2005, Levine's combined salary from the Boston Symphony Orchestra and the Met made him the highest-paid conductor in the country, at $3.5 million.

During Levine's tenure, the Metropolitan Opera orchestra expanded its activities into recording and concert series for the orchestra and chamber ensembles from the orchestra at Carnegie Hall. Levine led the Metropolitan Opera on many domestic and international tours. For the 25th anniversary of his Met debut, Levine conducted the world premiere of John Harbison's The Great Gatsby, commissioned for the occasion. On his appointment as general manager of the Met, Peter Gelb emphasized that Levine was welcome to remain as long as he wanted to direct music there. Levine was paid $2.1 million by the Met in 2010.

Following a series of injuries that began with a fall, Levine's health problems led to his withdrawal from many Metropolitan Opera engagements. After a May 2011 performance of Wagner's Die Walküre, Levine formally withdrew from all engagements at the Met. After two years of physical therapy, he returned to conducting with a May 2013 concert with the Metropolitan Opera Orchestra at Carnegie Hall. On September 25, 2013, Levine conducted his first Met performance since May 2011, in a revival production of Mozart's Così fan tutte. He was scheduled to conduct three productions at the opera house and three at Carnegie Hall in the 2013–14 season.

On April 14, 2016, Met management announced that Levine would step down from his position as music director at the end of the 2015–16 season. The Met paid him $1.8 million for the 2015–16 season. He assumed the new title of Music Director Emeritus, which he held until December 2017, when in the wake of allegations that he had sexually abused four young men, the Met suspended its relationship with him and canceled all his scheduled performances with the company.

In all, he conducted 2,577 performances at the Met, more than any other conductor and second only to tenor Charles Anthony for the most appearances with the company by an individual artist.

=== Boston Symphony Orchestra ===
Levine first conducted the Boston Symphony Orchestra (BSO) in April 1972. In October 2001, he was named its music director effective with the 2004–05 season, with an initial contract of five years, becoming the first American-born conductor to head the BSO.

One unique condition that Levine negotiated was increased flexibility of the time allotted for rehearsal, allowing the orchestra additional time to prepare more challenging works. After the start of his tenure, the orchestra also established an "Artistic Initiative Fund" of about $40 million to fund the more expensive of his projects.

One criticism of Levine during his BSO tenure is that he did not attend many orchestra auditions. A 2005 article reported that he had attended two out of 16 auditions during his tenure up to that time. Levine responded that he has the ability to provide input on musician tenure decisions after the initial probationary period, and that it is difficult to know how well a given player will fit the given position until that person has had a chance to work with the orchestra: "My message is the audition isn't everything."

Another 2005 report stated that during Levine's first season as music director, the greater workload from the demands of playing more unfamiliar and contemporary music had increased physical stress on some of the BSO musicians. Levine and the players met to discuss this, and he agreed to program changes to lessen these demands. He received general critical praise for revitalizing the orchestra's quality and repertoire since the beginning of his tenure.

Levine experienced ongoing health problems, starting with an onstage fall in 2006 that resulted in a torn rotator cuff and started discussion of how long Levine's tenure with the BSO would last. In April 2010, in the wake of his continuing health problems, it emerged that Levine had not officially signed a contract extension, so that he was the BSO's music director without a signed contract. On March 2, 2011, the BSO announced Levine's resignation as music director effective September 2011, after the Orchestra's Tanglewood season.

Working on a commission from Levine and the BSO, the composer John Harbison dedicated his Symphony No. 6 "in friendship and gratitude" to him, whose premature departure from the orchestra prevented him from conducting the premiere.

After allegations of his abusing a number of young men came out in December 2017 the BSO said Levine "will never be employed or contracted by the BSO at any time in the future".

=== Conducting in Europe ===
Levine's BSO contract limited his guest appearances with American orchestras, but he still conducted regularly in Europe, with the Vienna Philharmonic, Berlin Philharmonic, and at the Bayreuth Festival. Levine was a regular guest with the Philharmonia of London and the Staatskapelle Dresden. Beginning in 1975 he conducted regularly at the Salzburg Festival and the annual July Verbier Festival. From 1999 to 2004, he was chief conductor of the Munich Philharmonic, and was credited with improving the quality of instrumental ensemble during his tenure.

== Work with students ==
Levine initiated the Lindemann Young Artists Development Program at the Metropolitan Opera in 1980, a professional training program for graduated singers with, today, many famous alumni.

Levine was conductor of the UBS Verbier Festival Orchestra, the student resident orchestra at the annual summer music festival in Verbier, Switzerland, from 1999 through 2006. It was Levine's first long-term commitment to a student orchestra since becoming music director at the Met.

After becoming music director of the Boston Symphony Orchestra, Levine also served as music director of the Tanglewood Music Center, the BSO's acclaimed summer academy at Tanglewood for student instrumentalists, singers, composers, and conductors. There he conducted the Tanglewood Music Center Orchestra, directed fully staged opera performances with student singers, and gave master classes for singers and conductors.

Levine said in an interview:

At my age, you are naturally inclined towards teaching. You want to teach what you have learned to the next generation so that they don't have to spend time reinventing the wheel. I was lucky that I met the right mentors and teachers at the right moment. I love working with young musicians and singers, and those at the Tanglewood Music Center are unequivocally some of the finest and most talented in the world.

He continued to work with young students even when his health issues kept him from conducting. He was awarded the Lotus Award ("for inspiration to young musicians") from Young Concert Artists. Anthony Tommasini wrote in The New York Times in 2016: "The aspiring singers in the Met's young artist development program, one of many important ventures Mr. Levine started, must understand how lucky they are to have, as a teacher and mentor, a musician who even in his 20s worked at the Met with giants like Jon Vickers and Renata Tebaldi."

== Health problems and death ==
Levine experienced recurrent health issues beginning in 2006, including sciatica and what he called "intermittent tremors". On March 1, 2006, he tripped and fell onstage during a standing ovation after a performance with the Boston Symphony Orchestra and tore the rotator cuff in his right shoulder, leaving the remaining subscription concerts in Boston to his assistant conductor at the time. Later that month, Levine underwent surgery to repair the injury. He returned to the podium on July 7, 2006.

Levine withdrew from the majority of the Tanglewood 2008 summer season because of surgery required to remove a kidney with a malignant cyst. He returned to the podium in Boston on September 24, 2008, at Symphony Hall.

On September 29, 2009, it was announced that Levine would undergo emergency back surgery for a herniated disk. He missed three weeks of engagements.

In March 2010, the BSO announced that Levine would miss the remainder of the Boston Symphony season because of back pain. The Met also announced, on April 4, 2010, that he was withdrawing from the remainder of his performances for the season. According to the Met, Levine was required to have "corrective surgery for an ongoing lower back problem". He returned to conducting at the Met and the BSO at the beginning of the 2010–11 season, but in February 2011 canceled his Boston engagements for the rest of the season.

In the summer of 2011, Levine underwent further surgery on his back. In September 2011, after he fell down a flight of stairs, fractured his spine, and injured his back while on vacation in Vermont, the Met announced that he would not conduct at the Met at least for the rest of 2011.

After two years of surgery and physical therapy, Levine returned to conducting for the first time on May 19, 2013, in a concert with the Metropolitan Opera Orchestra at Carnegie Hall. Levine conducted from a motorized wheelchair, with a special platform designed to accommodate it, which could rise and descend like an elevator. He returned to the Met on September 24, 2013. The same type of platform was present in the Met orchestra pit for his September 2013 return performance.

For many years, both Levine and the Met denied as unfounded the rumors that Levine had Parkinson's disease. As New York magazine reported: "The conductor states flatly that the condition is not Parkinson's disease, as people had speculated in 'that silly Times piece.'" But in 2016, both he and the Met finally admitted that the rumors were true. Levine had in fact had Parkinson's since 1994. The Washington Post noted: "It wasn't just the illnesses, but the constant alternation between concealment and an excess of revelation that kept so much attention focused on them and away from the music."

Levine died in his Palm Springs home on March 9, 2021. Len Horovitz, his personal physician, announced Levine's death on March 17 and said that he had died of natural causes. There was no public funeral or memorial service, and his burial site was not publicly disclosed.

== Sexual assault allegations ==
Allegations of sexual assault by Levine came to a head at the end of 2017, when it was widely reported that four men had accused Levine of molesting them (starting when they were 16, 17, 17, and 20 years old, respectively) from the 1960s to the 1990s.

On December 2, 2017, it was publicly revealed that an October 2016 police report detailed that Levine had allegedly molested a male teenager for years. The alleged sexual abuse began while Levine was guest conductor at the Ravinia Music Festival, outside Chicago, where Levine was music director for the Chicago Symphony Orchestra's summer residencies from 1973 to 1993.

One accuser said that in the summer of 1968, when he was a 17-year-old high school student attending Meadow Brook School of Music in Michigan, Levine (then a 25-year-old faculty member) had sexual contact with a student. When he next saw Levine, the accuser told him that he would not repeat the sexual behavior, but asked if they could continue to make music as they had before; Levine said no. The accuser later played bass in the St. Paul Chamber Orchestra for decades and became a professor.

A second accuser said that during that same summer, Levine had sexual contact with a 17-year-old student and that Levine then initiated with the teenager a number of sexual encounters that have since haunted him. He said (and another male corroborated, on the condition of anonymity) that the next year, in Cleveland, where Levine was an assistant conductor of the Cleveland Orchestra, Levine on several occasions had sexual contact with that student and other students.

A third accuser, a violinist and pianist who grew up in Illinois near the Ravinia Music Festival, a summer program for aspiring musicians of which Levine was music director from 1971 to 1993, said Levine sexually abused him beginning when the accuser was 16 years old (and Levine was in his 40s) in 1986. He had previously detailed his accusation in 2016 in a report to the Lake Forest Police Department in Illinois. After a year of investigation, the department announced that Levine could not be charged criminally in Illinois because the accuser was 16 years old at the time of the alleged act, which met the age of consent at the time.

On December 4, 2017, a fourth man, who later had a long career as a violinist in the New Jersey Symphony Orchestra, said he had been abused by Levine beginning in 1968, when he was 20 years old and attending the Meadow Brook School of Music. Levine was a teacher in the summer program.

=== Reactions ===
The New York Times said that the Metropolitan Opera had known of at least one sexual abuse allegation against Levine as early as 1979, but dismissed it as baseless. Furthermore, Met officials (including general manager Peter Gelb, who was contacted directly by a police detective about the allegations in October 2016) had been aware of both the third accuser's abuse allegations since they were made in the 2016 police report, and of the attendant police investigation. The Met did not suspend Levine or launch an investigation of its own until over a year later, in December 2017.

In response to the December 2017 news article, the Met announced that it would investigate the sexual abuse allegations dating to the 1980s that were set forth in the 2016 police report. On December 3, after two other accusers came forward with allegations of abuse, the Met suspended its ties with Levine, and canceled all upcoming engagements with him. A fourth accuser came forward the following day.

For its part, the Ravinia Festival, in April 2017, six months after the criminal investigation of Levine began, created an honorific title for Levine—"Conductor Laureate"—and signed him to a five-year renewable contract to begin in 2018. On December 4, 2017, however, the Ravinia Festival severed all ties with Levine, and terminated his five-year contract to lead the Chicago Symphony Orchestra there.

The Boston Symphony Orchestra said Levine "will never be employed or contracted by the BSO at any time in the future". The Juilliard School, where Levine had studied, replaced him in a February 2018 performance where he was scheduled to lead the Juilliard Orchestra and singers from the Met's Lindemann Young Artist Development Program. On December 5, the Cincinnati May Festival canceled Levine's appearance in May. On December 7, in New Plymouth, New Zealand, the cinema chain Event Cinemas abruptly canceled the screening of a Met production of Levine conducting Mozart's Die Zauberflöte.

On December 8, Fred Child, host of the classical music radio show Performance Today, wrote that Levine "is accused of inflicting grievous harm to living members of our musical community. Out of respect for these people and their wounds, I choose not to broadcast performances featuring Mr. Levine on the podium."

Classical music blogger, former Village Voice music critic, and Juilliard School faculty member Greg Sandow said he had been contacted by three men over the years who said that Levine had abused them, and that reports of sexual abuse by Levine had been "widely talked about" for 40 years. Sandow added: "Everybody in the classical music business at least since the 1980s has talked about Levine as a sex abuser. The investigation should have been done decades ago." Some anonymous longtime Met employees said rumors about Levine's sexual behavior had been circulating since at least 1977.

Pulitzer Prize–winning music critic Justin Davidson wrote on the culture website of New York magazine, "James Levine's career has clearly ended" and "I'm not sure the Met can survive Levine's disgrace." Similarly, drama critic Terry Teachout of The Wall Street Journal wrote an article called "The Levine Cataclysm; How allegations against James Levine of sexual misconduct with teenagers could topple the entire Metropolitan Opera". The Washington Post music critic Anne Midgette noted: "The Met has known about these allegations for at least a year, and are only investigating them now that they are public", and opined on her Facebook page that the Met has "quite probably spent years protecting its star conductor from just this kind of allegation". Music critic Tim Pfaff of the LGBT Bay Area Reporter wrote that The New York Times chief classical music critic Anthony Tommasini had the "weirdest" reaction, "lamenting the ugliness of it all under a...headline, 'Should I Put Away My James Levine Recordings?' His conclusion was that he and his husband ... should move those recordings from their living room."

The Metropolitan Opera Orchestra applauded the courage of the four men who came forward with accusations that Levine had abused them. Local 802 of the American Federation of Musicians, a labor union that represents the Met's orchestra and Levine, said, "We are horrified and sickened by the recently reported allegations of sexual abuse by Mr. Levine."

Five days after news of the accusations by the four men broke, Levine called the claims "unfounded". The accusers stood by their claims, with one saying, "I will take a lie-detector test. Will he?" Six days later, music critic Arthur Kaptainis wrote in the Montreal Gazette that Levine's denial "had little effect".

=== Met response and lawsuit ===
On March 12, 2018, the Metropolitan Opera announced that Levine had been fired. The Met's investigation found Levine had "engaged in sexually abusive and harassing conduct towards vulnerable artists in the early stages of their careers".

Levine sued the Metropolitan Opera in New York State Supreme Court for breach of contract and defamation on March 15, 2018, three days after the company fired him, seeking more than $5.8 million in damages. The Met denied Levine's allegations. A year later, a New York State Supreme Court judge dismissed most of Levine's claims, but ruled that the Met and its attorney had made defamatory statements.

The Metropolitan Opera and Levine announced a settlement on undisclosed terms in August 2019. In September 2020, the size of the payout was indirectly exposed by annual disclosure statements required for nonprofits; Levine had received $3.5 million in the settlement. It is speculated he was able to negotiate such a large settlement due to the lack of a morals clause in his contract with the Met.

== Recordings ==
Levine made many audio and video recordings. He recorded extensively with many orchestras, and especially often with the Metropolitan Opera. His performance of Aida with Leontyne Price, her last in opera, was preserved on video and may be seen at the Met's own online archive of performances. Of particular note are his performances of Wagner's complete Der Ring des Nibelungen. A studio recording made for Deutsche Grammophon from 1987 to 1989 is on compact disc, and a 1989 live performance of the Ring is available on DVD. He also appears on several dozen albums as a pianist, collaborating with such singers as Jessye Norman, Kathleen Battle, Christa Ludwig, and Dawn Upshaw, as well as performing the chamber music of Franz Schubert and Francis Poulenc, among others.

Levine was featured in the animated Disney film Fantasia 2000. He conducted the Chicago Symphony Orchestra in the soundtrack recording of all the music in the film (with the exception of one segment from the original 1940 Fantasia). Levine is also seen in the film talking briefly with Mickey Mouse, just as his predecessor Leopold Stokowski did in the original film.

=== Discography ===
Release date (year)	Album details	Contributing artists	Label
1973	Verdi: Giovanna d'Arco	Plácido Domingo, Sherrill Milnes, Montserrat Caballé, Keith Erwen, Robert Lloyd, Ambrosian Opera Chorus, London Symphony Orchestra	EMI
1974	Verdi: I vespri siciliani	Martina Arroyo, Plácido Domingo, Sherrill Milnes, Ruggero Raimondi, Leo Goeke, Maria Ewing, James Morris, Richard Van Allan, John Alldis Choir, New Philharmonia Orchestra	RCA
1974	Bellini: Norma	Beverly Sills, Shirley Verrett, Enrico di Giuseppe, Paul Plishka, Robert Tear, John Alldis Choir, New Philharmonia Orchestra	EMI
1975	Prokofiev / Debussy / Webern: Cello Sonatas	Lynn Harrell, Levine as pianist	RCA
1975	Dvořák: Cello Concerto	Lynn Harrell, London Symphony Orchestra	RCA
1975	Mahler: Symphony No. 1	London Symphony Orchestra	RCA
1975	Rossini: The Barber of Seville	Beverly Sills, Nicolai Gedda, Sherrill Milnes, Renato Capecchi, Ruggero Raimondi, Fedora Barbieri, John Alldis Choir, London Symphony Orchestra	EMI
1975	Mahler: Symphony No. 4	Judith Blegen, Chicago Symphony Orchestra	RCA
1976	Brahms: Symphony No. 1	Chicago Symphony Orchestra	RCA
1976	Mahler: Symphony No. 3	Marilyn Horne, Chicago Symphony Orchestra and Chorus	RCA
1976	Schubert / Mendelssohn: Cello Sonatas	Lynn Harrel, Levine as pianist	RCA
1977	James Levine plays Scott Joplin	Levine as pianist	RCA
1977	Brahms: Symphony No. 3	Chicago Symphony Orchestra	RCA
1977	Giordano: Andrea Chénier	Plácido Domingo, Renata Scotto, Sherrill Milnes, Jean Kraft, Maria Ewing, Michel Sénéchal, Allan Monk, Enzo Dara, Gwendolyn Killebrew, Piero de Palma, John Alldis Choir, National Philharmonic Orchestra	RCA
1977	Verdi: La forza del destino	Leontyne Price, Plácido Domingo, Sherrill Milnes, Fiorenza Cossotto, Bonaldo Giaiotti, Gabriel Bacquier, Michel Sénéchal, Kurt Moll, Gillian Knight, John Alldis Choir, London Symphony Orchestra	RCA
1977	Beethoven: Complete Cello Sonatas	Lynn Harrell, Levine as pianist	RCA
1978	Brahms: Symphony No. 2	Chicago Symphony Orchestra	RCA
1978	Verdi: Otello	Plácido Domingo, Renata Scotto, Sherrill Milnes, Frank Little, Paul Plishka, Jean Kraft, Ambrosian Opera Chorus, National Philharmonic Orchestra	RCA
1978	Cilea: Adriana Lecouvreur	Renata Scotto, Plácido Domingo, Sherrill Milnes, Elena Obraztsova, Lillian Watson, Ann Murray, Ambrosian Opera Chorus, Philharmonia Orchestra	CBS Masterworks
1978	Brahms: Symphony No. 4	Chicago Symphony Orchestra	RCA
1978	Mahler: Symphonies Nos. 5 & 10	The Philadelphia Orchestra	RCA
1978	Stravinsky: Petrouchka (1947 version)	Chicago Symphony Orchestra	RCA
1979	Mahler: Symphony No. 9	The Philadelphia Orchestra	RCA
1979	Mascagni: Cavalleria rusticana	Renata Scotto, Plácido Domingo, Pablo Elvira, Isola Jones, Jean Kraft, Ambrosian Opera Chorus, National Philharmonic Orchestra	RCA
1979	Mahler: Symphony No. 6	London Symphony Orchestra	RCA
1980	Puccini: La bohème	Renata Scotto, Alfredo Kraus, Sherrill Milnes, Carol Neblett, Paul Plishka, Matteo Manuguerra, Renato Capecchi, John Noble, Ambrosian Opera Chorus, National Philharmonic Orchestra	EMI
1980	Bellini: Norma	Renata Scotto, Tatiana Troyanos, Giuseppe Giacomini, Paul Plishka, Ann Murray, Ambrosian Opera Chorus, National Philharmonic Orchestra	CBS Masterworks
1981	Mahler: Symphony No. 10 (final version)	The Philadelphia Orchestra	RCA
1981	Puccini: Tosca	Renata Scotto, Plácido Domingo, Renato Bruson, Renato Capecchi, Itzhak Perlman, Ambrosian Opera Chorus, Philharmonia Orchestra	EMI
1981	Schumann: Piano Quintet / Brahms: String Quartet No. 3	Lasalle Quartet, Levine as pianist	Deutsche Grammophon
1981	Mozart: Die Zauberflöte	Ileana Cotrubaș, Eric Tappy, Christian Boesch, Martti Talvela, Zdislava Donat, José van Dam, Rachel Yakar, Trudeliese Schmidt, Wiener Staatsopernchor, Wiener Philharmoniker	RCA
1982	Dvořák: Symphony No. 9 "From the New World"	Chicago Symphony Orchestra	RCA
1982	Mahler: Symphony No. 7	Chicago Symphony Orchestra	RCA
1982	Mozart: Symphonies Nos. 40 & 41	Chicago Symphony Orchestra	RCA
1983	In Concert at the Met	Leontyne Price, Marilyn Horne, Metropolitan Opera Orchestra	RCA (recorded live from the Met on March 28, 1982)
1983	Mozart: Eine kleine Nachtmusik / Posthorn Serenade	Wiener Philharmoniker	Deutsche Grammophon
1983	Mozart: Violin Concertos Nos. 3 & 5	Itzhak Perlman, Wiener Philharmoniker	Deutsche Grammophon
1984	Schubert: Symphony No. 9	Chicago Symphony Orchestra	Deutsche Grammophon
1984	Brahms: Ein Deutsches Requiem	Kathleen Battle, Håkan Hagegård, Chicago Symphony Orchestra and Chorus	RCA
1984	Beethoven: Piano Concertos Nos. 3 & 4	Alfred Brendel, Chicago Symphony Orchestra	Philips (live recording)
1984	Brahms: Piano Concerto No. 1	Emanuel Ax, Chicago Symphony Orchestra	RCA
1984	Beethoven: Piano Concertos Nos. 1 & 2	Alfred Brendel, Chicago Symphony Orchestra	Philips (live recording)
1985	Orff: Carmina Burana	June Anderson, Bernd Weikl, Philip Creech, Chicago Symphony Orchestra and Chorus	Deutsche Grammophon
1985	Mendelssohn: A Midsummer Night's Dream	Judith Blegen, Florence Quivar, Chicago Symphony Orchestra and Chorus	Deutsche Grammophon
1985	Dvořák: Symphony No. 7	Chicago Symphony Orchestra	RCA
1985	Ravel: Daphnis et Chloé	Wiener Philharmoniker	Deutsche Grammophon
1985	Beethoven: Piano Concerto No. 5 / Piano Sonata No. 24	Alfred Brendel, Chicago Symphony Orchestra	Philips (live recording)
1985	Tchaikovsky: Symphony No. 6	Chicago Symphony Orchestra	RCA
1986	Mozart: Violin Concertos Nos. 2 & 4	Itzhak Perlman, Wiener Philharmoniker	Deutsche Grammophon
1986	Mozart: Symphonies Nos. 25, 26 & 27	Wiener Philharmoniker	Deutsche Grammophon
1986	Mozart: Symphonies Nos. 30, 31 & 32	Wiener Philharmoniker	Deutsche Grammophon
1986	Mozart: Symphonies Nos. 29 & 34	Wiener Philharmoniker	Deutsche Grammophon
1986	Mozart: Violin Concerto No. 1 / Adagio, K. 261 / Rondos	Itzhak Perlman, Wiener Philharmoniker	Deutsche Grammophon
1986	Smetana: Má vlast	Wiener Philharmoniker	Deutsche Grammophon
1986	Strauss: Ariadne auf Naxos	Anna Tomowa-Sintow, Agnes Baltsa, Kathleen Battle, Gary Lakes, Hermann Prey, Otto Schenk, Heinz Zednik, Kurt Rydl, Barbara Bonney, Dawn Upshaw, Wiener Philharmoniker	Deutsche Grammophon
1987	Mozart: Symphonies Nos. 28 & 33	Wiener Philharmoniker	Deutsche Grammophon
1987	Saint-Saëns: Symphony No. 3 / Dukas: The Sorcerer's Apprentice	Simon Preston, Berliner Philharmoniker	Deutsche Grammophon
1987	Wagner: Parsifal	Simon Estes, Matti Salminen, Hans Sotin, Peter Hofmann, Franz Mazura, Waltraud Meier, Chor und Orchester der Bayreuther Festspiele	Philips (live recording)
1987	Smetana: Moldau / Vyšehrad	Wiener Philharmoniker	Deutsche Grammophon
1987	Berg / Webern / Schoenberg: Orchestral Pieces	Berliner Philharmoniker	Deutsche Grammophon
1987	Sibelius / Dvořák: Violin Concertos	Shlomo Mintz, Berliner Philharmoniker	Deutsche Grammophon
1987	Mozart / Beethoven: Quintets for Piano and Winds	Ensemble Wien-Berlin, Levine as pianist	Deutsche Grammophon
1988	Schumann: Symphonies Nos. 2 & 3	Berliner Philharmoniker	Deutsche Grammophon
1988	Mozart: Symphonies Nos. 21, 22, 23 & 24	Wiener Philharmoniker	Deutsche Grammophon
1988	Tchaikovsky: Eugene Onegin	Thomas Allen, Mirella Freni, Anne Sofie von Otter, Neil Shicoff, Paata Burchuladze, Michel Sénéchal, Rosemarie Lang, Ruthild Engert, Rundfunkchor Leipzig, Staatskapelle Dresden	Deutsche Grammophon
1988	Wagner: Die Walküre	Gary Lakes, Kurt Moll, James Morris, Jessye Norman, Hildegard Behrens, Christa Ludwig, Marita Napier, Marilyn Mims, Ruthild Engert, Metropolitan Opera Orchestra	Deutsche Grammophon
1988	Schubert: Lieder	Kathleen Battle, Levine as pianist	Deutsche Grammophon
1988	Mozart: Symphonies Nos. 35 & 36	Wiener Philharmoniker	Deutsche Grammophon
1989	Mozart: Great Mass in C minor	Kathleen Battle, Lella Cuberli, Peter Seiffert, Kurt Moll, Wiener Staatsopernchor, Wiener Philharmoniker	Deutsche Grammophon
1989	Mendelssohn: Symphonies Nos. 3 & 4	Berliner Philharmoniker	Deutsche Grammophon
1989	Wagner: Das Rheingold	James Morris, Siegfried Jerusalem, Siegfried Lorenz, Ekkehard Wlaschiha, Heinz Zednik, Kurt Moll, Jan-Hendrik Rootering, Christa Ludwig, Birgitta Svendén, Metropolitan Opera Orchestra	Deutsche Grammophon
1989	Mozart: Così fan tutte	Kiri Te Kanawa, Ann Murray, Thomas Hampson, Hans Peter Blochwitz, Marie McLaughlin, Ferruccio Furlanetto, Wiener Staatsopernchor, Wiener Philharmoniker	Deutsche Grammophon
1989	Live in Tokyo 1988	Kathleen Battle, Plácido Domingo, Metropolitan Opera Orchestra	Deutsche Grammophon (live recording from June 1988)
1989	Saint-Saëns / Lalo: Cello Concertos / Bruch: Kol Nidrei	Matt Haimovitz, Chicago Symphony Orchestra	Deutsche Grammophon
1989	Poulenc: Chamber Music	Ensemble Wien-Berlin, Levine as pianist	Deutsche Grammophon
1990	Holst: The Planets	Chicago Symphony Orchestra	Deutsche Grammophon
1990	Mozart: Symphonies Nos. 40 & 41	Wiener Philharmoniker	Deutsche Grammophon
1990	Mozart / Bellini / Strauss: Oboe Concertos	Hansjörg Schellenberger, Berliner Philharmoniker	Deutsche Grammophon
1990	Donizetti: L'elisir d'amore	Kathleen Battle, Luciano Pavarotti, Leo Nucci, Enzo Dara, Dawn Upshaw, Metropolitan Opera Chorus and Orchestra	Deutsche Grammophon
1990	Berlioz: Roméo et Juliette / Les nuits d'été	Anne Sofie von Otter, Philip Langridge, James Morris, RIAS-Kammerchor, Berliner Philharmoniker	Deutsche Grammophon
1991	Bartók: Concerto for Orchestra / Music for Strings, Percussion and Celesta	Chicago Symphony Orchestra	Deutsche Grammophon
1991	Spirituals In Concert	Kathleen Battle, Jessye Norman, mixed ensemble	Deutsche Grammophon (live recording from Carnegie Hall, March 18, 1990)
1991	Mozart: Le nozze di Figaro	Thomas Hampson, Kiri Te Kanawa, Dawn Upshaw, Ferruccio Furlanetto, Anne Sofie von Otter, Tatiana Troyanos, Paul Plishka, Renato Capecchi, Metropolitan Opera Chorus and Orchestra	Deutsche Grammophon
1991	Haydn: The Creation	Kathleen Battle, Gösta Winbergh, Kurt Moll, Rundfunkchor Stockholm, Berliner Philharmoniker	Deutsche Grammophon
1991	Mozart: Symphonies Nos. 25 & 38	Wiener Philharmoniker	Deutsche Grammophon
1991	Verdi: Aida	Aprile Millo, Plácido Domingo, Dolora Zajick, James Morris, Samuel Ramey, Metropolitan Opera Chorus and Orchestra	Sony Classical
1991	Wagner: Götterdämmerung	Reiner Goldberg, Bernd Weikl, Matti Salminen, Ekkehard Wlaschiha, Hildegard Behrens, Cheryl Studer, Hanna Schwarz, Helga Dernesch, Metropolitan Opera Chorus and Orchestra	Deutsche Grammophon
1991	Wagner: Siegfried	Reiner Goldberg, Heinz Zednik, James Morris, Ekkehard Wlaschiha, Kurt Moll, Birgitta Svendén, Hildegard Behrens, Kathleen Battle, Metropolitan Opera Orchestra	Deutsche Grammophon
1991	Salzburg Recital	Jessye Norman, Levine as pianist	Philips (live recording from April 1990)
1991	Berlioz: Symphonie fantastique	Berliner Philharmoniker	Deutsche Grammophon
1992	Berg: Violin Concerto / Rihm: Time Chant	Anne-Sophie Mutter, Chicago Symphony Orchestra	Deutsche Grammophon
1992	Beethoven: Missa Solemnis	Cheryl Studer, Jessye Norman, Plácido Domingo, Kurt Moll, Rundfunkchor Leipzig, Wiener Philharmoniker	Deutsche Grammophon
1992	Verdi: La traviata	Cheryl Studer, Wendy White, Luciano Pavarotti, Juan Pons, Anthony Laciura, Metropolitan Opera Chorus and Orchestra	Deutsche Grammophon
1992	Verdi: Luisa Miller	Jan-Hendrik Rootering, Plácido Domingo, Florence Quivar, Paul Plishka, Vladimir Chernov, Aprile Millo, Wendy White, Metropolitan Opera Chorus and Orchestra	Sony Classical
1992	Berlioz: Requiem / Overtures	Luciano Pavarotti, Ernst Senff Chor Berlin, Berliner Philharmoniker	Deutsche Grammophon
1992	Schumann: Symphonies Nos. 1 & 4 / Manfred Overture	Berliner Philharmoniker	Deutsche Grammophon
1992	Mozart: Coronation Mass / Haydn: Missa in tempore belli	Sylvia McNair, Delores Ziegler, Hans Peter Blochwitz, Andreas Schmidt, RIAS-Kammerchor, Berliner Philharmoniker	Deutsche Grammophon
1992	Wagner: Siegfried-Idyll / Schoenberg: Verklärte Nacht / Strauss: Metamorphosen	Berliner Philharmoniker	Deutsche Grammophon
1993	Mussorgsky: Pictures at an Exhibition / Stravinsky: The Rite of Spring	Metropolitan Opera Orchestra	Deutsche Grammophon
1993	Gershwin: Rhapsody in Blue / An American in Paris / Porgy and Bess Suite	Chicago Symphony Orchestra	Deutsche Grammophon
1993	Verdi: Ballet Music	Metropolitan Opera Orchestra	Sony Classical
1993	Schoenberg: Erwartung / Brettl-Lieder	Jessye Norman, Metropolitan Opera Orchestra	Philips
1993	Wagner: Overtures & Preludes	Metropolitan Opera Orchestra	Deutsche Grammophon
1993	Stravinsky: Oedipus Rex	Philip Langridge, Florence Quivar, James Morris, Jan-Hendrik Rootering, Jules Bastin, Chicago Symphony Chorus and Orchestra	Deutsche Grammophon
1993	Puccini: Manon Lescaut	Mirella Freni, Luciano Pavarotti, Dwayne Croft, Giuseppe Taddei, Ramón Vargas, Cecilia Bartoli, Metropolitan Opera Chorus and Orchestra	Decca
1993	Sibelius: Symphony No. 2 / Finlandia / Valse triste	Berliner Philharmoniker	Deutsche Grammophon
1993	Schubert: Trout Quintet	Wolfgang Schulz, Wolfram Christ, Göran Söllscher, Georg Faust	Deutsche Grammophon
1993	Carmen-Fantasie	Anne-Sophie Mutter, Wiener Philharmoniker	Deutsche Grammophon
1993	Verdi: Don Carlo	Ferruccio Furlanetto, Michael Sylvester, Vladimir Chernov, Samuel Ramey, Paul Plishka, Aprile Millo, Dolora Zajick, Kathleen Battle, Dwayne Croft, Metropolitan Opera Chorus and Orchestra	Sony Classical
1994	Tchaikovsky: Ballet Suites	Wiener Philharmoniker	Deutsche Grammophon
1994	Verdi: Il trovatore	Vladimir Chernov, Aprile Millo, Dolora Zajick, Plácido Domingo, James Morris, Metropolitan Opera Chorus and Orchestra	Sony Classical
1994	Beethoven: Symphony No. 3 / Schubert: Symphony No. 8	Metropolitan Opera Orchestra	Deutsche Grammophon

=== Videography ===
- Mozart: La clemenza di Tito (1980), Vienna Philharmonic, Deutsche Grammophon, 00440-073-4128
- Richard Strauss: Elektra (1981), Deutsche Grammophon, 0-44007-34111-7
- Mozart: Idomeneo (1982), Deutsche Grammophon, 00440-073-4234
- Richard Strauss: Der Rosenkavalier (1982), Met Opera, 8-1135-70133-0-4
- Verdi: La Traviata (1983), Deutsche Grammophon, 00440-073-4364
- Verdi: Ernani (1983), Deutsche Grammophon, 0-044007-432280
- The Metropolitan Opera Centennial Gala (1983), Deutsche Grammophon, 00440-073-4538
- Bizet: Carmen (1989), Deutsche Grammophon, 0-44007-30009-1
- Wagner: Der Ring des Nibelungen (1990), Deutsche Grammophon, 0-44007-30439-6
  - Das Rheingold, Deutsche Grammophon, 0-44007-30369-6
  - Die Walküre, Deutsche Grammophon, 0-44007-30499-6
  - Siegfried, Deutsche Grammophon, 0-44007-30379-6
  - Götterdämmerung, Deutsche Grammophon, 0-44007-30409-6
- Mozart: The Magic Flute (1991), Deutsche Grammophon, 0-44007-30039-8
- The Metropolitan Opera Gala 1991, Deutsche Grammophon, 00440-073-4582
- Verdi: Falstaff (1992), Deutsche Grammophon, 0-44007-34532-0
- Verdi: Stiffelio (1993), Deutsche Grammophon, 0-44007-34288-6
- James Levine's 25th Anniversary Metropolitan Opera Gala (1996), Deutsche Grammophon, B0004602-09
- Verdi: Aida (2000), Deutsche Grammophon, 0-44007-30019-0
- Verdi: Un ballo in maschera (2002), Deutsche Grammophon, 0-44007-30299-6
- Verdi: Simon Boccanegra (2002), Deutsche Grammophon, 0-44007-30319-1
- Richard Strauss: Ariadne auf Naxos (2002), Deutsche Grammophon, 0-44007-34010-3
- Beethoven: Fidelio (2003), Deutsche Grammophon, 0-4407-30529-4
- Puccini: Turandot (2003), Deutsche Grammophon, 0-44007-30589-8
- Verdi: Rigoletto (2004), Deutsche Grammophon, 0-44007-30939-1
- Wagner: Tristan und Isolde (2004), Deutsche Grammophon, 0-44007-30449-5
- Wagner: Die Meistersinger von Nürnberg (2004), Deutsche Grammophon, 00440-073-0949
- Verdi: Nabucco (2005), Deutsche Grammophon, 0-44007-30779-3
- Verdi: Don Carlo (2005) Deutsche Grammophon, 0-44007-34085-1
- Verdi: La forza del destino(2005), Deutsche Grammophon, 0-44007-34076-9
- Puccini: La bohème (2005), Deutsche Grammophon, 0-44007-34025-7
- Donizetti: L'elisir d'amore (2005), Deutsche Grammophon, 0-44007-34021-9
- Mozart: Don Giovanni (2005), Deutsche Grammophon, 0-44007-34010-3
- Mozart: Idomeneo, (2006), Deutsche Grammophon, 0-44007-34234-3
- Verdi: Luisa Miller (2006), Deutsche Grammophon, 0044007340271
- Wagner: Tannhäuser (2006), Deutsche Grammophon, 0-44007-34171-1
- Wagner: Lohengrin (2006), Deutsche Grammophon, 0-44007-34176-6
- Zandonai: Francesca da Rimini (2007), Deutsche Grammophon, 0-44007-34313-5
- Berlioz: Les Troyens (2007), Deutsche Grammophon, 0-44007-34310-4
- Alban Berg: Lulu (2011), Sony Music, 0886979100992
- Mozart: The magic flute, Sony Music, 0886979101395
- Mascagni: Cavallera rusticana (2011), Sony Music, 0886979100893
- Donizetti: Don Pasquale (2011), Deutsche Grammophon, 0-44007-34635-8
- Wagner: in Der Ring des Nibelungen (2012), Deutsche Grammophon, 0-44007-34771-3 :
  - Das Rheingold (2010), Deutsche Grammophon, 0-44007-34841-3
  - Die Walküre (2011), Deutsche Grammophon, 0-44007-34848-2

== Honors ==
Among the awards listed in his Met biography are:

- 1980 – Manhattan Cultural Award
- 1982 – first of eight Grammy Awards
- 1984 – Named "Musician of the Year" by Musical America
- 1986 – Smetana Medal (presented by the former Czechoslovakia)
- 1997 – National Medal of Arts
- 1999 – Wilhelm Furtwängler Prize from the Committee for Cultural Advancement of Baden-Baden, Germany
- 2003 – Kennedy Center Honors
- 2005 – Award for Distinguished Service to the Arts from the American Academy of Arts and Letters
- 2006 – Opera News Award
- 2009 – Award in the Vocal Arts from Bard College
- 2009 – Ditson Conductors Award from Columbia University
- 2010 – National Endowment for the Arts Opera Honoree
- 2010 – George Peabody Award from Peabody Conservatory at Johns Hopkins University
- 2010 – elected an honorary member of the American Academy of Arts and Letters

In addition, his biography says Levine has received honorary doctorates from the University of Cincinnati, the New England Conservatory of Music, Northwestern University, the State University of New York, and the Juilliard School. On May 3, 2018, SUNY revoked Levine's honorary doctorate in response to the sexual abuse allegations against him.

Preceded by Rafael Kubelík	Music director, Metropolitan Opera; 1976–2016	Succeeded by Yannick Nézet-Séguin
Preceded by Sergiu Celibidache	Chief Conductor, Munich Philharmonic; 1999–2004	Succeeded by Christian Thielemann
Preceded by Seiji Ozawa	Music director, Boston Symphony Orchestra; 2004–2011	Succeeded by Andris Nelsons
