= K-162 =

K162 or K-162 may refer to:

== Military ==
- Soviet submarine K-222, originally numbered K-162

== Music ==
- Symphonies by Wolfgang Amadeus Mozart:
  - Symphony No. 22, given the Köchel catalogue number K. 162
  - Symphony No. 23, numbered K. 162b

== Transportation ==
- K-162 (Kansas highway)
