= Symphony No. 23 (Mozart) =

1773 work by W. A. Mozart

- by W. A. Mozart
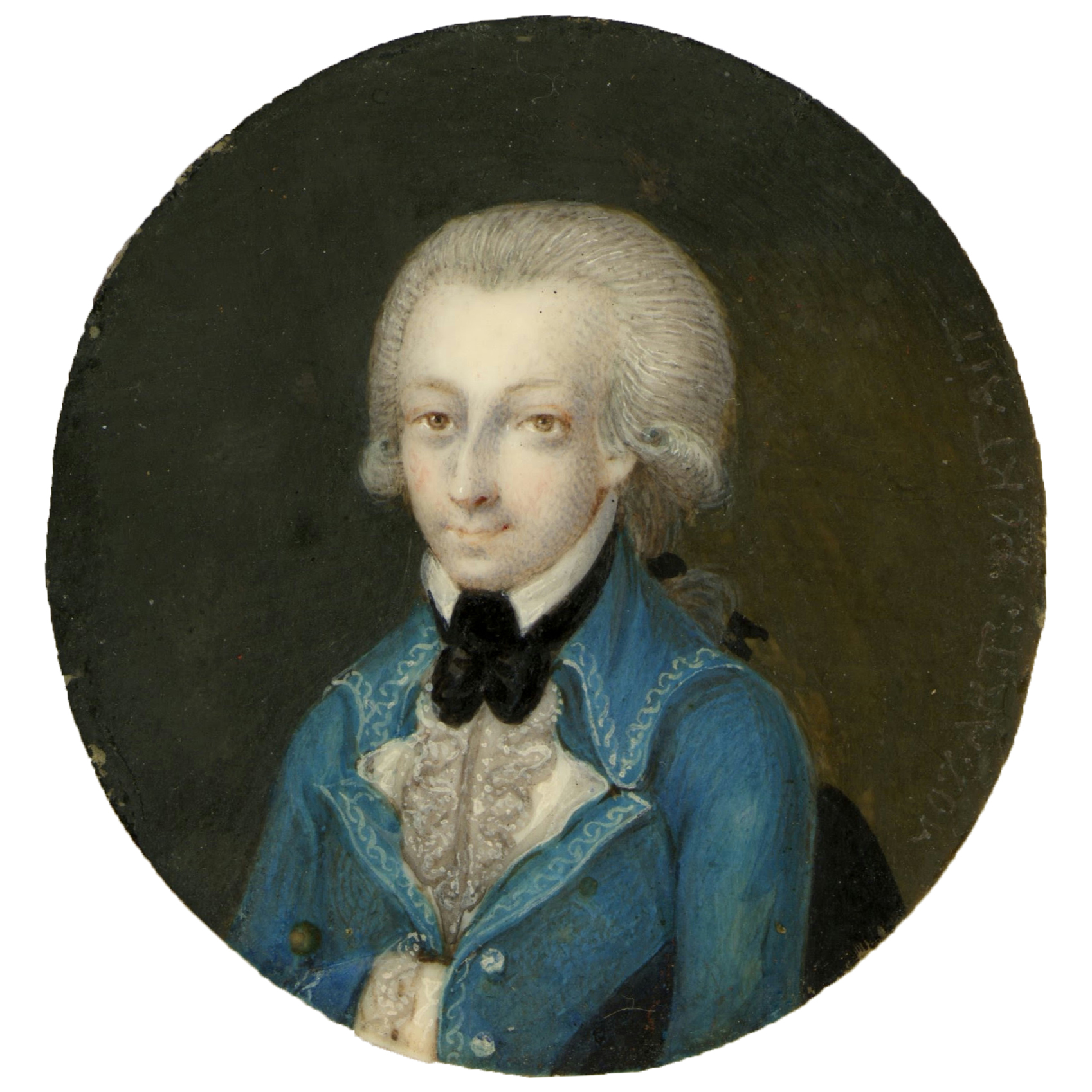
- 1773 miniature of Mozart
- Key: D major
- Catalogue: K. 181/162b
- Composed: 19 May 1773: Salzburg
- Published: 1848: Hamburg
- Publisher: August Cranz
- Duration: c. 9 minutes
- Movements: 3
- Scoring: Orchestra

The Symphony No. 23 in D major, K. 181/162b, by Wolfgang Amadeus Mozart was dated as complete on May 19, 1773. It is sometimes called "Overture", even though the autograph score bears the title "Sinfonia". The symphony is scored for 2 oboes, 2 horns in D, 2 trumpets in D, and strings.

== Background ==
The genre of the symphony was key in the Classical period, becoming the most important genre of instrumental music. Multiple musical local traditions existed in Europe at the time, which Mozart absorbed during his travels through most of Western Europe. In the Mozart family grand tour from between 1763 and 1766, Wolfgang wrote around 15 symphonies, many of which have not been preserved. More symphonies were written during Mozart's stays in Vienna (1767–68) and Italy (1769–71).

== Composition ==
The symphony was completed on 19 May 1773, being part of a group of four (No. 22, 24 and 26) written shortly after the return from the third travel to Italy. According to Saint-Foix, these symphonies may have been commissioned by a Milanese patron.

According to musicologist Neal Zaslaw, the symphony found success at the time, as sets of parts were found in the cities of Brno, Frankfurt and Regensburg. These copies also modified the scoring of the piece; viola parts were reduced to a single one and the trumpets were removed in the parts found in Brno and Frankfurt, while the Regensburg ones had the possibility of oboes being replaced by flutes. The original 1773 autograph is located at the Morgan Library & Museum in New York.

=== Instrumentation ===
The symphony is scored for 2 oboes, 2 horns in D, 2 trumpets in D, and strings. Neal Zaslaw notes additional parts for bassoon, timpani, and continuo (probably harpsichord).

== Form ==
The symphony follows the overall tripartite structure of the Italian overture, divided in three movements that are played continuously (attacca)

1. Allegro spiritoso, 4/4 in D major
2. Andantino grazioso, 3/8 in G major
3. Presto assai, 2/4 in D major

== Assessment ==
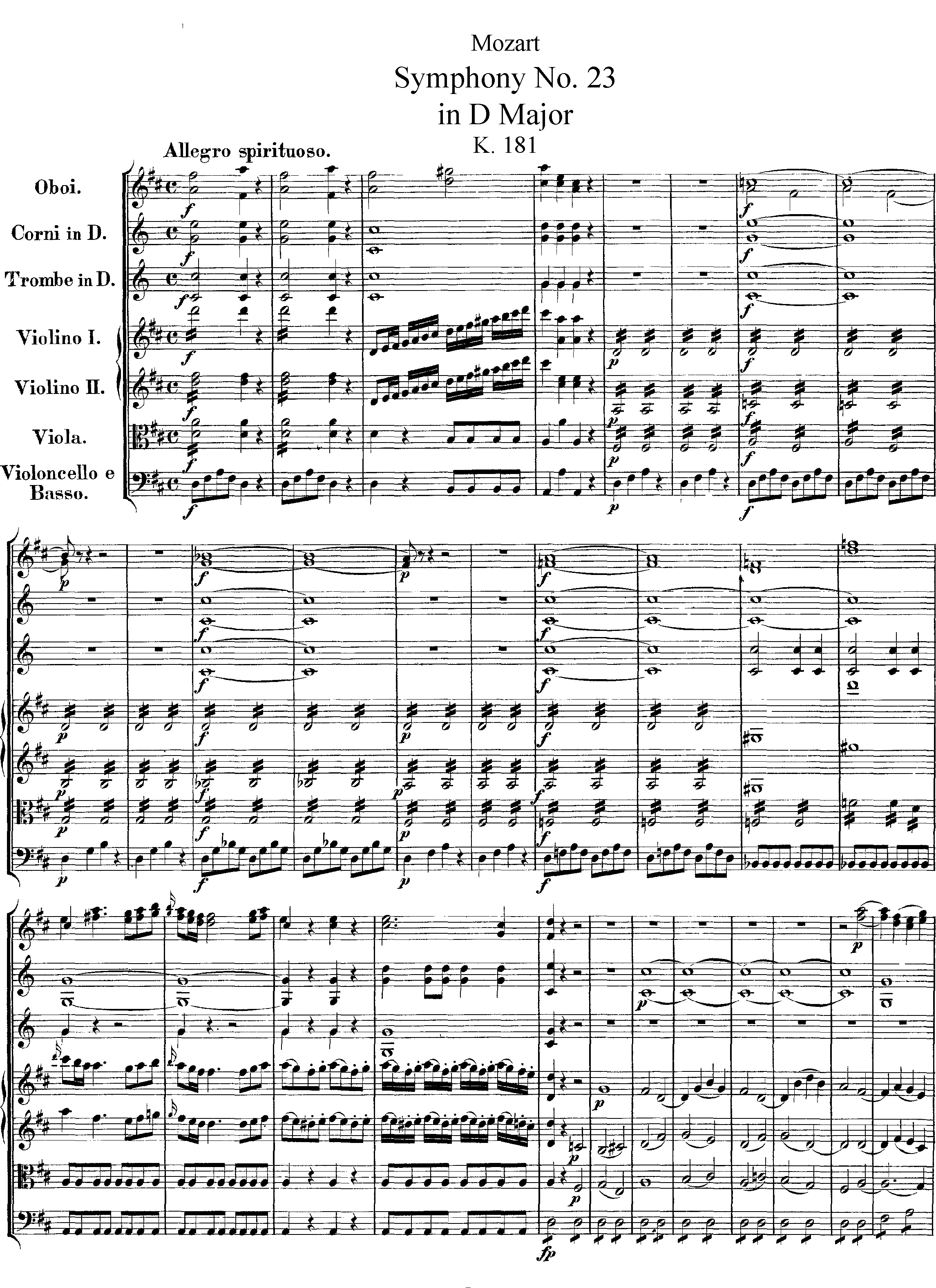
The first page of the Breitkopf & Härtel's edition (1880) of the symphony

French musicologist and Mozart scholar Georges de Saint-Foix praised the piece, making a favourable comparison against the surrounding ones in the catalogue; Symphony No. 22, K. 162 and Symphony No. 24 K. 182. British musicologist Stanley Sadie also praised the symphony as "full of brilliant writing and 'effective' passages, built up into an elegantly and logically shaped edifice".

== Recordings ==
Most recordings of the symphony are as part of complete recording projects of Mozart's symphonies.

Conductor	Orchestra	Recording Date	Formats	Labels	Catalogue ID	References
Otto Ackermann	Netherlands Philharmonic Orchestra	Unknown, released before 1988	LP / Digital	Documents records	CHS-1194	
Ferenc Fricsay	Deutsches Symphonie-Orchester Berlin	1951, released 2018	CD / Digital	Deutsche Gramophon	00028947982753	
Erich Leinsdorf	Royal Philharmonic Orchestra	1955, released 1960, rerelease 2006	LP / CD /Digital	Westminster Records / Deutsche Gramophon	XWN 18756 / 00028947758471	
Günter Kehr	Mainzer Kammerorchester	1966, rereleased on 1976 and 1991	LP / CD / Digital	Vox Records / World Record Club	SVBX 5118 / R.03331-2-3 / CDX 5030	
Karl Böhm	Berlin Philharmonic Orchestra	Released 1968, rereleased multiple times afterwards	LP / CD / Digital	Deutsche Grammophon	643 521/35	
Sir Neville Marriner	Academy of St Martin in the Fields	Released 1970, rereleased 1996	LP / CD / Digital	Philiphs Records / Decca Records	ZRG 653 / 00028945408521	
Josef Krips	Royal Concertgebouw Orchestra	1973, released 1974, rereleased 1990	CD / Digital	Philips Records / Decca Records	426 973-2 / 00028942697324	
Libor Pešek	Pardubice Chamber Philharmonic Orchestra	1977, released 2013	Digital	Supraphon	VT 9738-2	
Christopher Hogwood	The Academy of Ancient Music	1979, released same year, rereleased 1987 and 2009	LP / Cassette / CD / Digital	L'Oiseau-Lyre / Decca Records	LC 0171 / Decca 476 1718	
James Levine	Vienna Philharmonic Orchestra	1986, released 1988, rereleased in 2015	CD / Digital	Deutsche Grammophon	423 365-2 / 00289 479 4195	
Hans Graf	Mozarteum Orchestra Salzburg	1989, released 1990	CD / Digital	Capriccio Records	C10314	
Sir Charles Mackerras	Prague Chamber Orchestra	1989, released 1990	CD / Digital	Telarc Digital	CD-80217	
Nicholas Ward	Northern Chamber Orchestra	1993, released 1995 and rereleased 2013	CD / Digital	Naxos records	8.550876 / 8.501109	
Claudio Abbado	Berlin Philharmonic Orchestra	1994, released 1996, rereleased 2018	CD / Digital	Sony Classical Records	G010001222975B / 19075816312	
Trevor Pinnock	The English Concert	1992–5, released 2002	CD / Digital	Deutsche Gramophon	471 666-2	
Jaap ter Linden	Mozart Akademie Amsterdam	2001–02, released 2006 and rereleased on 2011 and 2014	CD / Digital	Brilliant Classics	92110 / 94295 / 95010	
Ádám Fischer	Danish National Chamber Orchestra	2008–09, released 2009, rereleased 2013	CD / Digital	Dacapo Records	6.220542 / 8.201201	
David Greilsammer	Orchestre de chambre de Genève	Released 2012	CD / Digital	Sonny Classical Records	88725430252	
