= 1774 in music =

== Events ==
- Antonio Salieri is appointed court composer to the Emperor Joseph II.
- Domenico Cimarosa is invited to Rome for the opera season.
- Charles Burney writes A Plan for a Music School.
- Pascal Taskin becomes keeper of the King's instruments.
- Georg Joseph Vogler becomes a pupil of Giovanni Battista Martini at Bologna.

== Opera ==
- Pasquale Anfossi – Olimpiade
- Christoph Willibald Gluck
  - Iphigenie en Aulide Wq.40
  - Orphée et Eurydice, Wq.41 (French revision of Wq. 30)
- Josef Mysliveček – Artaserse, ED.10:B.b5
- Giovanni Paisiello
  - Il duello comico, R.1.41
  - La frascatana, R.1.43
- Antonio Salieri – La Calamita de’ cuori

== Classical music ==
- Carl Friedrich Abel – 6 Keyboard Concertos, Op. 11
- Johann Christian Bach – Symphony in B-flat major, W.B 17
- Wilhelm Friedemann Bach – Keyboard Sonata in B-flat major, F.9
- Josse-François-Joseph Benaut – Mass in C major
- Ernst Eichner – 2 Harpsichord Concertos, Op. 5
- Joseph Haydn
  - Baryton Trio in D major, Hob.XI:34
  - Great Organ Mass
- Niccolò Jommelli – Pietà Signore, H.Anh.42
- Wolfgang Amadeus Mozart
  - Concertone in C major, K.190/186E
  - March in D major, K.237/189c
  - Symphony No. 29 in A
  - Symphony No. 30
- Joseph Bologne Saint-Georges
  - 2 Violin Concertos, Op. 3 (Paris: Bailleux)
  - 2 Violin Concertos, Op. 4 (Paris: Bailleux)
- Carl Stamitz
  - Concerto for Viola No. 1 in D major
  - 6 Quartets, Op. 4
- Johann Adolph Hasse – Il Ciclope

== Methods and theory writings ==
- Martin Gerbert – De cantu et musica sacra
- Johann Adam Hiller
  - Anweisung zum musikalisch-richtigen Gesange
  - Exempel-Buch der Anweisung zum Singen
- Heinrich Laag – Anfangsgründe zum Clavierspielen und Generalbas
- Georg Simon Löhlein – Anweisung zum Vionlinspielen
- Giovanni Battista Mancini – Pensieri e riflessioni pratiche sopra il canto figurato
- Giovanni Battista Martini – Esemplare, o sia Saggio fondamentale pratico di contrappunto
- Johann Friedrich Reichardt – Briefe eines aufmerksamen Reisenden die Musik betreffend

== Births ==
- February 16 – Pierre Rode, violinist, composer, (d. 1830)
- March 5 – Christoph Ernst Friedrich Weyse, composer
- April 17 – Václav Jan Křtitel Tomášek, organist and composer
- October 7 – Ferdinando Orlandi, composer
- October 23 – René de Chazet, librettist and writer (died 1844)
- November 14 – Gaspare Spontini, composer (died 1851)
- November 18 – William Horsley, composer
- December 20 – Guillaume-Perre-Antoine Gatayes, composer

== Deaths ==
- January 20 – Florian Leopold Gassmann, composer, 44
- January 30
  - Jean-Pierre Guignon, French composer (born 1702)
  - Frantisek Tuma, composer, 69
- July 1 (buried) – Wenceslaus Wodiczka, violinist and composer
- July 7 – Giuseppi Maria Carretti, composer
- August 25 – Niccolò Jommelli, composer, 59
- December 2 – Johann Friedrich Agricola, composer, 54
