= Symphony No. 27 (Mozart) =

1773 symphony by W. A. Mozart

- by W. A. Mozart
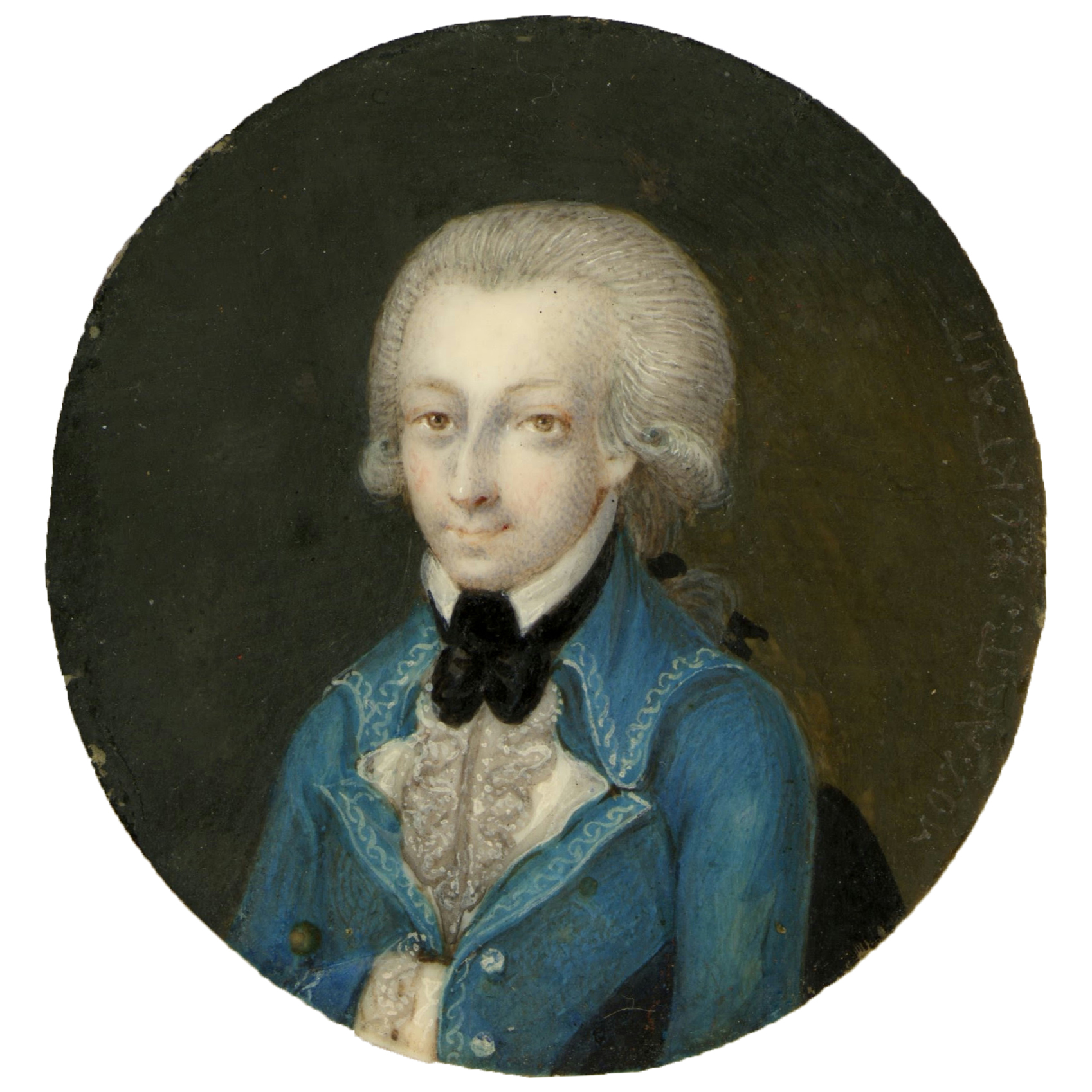
- Mozart in 1773, portrait by Martin Knoller
- Key: G major
- Catalogue: K. 199/161b
- Composed: April 1773
- Duration: c. 16 minutes
- Movements: 3
- Scoring: Orchestra

Symphony No. 27 in G major, K. 199/161b, is a symphony composed by Wolfgang Amadeus Mozart in April 1773. The symphony is scored for 2 flutes; 2 horns in G, in D for the second movement; and strings.

This symphony is in three movements:

1. Allegro, 3/4
2. Andantino grazioso, 2/4 (D major)
3. Presto, 3/8
