= Symphony No. 29 (Mozart) =

1774 symphony by W. A. Mozart

- by W. A. Mozart
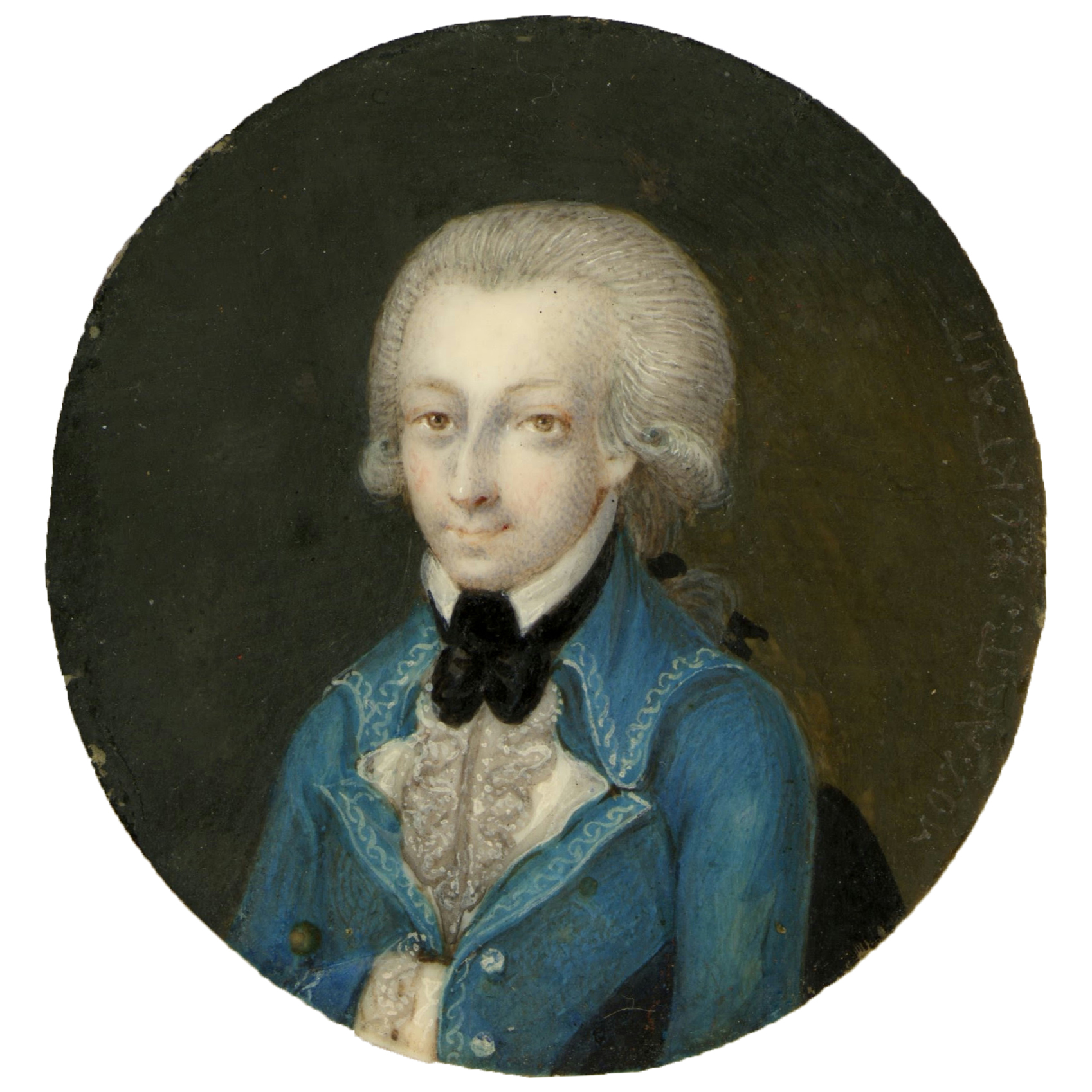
- Mozart in 1773, portrait by Martin Knoller
- Key: A major
- Catalogue: K. 201/186a
- Composed: 6 April 1774
- Duration: c. 27 minutes
- Movements: 4
- Scoring: Orchestra

I. Allegro moderato

II. Andante

III. Menuetto

IV. Allegro con spirito
Performed by the Tsumugi Orchestra

The Symphony No. 29 in A major, K. 201/186a, was completed by Wolfgang Amadeus Mozart on 6 April 1774. It is, along with Symphony No. 25, one of his better known early symphonies. Stanley Sadie characterizes it as "a landmark ... personal in tone, indeed perhaps more individual in its combination of an intimate, chamber music style with a still fiery and impulsive manner."

== Structure ==
Typical of early-period Mozart symphonies, the work is scored for 2 oboes; 2 horns in A, and in D for the second movement; and strings, as was typical of early-period Mozart symphonies.

There are four movements:

1. Allegro moderato, 2/2
2. Andante, 2/4 in D major
3. Menuetto: Allegretto – Trio (Trio in E major), 3/4
4. Allegro con spirito, 6/8

The first movement is in sonata form, with a graceful principal theme characterized by an octave drop and ambitious horn passages. The second movement is scored for muted strings with limited use of the winds, and is also in sonata form. The third movement, a minuet, is characterized by nervous dotted rhythms and staccato phrases; the trio provides a more graceful contrast. The energetic last movement, another sonata-form movement in 6/8 time, connects back to the first movement with its octave drop in the main theme.
