= Symphony No. 24 (Mozart) =

1773 symphony by W. A. Mozart

- by W. A. Mozart
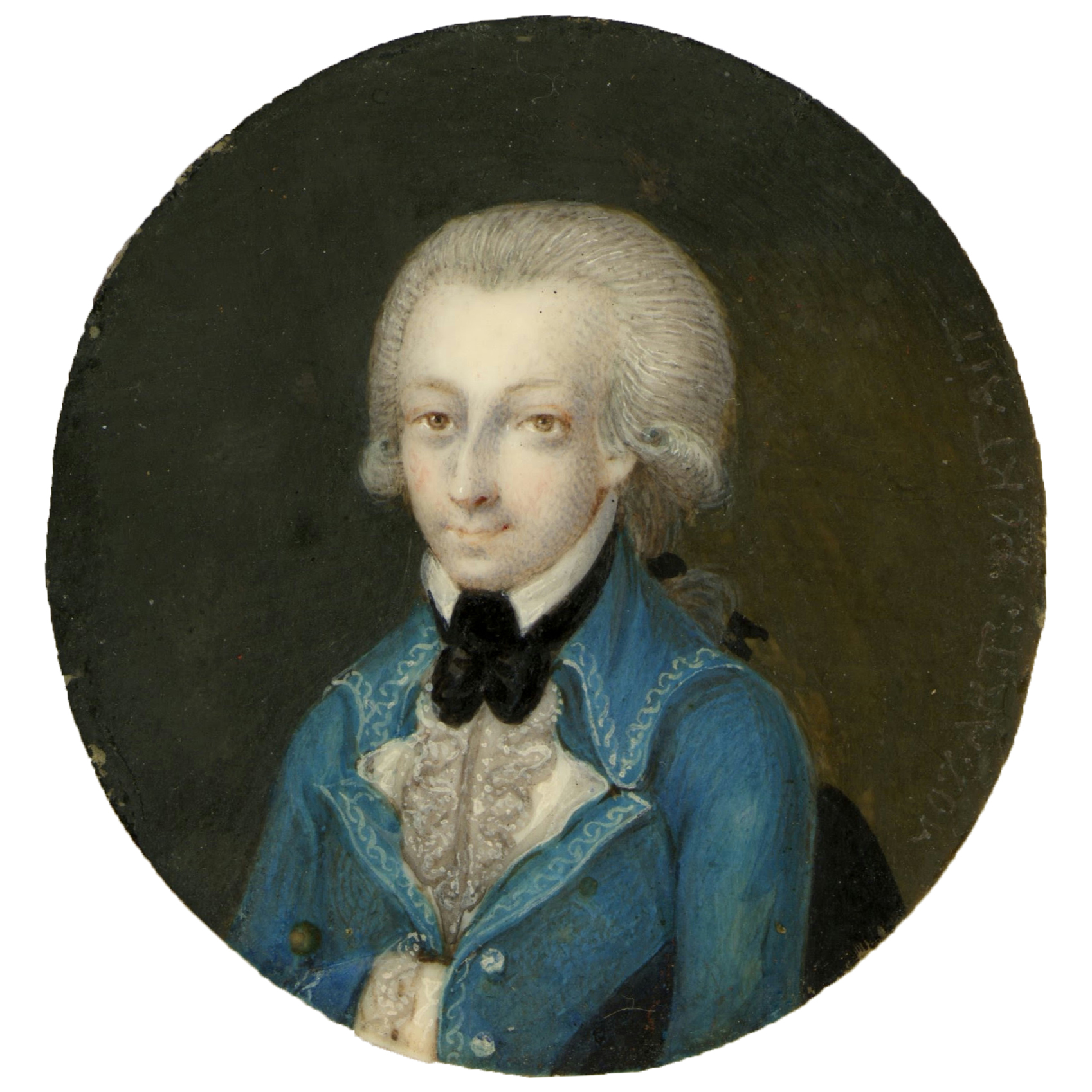
- Mozart in 1773, portrait by Martin Knoller
- Key: B♭ major
- Catalogue: K. 182/173dA
- Composed: October 1773
- Duration: c. 10 minutes
- Movements: 3
- Scoring: Orchestra

Symphony No. 24 in B♭ major, K. 182/173dA, is a symphony composed by Wolfgang Amadeus Mozart, completed in Salzburg on 3 October 1773. The symphony is scored for two oboes (replaced by two flutes in the slow movement), two horns in B♭, and E♭ for the second movement, and strings.

He wrote the symphony in three movements:

1. Allegro spiritoso, 4/4
2. Andantino grazioso, 2/4
3. Allegro, 3/8

The autograph score is today located in the Staatsbibliothek zu Berlin Preußischer Kulturbesitz.
