= Symphony No. 26 (Mozart) =

1773 composition by W. A. Mozart

- by W. A. Mozart
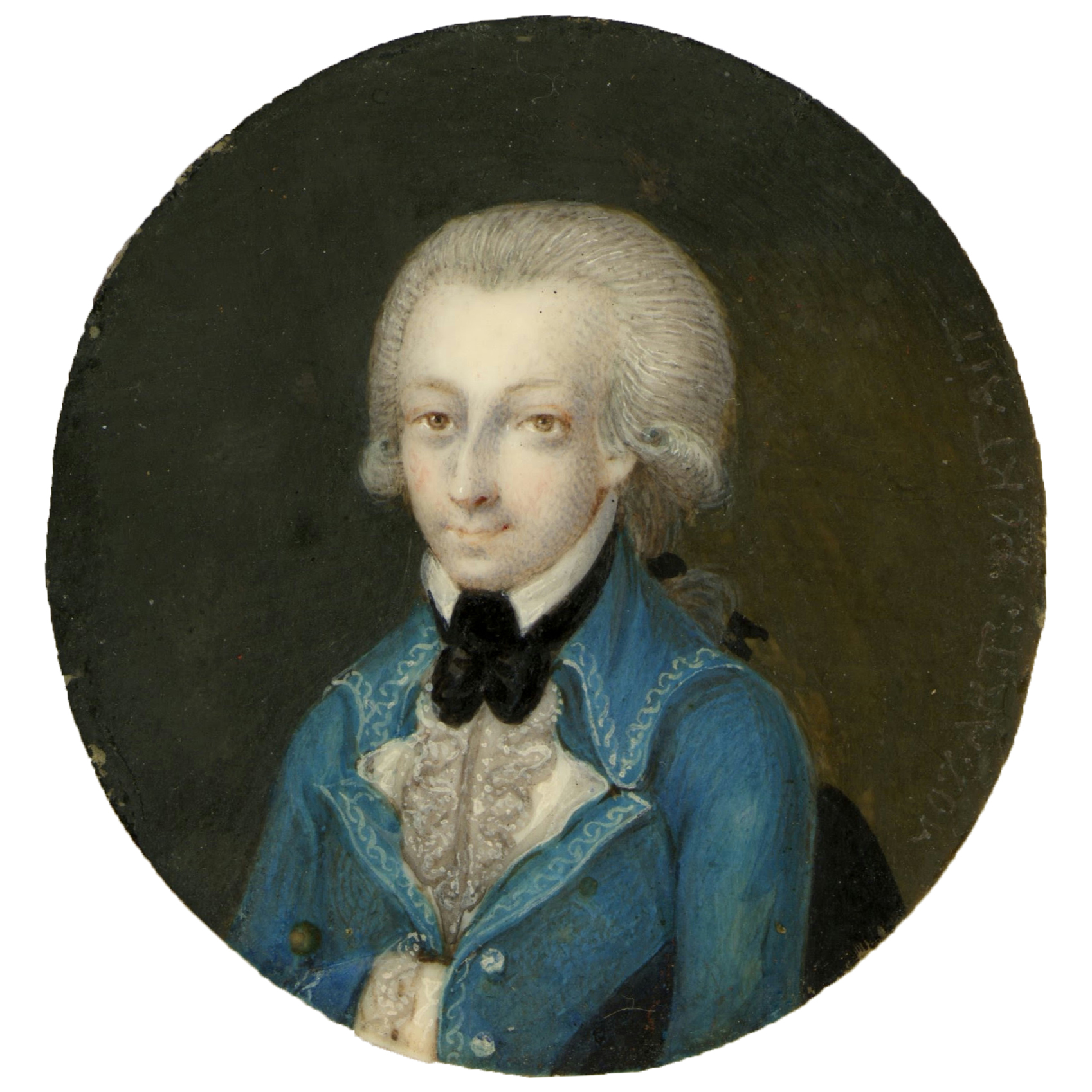
- Mozart in 1773, portrait by Martin Knoller
- Key: E♭ major
- Catalogue: K. 184
- Composed: March 1773
- Duration: c. 9 minutes
- Movements: 3
- Scoring: Orchestra

The Symphony No. 26 in E♭ major, K. 184/161a, was written by Wolfgang Amadeus Mozart and completed on 30 March 1773, one month after he returned from his third Italian tour.

The symphony is scored for two flutes, two oboes, two bassoons, two horns, two trumpets and strings.

The symphony has three movements:

1. Molto presto, 4/4
2. Andante in C minor, 2/4
3. Allegro, 3/8
