= Wenceslaus Wodiczka =

Wenceslaus Wodiczka, also known as Václav Vodička (c. 1715-1774), was a Bohemian composer who worked at the courts of the Bavarian Prince-Electors Karl Albrecht and Maximilian III Joseph.

== Life ==
Born into feudal bondage, he was claimed to have purchased his freedom from the Count von Wieznik with a team of horses. In 1732 he began his service at the court of Bavaria, initially as a violinist. In 1746 he married the soprano Maria Johann Brentani (c. 1715 - 1781); their daughter Walburga (b. 1749) became a professional singer at the court opera. In 1747 Wodiczka was appointed Konzertmeister and also a state councillor. He was active as a teacher and composer, and was acquainted with the Mozart family. He died in Munich in 1774, where he was buried on 1 July.

== Works ==
Wodiczka published his op. 1, a set of six violin sonatas, in Paris in 1739. He wrote 48 symphonies for the court church in Munich, of which 24 are lost. He also wrote a violin method, published in Amsterdam in 1757. His set of eight sonatas, op.2 (1742) for violin includes four which may be played on the flute. His other works include two concertos for the flute and one for the violin.

== See also ==
Free scores by Wenceslaus Wodiczka at the International Music Score Library Project (IMSLP)
