= Symphony No. 30 (Mozart) =

1774 symphony by W. A. Mozart

- by W. A. Mozart
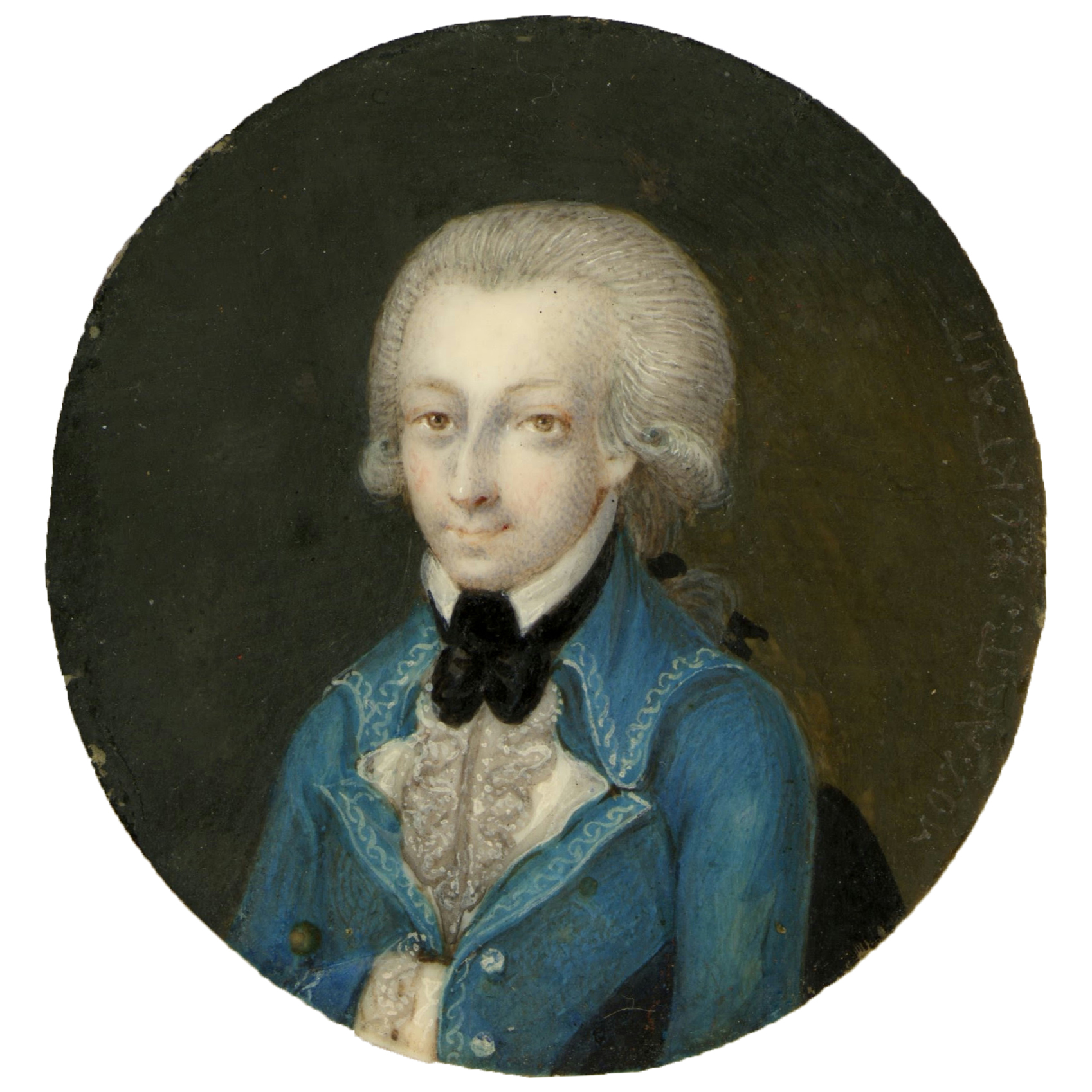
- Mozart in 1773, portrait by Martin Knoller
- Key: D major
- Catalogue: K. 202/186b
- Composed: Salzburg, May 1774
- Duration: c. 17 minutes
- Movements: 4
- Scoring: Orchestra

Wolfgang Amadeus Mozart wrote Symphony No. 30 in D major, K. 202/186b in Salzburg, completing it on 5 May 1774.

The work is scored for two oboes, two horns and two trumpets in D (silent in the Andantino and Trio), timpani and strings, but the timpani part has been lost. There has been at least one attempt to reconstruct the timpani part.

The work is in four movements:

1. Molto allegro, 3/4
2. Andantino con moto (A major), 2/4
3. Menuetto and Trio (the latter in G major), 3/4
4. Presto, 2/4

The first movement is in sonata form and opens with a falling, dotted fanfare motif. A transitional section follows which contains a dialogue between violins and bass alternating between loud and soft dynamics and ending with a trill. The second theme a group of the sonata-form structure contains two sections. The first is a ländler scored for two violins against bass while the second is a minuet for the tutti featuring trills on almost every beat. The expositional coda returns to the ländler style. The development focuses on the minuet style with the phrase-lengths elongated. Following the recapitulation, the movement coda returns to this minuet and regularizes its phrase lengths before the final cadence.

In the trio of the minuet, the first violin is syncopated an eighth note ahead of the accompaniment.

The finale starts with a falling dotted fanfare motif similar to the one that starts the opening movement. The answering phrase and the movement's second theme have a contradanse character.
