= Symphony No. 22 (Mozart) =

1773 composition by W. A. Mozart

- by W. A. Mozart
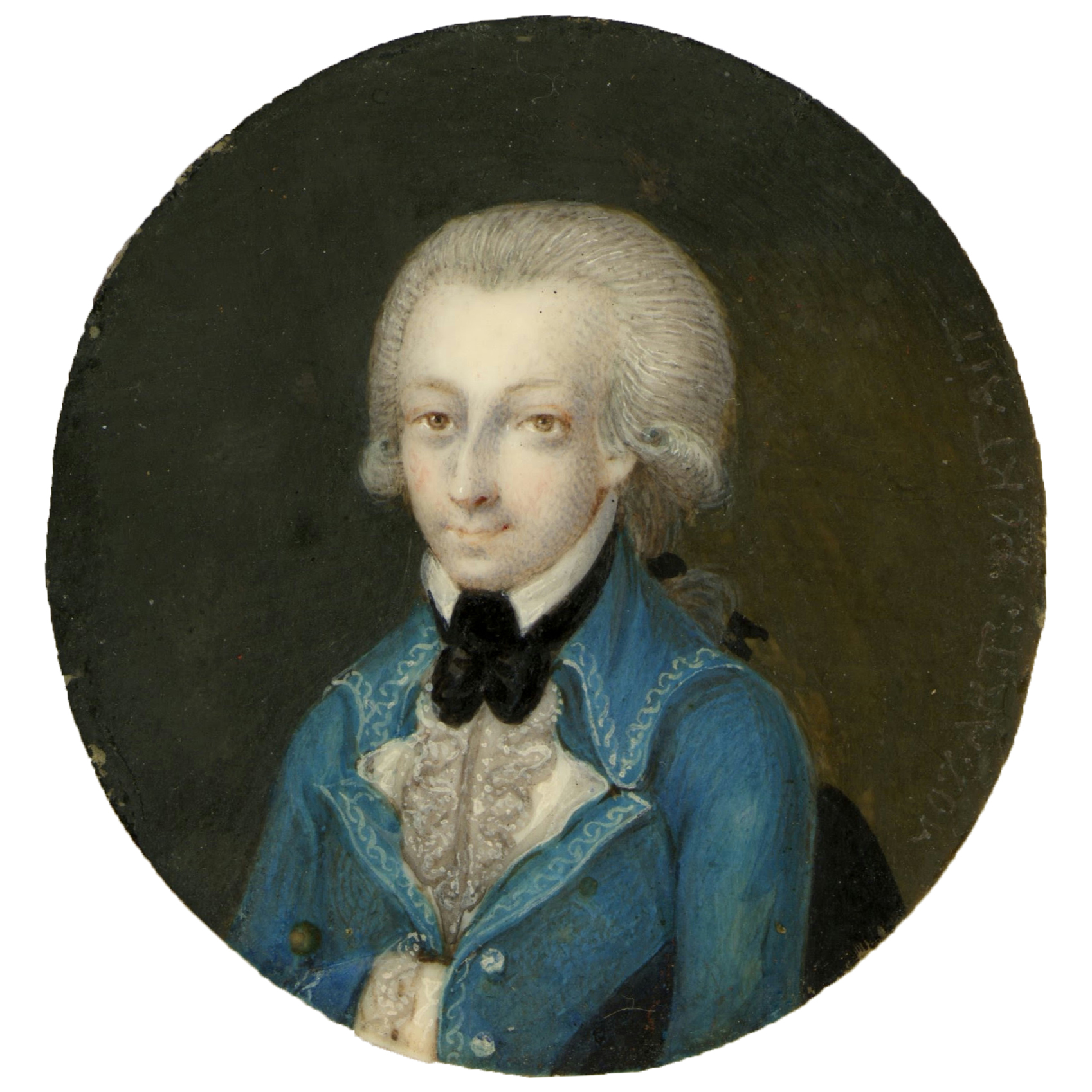
- Mozart in 1773, portrait by Martin Knoller
- Key: A major
- Catalogue: K. 162
- Composed: April 1773
- Duration: c. 8 minutes
- Movements: 3
- Scoring: Orchestra

Symphony No. 22 in C major, K. 162, is a symphony composed by Wolfgang Amadeus Mozart in April 1773 at the age of seventeen. The symphony has the scoring of two oboes, two horns in C, two trumpets in C (in first and third movements), and strings.

The symphony consists of three movements:

1. Allegro assai, 4/4
2. Andantino grazioso, 2/4 in F major
3. Presto assai, 6/8
