= Martin Knoller =

Austrian-Italian painter (1725–1804)

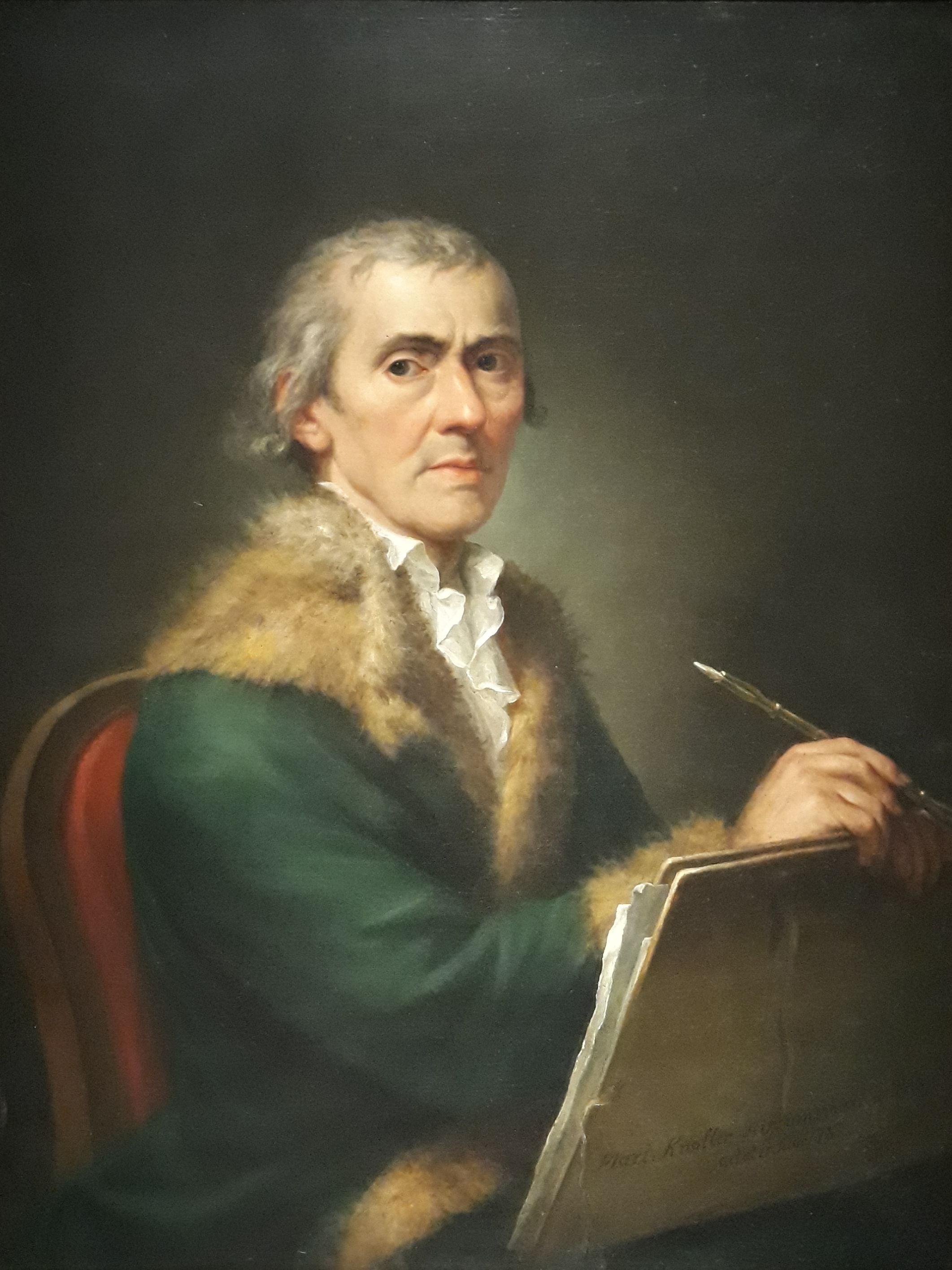
- Self-portrait of Martin Knoller (Pinacoteca di Brera)
- Born: 18 December 1725; Steinach am Brenner, Austria
- Died: 24 July 1804 (aged 78); Milan, Italia
- Occupation: Painter
- Movement: Neoclassicism

Martin Knoller (18 November 1725 – 24 July 1804) was an Austrian-Italian painter active in Italy who is remembered for his fresco work. His works cover both Baroque and Rococo, the latter prevailing in his paintings rather than in his frescoes. His greatest patron was Karl Joseph von Firmian, the Imperial Governor of Lombardy under Maria Theresa who commissioned him to paint the Palazzo Firmian-Vigoni.

== Biography ==
=== Early career ===
Born in Steinach am Brenner near the Austrian city of Innsbruck, Knoller was first taught by his father, Franz Knoller, and the Innsbruck painter Ignaz Pögl. He studied from 1751 to 1753 at the Vienna Akademie under Paul Troger and Michelangelo Unterberger. Their influence shows in his first commission (1754), a fresco of the Glory of St. Stephen for the parish church of Anras in East Tyrol.

In 1755 Knoller travelled to Rome and Naples to further his training. There he came into contact with Graf Karl Joseph von Firmian who, as Imperial Governor of Lombardy, entrusted Knoller with decorating the Palazzo Firmian-Vigoni in Milan. Between 1760 and 1765 Knoller was again in Rome, where the works of Pompeo Batoni, Anton Raphael Mengs and Anton von Maron had a decisive impact on him. These Neoclassical influences show in his Martyrdom of St. Catherine (1763) and Martyrdom of St. Sebastian (1765) at the Klosterkirche at Ettal and the altarpiece in the Karlskirche at Volders, St. Charles Borromeo among Plague Victims (1769).

=== Maturity ===
After his appointment as court painter to Firmian in 1765, Knoller based himself in Milan and began his most productive period. In 1766 he frescoed the interior of the Karlskirche at Volders, in 1769 the cupola of the choir at Ettal, from 1770 to 1775 the seven cupolas of Neresheim Abbey, in 1771–72 the ceiling of the monastery church at Gries, near Bolzano, and in 1773–74 the Bürgersaalkirche in Munich.

In the following years he decorated many palaces in Milan, executing ceiling frescoes and oil paintings (c. 1776–77) in the Royal Palace and the Palazzo Greppi and three frescoes in 1782–83 for the Palazzo Belgioioso. Notable among his secular decorations in the Tyrol are the fresco (1785–86) in the Palais Fugger–Taxis in Innsbruck and the ceiling fresco (c. 1800) in the Palazzo Gerstburg in Bolzano. Knoller also presented his home town with three altar paintings, St. Erasmus (1772), St. Sebastian (1783) and the Beheading of John the Baptist (1794; all Steinach am Brenner, St. Erasmus), which he had painted in Milan.

From 1790 to 1794 Knoller lived in Vienna, and on submission of a St. Sebastian in 1791 he was made a member of the Akademie. Wenzel Anton, Prince of Kaunitz-Rietberg obtained many commissions for him in Vienna, mainly for portraits and landscapes. In 1794 Knoller returned to Milan, where he worked as a professor of colouring at the Brera Academy until 1803. There are altarpieces from this late period in the Deutschordenskirche, Bolzano, the Servitenkirche in Innsbruck, and the Klosterkirche, Benediktbeuren, and six particularly remarkable examples at the Gries Klosterkirche, near Bolzano.

Knoller’s painting of altarpieces and frescoes is the outcome of a debate between Baroque and classical ideas. Generally, he attempted a synthesis, with the classical aspect evident in the drawing and composition, and the Baroque in the warm, powerful colouring. In the religious ceiling frescoes, with their many figures, Troger’s teaching is still uppermost.

=== Later works ===
The later religious works, however, are increasingly eclectic, drawing on the Carracci and Antonio da Correggio. As his fresco-painting activity declined, Knoller devoted himself more to painting altarpieces and portraits. Mengs was a decisive influence on his portraiture. Few of his c. 70 documented portraits are known; they include some self-portraits (1758, Innsbruck, Tirol. Landesmus.; 1773, Milan, Brera). Knoller’s landscape painting remains in the tradition of Claude Lorrain and Nicolas Poussin. Knoller died in Milan on 24 July 1804. Among his pupils was Giuseppe Mazzola.

== Works ==
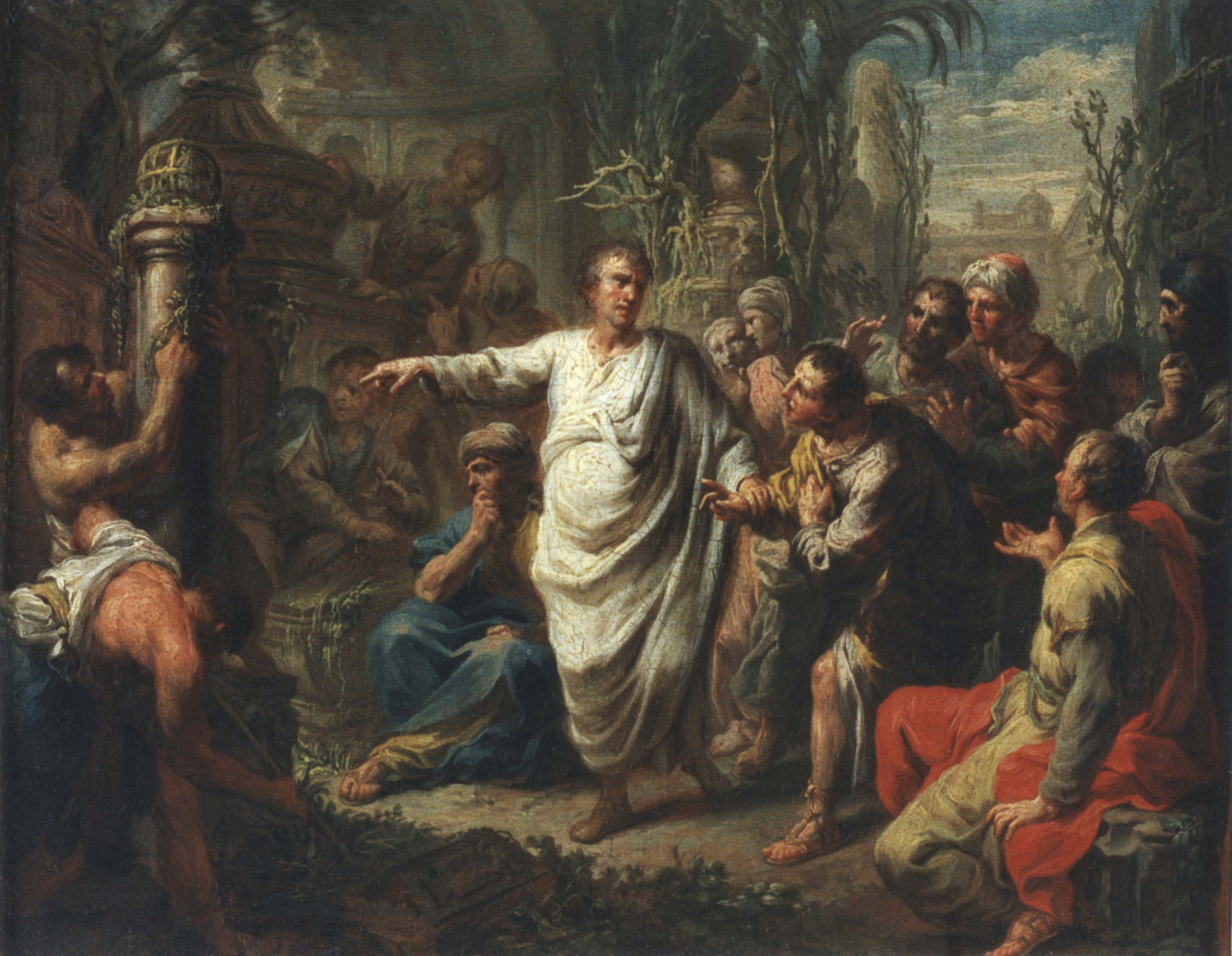
Cicero discovering the tomb of Archimedes, private collection

Frescoes:

- Anras Church, East Tyrol (1754)
- Karlskirche, Volders near Innsbruck (1765)
- Ettal Abbey near Oberammergau (1769)
- Neresheim Abbey (1770–1775)
- Gries bei Bozen Abbey (1772–1775)
- Palazzo Belgioioso, Milan (1781)
- Taxis Palais, Innsbruck (1785–1786)

Altarpieces:

- Karlkirche, Volders
- Servitenkirche, Innsbruck
- Parish church of Steinach am Brenner
- St George and the Dragon, Deutschhauskirche, Bolzano
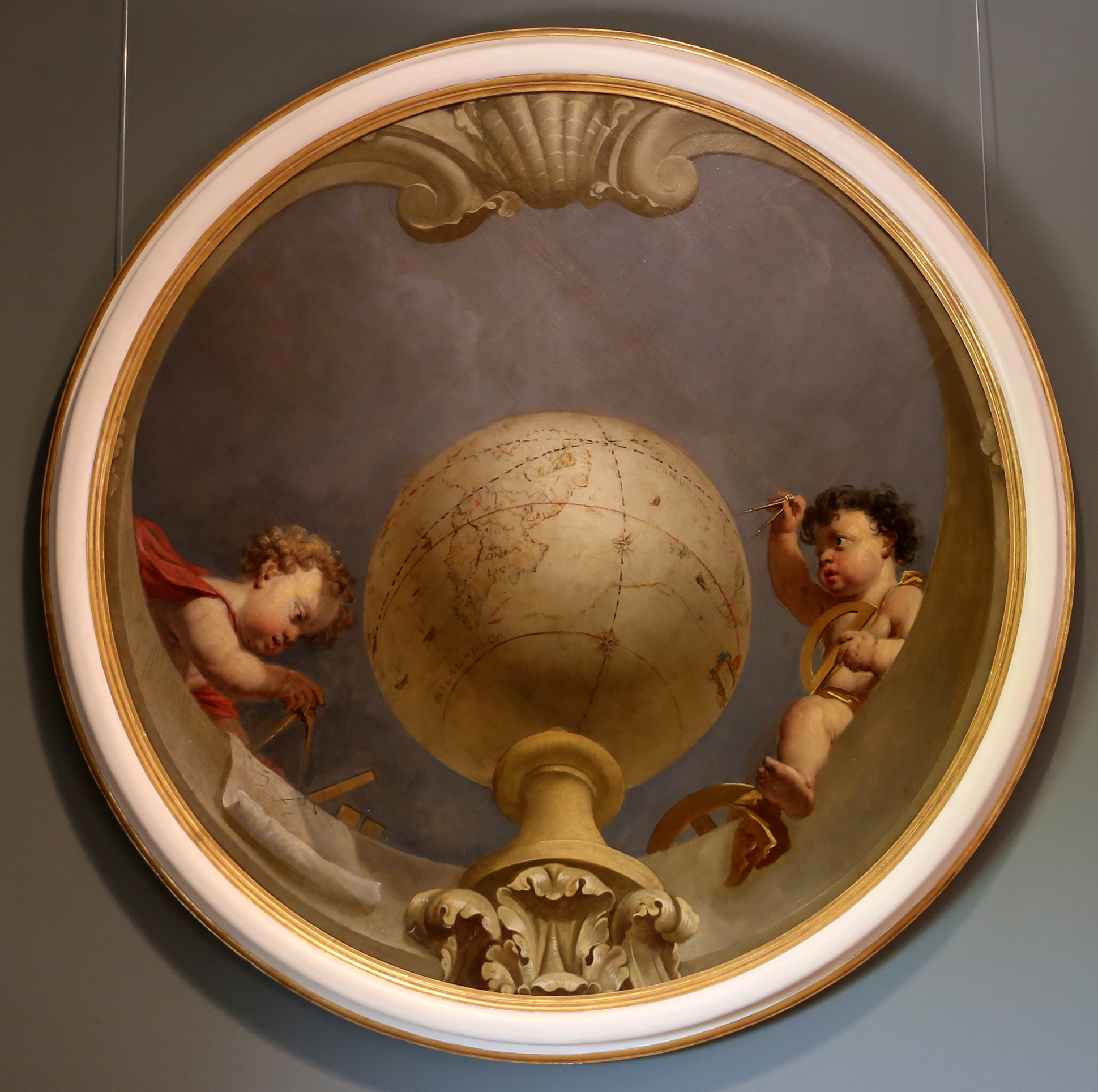
Allegoria delle arti liberali, architettura e astronomia

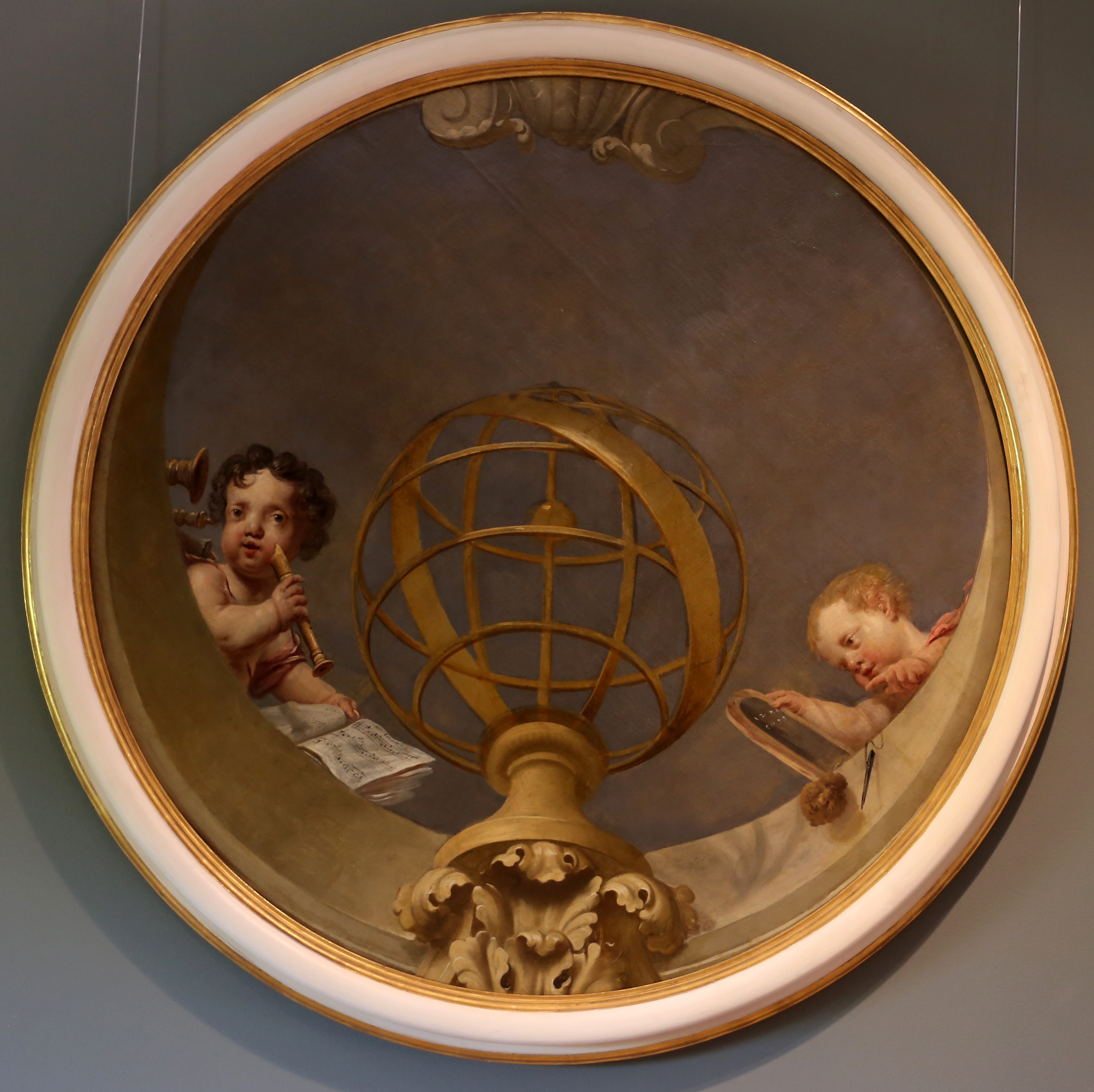
Allegoria delle arti liberali, musica e aritmetica

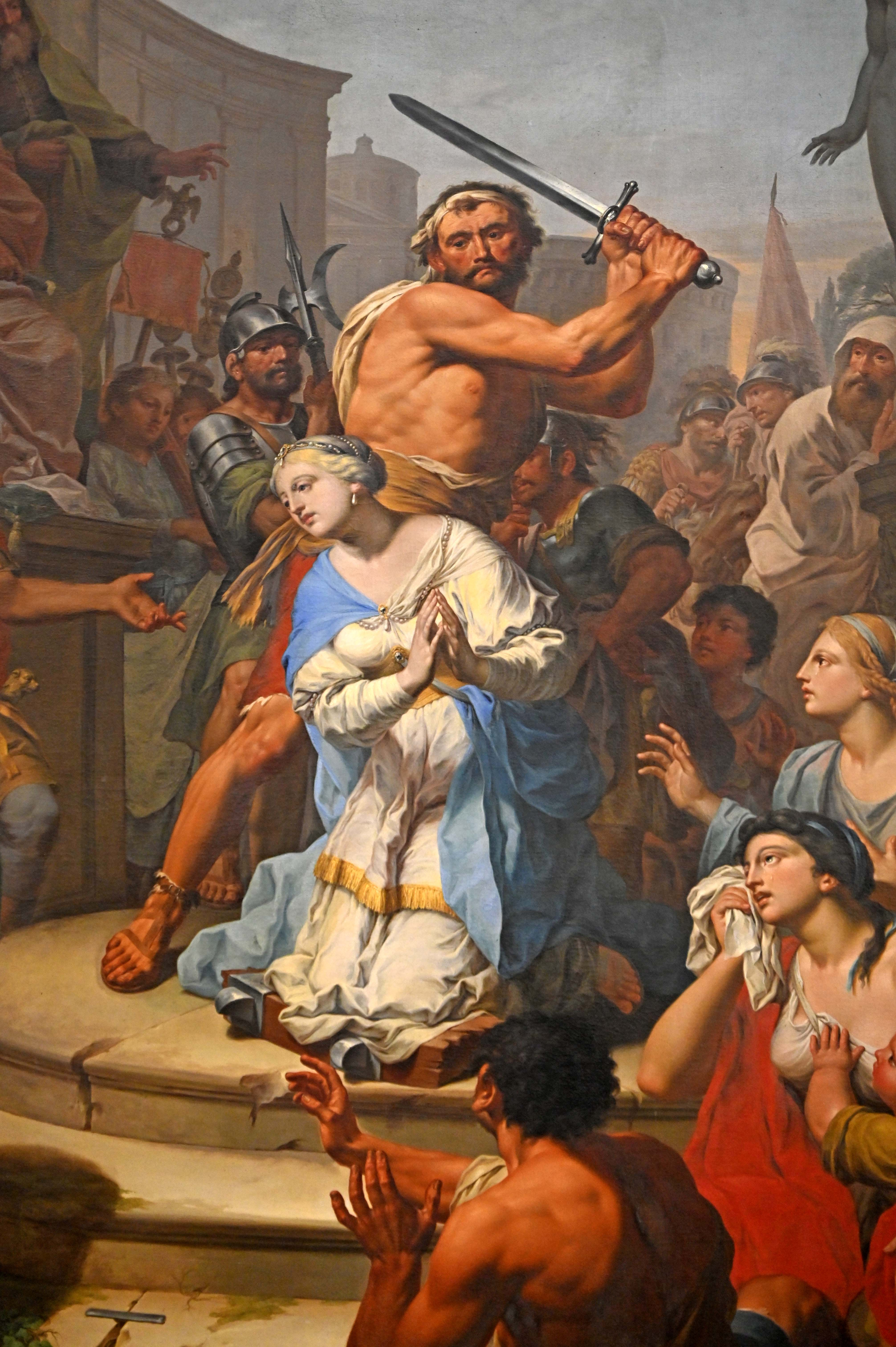
The beheading of Saint Catherine, Kloster Ettal, St. Mariä Himmelfahrt

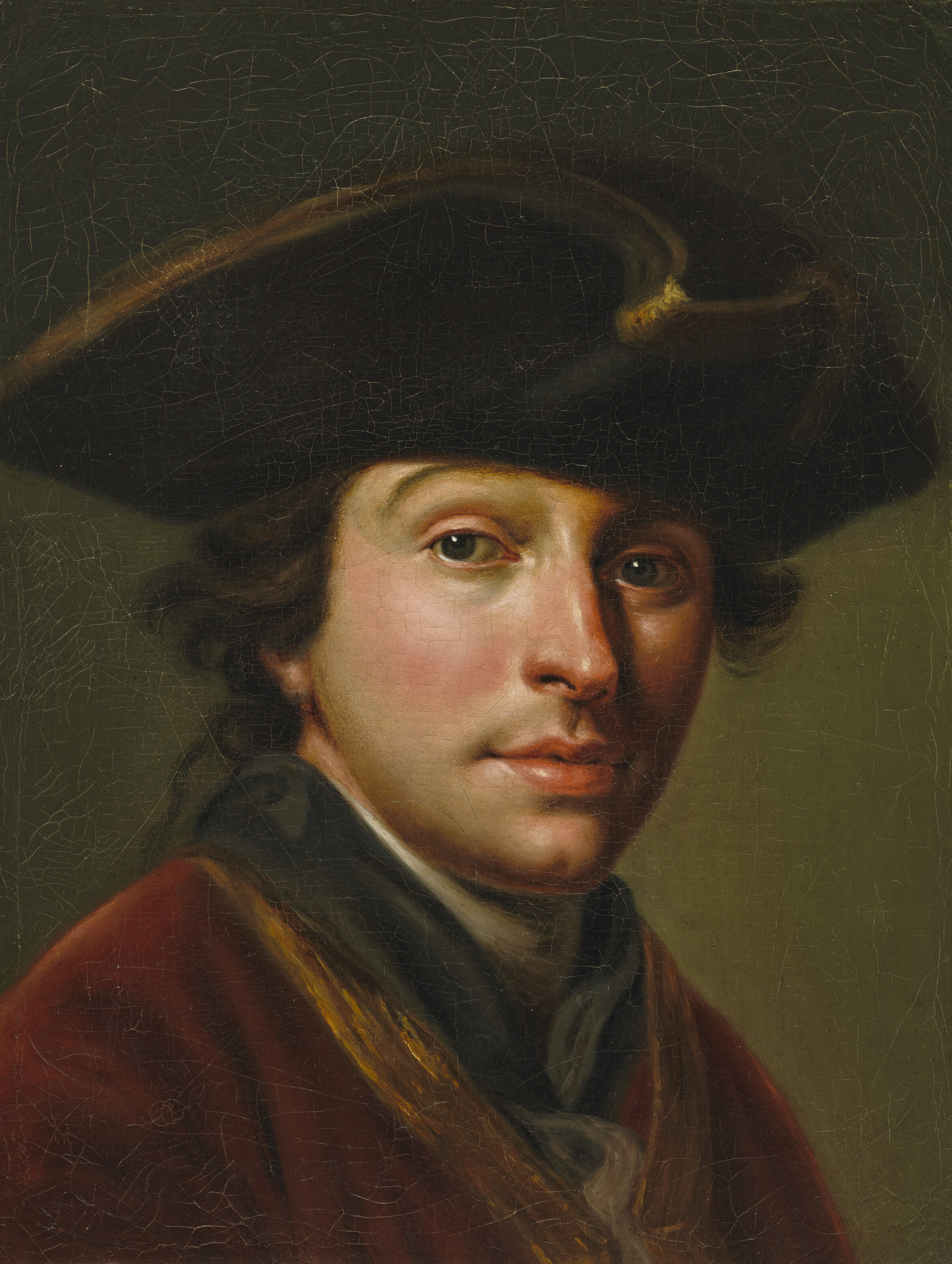
Portrait of Anton van Maron

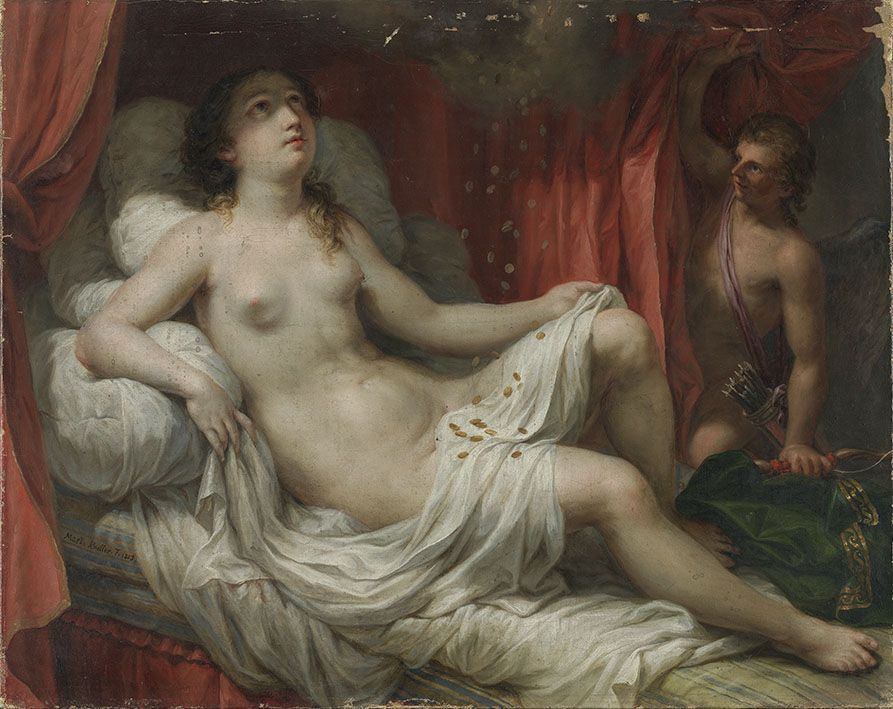
Danae, Bavarian State Painting Collections

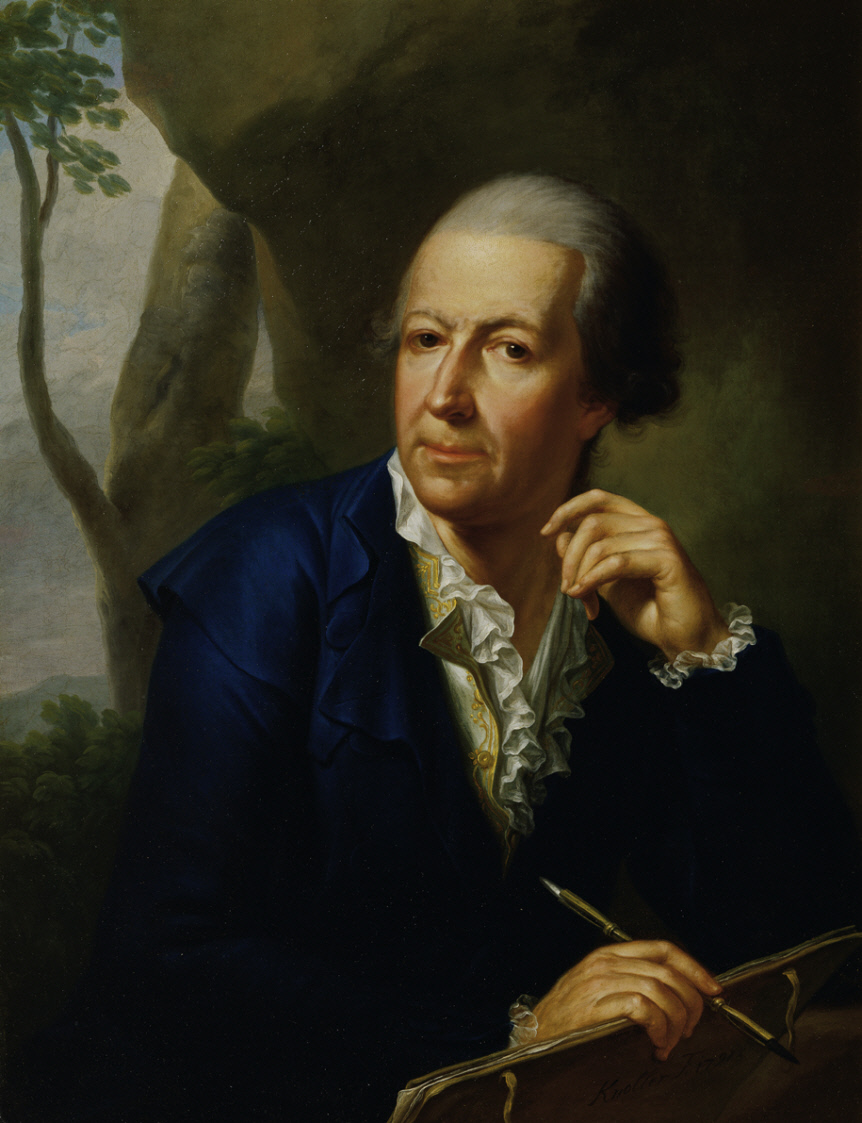
Portrait of Joseph Rosa

== Bibliography ==
- Karl Weiß, Knoller, Martin. In: Allgemeine Deutsche Biographie (ADB). Vol 16, Duncker & Humblot, Leipzig 1882, p. 321–323. (in German)
- Hanns-Paul Ties, Paul Troger, seine Schüler, seine Zeit. Neufunde und Neuzuschreibungen zur Tiroler Barockmalerei, in: Der Schlern, Zeitschrift für Südtiroler Landeskunde, 86, No. 7/8 2012, p. 143 et seq. (in German)
