= Whom the Gods Love (1942 film) =

- Directed by: Karl Hartl
- Written by: Richard Billinger (novel); E. Strzygowski (novel); Eduard von Borsody
- Produced by: Karl Hartl
- Starring: Hans Holt; Irene von Meyendorff; Winnie Markus; Paul Hörbiger
- Cinematography: Günther Anders
- Edited by: Henny Brünsch; Karl Hartl
- Production company: Wien-Film
- Distributed by: UFA
- Release date: 5 December 1942
- Running time: 111 minutes
- Country: Austria (Part of Greater Germany)
- Language: German

Whom the Gods Love (German: Wen die Götter lieben) is a 1942 Austrian historical musical film directed by Karl Hartl and starring Hans Holt, Irene von Meyendorff, and Winnie Markus. The film is a biopic of the Austrian composer Wolfgang Amadeus Mozart. It was made as a co-production between the giant German studio UFA and Wien-Film which had been set up following the German annexation of Austria. The film was part of a wider attempt by the Nazis to portray Mozart as an authentic German hero. Like many German biopics of the war years, it portrays the composer as a pioneering visionary.

The title refers to Mozart's middle name Amadeus (Latin for "love God") and to the aphorism "he whom the gods love, dies young" (Latin: "quem di diligunt, adolescens moritur") from Plautus' Bacchides, lines 816–17, and earlier Greek sources, including Homer's mention of Trophonius; Mozart died at the age of 35.

A British film of the same title (also about Mozart) had been released in 1936.

== Cast ==
- Hans Holt as Wolfgang Amadeus Mozart
- Irene von Meyendorff as Luisa Weber Langer
- Winnie Markus as Konstanze Weber Mozart
- Paul Hörbiger as Von Strack
- Walter Janssen as Leopold Mozart
- Rosa Albach-Retty as Frau Mozart
- Annie Rosar as Frau Weber
- René Deltgen as Ludwig van Beethoven
- Thea Weis as Sophie Weber
- Susi Witt as Josepha Weber
- Curd Jürgens as Emperor Joseph II
- Hans Siebert as Duke of Mannheim
- Richard Eybner as Baron von Gemmingen
- Fritz Imhoff as Albrechtsberger
- Karl Blühm as Hoeffer
- Erich Nikowitz as Süssmayr
- Doris Hild
- Georg Lorenz
- Pepi Glöckner-Kramer
- Franz Herterich
- Otto Schmöle
- Theodor Danegger
- Alfred Neugebauer
- Ferdinand Mayerhofer
- Willi Hufnagel
- Hermann Erhardt
- Louise Kartousch
- Erna Berger as Singer
- Siegmund Roth as Singer
- Karl Schmitt-Walter as Singer
- Dagmar Söderquist as Singer

== See also ==
- The Mozart Story (re-edited version for the USA, 1948)

== Bibliography ==
- Hake, Sabine. Popular Cinema of the Third Reich. University of Texas Press, 2001.
