= Karl Thomas Mozart =

Eldest surviving son of Wolfgang Amadeus Mozart

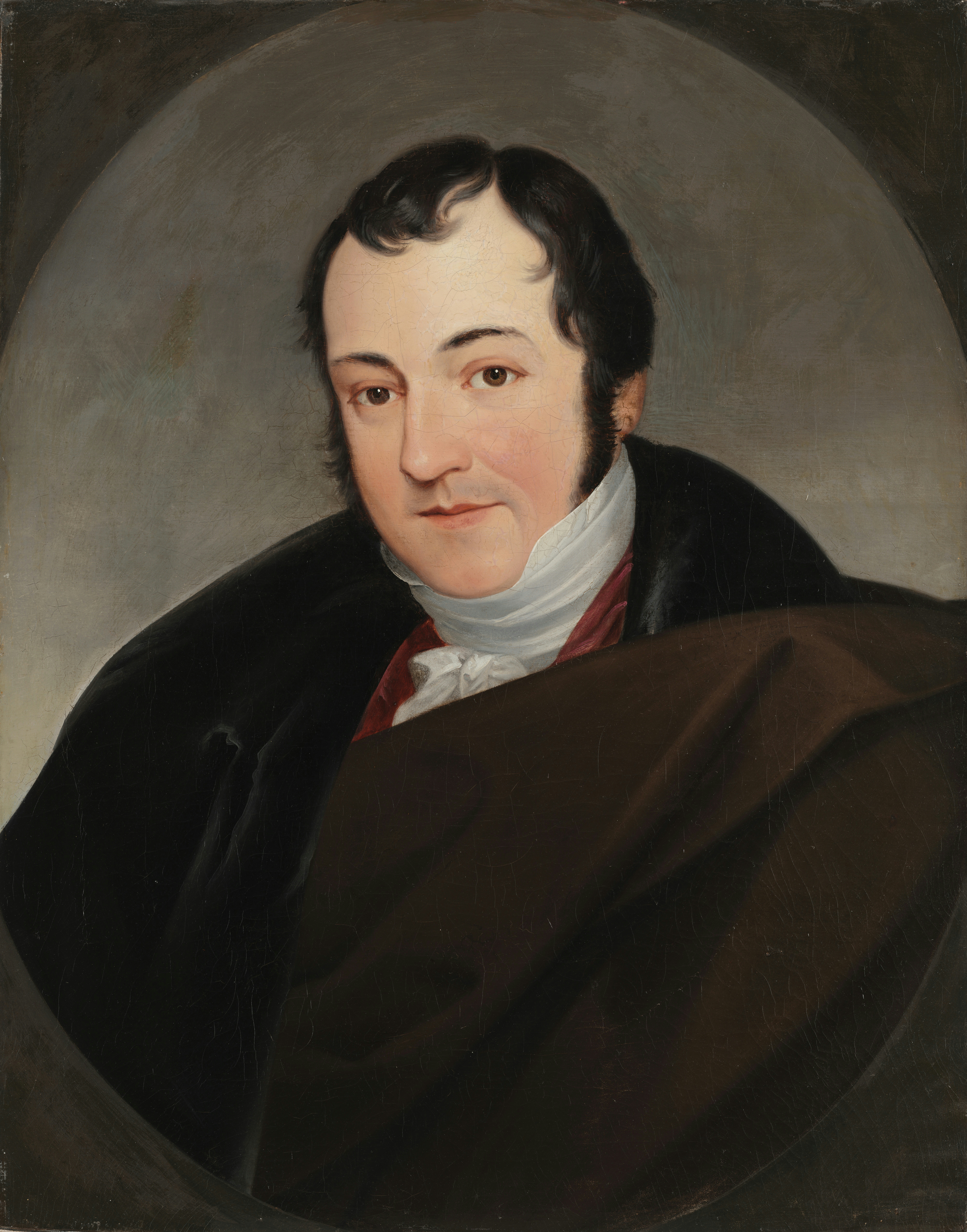
- Portrait of Mozart, 1840
- Born: 21 September 1784; Vienna, Archduchy of Austria, Holy Roman Empire
- Died: 31 October 1858 (aged 74); Milan, Kingdom of Lombardy–Venetia, Austrian Empire
- Parent(s): Wolfgang Amadeus Mozart; Constanze Weber
- Relatives: Franz Xaver Wolfgang Mozart (brother); Leopold Mozart (paternal grandfather); Cäcilia Weber (maternal grandmother); Josepha, Aloysia, and Sophie Weber (maternal aunts)
- Family: Mozart

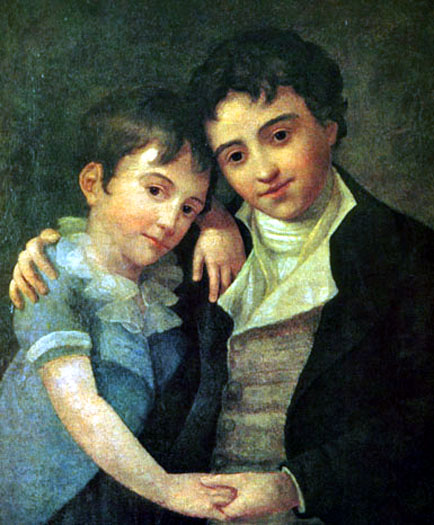
The two surviving sons of Wolfgang Amadeus and Constanze Mozart: Franz Xaver Wolfgang Mozart (left) and Karl Thomas (right) (by Hans Hansen, Vienna, 1800)

Karl Thomas Mozart (Note: His name was also spelt as Karlus, Carl or Carlus.) (21 September 1784 – 31 October 1858) was an Austrian musician. He was the second son and, along with his brother, one of the two surviving children of Wolfgang and Constanze Mozart. The other was Franz Xaver Wolfgang Mozart.

== Biography ==
Karl was born in Vienna. His schooling, in Prague, was under Franz Xaver Niemetschek and František Xaver Dušek, and he became a gifted pianist. Before he finished his schooling, however, he left for Livorno in 1797 to begin his apprenticeship with a trading firm.

He planned to open a piano store in the following years, but the project failed for lack of funds. He moved to Milan in 1805 and studied music with Bonifazio Asioli, though he gave up his studies in 1810 to become an official in the service of the Austrian financial administration and the governmental accounting department in Milan. He also served as official translator for Italian for the Austrian Court Chamber. He owned a house in the village of Caversaccio in Valmorea, Province of Como not far from Lake Como and Lake Lugano; he appreciated the amenities of the place and the wholesomeness of the water. He bequeathed the house to the town, which is stated on a plaque dedicated to him. The Town Hall keeps a copy of the will.

He also frequently attended events related to his father until his death in Milan in 1858. Like his brother, he was unmarried and childless; thus the Mozart family line died with him.
