= Der Tyroler Wastel =

1796 German-language comic opera

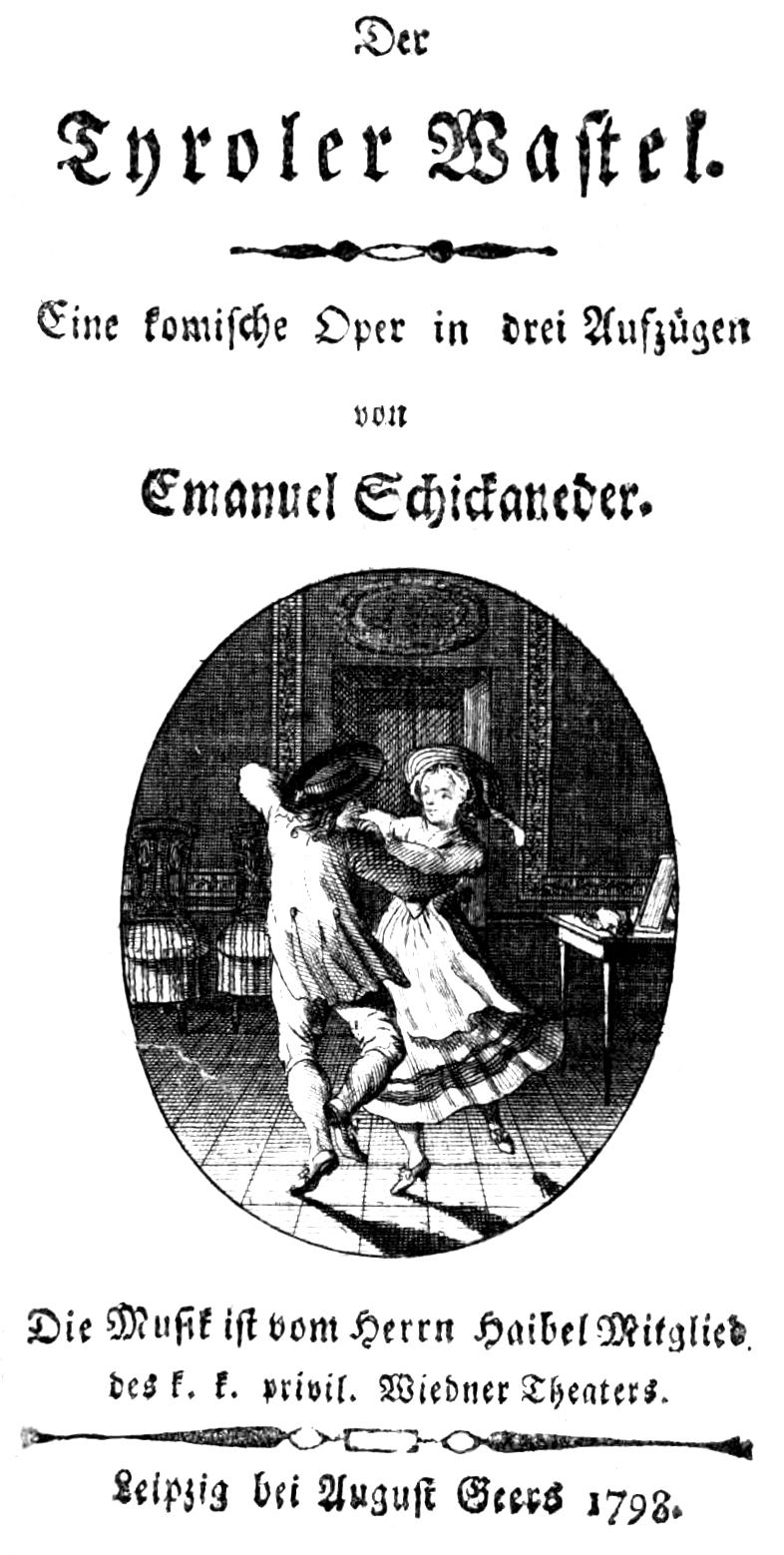
Cover of the libretto of Tyroler Wastl

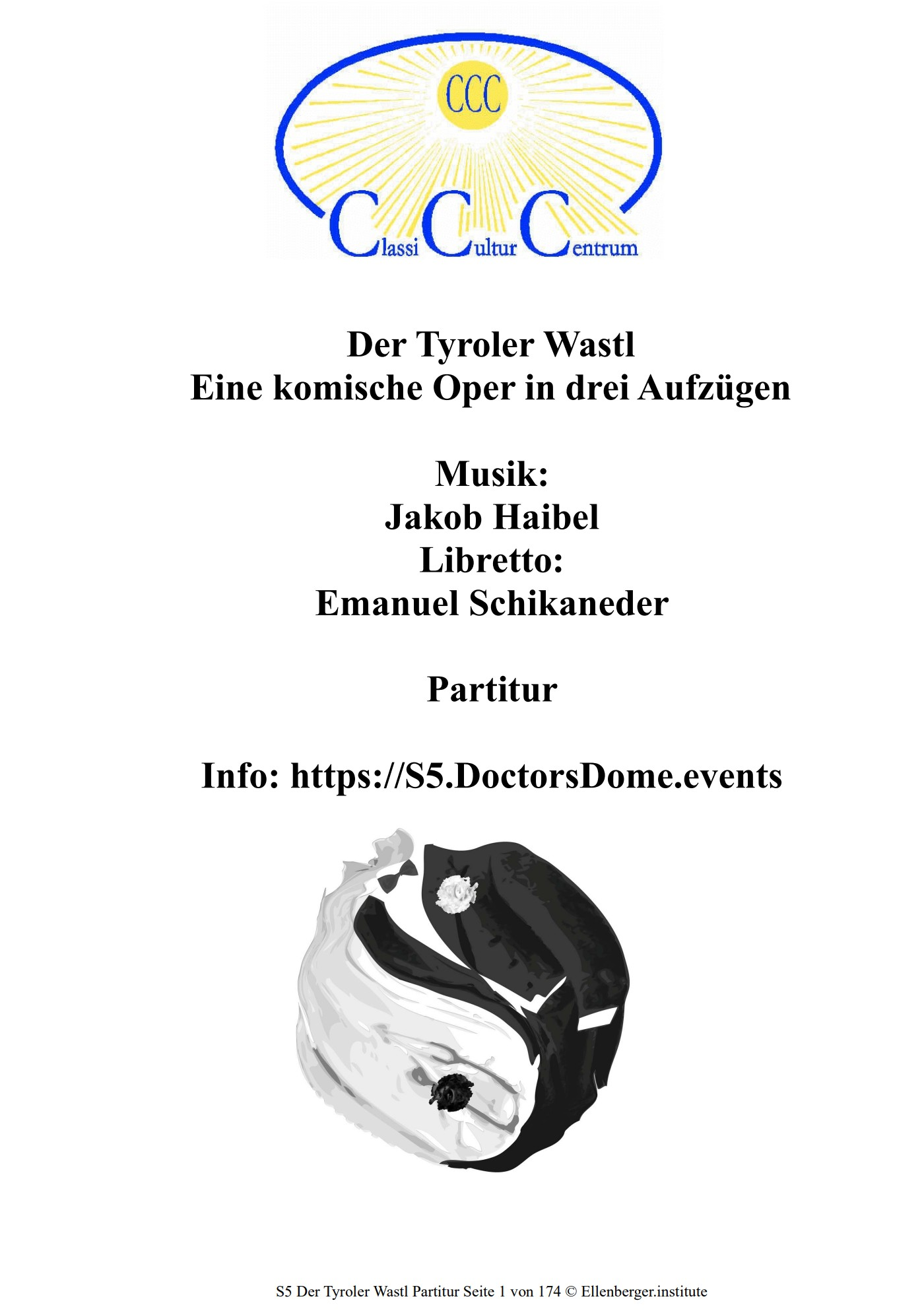
Cover of the opera "Der Tyroler Wastl" by Jakob Haibel and Emanuel Schikaneder

Der Tyroler Wastl (Sebastian from Tyrol) is a German-language comic opera in three acts with a libretto by Emanuel Schikaneder and music by Jakob Haibel, who later married Sophie Weber, the sister of Mozart's wife, Constance. Alternative titles are Der Tyroler Wastel, Der Tiroler Wastel, Tiroler Wastel, Die Tiroler in Wien.

== History ==
The opera may be based on the comedy Tiroler Wastl im Jahre 1848.

A performance takes about 73 minutes just for the music without spoken text passages. The world premiere was on 14 May 1796 in the Theater auf der Wieden. The work was also performed in a number of theatres in the German-speaking world, a sensational 130 times by 1856, making it Schikaneder's second most successful opera after The Magic Flute. The opera has apparently not been verifiably performed anywhere since then.

There is an audio recording of Sarah Traubel's aria no. 18 "Alles will ich brechen, beugen" (I wish to break and bend everything).

== Roles ==
- Herr von Tiefsinn (speaker)
- Frau von Tiefsinn, his second wife (soprano)
- Louise, Tiefsinn'ss daughter from his 1st marriage (soprano)
- Der Tyroler Wastel (bass)
- Liesel, his second wife (soprano)
- Herr von Tulippan, galant (tenor)
- Therese, chambermaid of Frau von Tiefsinn (soprano)
- Mariane, cook of family Tiefsinn (soprano)
- Joseph, young and rich baker (bass)
- Jodel, baker's apprentice (tenor)
- Princely accountant
- House servant
- Coachman
- Wirt (host) in the Prater (bass)
- Seppel a waiter (tenor)
- A harpist (tenor)
- Flutist
- Musician (with viola d'amore)
- Flower girl (speaker)
- Girl with toothpics (speaker)
- Galanterie dealer
- Several waiters (tenor and bass)
- Fiaker (2x tenor and bass)
- People

== Synopsis ==
Location: Vienna in the 18th century

=== Act 1 ===
The noble lady (only by marriage, she was previously a lady's maid), Frau von Tiefsinn, occupies herself with her lady-in-waiting on trivial matters and receives her lover, Herr von Tulippan. They receive a package from master baker Joseph for his stepdaughter Louise, believing the gifts to be from Herr von Tulippan, who barely denies this. He is accused of fraud and chased out of the house. When the ladies simply read the letter and discover that it is for Louise, they bring Tulippan back to their home. The cook, Mariane, sings to the men, "A handsome man is delicate." Louise welcomes the nightingale and sings to her, "You, dear nightingale, shall always hang by my bed." After being pardoned, Tulippan is allowed to sing "So let us parade."

Then, unexpectedly, farmer Wastl from Tyrol, the brother of Herr von Tiefsinn, arrives with his second wife. Mrs. von Tiefsinn is ladylike and disgusted by his clumsy manner and tries to avoid him.

Wastl (or Wastel) sings the opera hit "Tyroleans are open, cheerful, and happy."

Louise is finally able to speak to her father, and he approves of her union with Joseph. She is happy about this and sings, "Bliss smiles around Louise, for her father is her friend."

Afterward, all the actors enthusiastically head to the Prater to dine.

=== Act 2 ===
In a Prater pub, an innkeeper complains that no one is coming to his place. He instructs his waiters to roam the Prater to recruit customers.

In the spoken passages, it is mentioned that Frau von Tiefsinn caused a scandal by overturning the table with dishes, and everyone scattered across the Prater.

Herr von Tiefsinn arrives at the pub and allows the harpist to sing a song: "You men, beware of women." Then Wastel arrives and sings about women's loyalty in Tyrol. Gradually, everyone arrives at the pub, and Frau von Tiefsinn sits down with Therese and Tulippan in the Summer Palace. Wastel incites them to fury with his song "Who has a wicked little woman in the house?" However, the scene is interrupted by a thunderstorm, so everyone flees home, leaving the innkeeper alone with his food.

=== Act 3 ===
The next morning, Wastel is lying on the sofa in the von Tiefsinns' anteroom. When he is awakened, he is smoking, much to the horror of Frau von Tiefsinn and Therese. The ladies ask Herr von Tiefsinn to throw Wastel out. He is far inferior to Wastel, who quickly incapacitates even the coachmen and porter who have been summoned. Tulippan later presents this to the ladies as his achievement.

Joseph sings the praises of the bourgeois class, for he wishes to marry a noblewoman, namely Louise von Tiefsinn's daughter.

Frau von Tiefsinn vents her anger with the aria "Who of all men can ever dare to disobey orders?", which is somewhat reminiscent—including the high F—of the revenge aria from The Magic Flute.

Frau von Tiefsinn wishes to marry Louise to the imperial accountant, who is brought into the house by Mariane. Meanwhile, Wastel's wife, Liesel, has returned from being out all night. She explains to him that, guided by higher powers, she arrived just in time to see Mr. von Tefsinn to save him from committing suicide.

Liesl recognizes the accountant who invited her for a carriage ride the previous evening. He proposes to her, and she sings "I don't want an old man."

Meanwhile, Wastel has arranged a lawyer and circumvents Mrs. von Tiefsinn's ban on entering Louise's room, where she is under arrest. This means she is married to Joseph before Mrs. von Tiefsinn returns.

In the confrontation with Wastel, she ultimately has to back down. Mr. von Tiefsinn is about to throw her out, but pardons her when she confesses that she wants to stay with him. Wastel gives Tulippan and Mrs. von Tiefsinn money, which she refuses and finally gives to Louise as a dowry.

In the final chorus, the general joy is celebrated: "When people live in unity, there is happiness and blessing."

== Editions and sources ==
- Score manuscript in Sächsische Landesbibliothek Dresden
- Bayerische Staatsbibliothek score
- Libretto Leipzig edition with spoken texts in Österreichische Nationalbibliothek
- Libretto at Library of Congress, Edition Hamburg
- Libretto at Library of Congress, Edition Berlin
- Libretto Edition Bayerische Staatsbibliothek
- Libretto Edition Universitätsbibliothek Frankfurt
- Modern first edition of the performance material 2025
