= Cäcilia Weber =

Mozart's mother-in-law

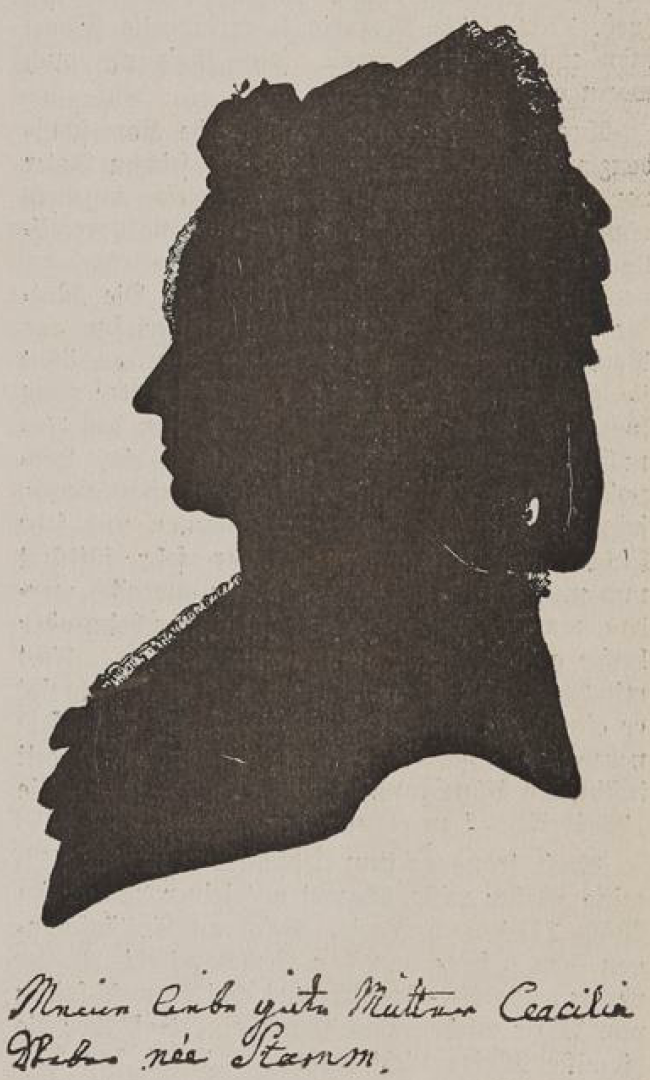
- Undated silhouette, with note by her daughter Constanze
- Born: Cäcilia Cordula Stamm; 23 October 1727; Mannheim
- Died: 22 August 1793 (aged 65); Wieden, Austria
- Known for: Mother-in-law of Wolfgang Amadeus Mozart
- Spouse: Franz Fridolin Weber (m. 1756; died 1779)
- Children: Josepha Weber; Aloysia Lange; Constanze Mozart; Sophie Weber
- Parent(s): Johann Otto Stamm; Sophia Elisabeth Wimmer
- Relatives: Karl Thomas Mozart (grandson); Franz Xaver Wolfgang Mozart (grandson)

Cäcilia Cordula Weber (née Stamm; 23 October 1727 – 22 August 1793) was the mother of Constanze Weber and the mother-in-law of Wolfgang Amadeus Mozart.

== Biography ==
She was born in Mannheim, the daughter of Johann Otto Stamm, a government secretary, and Sophia Elisabeth Wimmer. She married Franz Fridolin Weber (1733–1779) on 14 September 1756, and had four daughters: Josepha, Aloysia, Constanze, and Sophie. Constanze was the only one who did not become a professional singer, but, according to Mozart, she possessed a fine voice and musical ear. The children were born in Zell im Wiesental, but the family moved to Mannheim soon after Sophie was born.

Cäcilia first met Mozart in 1777, when he came to Mannheim in search of a job. He fell in love with her daughter Aloysia during this stay and departed for Paris after finding no permanent position in Mannheim. The family later moved to Munich, where both Aloysia and Fridolin had found jobs in the opera. It was here that Mozart encountered them again (and was rejected by Aloysia), during his journey homeward to Salzburg.

The Weber family moved to Vienna in September 1779, still following Aloysia as she pursued her career at the German Opera there. Fridolin died in the following month, and Cäcilia scrambled to keep her family afloat. Aloysia's suitor Joseph Lange agreed to help support the family with an annual stipend of 700 florins when he married Aloysia, 31 October 1779. Cäcilia also made some income by taking in boarders.

It was in this way that Mozart re-entered the Webers' lives. In 1781, he settled in Vienna, hoping to pursue his career there, and on 1 or 2 May 1781, he became a boarder in their home (in a building called Zum Auge Gottes, "God's Eye").

Cäcilia asked Mozart to move out when she realized that he had fallen in love with Constanze, for the sake of propriety. Wolfgang and Constanze finally married on 4 August 1782.

Mozart's relationship with his mother-in-law had a somewhat rocky start, as she did not get along well with Constanze. However, starting with the birth of Constanze's first child in 1783, Mozart came to grow quite fond of Cäcilia. Constanze's sister Sophie remembered in an 1825 letter:

Well, Mozart became fonder and fonder of our dear departed mother and she of him. Indeed, he often came running along in great haste to the Wieden (where she and I were lodging at the Golden Plough), carrying under his arm a little bag containing coffee and sugar, which he would hand to our good mother, saying 'Here, mother dear, now you can have a little Jause [afternoon coffee].' She used to be delighted as a child. He did this very often.

Cäcilia died in Wieden near Vienna, Austria.

== Notes ==
Sources

- Deutsch, Otto Erich (1965). Mozart: A Documentary Biography. Stanford: Stanford University Press.
- Solomon, Maynard (1995). Mozart: A Life. Harper Perennial.
