= Jakob Haibel =

- Born: July 20, 1762; Graz, Austria
- Died: March 24, 1826; Đakovo, Slavonia
- Occupations: Composer; operatic tenor; choirmaster
- Known for: Member of Schikaneder’s troupe; composer of Der Tiroler Wastel; cathedral choirmaster in Đakovo
- Spouse(s): Katharina (d. 1806); Sophie Weber (m. 1807)

Jakob Haibel (20 July 1762 Graz – 24 March 1826 Đakovo) was an Austrian composer, operatic tenor and choirmaster.

== Biography ==
Around 1789, Haibel joined Emanuel Schikaneder's company of performers at the Freihaus-Theater auf der Wieden. While there, he acted in plays and sang in operas and other musical productions. In the mid-1790s he started composing incidental music for company's plays and writing singspiele. His first score for the company was the ballet Le nozze disturbate, which premiered in 1795 to great success. The company performed the work 39 times that year alone. Beethoven based his 12 variations on a Menuett à la Vìganò WoO 68 (1795) on an air from the ballet. In 1796, his opera Der Tiroler Wastel premiered at the theater to rave reviews. The work was Haibel's greatest success and was given 66 times that year and 118 times in all at the Freihaus-Theater. The work was staged in a multitude of other theatres throughout the Austro-German part of Europe and no other original score by Haibel ever equalled its success.

Haibel continued to compose music for the theater until the death of his first wife Katharina (ca. 1768 – Vienna, 14 February 1806). At the time, he was not to be found in Vienna, for in 1804 he had already left for Diakowar (Đakovo), Slavonia, where he spent the rest of his life as the cathedral choirmaster. Recent research has brought to light 16 Masses by Haibel written during this time, preserved in the Kuhač collection at the Nacionalna i Sveučilišna Knjižnica in Zagreb.

Haibel became Mozart's posthumous brother-in-law when he married Sophie Weber, Constanze's sister, on 7 January 1807. After Haibel's death in 1826, Sophie moved to Salzburg to live with her sister.

== Works ==
- Le nozze disturbate oder die unterbrochene Hochzeit, Ballett, 1795
- Der Einzug in das Feindesquartier, Singspiel, um 1795
- Der Tyroler Wastel, komische Oper, 1796
- Östreichs treue Brüder, oder Die Scharfschützen in Tirol, oder Der Landsturm (Fortsetzung des Tiroler Wastels), Singspiel, 1797
- Das medizinische Kollegium, komische Oper, 1797
- Astaroth, der Verführer, Oper, um 1798
- Papagei und Gans oder die cisalpinischen Perrücken, Singspiel, 1799
- Alle neun und ins Zentrum, Operette, 1803
- Der kleine Cesar oder Die Familie auf dem Gebirge, Schauspiel mit Gesang, 1804
- Das Scheibenschießen oder Die ausgespielten Bräute, Singspiel, 1804
- Der Hungerthurm oder Edelsinn und Barbarey der Vorzeit, Schauspiel mit Gesang, 1805
- Die Entstehung des Arlequins und der Arlequinette, Pantomime, 1805

== Sources ==
- Peter Branscombe. The New Grove Dictionary of Opera, edited by Stanley Sadie (1992), ISBN 0-333-73432-7 and ISBN 1-56159-228-5
- Zdravko Blažeković and Ennio Stipčević. "Johann Petrus Jakob Haibel (1762-1826) and His Sixteen Newly Discovered Masses from Djakvo (Croatia)", in: Off-Mozart: Glazbena kultura i "mali majstori" srednje Europe, 1750–1820 / Musical Culture and the "Kleinmeister" of Central Europe, 1850–1826. Muzikološki zbornici 3 (Zagreb: Hrvatsko muzikološko društvo, 1995), 67–75. ISBN 953-6090-02-3
- Zdravko Blažeković, "Due musicisti nella Pannonia del primo Ottocento: Ðuro Arnod e Petrus Jakob Haibel", Danubio: Una civiltà musicale. IV: Croazia, Serbia, Bulgaria, Romania, ed. by Carlo de Incontrera and Alba Zanini (Monfalcone: Teatro Comunale di Monfalcone, 1994), 47–64.
