= Whom the Gods Love =

Whom the Gods Love may refer to:

- Whom the Gods Love (1936 film), a British biographical film
- Whom the Gods Love (1942 film), an Austrian historical musical film
