= Hans Hansen (Danish painter) =

Danish painter (1769–1828)

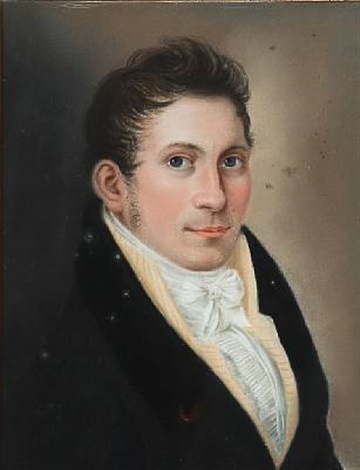
Portrait of the painter Hans Hansen by Christian Horneman (1804)

Hans Hansen (22 February 1769 – 11 February 1828) was a Danish painter who specialised in portrait painting. He is best known for his portraits of the Mozart family, painted during his second stay in Vienna: Constanze Mozart and a double portrait of her sons, Karl Thomas and Franz Xaver, which are currently on display in Salzburg.

== Biography ==
Hansen was born at Skelby in Næstved Municipality, Denmark. Hansen's father worked in the War Chancellery and later became a farm manager. When he displayed some artistic ability, he won the support of Carl Adolph von Plessen, a court chamberlain, which enabled him to enroll at the Royal Danish Academy of Fine Arts. While there, he won silver medals in 1789 and 1791. According to his diaries from this period, he took Jens Juel as his model.

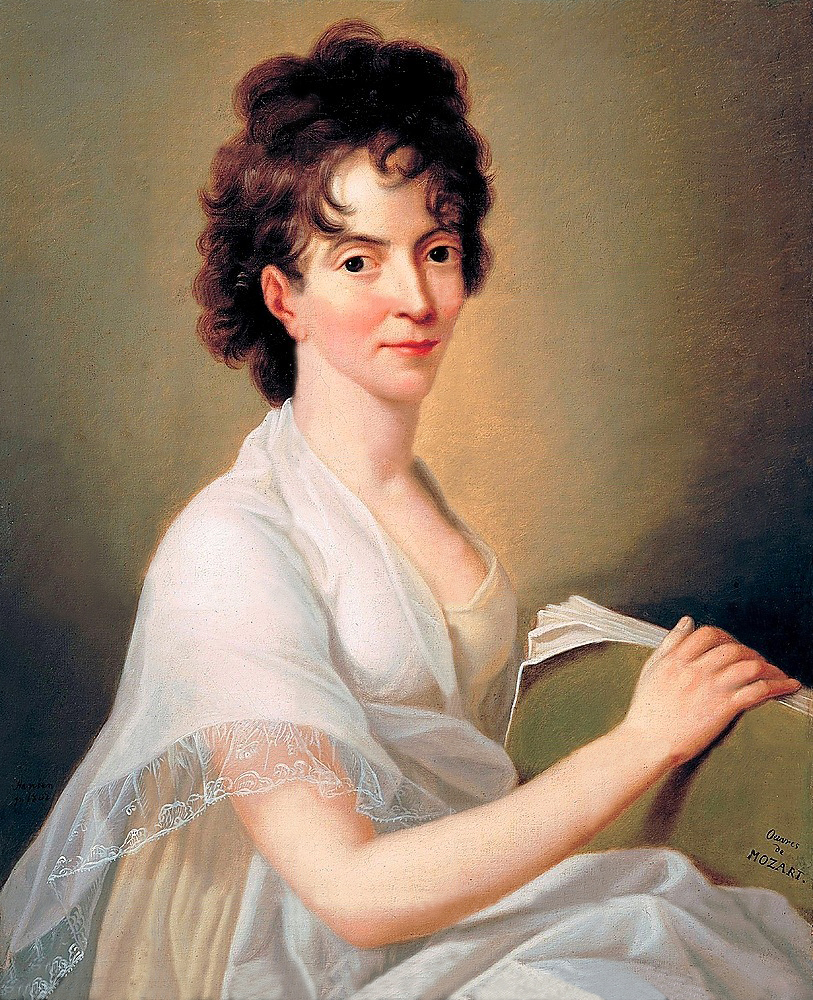
Portrait of Constanze Mozart (1802)

From 1793 to 1797, he travelled as an itinerant portrait painter in Jutland and Funen, then received more financial support from Plessen, allowing him to visit Hamburg and Vienna to continue his studies. He was awarded funding from the Fonden ad usus publicos, a fund first established in 1765 by King Frederick V to support artistic and scientific endeavors. Shortly after. he was able to study briefly in Rome, then he went back to Vienna.

After returning to Copenhagen, he became a candidate for membership in the Royal Academy and a full member in 1809. His attempts to become a Professor were unsuccessful, but he became an Artist in Residence at Charlottenborg Palace in 1815. From 1817 to 1825, he was a lecturer at the academy, where he taught perspective and mathematics. In his last years, he spent most of his time restoring old portraits at Frederiksborg Palace.

He met his future wife, Jørgine Henriette Lie (born 1778), while painting Constanze Mozart, widow of Wolfgang Amadeus Mozart, who was then married to the Danish diplomat, Georg Nikolaus von Nissen. They were married in 1803 and had a son, Constantin Hansen, named after Constanze, who stood as his godparent. He also became a well-known painter.

Hansen's other portrait sitters include Eline Heger, Christian Ditlev Frederik Reventlow, Anders Sandøe Ørsted, C. A. Lorentzen, Adam Wilhelm Moltke, Andreas Hallander, Princess Vilhelmine Marie, Friederich Münter, Bolette Puggaard and King Frederick VI.

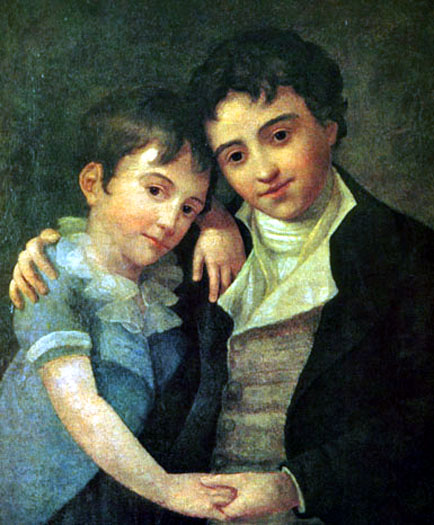
Carl and Franz Xaver Mozart (1798)

Hansen and his wife died of typhus within a month of each other. They are buried at Garnisons Cemetery in Copenhagen.
