= Sophie Weber =

Austrian singer (1763–1846)

Maria Sophie Weber
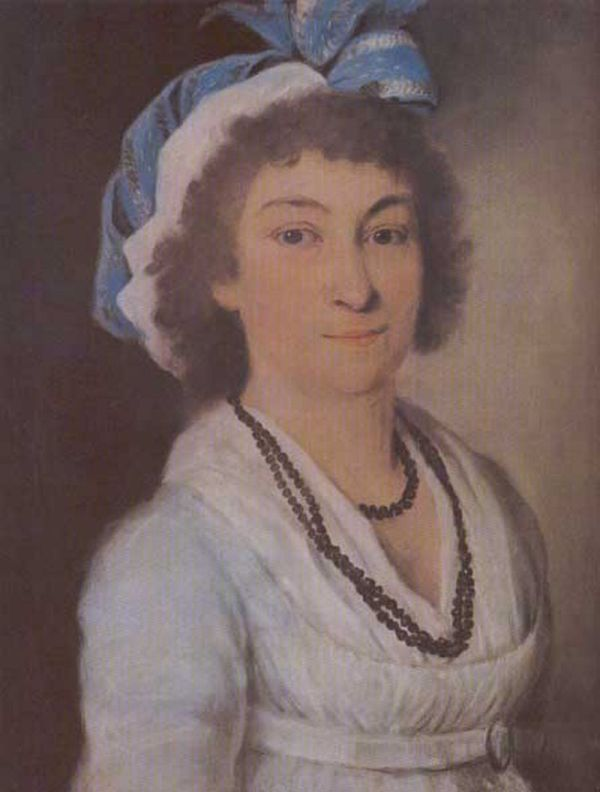
- Born: 1763; Zell im Wiesental
- Died: 1846 (aged 82–83); Salzburg
- Spouse: Jakob Haibel (m. 1807; died 1826)
- Parent(s): Cäcilia Stamm; Fridolin Weber
- Relatives: Constanze Mozart (sister); Josepha Weber (sister); Aloysia Weber (sister); Carl Maria von Weber (paternal half-cousin)

Maria Sophie Weber (1763 (Note: Clive lists this as an uncertain date, giving no place. The Grove Dictionary gives her birth date and location as: October 1763, in Zell im Wiesental.)–1846) was an Austrian singer. She was the younger sister of Wolfgang Amadeus Mozart's wife, Constanze, and is remembered primarily for the testimony she left concerning the life and death of her brother-in-law.

== Life ==
She was born into a musical family, the youngest of four sisters all of whom became trained singers; two achieved professional fame: the eldest sister Josepha Weber and the second eldest Aloysia Weber. Her mother was Cäcilia Weber (née Stamm). She moved with the family, first to Munich, then to Vienna, following the burgeoning career of Aloysia. Sophie herself sang at the Burgtheater in the 1780–81 season, but apparently did not make any kind of long-term success as a singer.

When Mozart moved to Vienna in 1781, and lodged for a time with the Weber family, he seems to have flirted with both Sophie and Constanze (the latter of whom he eventually courted and married). The incomplete Allegro in B flat KV 400, written by Mozart at this time, contains (in W. Dean Sutcliffe]'s words) "a self-contained melodic episode in G minor, with the names of Sophie and Costanze [sic] Weber inscribed above a pair of prolonged sigh figures." In a letter of 15 December 1781, Mozart described Sophie as "good-natured but feather-brained." In 1782, when Mozart and Constanze were married, she was the only Weber sister who was present at the ceremony.

When Mozart died in December 1791, 28-year-old Sophie, the last unmarried Weber daughter, lived with Cäcilia but was frequently present in the Mozart household during the composer’s brief but harrowing final illness and death, and helped Constanze care for her dying husband.

She was married on 7 January 1807 in Djakovar, Slavonia (today Đakovo in Croatia) to Jakob Haibel (1762–1826), a tenor singer, actor, and composer; he was the author of a successful Singspiel that was performed many times by the theatrical troupe of Emanuel Schikaneder. Haibel, who is said by some to have left his first wife for Sophie, was the cathedral choirmaster in Djakovar. Following Haibel's death in 1826, Sophie moved to Salzburg where Constanze, for the second time a widow, was living. After 1831 they were joined by their similarly widowed sister Aloysia, who died in 1839. The two younger sisters lived there together until Constanze's death in 1842.

Sophie outlived her younger nephew, Franz Xaver Wolfgang Mozart, by two years and died in Salzburg in 1846 at age 83.

== Remembrances of Mozart ==
Sophie's own remembrances of Mozart and his death, described by the Grove Dictionary author as "moving," come from a letter she wrote to Constanze's second husband Georg Nikolaus von Nissen, for the purpose of helping with the biography of Mozart that Nissen and Constanze were preparing. She was also interviewed by Vincent and Mary Novello in 1829 during the journey they undertook to gather information about Mozart. For some of her remembrances, see Death of Mozart.
