= The Mozart Story =

- Directed by: Karl Hartl; Frank Wisbar
- Starring: Hans Holt
- Distributed by: Screen Guild Productions
- Release date: 1948
- Country: Austria
- Language: English (dubbed from German)

The Mozart Story is a 1948 Austrian-American film. It is a re-edited version of Whom the Gods Love (1942).

== Cast ==
- Hans Holt as Wolfgang Amadeus Mozart
- William Vedder as Joseph Haydn
- René Daltgen as Ludwig van Beethoven
- Wilton Graff as Antonio Salieri
- Winnie Markus as Constance Weber Mozart
- Irene von Meyendorf as Louisa Weber
- Walther Janssen as Leopold
- Annie Rosar as Madame Weber
- Carol Forman as Catherine Cavalleria
- Tony Barr as Ruffini
- Paul Hoerbiger as Strack
- Thea Weiss as Sophia Weber
