= Fantasy No. 1 with Fugue (Mozart) =

1782 piano composition by W. A. Mozart

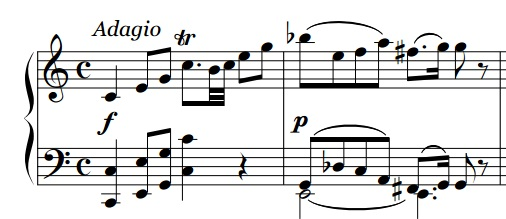
Bars 1 and 2

Fantasy No. 1 with Fugue in C major (Fantasie in German), or: Prelude and Fugue, K. 394, is a 1782 composition for solo piano by Wolfgang Amadeus Mozart which he wrote down at the insistence of his wife Constanze (Mozart usually improvised fugues; the title "Fantasia" is not Mozart's and is misleading in view of the obviously baroque structure of the piece). The work was written at a time in Mozart's life when his preoccupation with the polyphonic techniques of the Baroque era had triggered a lasting creative crisis, forcing him to come to terms individually with his great idols Johann Sebastian Bach and George Frideric Handel.

The fantasy begins with an adagio tempo indication. The opening bars feature strong dynamic contrasts. (Forte in bar 1 suddenly changes to piano in bar 2). The opening adagio changes to andante eight bars later; at this point the right hand starts playing triplet semiquavers, whilst the left hand moves above the right hand for rising quaver arpeggios and then back down to play a descending dotted semiquaver in its normal position alternately. The tempo marking changes again, this time to piu adagio before a final tempo primo eight bars later. The fantasy ends in G major, the dominant of C major.

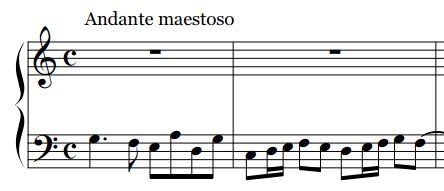
The fugue's opening theme

The fugue is marked andante maestoso, which changes to adagio for the final two bars. It ends in the tonic key, C major.
