= Zell im Wiesental =

- Town
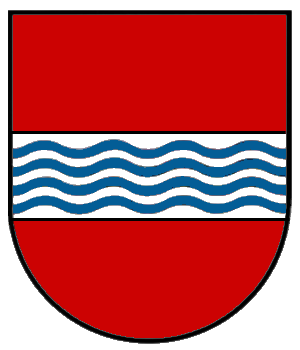
- Coat of arms

- Location of Zell im Wiesental within Lörrach district
- Interactive map of Zell im Wiesental
- Location within Germany Location within Baden-Württemberg
- Coordinates: 47°42′25″N 07°51′05″E
- Country: Germany
- State: Baden-Württemberg
- Admin. region: Freiburg
- District: Lörrach

Government
  - Mayor (2017–25): Peter Palme

Area
  - Total: 36.12 km^{2} (13.95 sq mi)
- Elevation: 443 m (1,453 ft)

Population (2025-12-31)
  - Total: 6,215
  - Density: 172.1/km^{2} (445.6/sq mi)
- Time zone: UTC+01:00 (CET)
  - Summer (DST): UTC+02:00 (CEST)
- Postal codes: 79669
- Dialling codes: 07625
- Vehicle registration: LÖ
- Website: www.zell-im-wiesental.de

Zell im Wiesental (German pronunciation: [ˈtsɛl ʔɪm ˈviːzn̩taːl], lit. 'Zell in the Wiese Valley') is a town in the district of Lörrach in Baden-Württemberg, Germany. It is situated in the Black Forest, on the river Wiese, 26 km northeast of Basel, and 32 km south of Freiburg.

The town is famous for being the birthplace of Constanze Weber, wife of Wolfgang Amadeus Mozart.

== Gallery ==
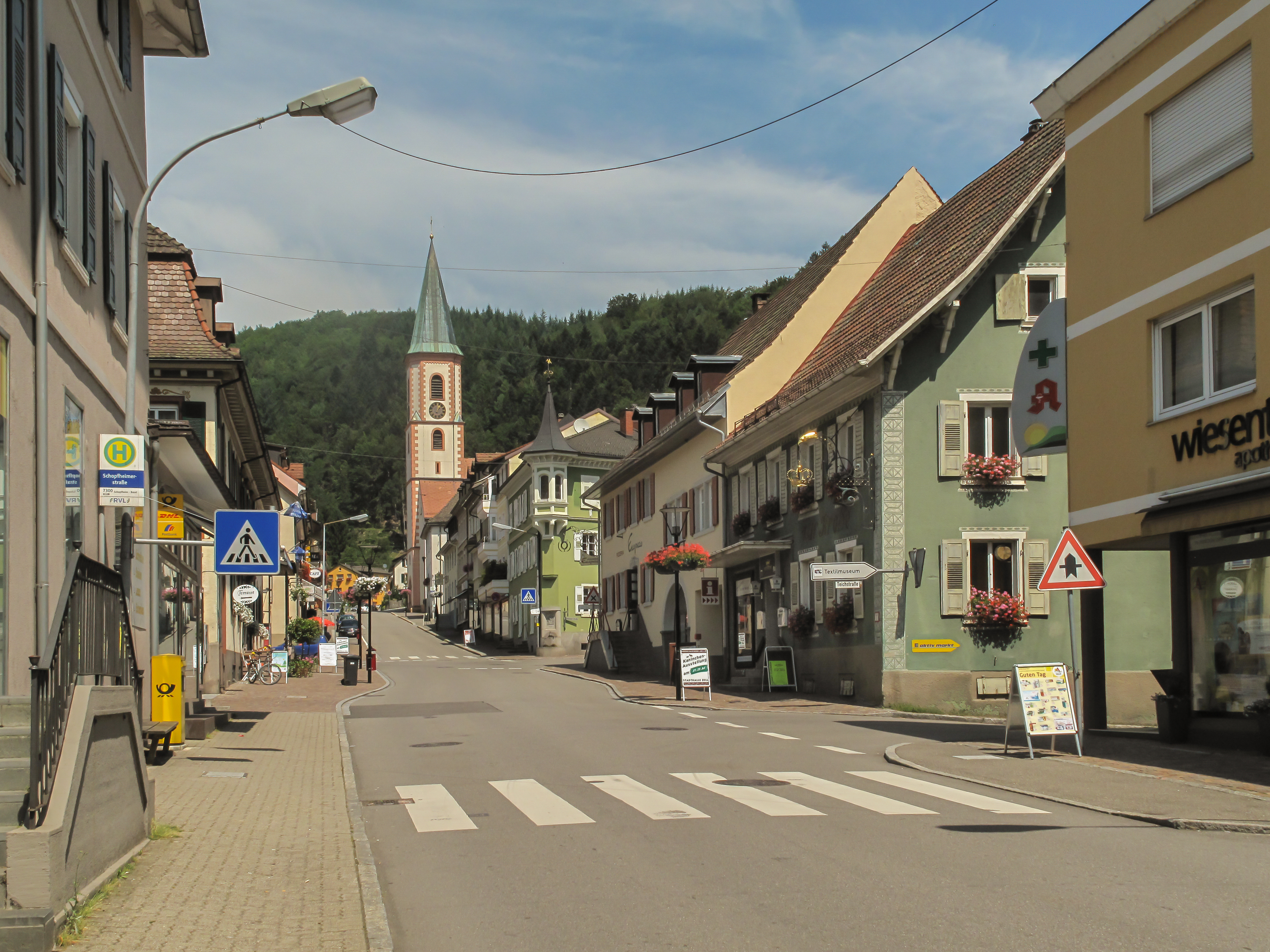
Zell im Wiesental, church (Stadtpfarrkirche) in the street

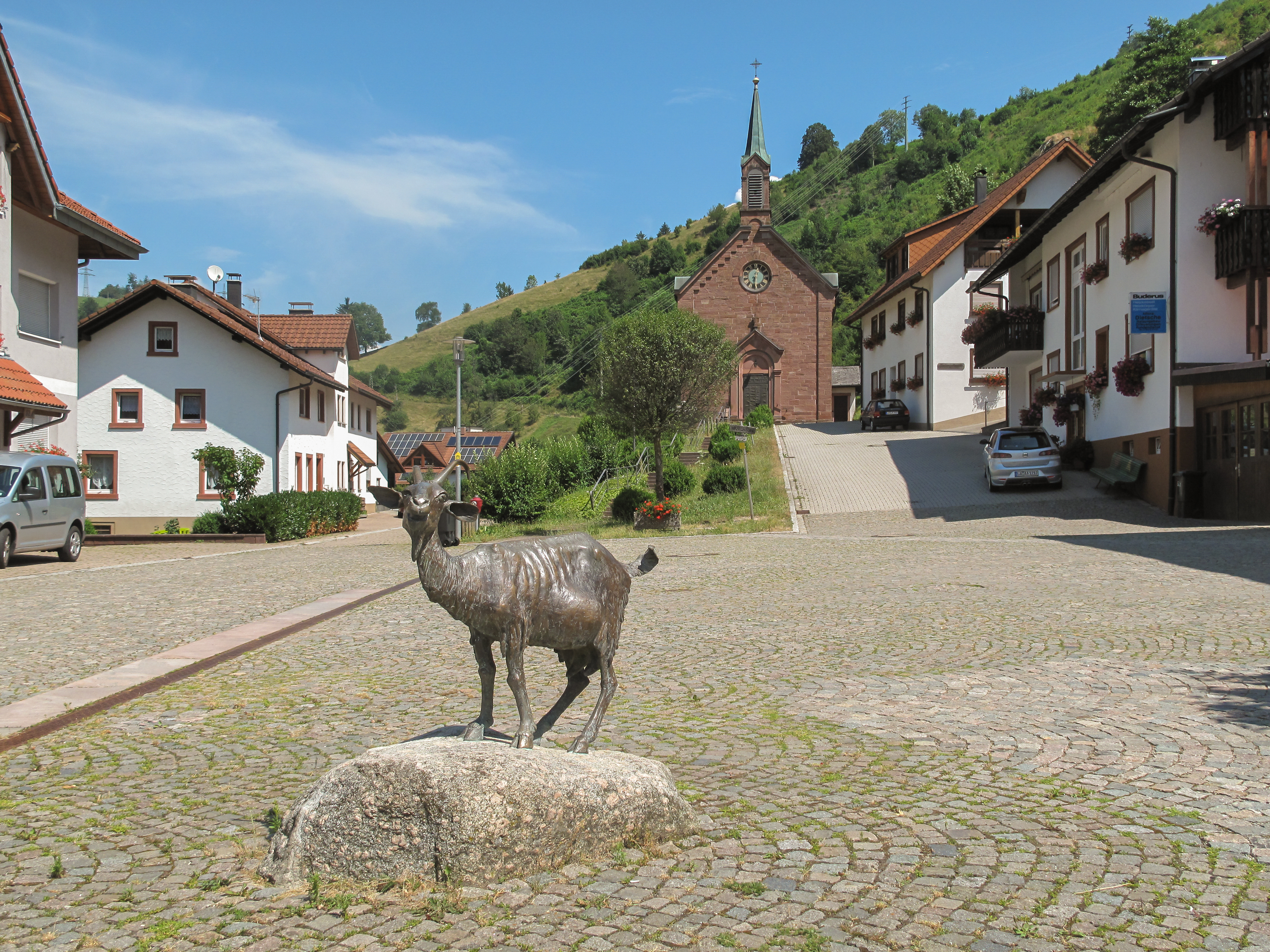
Mambach, goat with chapel (die Maria Frieden Kapelle)

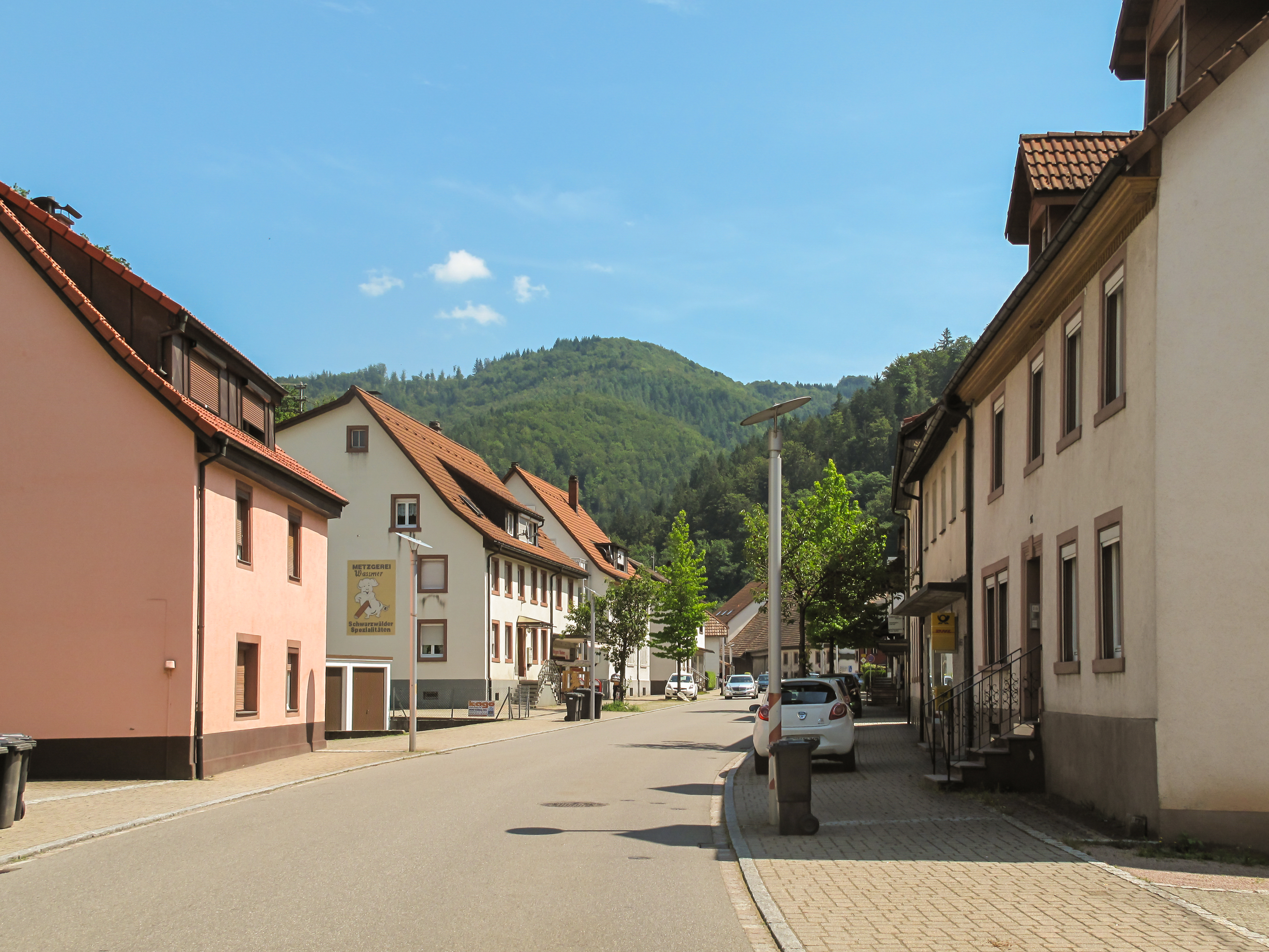
Atzenbach, view to a street

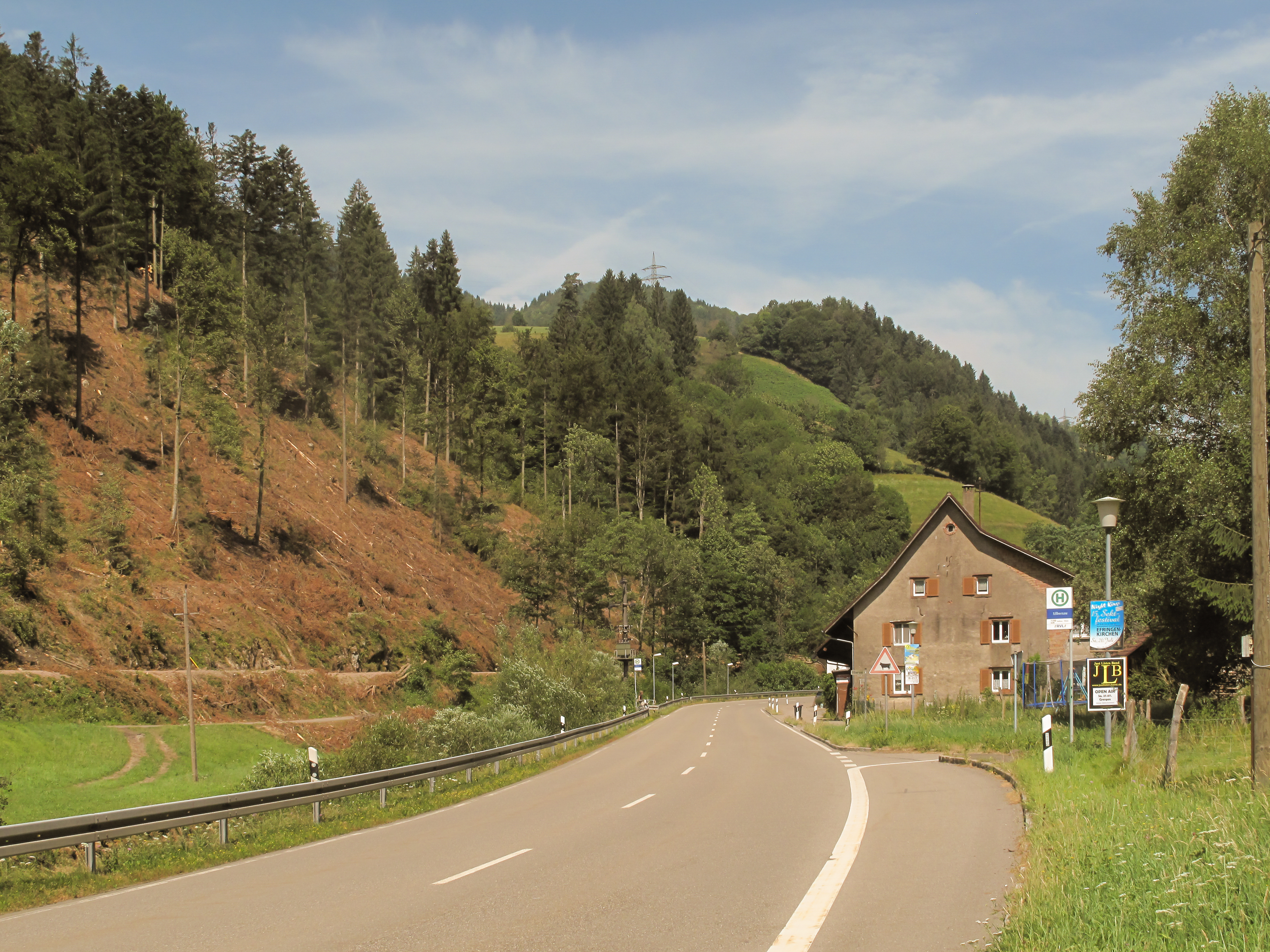
Silbersau, road panorama

== Personalities ==
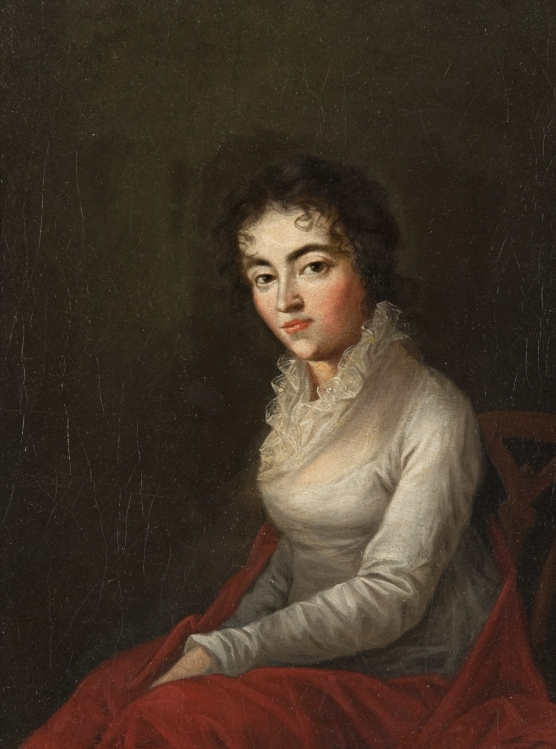
Costanze Mozart in 1782

Franz Fridolin Weber (1733-1779), was born as the son of an official in Zell. In 1754, at the age of 21, he was also appointed an official by Freiherr Ignaz Ludwig von Schönau, and in 1756 he married the Cäcilia Stamm from Mannheim. On January 5, 1762, Weber's daughter Constanze Mozart (died 1842), was born in Zell, who later married Wolfgang Amadeus Mozart. Another daughter of Weber, also born in Zell, was the singer and vocal pedagogue Aloysia Weber, (died 1839), who was born in the city between 1759 and 1761. Johann Faller was born in Todtnau, but he worked in the Zell textile industry and was responsible for social issues in Zell, including the founding of a reading society and the Zell fire brigade, As a deputy of the Second Chamber of the Badische Standesgemeinschaft, he also managed the construction of several streets in the Upper Wiesental.

Severin Kern (1900-1986) was from 1950 to 1972 lord mayor of Villingen.

In 1903 Karl Müller was born as the son of a textile worker in Zell. He was persecuted, imprisoned and forced to serve in the 999th Light Afrika Division (Wehrmacht) during the National Socialism. As a trade unionist and member of the Communist, he became after the war a member of the Socialist Unity Party of Germany (SED) and editor of the Sächsische Zeitung. Gerhard Jung (1926-1998) was born on 10 August 1926 in Zell. He became known as a dialect poet and writer in the Wiesental and beyond, he received in 1973 the Johann-Peter-Hebel-Plakette of the municipality of Hausen, 1974 the Johann-Peter-Hebel-Preis of the state of Baden-Württemberg. In 1997, Jung was awarded the Federal Cross, since 1986 he was an honorary citizen of his hometown.

== Transport ==
The municipality has a railway station, Zell (Wiesental). It is the northern terminus of the Wiese Valley Railway.

== Other sons and daughters of the town ==
- Josepha Hofer (1761-1819), soprano
