= Joseph Lange =

Austrian actor and artist (1751-1831)

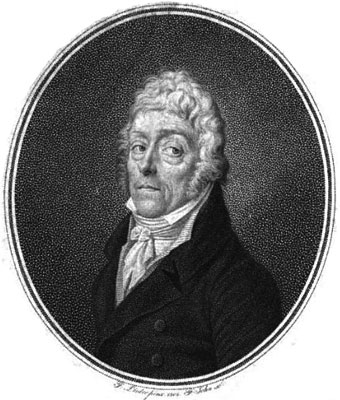
Joseph Lange (portrait by Friedrich Johann Gottlieb Lieder, 1808)

Joseph Lange (Würzburg, Holy Roman Empire 1 April 1751 – Vienna, 17 September 1831) was an actor and amateur painter of the 18th century. Through his marriage to Aloysia Weber, he was the brother-in-law of Wolfgang Amadeus Mozart.

== Life ==
His first marriage, in 1775, was to Maria Anna Elisabeth Schindler, daughter of Philipp Ernst Schindler, a miniature painter and director of painting at the Viennese porcelain factory. Maria Anna died on 14 March 1779 of pneumonia.

He married Aloysia Weber, a successful soprano, in Vienna on 31 October 1780. In that year, he also agreed to support Aloysia's widowed mother, Cäcilia, with an annual payment of 700 florins.

Mozart married Aloysia's younger sister Constanze in Vienna in 1782, and thus became Lange's brother-in-law. The Mozarts and the Langes seem to have been friends, as the written record preserves various occasions that they socialized together, as did Wolfgang and Joseph individually. Both Lange and Mozart were Masons; see Mozart and Freemasonry.

In 1783, Lange performed in one of Mozart's works, a "Masquerade" (pantomime with music) composed for Carnival. The characters were traditional figures of the Commedia dell'arte, and the music was composed by Mozart (K. 446). Lange played Pierrot, and Mozart himself took the role of Harlequin.

In 1786, Lange appeared in another work by Mozart, his opera Der Schauspieldirektor. He took the spoken role of Herz,, his wife Aloysia taking one of the two primary soprano roles, Madame Herz.

As of 1795, he lived separated from Aloysia. In 1808, he published his autobiography. From around 1800 on, he lived together with Theresia Koch, with whom he had six children.

== Assessment ==
The tenor Michael Kelly, writing in his 1826 reminiscences, called Lange an "excellent comedian"; that is, a player of comedy. Kelly had spent the early years of his career in Vienna as an opera singer.

== Lange's portraits of Mozart and family ==
Lange painted his famous portrait of his brother-in-law in 1782-1783. The following image is a detail of the portrait emphasizing Mozart's face:

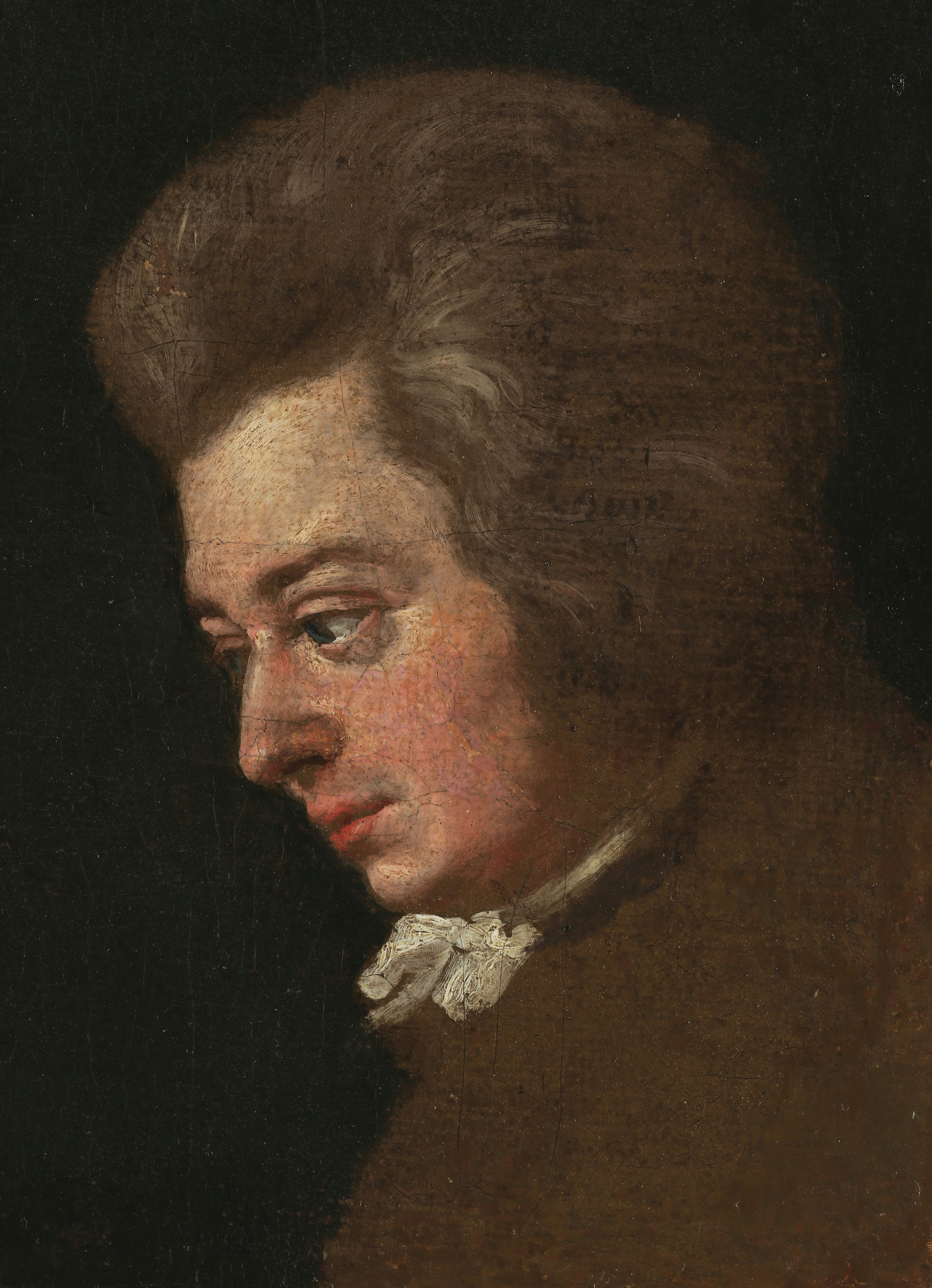

The complete portrait was later affixed to a larger painting left unfinished. It is shown in the next figure.

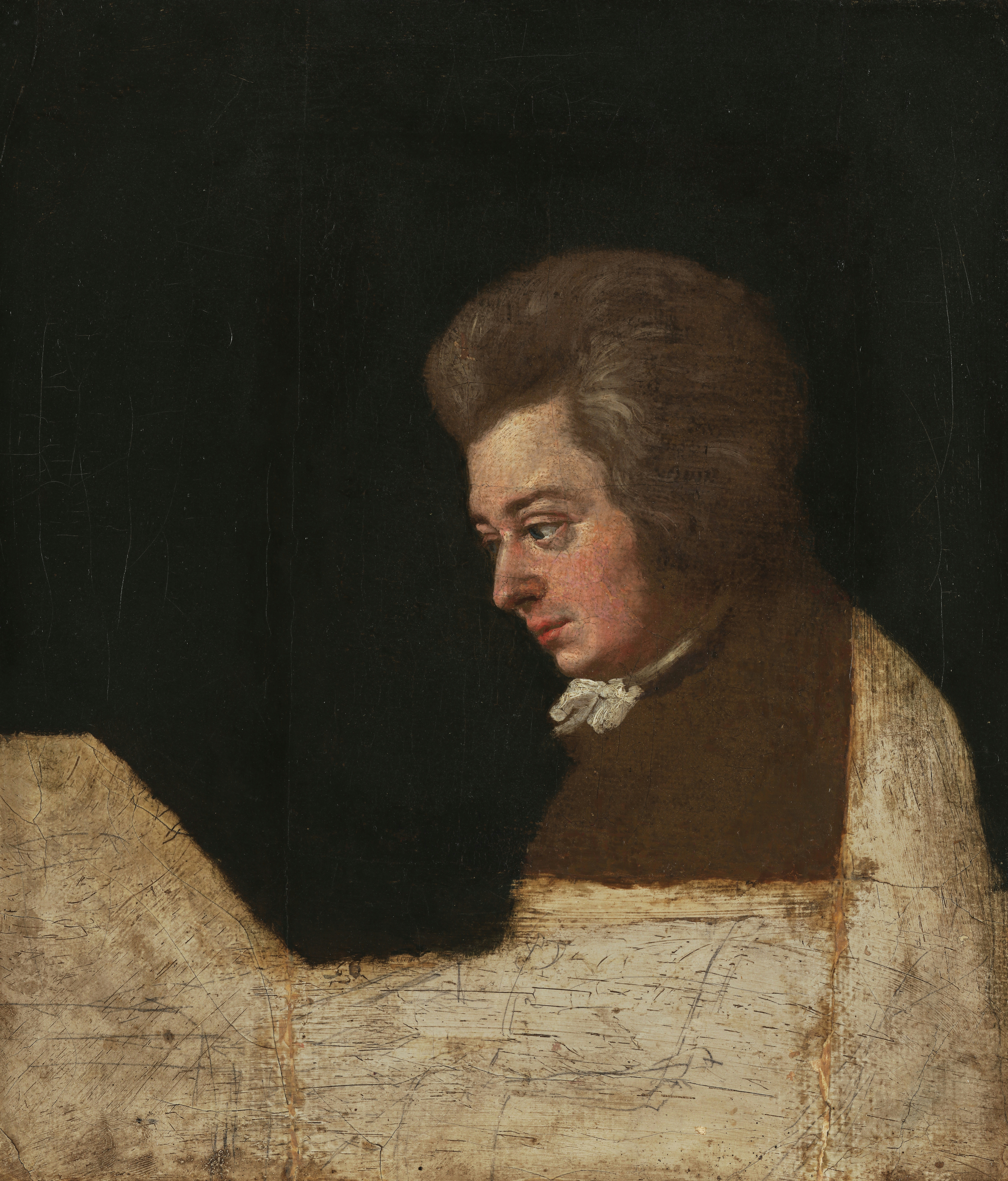

In March 2009, the musicologist Michael Lorenz was the first to realize that the painting originally was a miniature about 19 x 15 centimetres in size, showing only Mozart's face. It was later affixed to a larger canvas, apparently with the intention to portray Mozart seated at the piano, but the enlarged painting was never completed.

Constanze Mozart, interviewed in old age by Vincent and Mary Novello, said that Lange's portrait was "by far the best likeness of him."

Lange also painted a small portrait of Constanze in 1782, which was later enlarged:

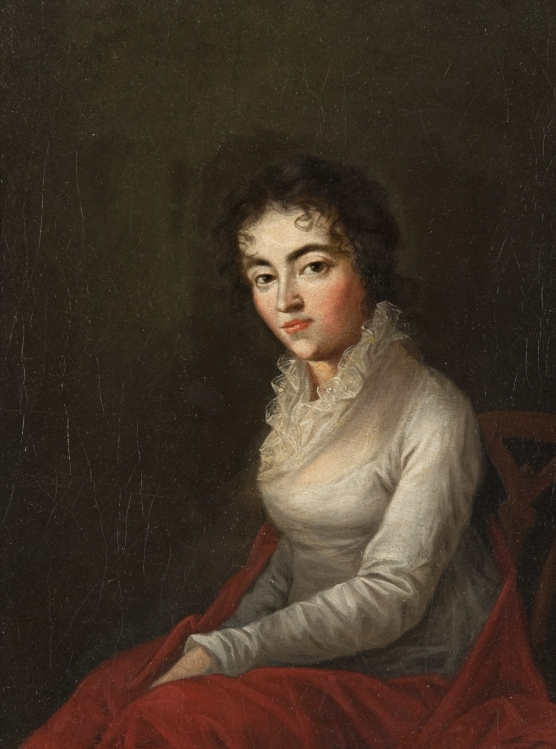

During Leopold Mozart's visit to Vienna in 1785, Lange drew a portrait of him as well, but this is lost. He continued to paint into his old age.

== Sources ==
- Lange, Joseph (1808). Biographie des Joseph Lange. Vienna: Peter Rehms sel. Witwe.
- Blümml, Emil Karl (1923). Aus Mozarts Freundes- und Familien-Kreis. Vienna: E. Strache.
- Deutsch, Otto Erich (1965). Mozart: A Documentary Biography. Stanford, CA: Stanford University Press.
- Einstein, Alfred (1962). Mozart: His Character, His Work. Oxford University Press.
