= Franz Xaver Wolfgang Mozart =

Son of Wolfgang Amadeus Mozart (1791–1844)

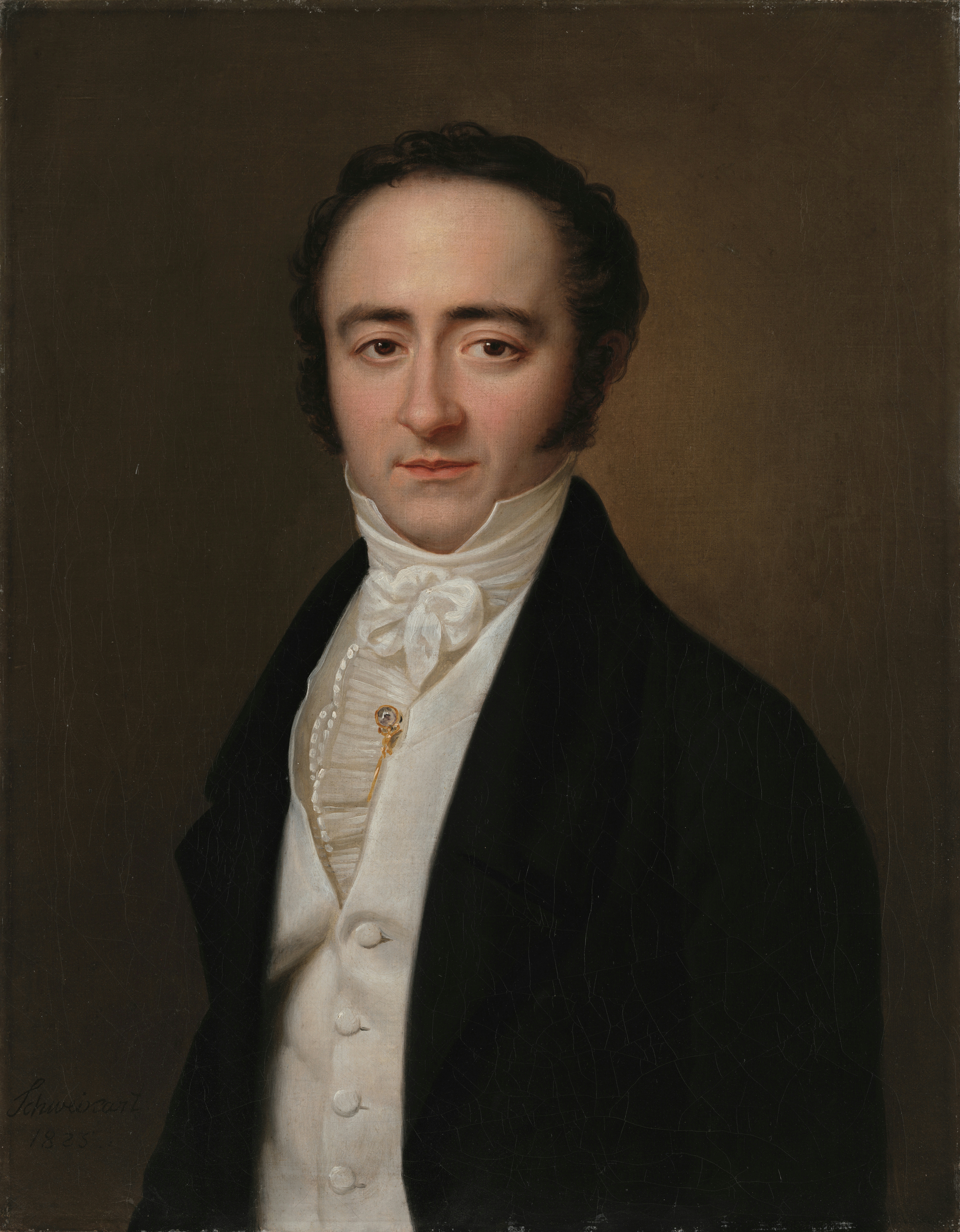
- Franz Xaver Wolfgang Mozart (1825)
- Born: July 26, 1791; Vienna, Archduchy of Austria, Holy Roman Empire
- Died: July 29, 1844 (aged 53); Karlsbad, Kingdom of Bohemia, Austrian Empire
- Parents: Wolfgang Amadeus Mozart; Constanze Weber
- Relatives: Karl Thomas Mozart (brother)

Franz Xaver Wolfgang Mozart (26 July 1791 – 29 July 1844), also known as Wolfgang Amadeus Mozart Jr., was the youngest child of six born to composer Wolfgang Amadeus Mozart and his wife Constanze and the younger of his parents' two surviving children. He was a composer, pianist, conductor, and teacher of the late classical period whose musical style was of an early Romanticism, heavily influenced by his father's mature style.

== Biography ==
Franz Xaver Wolfgang Mozart was born in Vienna, four months and ten days before his father's death. Although he was baptized Franz Xaver Mozart, he was always called Wolfgang by his family. Under the supervision and support of close family friend Joseph Haydn, he received excellent musical instruction from Antonio Salieri and Johann Nepomuk Hummel, and studied composition with Johann Georg Albrechtsberger and Sigismund von Neukomm. He learned to play both the piano and violin. Like his father, he started to compose at an early age. "In April 1805, the thirteen-year-old Wolfgang Mozart made his debut in Vienna in a concert in the Theater an der Wien."

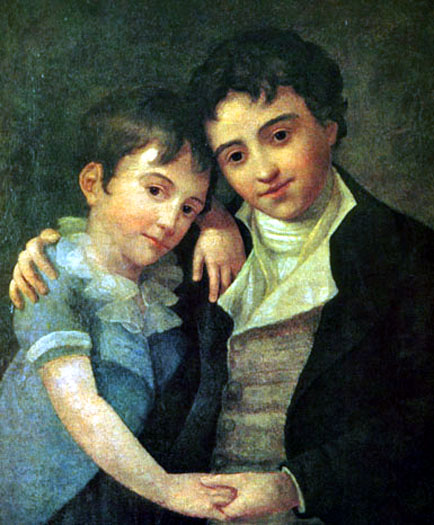
The two surviving sons of Wolfgang Amadeus and Constanze Mozart: Franz Xaver Wolfgang (left) and Karl Thomas (right); painting by Hans Hansen, Vienna, 1800

Mozart became a professional musician and enjoyed moderate success both as a teacher and a performer. Unlike his father, he was introverted and given to self-deprecation. He constantly underrated his talent and feared that whatever he composed would be compared with what his father had done.

Needing money, in 1808, he traveled to Lemberg (now Lviv), where he gave music lessons to the daughters of the Polish count Wiktor Baworowski. Although the pay was good, Franz felt lonely in the town of Pidkamin, near Rohatyn, so in 1809 he accepted an offer from another Polish aristocrat, the imperial chamberlain, Count von Janiszewski, to teach his daughters music in the town of Burshtyn. Besides teaching, he gave local concerts, playing his own and his father's pieces. These concerts introduced him to the important people in Galicia.

After two years in Burshtyn, he moved to Lemberg (Lviv) in 1813 where he spent 25 years teaching (with students including Julie von Webenau, née Baroni-Cavalcabò, whose mother Josephine (1788-1860) became his lover and sole heir) and giving concerts. Between 1826 and 1829, he conducted the choir of Saint Cecilia which consisted of 400 amateur singers. In 1826, he conducted his father's Requiem during a concert at the Ukrainian Greek Catholic cathedral of St. George. From this choir, he created the musical brotherhood of Saint Cecilia and thus the first school of music in Lemberg. He did not give up performing and in the years 1819 to 1821, traveled throughout Europe. In 1819, he gave concerts in Warsaw, Elbing and Danzig (Gdańsk).

In the 1820s, Mozart was one of 50 composers to write a variation on a theme of Anton Diabelli for part II of the Vaterländischer Künstlerverein. Part I was devoted to the 33 variations supplied by Beethoven which have gained an independent identity as his Diabelli Variations Op. 120 whom Mozart met in 1807.

In 1838, Mozart left for Vienna (where he met Robert Schumann), and then for Salzburg, where he was appointed as the Kapellmeister of the Mozarteum. From 1841, he taught the pianist Ernst Pauer. Mozart died from stomach cancer on 29 July 1844, in the town of Karlsbad (now Karlovy Vary) where he was buried.

Like his brother, he was unmarried and childless. His will was executed by Josephine de Baroni-Cavalcabò (1788–1860), a longtime patron to whom he dedicated his cello sonata.

The shadow of his father loomed large over him even in death. The following epitaph was etched on his tombstone: "May the name of his father be his epitaph, as his veneration for him was the essence of his life."

== Compositions ==
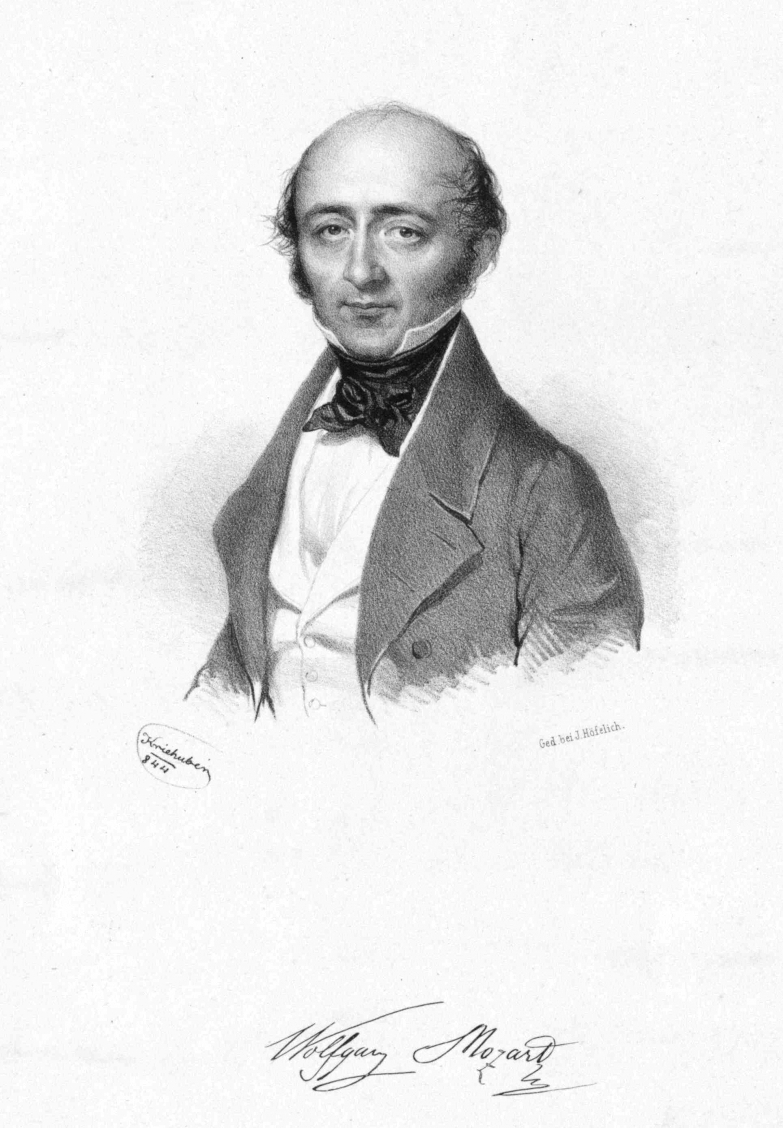
Lithograph of the composer in his latter years, by Josef Kriehuber

=== Works by genre ===
Franz Xaver Wolfgang had a relatively small output (his opus numbers only go up to 30) and after 1820 he seems to have given up composing almost entirely; in particular, there is an 11-year gap (1828 to 1839) when he seems to have not written anything. Nevertheless, recordings of his music can be found today. He wrote mainly chamber music and piano music, with his largest compositions being the two piano concertos.

==== Orchestral works ====
- Sinfonia
- Overture in D major

==== Concertante ====
- Piano Concerto No. 1 in C major, Op. 14 (1808, published in 1811)
- Piano Concerto No. 2 in E♭ major, Op. 25 (1818)

The two piano concertos differ somewhat. The first concerto could pass for one of his father's late (K. 550 and above) works, except for a youthful exuberance and the piano's tessitura which had been expanded in 1795, just after Mozart senior died. The second concerto is more contemporary to the 1810s with a more virtuosic piano part showing hints that the younger Mozart was developing his own style.

==== Chamber works ====
- Piano Quartet in G minor, Op. 1 (published 1802)
- Sonata for Violin and Piano in B♭ major, Op. 7
- 6 pieces for flute and 2 horns, Op. 11
- Sonata for Violin and Piano in F major, Op. 15
- Sonata for violoncello or violin and piano in E major, Op. 19 (published in 1820)
- Rondo in E minor for flute and piano

==== Piano works ====
- Variations on Minuet from Don Giovanni, Op. 2
- Piano Sonata in G major, Op. 10
- Six Polonaises mélancoliques for piano, Op. 17
- Quatre Polonaises mélancoliques for piano, Op. 22
- Five Variations on a romance from Méhul's Joseph, Op. 23 (pub. 1820) (until 1994 mistakenly attributed to the young Liszt, S147a)
- Two polonaises for piano, Op. 24
- Diabelli's Waltz – V28 (In the 1820s Franz Xaver Wolfgang Mozart was one of 50 composers to write a variation on a theme of Anton Diabelli for part II of the Vaterländischer Künstlerverein)

==== Choral and vocal works ====
- Kantate an Joseph Haydn auf dessen 73. Geburtstag (Cantata for the 73rd Birthday of Joseph Haydn), FXWM I:2
- Der erste Frühlingstag (The First Spring Day), cantata for solo, choir and orchestra, Op. 28
- "Festchor" for the unveiling of the Mozart monument in Salzburg, Op. 30 (1840)
- Songs with piano accompaniment
  - 8 German songs, Op. 5
  - 6 songs, Op. 9
  - 6 Songs, Op. 21
  - 3 German Songs, Op. 27
  - Entzückung
  - In der Väter Hallen ruhte
  - Ständchen
  - Erinnerung
  - An Emma ("Weit in nebelgraue Ferne")

=== Works by opus number ===
- Opus 1: Piano Quartet in G minor (1802 ad.)
- Opus 2: Variations in F major on a minuet of Final Don Giovanni by W. A. Mozart (1805)
- Opus 3: Variations in A major
- Opus 4: Rondeau in F major
- Opus 5: 8 German songs
  - No. 1 – Die Einsamkeit
  - No. 2 – Das Klavier
  - No. 3 – Der Vergnügsame
  - No. 4 – Aus den Griechischen
  - No. 5 – Todtengräberlied
  - No. 6 – Mein Mädchen
  - No. 7 – Maylied
  - No. 8 – Das Geheimniss
- Opus 6: Variations in F major
- Opus 7: Sonata for Violin and Piano in B♭ major
- Opus 8: Variations in G minor
- Opus 9: 6 songs
  - No. 1 – Das liebende Mädchen
  - No. 2 – An spröde Schönen
  - No. 3 – Nein!
  - No. 4 – Der Schmetterling auf einem Vergissmeinnicht
  - No. 5 – Klage an den Mond
  - No. 6 – Erntelied
- Opus 10: Piano Sonata in G major, FXWM VII: 8 (July 1807)
- Opus 11: 6 pieces for flute and two horns
- Opus 12: Romance: Song, In der Väter Hallen ruht (The father rested halls )
- Opus 13: Aria buffa from opera 'Der Schauspieldirektor' by W.A. Mozart
- Opus 14: Piano Concerto No. 1 in C major (1808 ad 1811).
- Opus 15: Sonata for violin and piano in F major
- Opus 16: 7 Variations in D major after Coriolano Giuseppe Niccolini (1813)
- Opus 17: 6 Melancholy Polonaises (Six Polonaises mélancoliques) (1811–14)
- Opus 18: 7 Variations in D minor on a Russian melody (1809 ad 1820)
- Opus 19: Sonata for cello (or violin) and piano in E major (published 1820 in Leipzig Peters)
- Opus 20: Variations on a Russian Theme
- Opus 21: 6 songs
  - No. 1 – Aus dem Französischen des J. J. Rousseau
  - No. 2 – Seufzer
  - No. 3 – Die Entzückung
  - No. 4 – An Sie
  - No. 5 – An die Bäche
  - No. 6 – Le Baiser
- Opus 22: 4 Melancholy Polonaises (Quatre Polonaises mélancoliques) (1815–18)
- Opus 23: Five Variations on a romance from Méhul's Joseph (28 October 1816, published 1820/24) Dedicated to Josephine Baroni-Cavalcabò. (Until 1994 the work was attributed to the young Liszt – five or nine when publishing – and bore the catalog number S147a)
- Opus 24: An Emma ("Weit in nebelgraue Ferne")
- Opus 25: Piano Concerto No. 2 in E♭ major (1818) Premiere in Lemberg, 17 December 1818
- Opus 26: 2 Melancholy Polonaises (1824)
- Opus 27: 3 German songs
  - No. 1 – An den Abendstern
  - No. 2 – Das Finden
  - No. 3 – Bertha's Lied in der Nacht
- Opus 28: Der erste Frühlingstag, cantata for choir soloists and orchestra, Angels of God proclaim Christmas song (arr. Extrait d'un duo de la cantate op. 28)
- Opus 29: Spring greeting song
- Opus 30: Festchor for the inauguration of the Salzburg Mozart monument (1840)

Without opus

- Rondo F major (1802)
- Cantata for the 73rd anniversary of Joseph Haydn (1805)
- March in G major for piano, FXWM VII: 9 (February 1809)
- Ländler in G major for piano, FXWM VII: 19 (September 1810)
- German dance in D minor for piano, FXWM VII: 23 (1812)
- German dance in G minor for piano, FXWM VII: 24 (1812)
- Fantasy in A major, for piano on a Russian Song "Tschem tebja ja ogortschila" and a Krakowiak, FXWM VII: 30 (1815)
- Andantino in A major for piano, FXWM VII: 41 (August 1841)
- Sonata movement for flute and piano in E minor ("Rondo")
- Symphony
- Erinnerung
- Ständchen

== Liszt misattribution ==
Franz Xaver Mozart's Five Variations on a romance from Méhul's Joseph, Op. 23, was published in 1820. But the work was until 1994 mistakenly attributed to the young Liszt: a copyist's manuscript of the work wrongly noted that it was "par le jeune Liszt" (by the young Liszt). The work was published in good faith by the Neue Liszt-Ausgabe in 1990 and catalogued as Liszt's S147a. Liszt scholar Leslie Howard recorded the work in similar good faith in 1992 for his series of recordings of the complete music for solo piano by Liszt (for the disc entitled The Young Liszt). But shortly afterwards Howard noted in his sleeve notes for the disc's release:

It has since been established that the attribution is false and that the work is from the pen of Mozart’s son Franz Xaver and was published as his opus 23 in 1820. But since the work remains unknown and unrecorded, like the vast majority of F X Mozart's output, and since the writing is not vastly different from some of the other pieces in this collection, it was thought best not to discard it.

== Monuments ==
There is a monument of Franz Xaver Wolfgang Mozart erected in Lviv in Ukraine, in Yevhena Malanyuka Square.
