= Josepha Weber =

German soprano (1758–1819)

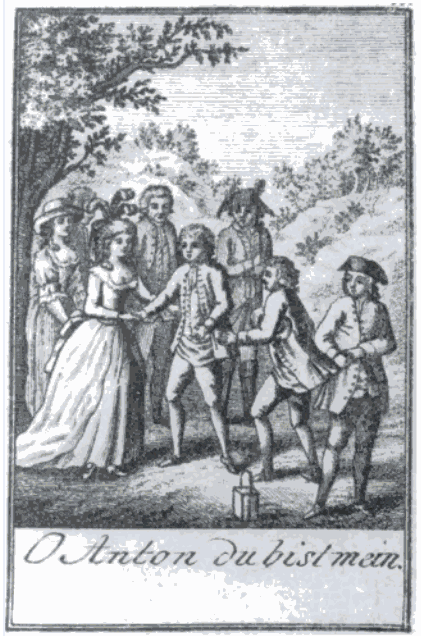
Josepha Hofer in performance with the Schikaneder troupe: the number "O Anton du bist mein" from the Singspiel Die Zween Anton. Hofer is in the foreground, holding the hand of tenor Benedikt Schack.

Maria Josepha Weber (later Josepha Hofer, Josepha Meier; 1758 – 29 December 1819) was a German soprano of the classical era. She was a sister-in-law of Wolfgang Amadeus Mozart, and the first to perform the role of The Queen of the Night in Mozart's opera The Magic Flute (1791). She was also the dedicatee of Mozart's concert aria K. 580, inscribed "für Madame Hoffer," and originated roles in operas by Paul Wranitzky, Peter von Winter, Franz Xaver Süssmayr, and other composers associated with the Theater auf der Wieden.

== Life ==
She was born in Zell im Wiesental, in present-day Baden-Württemberg, Germany, the daughter of Fridolin Weber and Cäcilia Weber (née Stamm). She had three younger sisters (in descending order of age): Aloysia, who was an early love interest of Mozart and sang in his later operas; Constanze, who married Mozart in 1782; and Sophie. The composer Carl Maria von Weber was the son of her father's half-brother.

=== Career in Vienna ===
Josepha grew up mostly in Mannheim, and moved with her family first to Munich then to Vienna, following the singing career of her sister Aloysia. By 1789 she was the prima donna in the theatrical troupe run by Johann Friedel at the suburban Theater auf der Wieden. Following Friedel's death in that year, the theater was taken over by Emanuel Schikaneder, who retained her in the new company he formed. She appears to have been an important member of the troupe: the collaborative opera Der Stein der Weisen, a sort of ancestor to The Magic Flute, includes no arias for coloratura soprano because at the time it was written Hofer was on maternity leave.

In 1789, Hofer premiered the title role of Oberon in Paul Wranitzky's Oberon, König der Elfen at the Theater auf der Wieden, demonstrating her command of both coloratura technique and dramatic expression. The success of Wranitzky's Oberon is thought to have influenced Schikaneder's decision to collaborate with Mozart on The Magic Flute.

=== The Magic Flute and Mozart ===
At the (highly successful) premiere of The Magic Flute in 1791, Hofer took the role of the Queen of the Night, a famously demanding coloratura part. Mozart, familiar with Hofer's vocal capabilities through their family connection, tailored both of the Queen's arias to showcase her extraordinary upper register, most notably the second-act "Der Hölle Rache kocht in meinem Herzen," which features rapid passagework ascending to F6 — among the highest notes in the operatic repertoire of the period. The vocal range of the Queen of the Night role covers two octaves, from F4 to F6, and demands a combination of lyric flexibility (in the first aria, "O zittre nicht, mein lieber Sohn") and dramatic power (in the second) that was virtually unprecedented.

Mozart also composed the concert aria "Schon lacht der holde Frühling," K. 580, inscribed "für Madame Hoffer," in 1789, further evidence of his regard for her specific vocal capabilities.

An anecdote from Mozart's time, recorded in an 1840 letter from composer Ignaz von Seyfried to librettist Georg Friedrich Treitschke, relates that on the last evening of Mozart's life — 4 December 1791, five weeks into the opera's initial run — the dying composer whispered to his wife Constanze: "Quiet, quiet! Hofer is just taking her top F; — now my sister-in-law is singing her second aria, 'Der Hölle Rache'; how strongly she strikes and holds the B-flat."

She continued to perform the role of the Queen of the Night until 1801, when she relinquished it at age 43.

=== Other roles and later career ===
Hofer premiered several other notable roles. She was again the Queen of the Night in Schikaneder and Winter's sequel to The Magic Flute, Das Labyrinth oder der Kampf mit den Elementen (1798). She also performed in operas by Franz Xaver Süssmayr (Der Spiegel von Arkadien) and in works by Jacob Haibel, who married her sister Sophie. Vincenzo Righini composed the role of Erifile in his cantata La sorpresa amorosa, ossia Il natale d'Apollo for Hofer; the surviving score contains pencilled annotations in Antonio Salieri's hand adding additional coloratura passages specifically for her voice.

Hofer's repertoire was broader than the Queen of the Night role alone. She also performed the Countess in Mozart's Le nozze di Figaro and Konstanze in Die Entführung aus dem Serail. In 1801, she and her second husband Sebastian Meier performed in concert performances of Mozart's La clemenza di Tito in German, with Hofer singing the role of Annio — generally regarded as a mezzo-soprano part — indicating her adaptation to the changes in her voice as she aged.

=== Marriages ===
She married twice. Her first husband (married 21 July 1788 in St. Stephen's Cathedral) was the musician Franz de Paula Hofer (1755–96). Hofer was employed as a violinist at the Imperial court. Her second husband (1797) was the singer Sebastian Meier (1773–1835). Meier was the first to perform the role of Pizarro in Beethoven's opera Fidelio.

Josepha Meier retired from singing in 1805, and died in Vienna on 29 December 1819.

== Voice and legacy ==
Of her singing, the New Grove says: "According to contemporary reports, she commanded a very high tessitura but had a rough edge to her voice and lacked stage presence." The former quality equipped her to take on the very difficult coloratura passages that Mozart wrote into the Queen of the Night's part.

However, the number of composers who wrote specifically for Hofer's voice — including Mozart, Wranitzky, Süssmayr, Winter, Haibel, Righini, and potentially Salieri — suggests that her capabilities were valued well beyond the single dimension described in the Grove assessment. The absence of coloratura writing from Der Stein der Weisen during her maternity leave, and its prominent return in The Magic Flute upon her availability, further indicates her importance to the compositional output of the Theater auf der Wieden company.

In 2020, German soprano Sarah Traubel released Arias for Josepha (Sony Classical), a recording of fourteen arias written for or performed by Hofer, including five world premiere recordings of works by Haibel, Süssmayr, Righini, Winter, and Wranitzky. The album received critical acclaim, including a four-star review from Gramophone, and brought renewed attention to the breadth of repertoire associated with Hofer beyond the Queen of the Night arias.

== Works cited ==
- Buch, David Joseph (1 January 2007). Der Stein der Weisen (in German). A-R Editions, Inc. ISBN 978-0-89579-616-5.
- Deutsch, Otto Erich (1 June 1966). Mozart: A Documentary Biography. Stanford University Press. ISBN 978-0-8047-0233-1.
