= Georg Nikolaus von Nissen =

Danish diplomat and music historian (1761–1826)

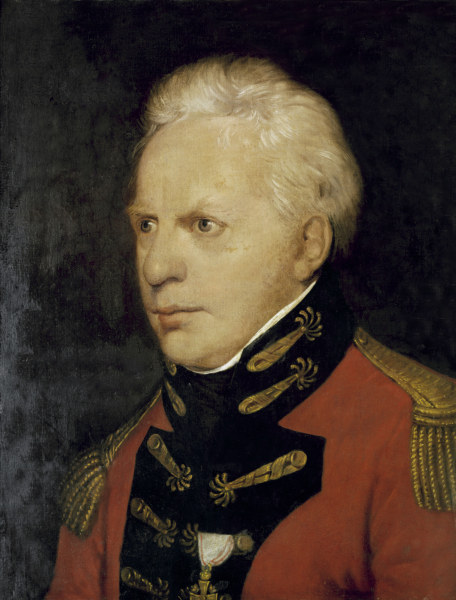
Georg Nikolaus Nissen; painting by Ferdinand Jagemann, 1809

Georg Nikolaus von Nissen (sometimes Nicolaus; 22 January 1761 – 24 March 1826) was a Danish diplomat and music historian. He is the author of one of the first biographies of composer Wolfgang Amadeus Mozart, still used today as a scholarly source.

== Life ==
Nissen was born in Haderslev, Denmark–Norway. He completed his schooling in 1781 and became "authorized agent of the General Post Office" in Copenhagen in 1781. In 1792 he became a diplomat in the Danish foreign service. As of 1793, he worked in Vienna as chargé d'affaires.

In 1797, while serving in this post, Nissen first met Mozart's widow, Constanze, whose husband had died six years earlier in 1791. He was initially her tenant. The two began living together in September 1798.

Constanze had been through an arduous period following Mozart's death, trying to ward off poverty for herself and her two sons. In this she was successful, obtaining a pension from the Emperor, and making considerable money from concerts of Mozart's music and sale to publishers of his works in manuscript. Nissen came to participate in these labours, taking over much of the work of negotiating with publishers. He also helped care for the children, eventually taking (in Ruth Halliwell's words) "the role of a caring father" in the family.

Nissen and Constanze were married 26 June 1809. The wedding took place in St Martin's Cathedral, Pressburg (today Bratislava), to which the foreign diplomatic corps had temporarily decamped when Napoleon's armies took Vienna. The marriage did not produce any children.

In 1812 the couple moved to Copenhagen, where Nissen took up a post as a censor. They lived there until 1820, at Lavendelstræde 1, a street where many houses of the period are still preserved.

In 1820, Nissen retired, and the couple moved to Salzburg. Nissen had long been planning a biography of Mozart, and the work began seriously in 1823. Nissen benefited greatly when Mozart's elderly older sister Nannerl gave him and Constanze a collection of about 400 Mozart family letters. He worked assiduously to assemble all the biographical material he could, including interviews with people who had known the composer.

Unfortunately, the collection of the material was still in progress when Nissen died on 24 March 1826. Only the incomplete preface can be fully attributed to Nissen. The completion of the work, based on his notes, was left to a medical doctor and Mozart enthusiast living in Pirna, Johann Heinrich Feuerstein (1797–1850). Angermüller and Stafford call Feuerstein "unstable" and Halliwell judges his work thus: "the book was cobbled together in a haphazard fashion from the raw material, and the result was disastrous in terms of quality." Angermüller and Stafford similarly call the work "problematic", adding that "large sections are taken from earlier accounts, often of dubious reliability, and it contains contradictions and errors. The letters it quotes were selected and censored." These authors leave open the question of whether it was Nissen or Feuerstein who is to blame.

The biography was published posthumously in 1829, titled Biographie W. A. Mozart's. Nach Originalbriefen, Sammlungen alles über ihn Geschriebenen, mit vielen neuen Beylagen, Steindrücken, Musikblättern und einem Facsimile.

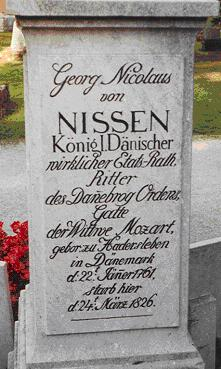
Nissen's tombstone in Salzburg

Nissen died, aged 62, in Salzburg, and was buried there. His tombstone, naming him "The husband of Mozart's widow", can still be visited.

== Nissen's biography of Mozart ==
Nissen's work attempted to achieve a compromise between Niemetschek's and Schlichtegroll's point of view. He attempted to document everything that had been written about Mozart so far and to deliver an accurate description of Mozart's life based on primary sources, namely the letters of the Mozart family. Also, he had a direct witness as a source, his wife Constanze Mozart, who committed Mozart's inheritance to him.

Nissen deserves credit most of all for his efforts to collect all documents concerning Mozart, starting with the Mozart family's letters and including commemorative coins and monuments. Admittedly, he treated the written sources rather generously and edited some passages, especially from Mozart's letters. (For one instance of Nissen's bowdlerizations, see Aloysia Weber.) However, he did so not to deform Mozart's image, but because of "biographical respect". In the foreword to his biography he explains:

There is a need for a lot of selection to extract something attractive and characteristic in the letters, which can be offered to the public, without harming the fame and the esteem of the name-human. ... One desires not to, one must not show one's hero publicly in the way in which he portrayed himself in evenings of familiarity. By all truth, one can harm his fame, his esteem, and the impression of his works.

Later biographers often attempted to revert Nissen's "biographic respect", not because of disrespect for Mozart, but for the sake of scholarly accuracy.

Another possible source of inaccuracy in the biography is Constanze. According to Maynard Solomon, she "had developed an interest in exaggerating Mozart's generosity, poverty, and lack of recognition, and so, in Nissen's biography, she validated many false reports—primarily those originating with [publisher] Friedrich Rochlitz—bearing on such matters, including those alleging that he was taken advantage of by impresarios, publishers, and fellow musicians."
