= Aloysia Weber =

German operatic soprano (c.1760–1839)

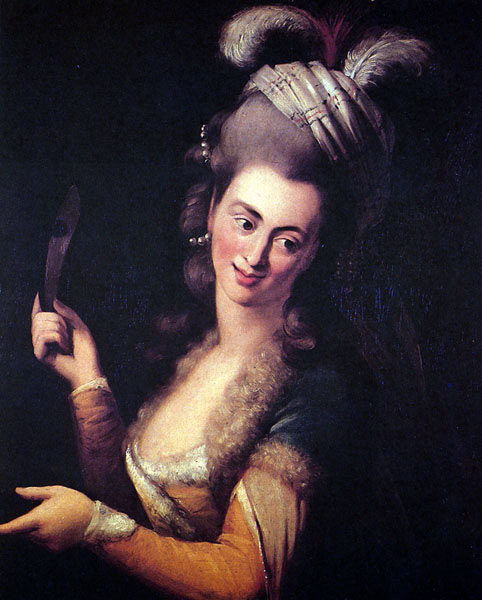
Aloysia Weber as Zémire in André Grétry's opera Zémire et Azor, painting by Johann Baptist von Lampi the Elder

Maria Aloysia Antonia Weber Lange (c. 1760 – 8 June 1839), also known as Aloisia Weber or Aloisia Lange, was a German soprano, remembered primarily for her association with the composer Wolfgang Amadeus Mozart.

== Biography ==
Born in Rheinfelden Aloysia Weber was one of the four daughters of the musical Weber family. Her mother was Cäcilia Weber, née Stamm. Her father, Fridolin Weber, worked as a prompter and music copyist. Her three sisters were soprano Josepha Weber (1758–1819), who premiered the role of the Queen of the Night in Mozart's The Magic Flute; Constanze Weber, the wife of Mozart; and Sophie Weber. Her half-first cousin was the composer Carl Maria von Weber.

Shortly after her birth, the family moved to Mannheim and Aloysia grew up there; she moved to Munich in 1778, where she made her operatic debut. Her salary at the Court Theater was 1000 florins per year; her father made 600. The following year, she was engaged to sing in the National Singspiel in Vienna, a project of the Emperor Joseph II; the family moved together to Vienna in September, where the father worked briefly as a ticket-taker, but he died suddenly only a month after their arrival.

Aloysia continued in a fairly successful singing career in Vienna over the next two decades.

On 31 October 1780, she married Joseph Lange, an actor at the Theater am Kärntnertor who was also an amateur painter (he later produced a well-known portrait of Mozart). It was Lange's second marriage after his first wife had died in 1779. Since Aloysia was the main support of her family at the time, Lange agreed to pay her mother an advance of 900 florins and the sum of 700 florins per year on a continuing basis.

She moved to the Burgtheater in 1782, singing Italian opera. This position lasted only eight months, as she soon became "persona non grata owing to disagreements over salary and role distribution as well as missed performances." She continued to sing, however, at the Kärntnertortheater as well as in occasional roles at the Burgtheater. In 1795, she went on concert tour with her widowed sister Constanze. As of that year, she ceased to live with her husband Lange.

She spent her old age in Salzburg in order to be near her surviving sisters Constanze and Sophie, who had moved there.

== Her relationship with Mozart ==
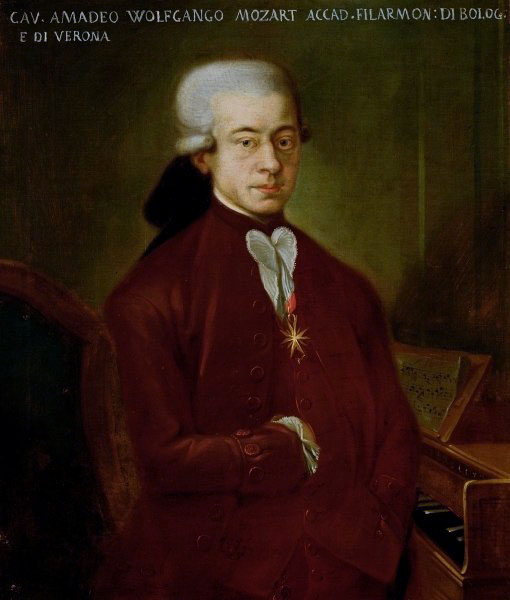
1777 portrait of Mozart

Around 1777, the 21-year-old Wolfgang Amadeus Mozart spent some time in Mannheim, where he had hoped (in vain, it turned out) to find employment. Mozart undertook to teach Aloysia in singing. This is less implausible than it might seem, since according to Mahling, Mozart was himself a trained (former) soprano, instructed in childhood (1764–1765) by a celebrated castrato, Giovanni Manzuoli. Mozart had performed in public as a singer repeatedly up until he was 13, after which perhaps puberty proved a barrier to further performances. Mozart was also an experienced composer of operas, familiar with all aspects of opera production from his journeys to Italy.

At the time of this instruction, Aloysia was already a very advanced pupil. Mozart felt that she already commanded an excellent cantabile style but felt she could use some work on highly virtuosic passages of rapid notes. He wrote to his father:

[Mlle Weber] sings from her heart and most likes singing cantabile. I have brought her through the grand aria to the passages, because it is necessary when she comes to Italy for her to sing bravura arias. She will certainly not forget cantabile, because that is her natural inclination.

To achieve this end, Mozart taught Aloysia to sing a number of arias that included bravura passages, taken from his earlier work in Italy. By Mozart's own account, Aloysia was a very fine pupil, and at the end of the instruction period he wrote a kind of examination piece, the recitative and aria K. 294 "Alcandro, lo confesso/Non sò, d'onde viene". As Mozart wrote to his father:

When I had it ready, I said to Mlle Weber: learn the aria yourself, sing it as you wish; then let me hear it and I will tell you honestly what I like and what I don't like. After two days, I came and she sang it to me, accompanying herself. Then I was obliged to admit that she had sung it exactly as I had wanted it and as I would have taught it to her myself. That is now the best aria she has; with it she certainly brings credit on herself wherever she goes.

In the course of all this instruction Mozart fell in love with Mlle Weber. He expressed a desire to marry her, though it is not clear exactly how serious his intentions were, or whether they were reciprocated.

Mozart left Mannheim for several months for Paris on an unsuccessful job search. On his way back to Salzburg, he passed through Munich, where the increasingly-successful Aloysia was by now employed. According to the tale told in Georg Nikolaus von Nissen's draft biography of Mozart, Mozart and Aloysia had a somewhat unpleasant encounter:

When he entered, she appeared no longer to know him, for whom she previously had wept. Accordingly, he sat down at the piano and sang in a loud voice, "Leck mir das Mensch im Arsch, das mich nicht will" (The one who doesn't want me can lick my arse).

The vulgar phrase in Mozart's song corresponds to the English idiom "kiss my ass", and occurs frequently in Mozart's letters; see Mozart and scatology.

Mozart himself moved to Vienna in 1781, and later that year was for a time a lodger in the Weber home. The father Fridolin had died in 1779, and Aloysia's mother Cäcilia Weber was taking in boarders to make ends meet. Mozart fell in love with the third daughter, Constanze. When the two married in 1782, Mozart became Aloysia's brother-in-law. Apparently there were no long-term hard feelings, as Mozart wrote a fair amount of additional music for Aloysia to sing, listed below.

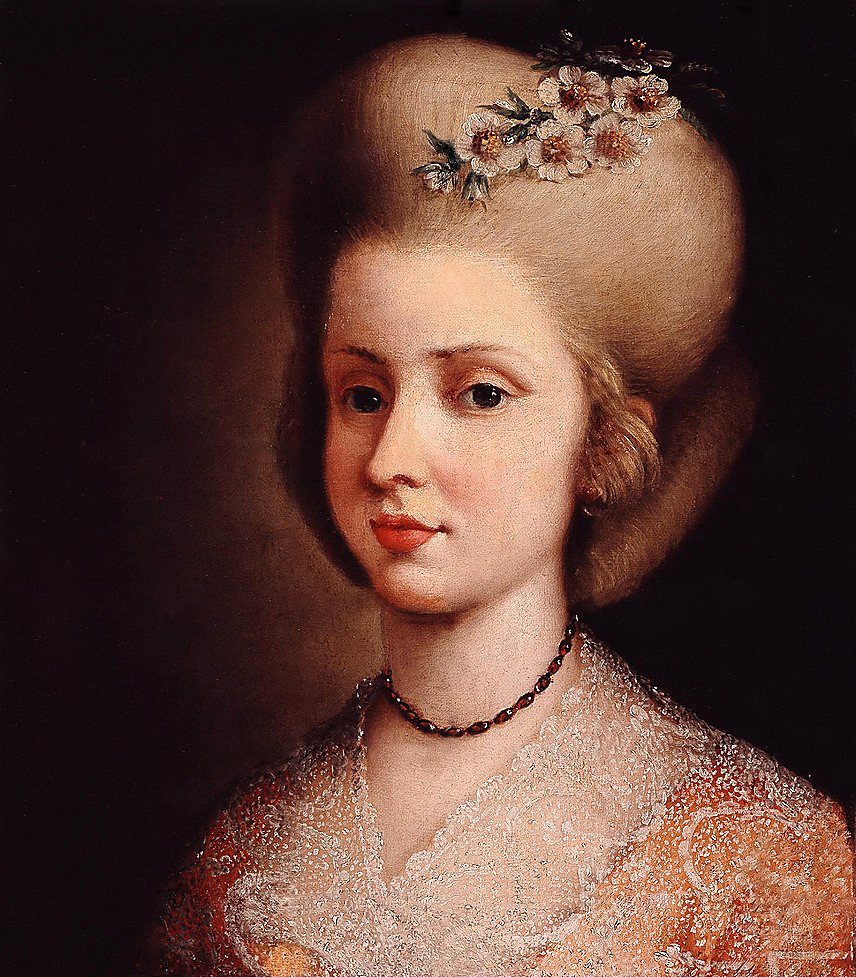
Aloysia Weber; anonymous portrait

=== Music written by Mozart for Aloysia Weber ===
From the Mannheim visit:

- Recitative and Aria for Soprano, "Alcandro, lo confesso", K. 294)
- Recitative and Aria for Soprano, "Popoli di Tessaglia!", K. 316/300b. This has a range up to G_{6}, which earned it a listing in Guinness lists as the highest demanded note in the classical repertoire.

From the Vienna years:

- Aria for Soprano, "Nehmt meinen Dank, ihr holden Gönner!", K. 383
- Scena and rondo "Mia speranza adorata – Ah, non sai, qual pena", K. 416, completed in Vienna 8 January 1783 and premiered by Aloysia on the 11th at a concert in the Mehlgrube, site of the later premiere of many of Mozart's piano concertos.
- Mozart wrote two substitution arias for Aloysia, inserted into a revival production (June 1783) at the Burgtheater of Pasquale Anfossi's opera Il curioso indiscreto. These were "Vorrei spiegarvi, oh Dio!" K. 418 and "No, no, che non sei capace" K. 419.
- The role of Mme. Herz in the short singspiel Der Schauspieldirektor K. 486, consisting of one aria "Da schlägt die Abschiedsstunde", a trio, and the vaudeville finale. This occasional piece was written for an elaborate party given by the Emperor Joseph II in February 1786.
- Aria for Soprano, "Ah se in ciel, benigne stelle", K. 538. This work has an unusual history, which has been worked out using handwriting analysis from Wolfgang Plath and watermark analysis from Alan Tyson. There exists a particella score (voice and bass line only) from 1778, written when Mozart was in love with Aloysia, and a complete score, dedicated to the now-married "Signora Lange", from 1788. Tyson writes (1990:233) "there was no real dishonesty in describing it almost ten years later as "per la Sig^{ra} Lange" -- it was still the same voice, though the singer had changed her name."

=== Mozart opera roles sung by Aloysia Weber ===
- Konstanze, in a revival production of Die Entführung aus dem Serail (1783, 1785, 1789)
- Madame Herz, in Mozart's Der Schauspieldirektor (1786) at the premiere in Vienna
- Donna Anna, in Mozart's Don Giovanni at the Vienna premiere of the work, 7 May 1788
- Sesto, in performances of La clemenza di Tito organized by her sister, Constanze Mozart (29 December 1794, 31 March 1795)

== Assessment ==
Joachim-Daniel Preisler, a Danish actor and musician, was sent on tour by his employer, the Royal Theater in Copenhagen, to study opera production in other European countries. While in Vienna he was invited into the Lange home, where he heard the pregnant (and thus not performing) Aloysia sing. In his diary, he wrote:

The voice is something exceptional! but ... not by a long way as good as our Müller; yet her high range and her delicacy, her execution, taste and theoretical knowledge cannot fail to be admired by any impartial critic. ... She can sing the longest and most difficult parts incomparably better than the [Italian] songstresses who are here pampered by the "Viennese nobility".

Preisler's testimony also indicates that Aloysia was not just a fine singer, but an outstanding general musician:

The well-known Mozardt is her brother-in-law, and has taught her so well that she accompanies from a score and plays interludes like a Kapellmeister.

== In fiction ==
Mozart's and Aloysia's ill-fated romance is novelized in Mozart's Wife by Juliet Waldron (Hard Shell Books, 2000). A somewhat more fanciful portrayal is given in Marrying Mozart by Stephanie Cowell (New York: Penguin, 2004).

== Sources ==
- Antonicek, [Theophil] (1969). "Lange, Aloysia (Louise) Maria Antonia; geb. Weber (1758–1839), Sängerin". Österreichisches Biographisches Lexikon ab 1815 (online) (in German). Vol. 4. Austrian Academy of Sciences. p. 446.
- Deutsch, Erich Otto (1966). Mozart: A Documentary Biography. Translated by Eric Blom; Peter Branscombe; Jeremy Noble (2nd ed.). Stanford, California: Stanford University Press.
- Einstein, Alfred (1962). Mozart: His Character, His Work. Oxford University Press. ISBN 978-0-19-500732-9.
- Eisen, Cliff; Sadie, Stanley (2001). "Mozart, (Johann Chrysostom) Wolfgang Amadeus". Grove Music Online (8th ed.). Oxford University Press. doi:10.1093/gmo/9781561592630.article.6002278233. ISBN 978-1-56159-263-0. (subscription, Wikilibrary access, or UK public library membership required)
- Lewy Gidwitz, Patricia (2001). "Weber [Lange], (Maria) Aloysia (Louise Antonia)". Grove Music Online (8th ed.). Oxford University Press. doi:10.1093/omo/9781561592630.013.90000380415. ISBN 978-1-56159-263-0. (subscription, Wikilibrary access, or UK public library membership required)
- Mahling, Christoph-Hellmut (1996). "Junia's aria in Lucio Silla". In Stanley Sadie (ed.). Wolfgang Amadè Mozart: Essays on His Life and Music. Oxford: Clarendon Press.
- Pohl, Carl Ferdinand (1900). "Mozart, Wolfgang" . A Dictionary of Music and Musicians. Vol. 2. pp. 379–406.
- Solomon, Maynard (1995). Mozart: A Life. New York: Harper Collins. ISBN 0-06-019046-9.
- Tyson, Alan (1987) Mozart: Studies of the Autograph Scores. Cambridge, MA: Harvard University Press.
