= Constanze Mozart =

Wife of Wolfgang Amadeus Mozart (1762–1842)

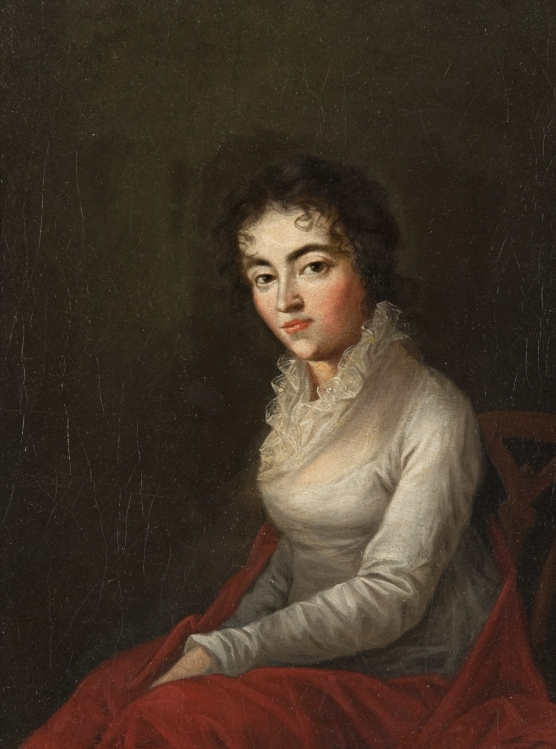
- Portrait by Joseph Lange c. 1782
- Born: Maria Constanze Cäcilia Josepha Johanna Aloysia Weber; 5 January 1762; Zell im Wiesental, Further Austria, Holy Roman Empire
- Died: 6 March 1842 (aged 80); Salzburg, Upper Austria, Austrian Empire
- Occupations: Soprano; businesswoman
- Spouses: Wolfgang Amadeus Mozart (m. 1782; d. 1791) Georg Nikolaus von Nissen (m. 1809; d. 1826)
- Children: 6, including Karl Thomas and Franz Xaver Wolfgang
- Parents: Franz Fridolin Weber (father); Cäcilia Stamm (mother)
- Relatives: Aloysia Weber (sister); Josepha Weber (sister); Sophie Weber (sister); Carl Maria Von Weber (cousin)

Maria Constanze Cäcilia Josepha Johanna Aloysia Mozart (née Weber, Austrian German: [kɔnˈstantsə ˈmoːtsart ˈveːbɐ]; 5 January 1762 – 6 March 1842) was an Austrian soprano, later a businesswoman. She is best remembered as the wife of the composer Wolfgang Amadeus Mozart, who from the evidence of his letters was deeply in love with her throughout their nine-year marriage. Following her husband's sudden death in 1791, Constanze Mozart escaped poverty and supported her family through concertizing and promotion of her husband's memory; she was responsible in part for the extensive posthumous publication of her husband's works. Constanze is also regarded, less positively, as a source of mythology concerning her husband's life, deriving in part from the biography she jointly wrote with her second husband, Georg Nikolaus von Nissen.

== Early life ==
Constanze Weber was born on 5 January 1762 in Zell im Wiesental, a town near Lörrach (in present-day Baden-Württemberg, southwest Germany), then a Further Austrian territory in the Holy Roman Empire. Her mother was Cäcilia Weber (née Stamm), and her father, Fridolin Weber, worked as a "double bass player, prompter, and music copyist". Fridolin's half-brother was the father of composer Carl Maria von Weber. Constanze had two elder sisters, Josepha and Aloysia, and a younger sister, Sophie. All four were trained as singers and Josepha and Aloysia both went on to distinguished musical careers, later on performing in the premieres of a number of Mozart's works.

During most of Constanze's upbringing, the family lived in her mother's hometown of Mannheim, an important cultural, intellectual and musical center. The 21-year-old Mozart visited Mannheim in 1777 on a job-hunting tour with his mother and developed a close relationship with the Weber family. He fell in love—not with 15-year-old Constanze, but with Aloysia. While Mozart was in Paris, Aloysia obtained a position as a singer in Munich, and the family accompanied her there. She rejected Mozart when he passed through Munich on his way back to Salzburg.

The family moved to Vienna in 1779, again following Aloysia as she pursued her career. However, a month after their arrival, Fridolin died. By the time Mozart moved to Vienna in 1781, Aloysia had married Joseph Lange, who agreed to help Cäcilia Weber with an annual stipend; she also took in boarders to make ends meet. The house where the Webers lived (on the second floor) was at Am Peter 11, and bore a name (as houses often did at the time): Zum Auge Gottes ("God's Eye").

== Marriage to Mozart ==
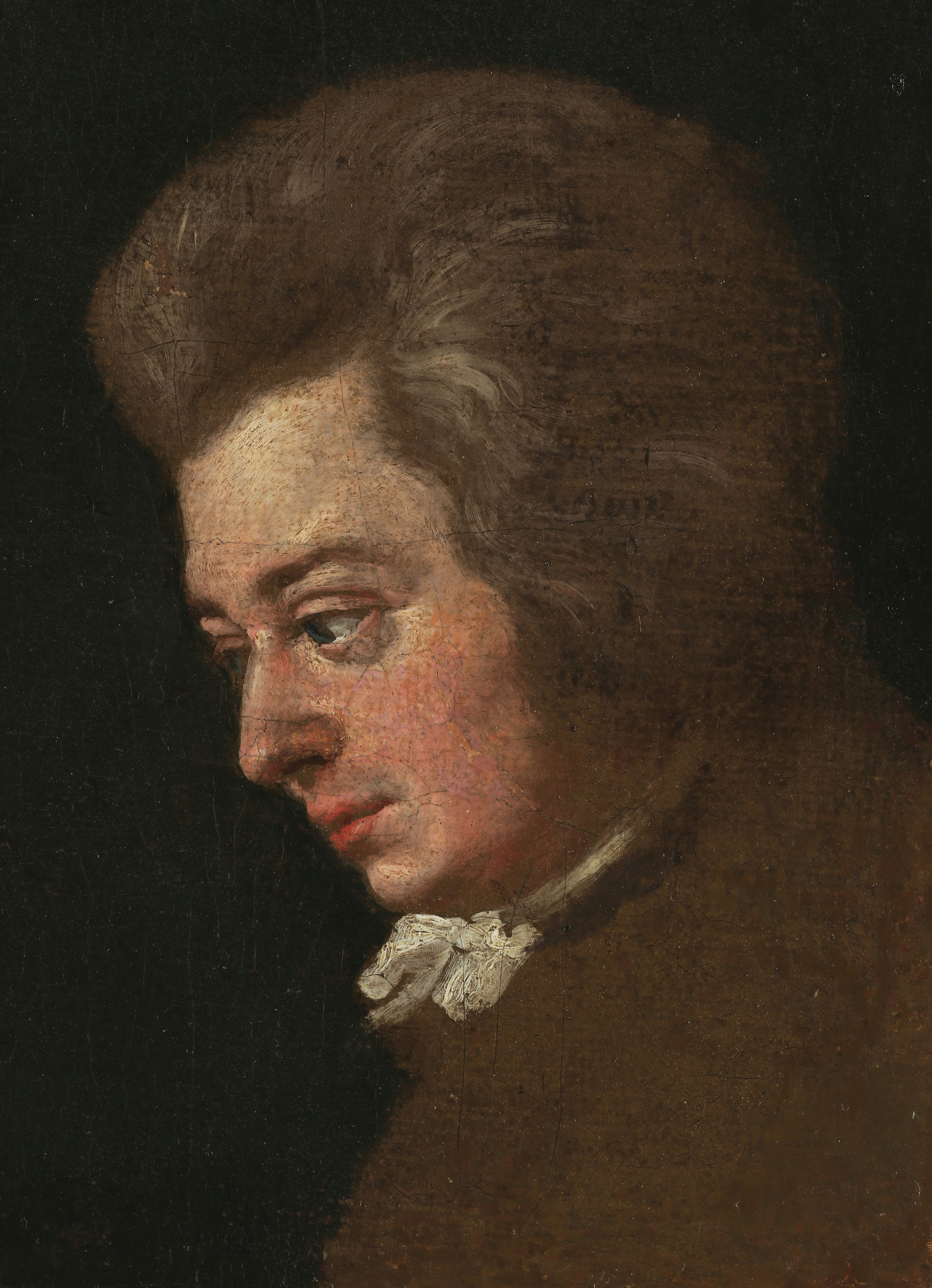
Detail of Lange's 1782–83 Mozart portrait

On first arriving in Vienna on 16 March 1781, Mozart stayed at the house of the Teutonic Order with the staff of his patron, Archbishop Colloredo. In May, he "was obliged to leave", and chose to board in the Weber household, originally intending "to stay there only a week".

After a while, it became apparent to Cäcilia Weber that Mozart was courting Constanze, now 19, and in the interest of propriety, she requested that he leave. Mozart moved out on 5 September to a third-floor room in the Graben.

The courtship continued, but not entirely smoothly. Surviving correspondence indicates that Mozart and Constanze briefly broke up in April 1782, over an episode involving jealousy (Constanze had permitted another young man to measure her calves in a parlor game). Mozart also faced a very difficult task getting permission for the marriage from his father, Leopold.

The marriage finally took place in an atmosphere of crisis. Daniel Heartz suggests that eventually Constanze moved in with Mozart, which would have placed her in disgrace by the mores of the time. Mozart wrote to Leopold on 31 July 1782, "All the good and well-intentioned advice you have sent fails to address the case of a man who has already gone so far with a maiden. Further postponement is out of the question." Heartz relates, "Constanze's sister Sophie had tearfully declared that her mother would send the police after Constanze if she did not return home [presumably from Mozart's apartment]." On 4 August, Mozart wrote to Baroness von Waldstätten, asking: "Can the police here enter anyone's house in this way? Perhaps it is only a ruse of Madame Weber to get her daughter back. If not, I know no better remedy than to marry Constanze tomorrow morning or if possible today."

The marriage did indeed take place that day, 4 August 1782, in a side chapel of St. Stephen's Cathedral. In the marriage contract, Constanze "assigns to her bridegroom five hundred gulden which [...] the latter has promised to augment with one thousand gulden", with the total "to pass to the survivor". Further, all joint acquisitions during the marriage were to remain the common property of both. A day after the marriage took place, the consent of Wolfgang's father arrived in the mail.

Constanze gave birth to six children in eight years, but only two of them survived infancy:

1. Raimund Leopold (17 June 1783 – 19 August 1783)
2. Karl Thomas Mozart (21 September 1784 – 31 October 1858)
3. Johann Thomas Leopold (18 October 1786 – 15 November 1786)
4. Theresia Constanzia Adelheid Friedericke Maria Anna (27 December 1787 – 29 June 1788)
5. Anna Maria (died soon after birth, 16 November 1789)
6. Franz Xaver Wolfgang Mozart (26 July 1791 – 29 July 1844)

=== Happiness of their marriage ===
During his trips to other cities, and during Constanze's trips to nearby Baden for medical treatment, the couple exchanged letters, of which a number of Mozart's survive. The letters are unfailingly affectionate, often intensely so; and at times they can also be solicitous, supervisory, erotic, or silly; the general sense they give is of a happy marriage.

A letter written from Dresden on 16 April 1789 gives instances of both "supervisory" and "silly". Mozart gives Constanze a six-item list of requests, including "don't be sad", "take care of your health", and "be assured of my love"; "don't go out walking by yourself -- but best of all don't go out walking at all." He concludes: "I kiss you and squeeze you 1095060437082 times; this will help you to practice your pronunciation."

A passage both silly and erotic was written on the same journey, from Berlin on 23 May 1789, as Mozart was anticipating his homeward journey:

On June 1st I'll sleep in Prague, and on the 4th -- the 4th? -- I'll be sleeping with my dear little wife;--Spruce up your sweet little nest because my little rascal here really deserves it, he has been very well behaved but now he's itching to possess your sweet [word erased]. Just imagine that little sneak, while I am writing he has secretly crept up on the table and now looks at me questioningly; but I, without much ado, give him a little slap--but now he is even more [word erased]; well, he is almost out of control, the scoundrel.

No letters from Constanze to Wolfgang appear to have survived. However, in her old age she remembered her marriage to Mozart (as well as her later marriage to Nissen) as very happy; she wrote in a letter to a music teacher named Friedrich Schwaan (5 December 1829): "I have had two most excellent husbands by whom I was loved and honoured – even, I have to say, adored; they, too were both equally loved by me with the utmost tenderness, thus I was twice completely happy.”

== After Mozart's death ==
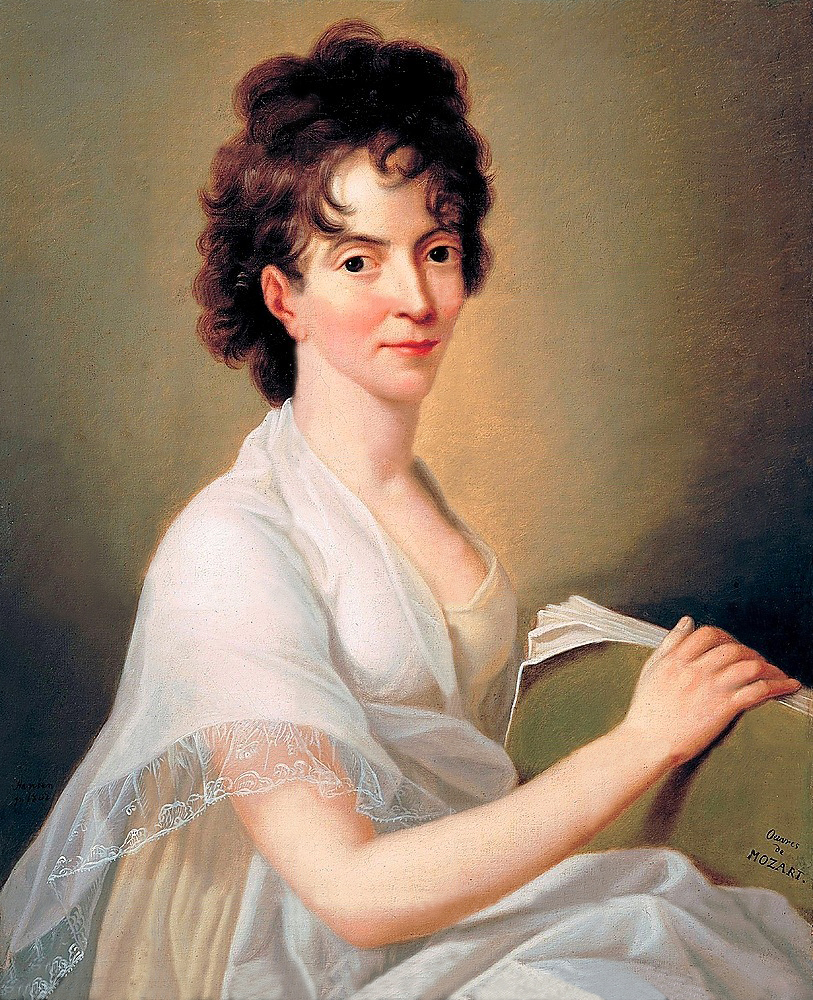
Constanze in 1802, portrait by Hans Hansen

Mozart died in 1791, leaving debts and placing Constanze in a difficult position. At this point Constanze's business skills came into fruition: she obtained a pension from the emperor, organized profitable memorial concerts, and embarked on a campaign to publish the works of her late husband. These efforts gradually made Constanze financially secure and ultimately wealthy. She sent Karl and Franz to Prague to be educated by Franz Xaver Niemetschek, with whom she collaborated on the first full-length biography of Mozart.

Among Constanze's musical accomplishments in the years after Mozart's death was her promulgation of his late opera La Clemenza di Tito, which had been prepared for performance in Prague in 1791. She mounted a benefit performance on 29 December 1794 at the Kärntnertortheater in Vienna, with her sister Aloysia Weber taking the role of Sextus. Further performances followed, both in Vienna and other cities, in which Constanze herself sang, taking the role of Vitellia.

Toward the end of 1797, she met Georg Nikolaus von Nissen, a Danish diplomat and writer who, initially, was her tenant. The two began living together in September 1798. In 1809 they traveled to Pressburg (today's Bratislava), at the time in Hungary, in order to be married legally (Nissen was Protestant, Constanze a Catholic, a barrier to marriage at the time in Austria). From 1810 to 1820, they lived in Copenhagen, and subsequently travelled throughout Europe, especially Germany and Italy. They settled in Salzburg in 1824. Both worked on a biography of Mozart; Constanze eventually published it in 1828, two years after her second husband's death.

During Constanze's last years in Salzburg, she had the company of her two surviving sisters, Aloysia and Sophie, also widows, who moved to Salzburg and lived out their lives there.

== Influences on Mozart's music ==
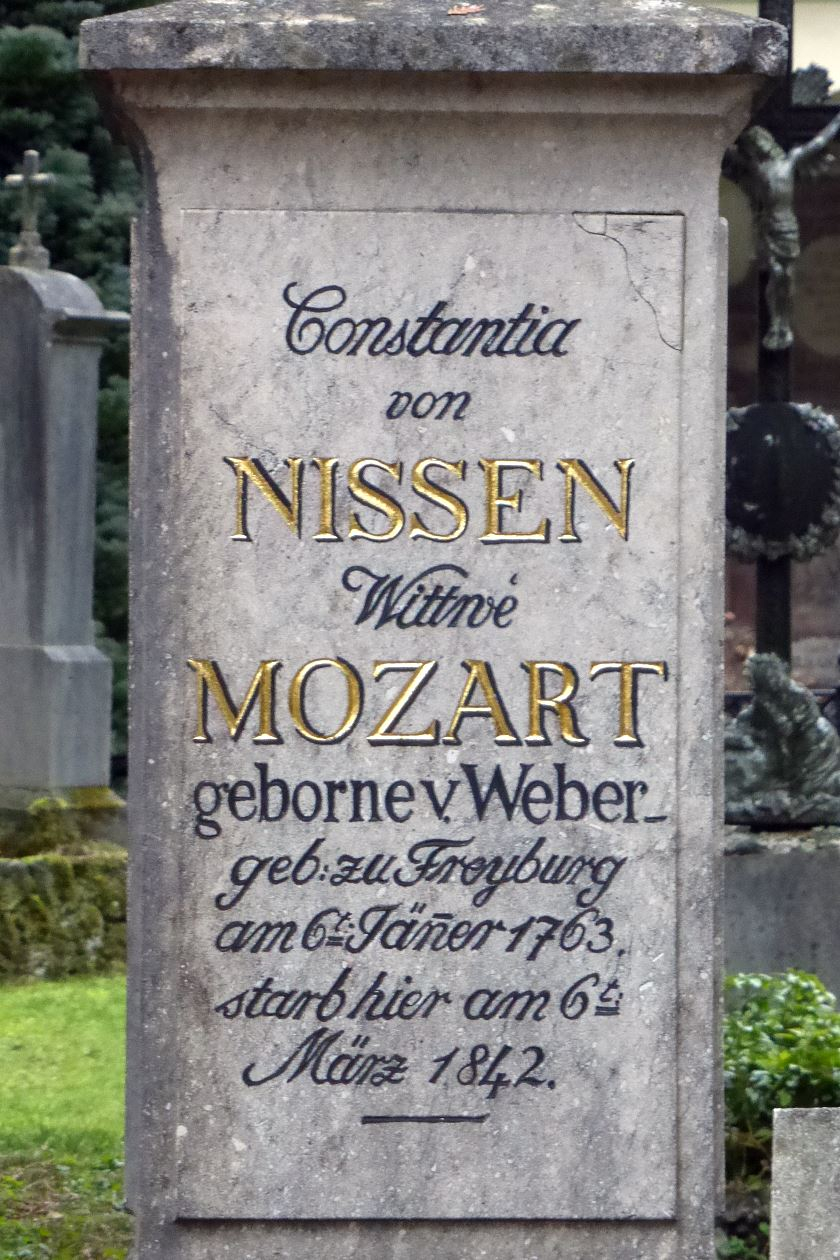
Tombstone of Constanze Mozart, cemetery of Sebastian Church, Salzburg

Alongside raising their children and increasingly managing tours and other business affairs, Constanze often worked closely with Wolfgang as he composed. Drawing on her extensive musical training and sight-reading abilities, he often asked her to sing through his musical sketches and to give her opinion, particularly on the soprano roles in his operas. Mozart greatly appreciated this demanding work by his wife.

The extraordinary writing for soprano solo in the Great Mass in C minor (for example, in the "Christe eleison" section of the Kyrie movement, or the aria "Et incarnatus est") was intended for Constanze, who sang in the 1783 premiere of this work in Salzburg. Maynard Solomon, in his Mozart biography, speculatively describes the work as a love offering.

During the period of the couple's courtship, Mozart began making visits to Baron Gottfried van Swieten, who let him examine his extensive collection of manuscripts of works by Bach and Handel. Mozart was excited by this material, and a number of compositions show its influence on his own works. An important impetus was Constanze, who apparently had fallen in love with Baroque counterpoint. This is known from a letter Mozart wrote to his sister Nannerl on 20 April 1782. The letter was accompanied by a manuscript copy of the composer's Fantasy and Fugue, K. 394:

I composed the fugue first and wrote it down while I was thinking out the prelude. I only hope that you will be able to read it, for it is written so very small; and I hope further that you will like it. Another time I shall send you something better for the clavier. My dear Constanze is really the cause of this fugue's coming into the world. Baron van Swieten, to whom I go every Sunday, gave me all the works of Händel and Sebastian Bach to take home with me (after I had played them to him). When Constanze heard the fugues, she absolutely fell in love with them. Now she will listen to nothing but fugues, and particularly (in this kind of composition) the works of Händel and Bach. Well, as she has often heard me play fugues out of my head, she asked me if I had ever written any down, and when I said I had not, she scolded me roundly for not recording some of my compositions in this most artistically beautiful of all musical forms and never ceased to entreat me until I wrote down a fugue for her.

In the same letter, Mozart briefly mentions Constanze at the beginning, telling his sister that Constanze urged him to write this letter to her:

My dear Konstanze has finally summoned the courage to follow the impulse of her good heart – namely to write to you, my dear sister. – If you will honour her |: and indeed I hope you will, so that I can read her pleasure over it on the brow of this good creature – :| if you will honour her with an answer, I would ask you to send your letter to me as an enclosure. – I write this only as a precaution so that you know that her mother and her sisters know nothing about her writing to you. –

It goes on at the very end, with a response from Constanze, writing to Nannerl.

Most esteemed and most precious friend! I would never have been so bold as to write forthrightly to you, most esteemed friend, of my inclinations and longings or [50] to place them in your hands, had not your esteemed brother assured me that you would not take umbrage at this step, which happens out of too great a desire to converse, at least in writing, with a person who, although unknown to me, is yet most valuable to me because of the name Mozart. – [55] Should you become angry if I am so bold as to say to you that you are precious and – beloved – to me above all else, madam, for no other reason than your being the sister of a brother so worthy of you, and if I dare – to ask you for your friendship: – without being proud, I may say that I half deserve it, and wholly deserving – is what I shall strive to become! – [60] May I offer you mine |: which I have already long since given to you secretly, madam, in my heart :| in return? – Oh, I indeed hope so! – and in this hope I remain, Esteemed and precious friend, your most obedient servant and friend, Constanza Weber

== Treatment by biographers ==
According to the Grove Dictionary of Music and Musicians, Constanze has been treated harshly and unfairly by a number of her biographers: "Early 20th-century scholarship severely criticized her as unintelligent, unmusical and even unfaithful, and as a neglectful and unworthy wife to Mozart. Such assessments (still current) were based on no good evidence, were tainted with anti-feminism and were probably wrong on all counts." Complaints about unfairness to Constanze also appear in modern Mozart biographies by Braunbehrens (1990), Solomon (1995), and Halliwell (1998).

== Alleged photograph ==
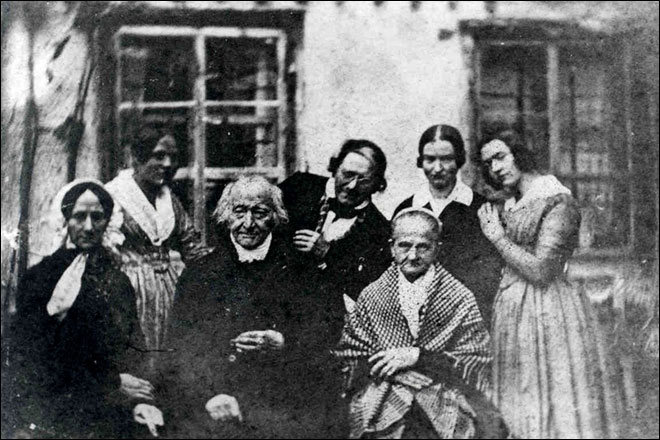
1840 daguerreotype supposedly showing Constanze Mozart (see text for serious doubts), front left; Bavarian composer Max Keller centre front; to his left his wife, Josefa; left to right at the rear are the family cook; Keller's brother in law Philip Lattner; and Keller's daughters, Luise and Josefa.

A photograph (daguerreotype), first brought to scholarly attention in 1958, has been claimed to show Constanze (Mozart) Nissen aged 78, two years before her death. The photo was supposedly taken in Altötting, Bavaria in October 1840 outside the home of composer Max Keller. Several Mozart scholars have rebutted this claim. First, the photograph could not have been taken outdoors, since the lenses required to produce such images were not invented by Joseph Petzval until after Constanze had died in 1842. Second, it is documented that Constanze was crippled from debilitating arthritis in her final years of life. Her biographer Agnes Selby suggested "There is absolutely no way she could have traveled to visit Maximillian Keller during the period when the photograph was taken. Contrary to the statements made in the newspaper, Constanze had no contact with Keller since 1826." Third, author and historian Sean Munger noted that Constanze would have been 78 years of age in 1840 and does not look that old in the picture.

== Legacy ==
The Royal Conservatory of Brussels conserves several autograph documents from Constanze Mozart, including letters to her son Franz Xaver Wolfgang Mozart, as well as a small illustrated Album de Souvenirs, dated 1789 but covering the 1801–1823 period in which she collects memories, impressions and poems.

== See also ==
- Biographies of Mozart – for Constanze's possible role in launching a variety of biographical myths about her first husband
- Johann Traeg – Cliff Eisen's conjecture for how Constanze quickly addressed her financial situation after her husband's death through a quick sale of manuscripts to this local dealer
