= Mozart (disambiguation) =

Wolfgang Amadeus Mozart (1756–1791) was a composer during the Classical period.

Mozart may also refer to:

== People ==
=== Family of Wolfgang Amadeus Mozart ===
- Mozart family, Wolfgang Amadeus Mozart's family
  - Franz Mozart (1649–1694), Wolfgang's paternal great-grandfather
  - Johann Georg Mozart (1679–1736), Wolfgang's paternal grandfather
  - Leopold Mozart (1719–1787), Wolfgang's father
  - Anna Maria Mozart née Pertl (1720–1778), Wolfgang's mother
  - Maria Anna Mozart (1751–1829), Wolfgang's sister ("Nannerl")
  - Maria Anna Thekla Mozart (1758–1841), Wolfgang's cousin ("Bäsle")
  - Constanze Mozart (1762–1842), Wolfgang's wife
  - Karl Thomas Mozart (1784–1858), Wolfgang's and Constanze's elder surviving son
  - Franz Xaver Wolfgang Mozart (1791–1844), Wolfgang's and Constanze's youngest child, composer and pianist

=== Others ===
- Mozart Santos Batista Júnior (born 1979), Brazilian footballer
- Mozart Camargo Guarnieri (1907–1993), Brazilian composer
- Marc Mozart, German songwriter and record producer, member of Mozart & Friends
- Amadeus Mozart, one half of the UK Hard House duo Tidy Boys

== Places ==
- Mozart, Saskatchewan, Canada, a small hamlet
- Mozart, West Virginia, United States, an unincorporated community
- Mozart (crater), a crater on Mercury

== Arts and entertainment ==
=== Films ===
- Mozart (1936 film), a British film about the composer
- Mozart (1955 film), an Austrian film about the composer

=== Musicals ===
- Mozart (comédie musicale), 1925 musical comedy by Reynaldo Hahn and Sacha Guitry
- Mozart!, Austrian musical about the composer
- Mozart, l'opéra rock, 2008 French musical directed by Olivier Dahan

=== Other arts and entertainment ===
- Mozart, a meerkat in Meerkat Manor
- MozART group, a music-comic performance group

== Computing and technology ==
- HTC 7 Mozart, a mobile smartphone
- Mozart the music processor, a music notation program
- Mozart Programming System, a multiplatform implementation of the Oz programming language

== Transport ==
- Mozart (train), a train service named after the composer
- Mozart (plane), name of the Lauda Air Flight 004 Boeing 767 that crashed in 1991

== Other uses ==
- Mozart (horse), a racehorse
- MOZART (model), chemical transport model of atmospheric ozone
- Mozart Group, defunct private military corporation

== See also ==
- Mozart effect, a theory that listening to Mozart's music can enhance intellect
- Mozartkugeln, a chocolate made to honor Mozart, popular in Austria
- Juan Crisóstomo Arriaga (1806–1826), composer called the "Spanish Mozart"
- François-Adrien Boieldieu (1775–1834), composer called the "French Mozart"
- Joseph Martin Kraus (1756–1792), composer called the "Swedish Mozart"
- Jacques Offenbach (1819–1880), composer called the "Mozart of the Champs-Élysées"
- A. R. Rahman (born 1966), composer called the "Mozart of Madras"
- Gioachino Rossini (1792–1868), composer called the "Italian Mozart"
- Chevalier de Saint-Georges (1745–1799), composer from Guadeloupe called the "Black Mozart"
- Vicente Martín y Soler (1754–1806), composer called the "Valencian Mozart"
- Samuel Wesley (composer, born 1766) (1766–1837), composer called the "English Mozart"
