= Mozart family =

Austrian musical family

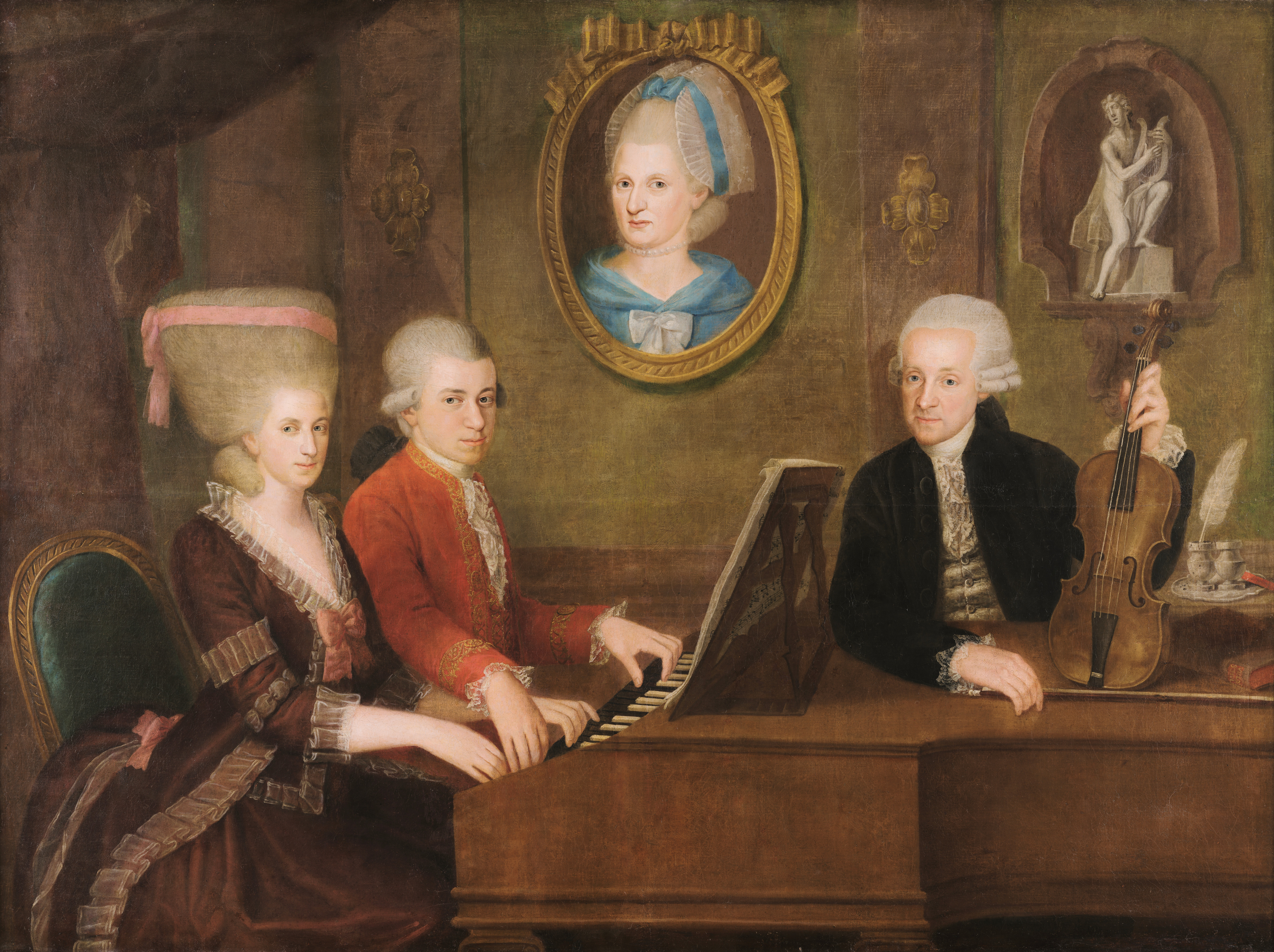
Portrait of the Mozart Family, c. 1780: Wolfgang Amadeus Mozart with his sister Maria Anna playing their piano and their father Johnann Georg Leopold holding his violin, on the wall a portrait of his dead mother Anna Maria

The Mozart family were the ancestors, relatives, and descendants of Wolfgang Amadeus Mozart. The earliest documents mentioning the name "Mozart", then spelled "Motzhart" or "Motzhardt", are from the Bavarian part of Swabia. The direct bloodline ended when Mozart's last surviving son, Karl Thomas Mozart, died on October 31, 1858, without children.

== Mozart family ==
    - Heinrich Motzhardt (circa 1320/1350–1400)
      - Andris Motzhardt (1380–1485)
        - Hans Motzhardt (1470–1560)
          - David Motzhardt (1540–1625/1626), farmer in Pfersee, today a suburb of Augsburg
            - David Mozart (1620–1628 January 1685). "he came to Augsburg from the nearby village of Pfersee and was granted citizenship and the right to trade as a mason." He built the tower of the church in Dillingen an der Donau; On 25 January 1643 he married Maria Negeler (1622–1697) from Lechhausen.
              - Daniel Mozart (1645–1683)
              - Hans Georg Mozart (1647–1719), bricklayer and master builder, guild master, built the provost's church St Georg in Augsburg, collaborated at the Fugger residence
              - Franz Mozart (1649–1693/1694), master mason and Mozart's great-grandfather.
                - Johann Georg Mozart (1679–1736), Mozart's paternal grandfather. bookbinder in Augsburg, married (i) in 1708, Anna Maria Banegger, a widow, née Peter; no children; (ii) on 16 May 1718, Anna Maria Sulzer (1696–1766), "the daughter of a master weaver who later settled in Augsburg."
                - Wolfgang Nikolaus Pertl (1667–1724) married Eva Rosina Barbara Pertl née Altman (1681–1750) (Anna Maria’s parents)
                  - Johann Georg Leopold Mozart (1719–1787), court musician, violin pedagogue; Mozart's father and teacher. Known in general as Leopold Mozart. Married Anna Maria Walburg Mozart née Pertl (1720–1778)
                    - Johann Leopold Joachim Mozart (1748–1749)
                    - Maria Anna Cordula Mozart (1749–1749)
                    - Maria Anna Nepomucena Walpurgis Mozart (1750–1750)
                    - Maria Anna Berchtold zu Sonnenberg née Mozart (called "Nannerl") (1751–1829) married Johann Baptist Franz Berchtold zu Sonnenburg (1736–1801)
                      - Leopold Alois Pantaleon Berchtold zu Sonnenburg (1785–1840), married Josephine Fuggs (1795-?)
                        - Henriette Forschter née Bechtold zu Sonnenburg (1817–1890), married Franz Forschter (1806–1871)
                          - Gustav Forschter (1841–1875)
                          - Bertha Forschter (1842–1919)
                        - Cäsar August Ernst von Bechtold zu Sonnenburg (1822–1822)
                        - Jeanette von Berchtold zu Sonnenburg (1789–1805)
                        - Maria Babette von Berchtold zu Sonnenburg (1790–1791)
                    - Johann Karl Amadeus Mozart (1752–1753)
                    - Maria Crescentia Francisca de Paula Mozart (1754–1754)
                    - Wolfgang Amadeus Mozart (1756–1791), born Joannes Chrysostomus Wolfgang Theophilus Mozart, composer, married Maria Constanze Cäcillia Josepha Johnanna Aloysia Mozart née Weber, called Constanze (1762–1842)
                      - Raimund Leopold Mozart (1783–1783)
                      - Karl Thomas Mozart (1784–1858), official in the service of the Viceroy of Naples in Milan; unmarried and childless
                      - Johann Thomas Leopold Mozart (1786–1786)
                      - Theresia Constanzia Adelheid Fridericke Maria Anna Mozart (1787–1788)
                      - Anna Maria Mozart (1789–1789)
                      - Franz Xaver Wolfgang Mozart (1791–1844), composer and teacher; unmarried and childless
                  - Johann Christian Mozart (1721–1722)
                  - Johann Christian Mozart (1722–1755)
                  - Joseph Ignaz Mozart (1725–1796)
                  - Franz Alois Mozart (1727–1791), bookbinder in Augsburg, married Maria Victoria Eschenbach
                    - Maria Anna Thekla Mozart ("Bäsle") (1758–1841)
                      - Maria Josepha Berbier (1784–1842), married Franz Joseph Streitel
                        - Carl Joseph Streitel (c. 1803), died in infancy
                  - Maria Eleonora Mozart (1729–1806)
                  - Marie Dorothea Mozart (1731–1751)
                  - Theresia Franziska Mozart (1734–1800)
                  - Lorenz Anton Mozart (1735–1736)
                - Franz Mozart (sculptor) (1681–1732)
              - Maria Mozart (1652–1697)
              - David Mozart (1653–1710), a Conventual Franciscan
              - Johann Michael Mozart (1655–1718), sculptor
              - Anna Maria Mozart (1657–1725)
              - Catgarina Mozart (1659–1704)
          - Jerg Motzhart (brother of David Motzhardt Junior)

== Weber family ==
The Weber family became connected with the Mozart family through the marriage of Wolfgang Amadeus to Constanze. The family were from Zell im Wiesental, Germany and included:

- Hans Georg Weber (1650–1734)
  - Fridolin Weber (1691–1754), married Maria Eva Schlar
    - Franz Fridolin Weber (1733–1779), married Maria Cäcillia Cordula Weber née Stamm
      - Josepha Weber (1758–1819), soprano, married (i) Franz de Paula Hofer (1755–96) (ii) Sebastian Mayer (1773–1835) (uncle of Carl Maria Von Weber)
      - Aloysia Weber (c. 1760–1839), soprano, married Joseph Lange (1751–1831)
      - Maria Constanze Cäcillia Josepha Johnanna Aloysia Mozart von Nissen née Weber (1762–1842), marriage to (i) Wolfgang Amadeus Mozart, composer (1756–1791) (ii) Georg Nikolaus von Nissen, historian (1761–1826)
      - six children by Wolfgang Amadeus Mozart as above
      - Sophie Weber (1763–1846), singer, married Jakob Haibel (1762–1826)
  - Franz Anton Weber (1734–1812)
    - Carl Maria von Weber (1786–1826), composer
      - Max Maria von Weber (1822–1881), German civil engineer
        - Carl Maria von Weber Junior (1849–1897)
        - Maria Karoline von Wildenbruch (1843–1920), spouse of German poet and dramatist Ernst von Wildenbruch (1849–1909)

== Gallery ==
Leopold Mozart, his wife and children

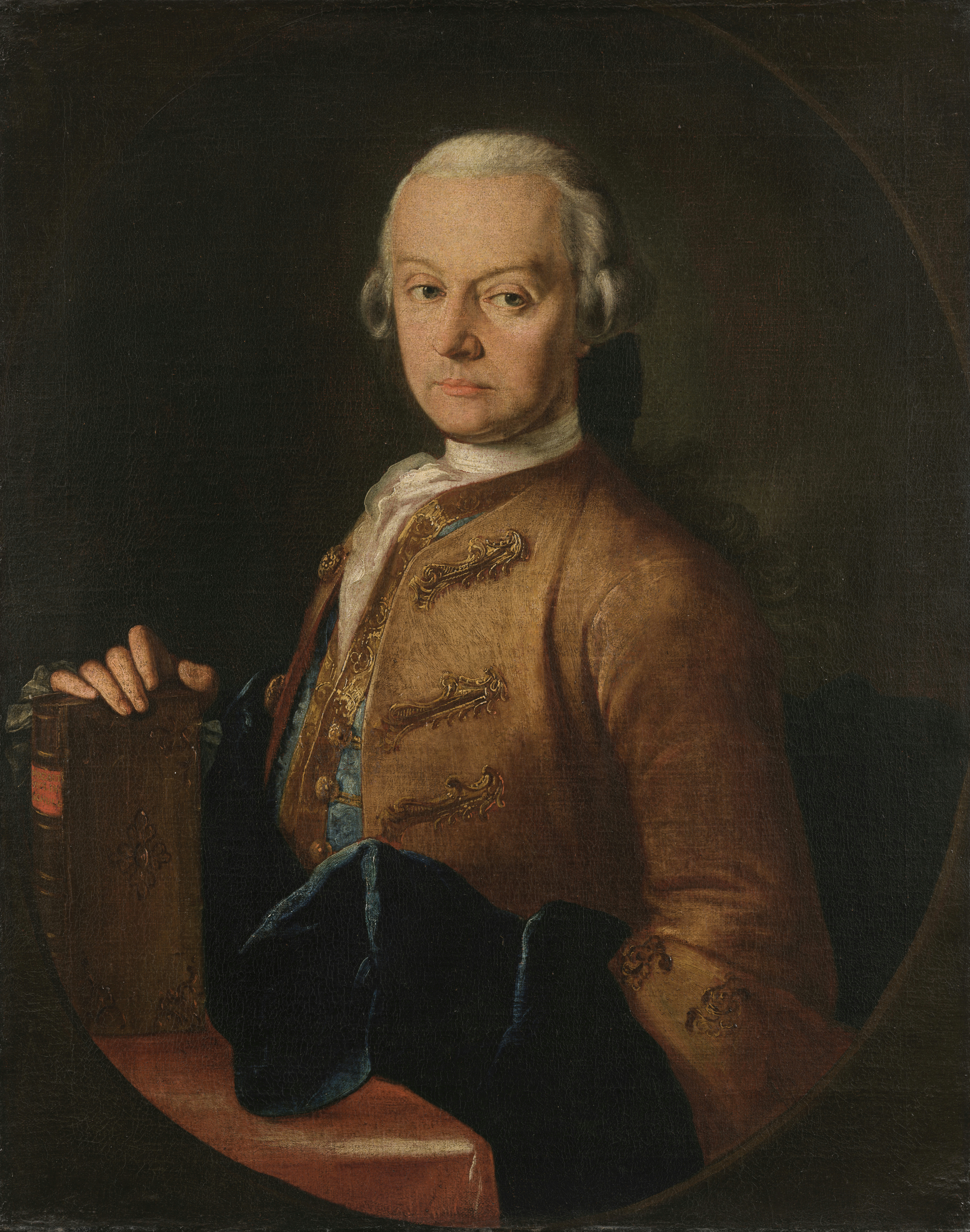
Leopold Mozart, c. 1765

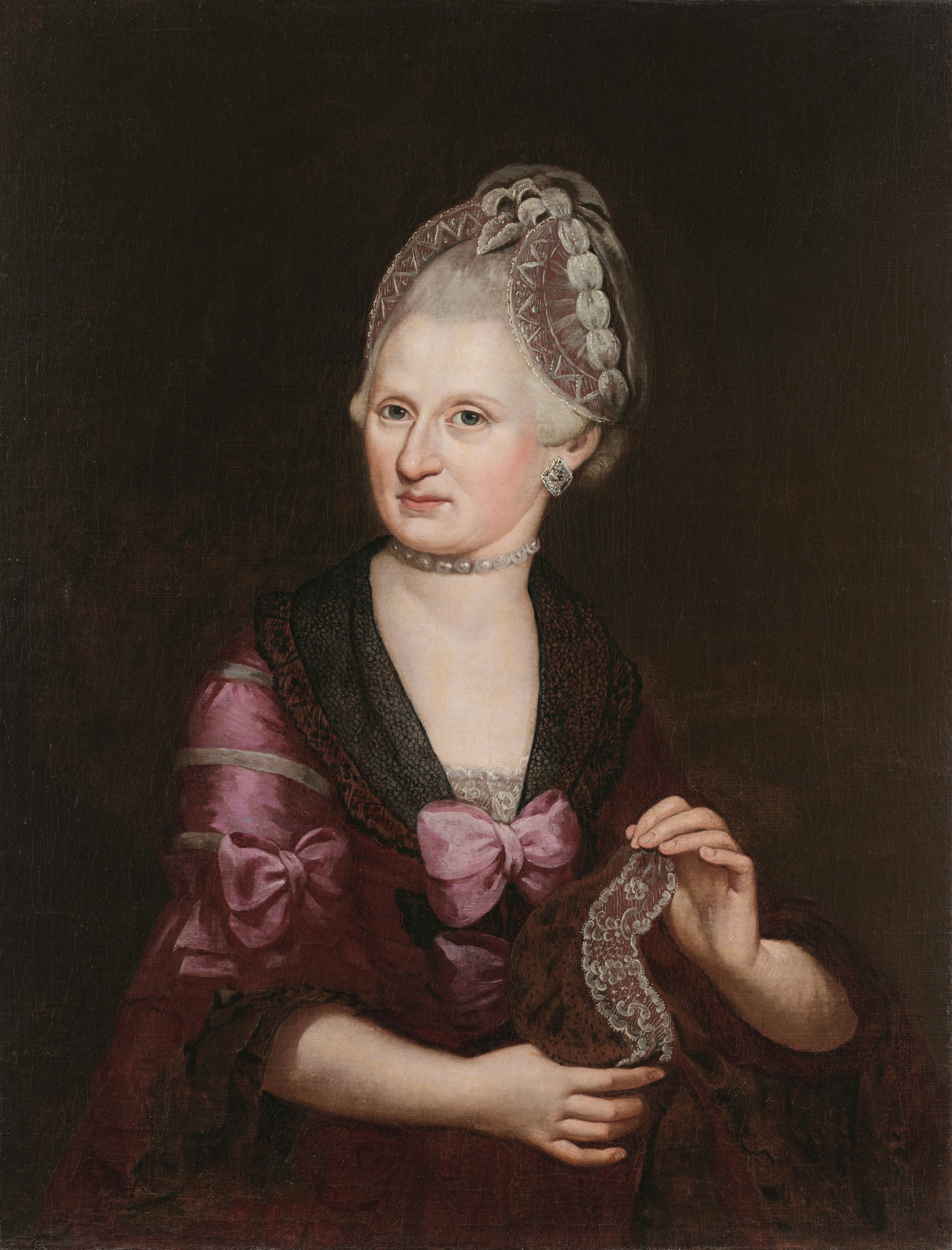
Anne Maria Mozart, née Pertl, c. 1775

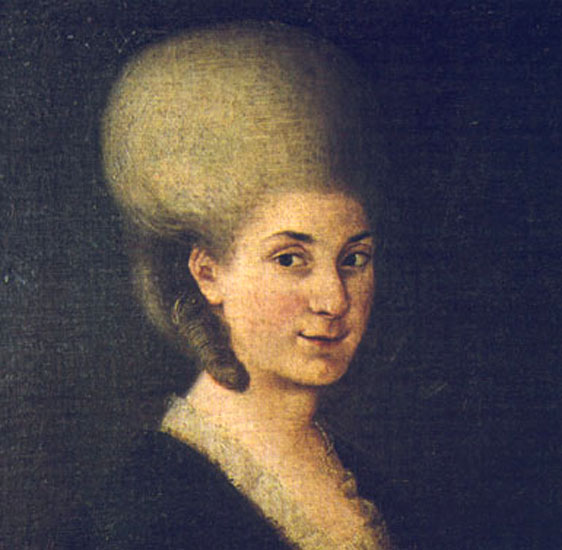
Maria Anne Mozart ("Nannerl"), c. 1785

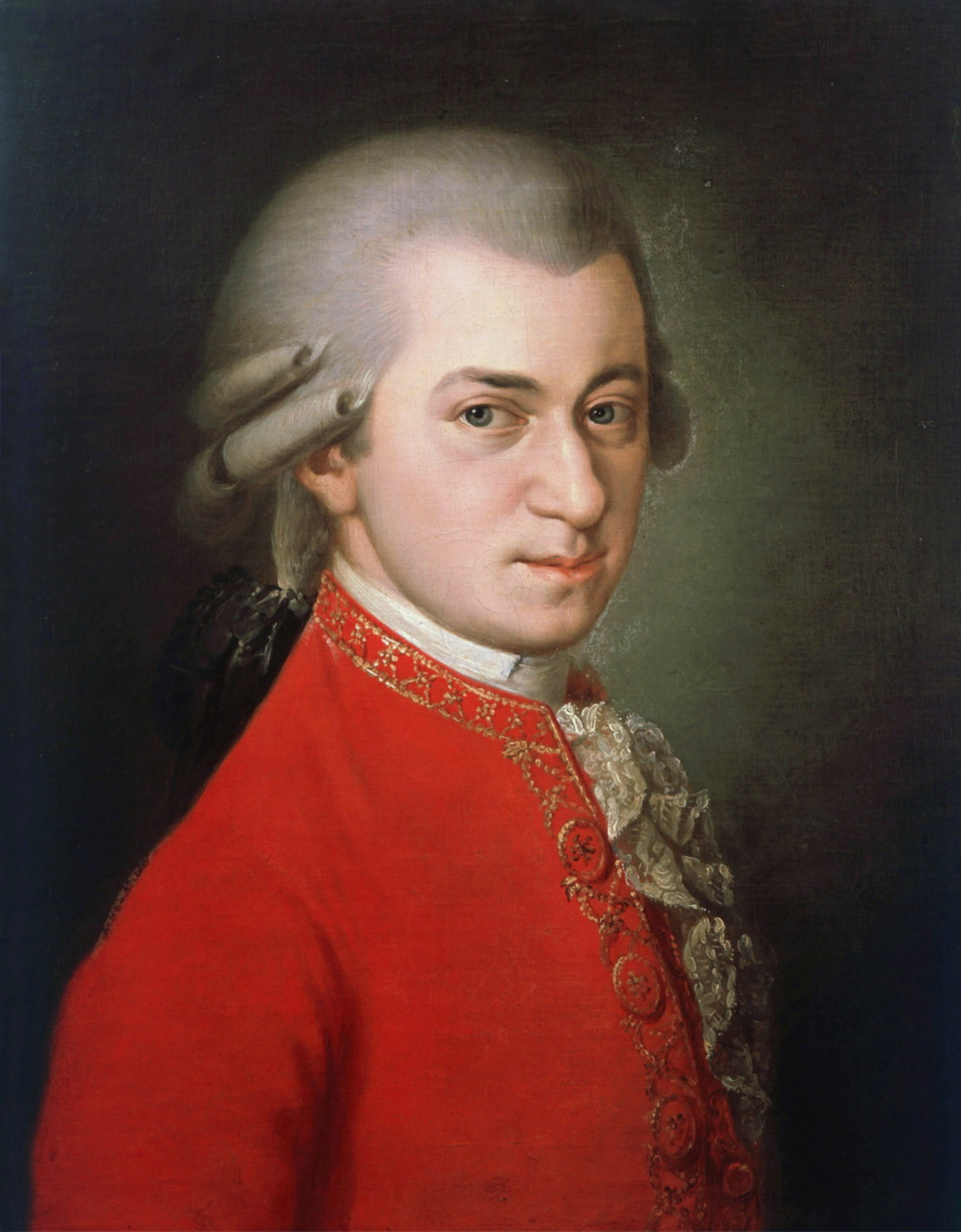
Wolfgang Amadeus Mozart

Wolfgang Mozart's wife and children

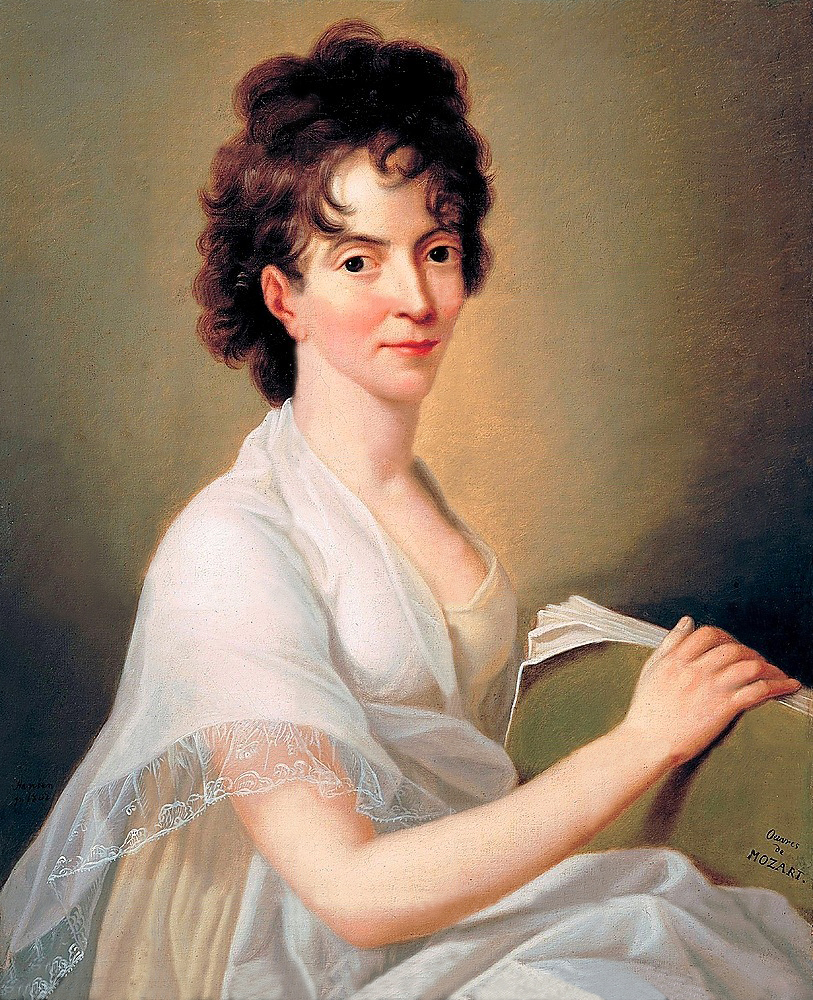
Constanze Mozart née Weber, 1802

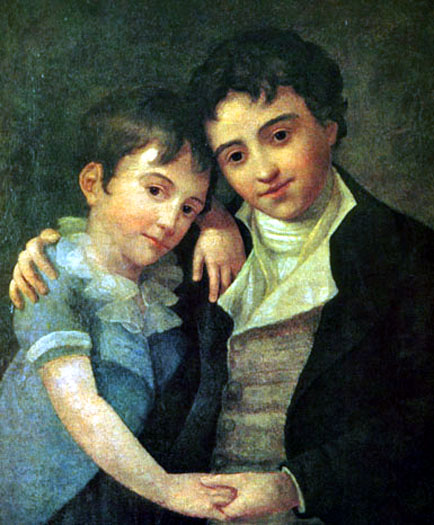
Franz Xaver Mozart and Karl Mozart. 1798

== Works cited ==
- Abert, Hermann (1921/2007) W. A. Mozart. Updated edition with footnotes by Cliff Eisen. New Haven: Yale University Press.
