= Versuch einer gründlichen Violinschule =

Literary work

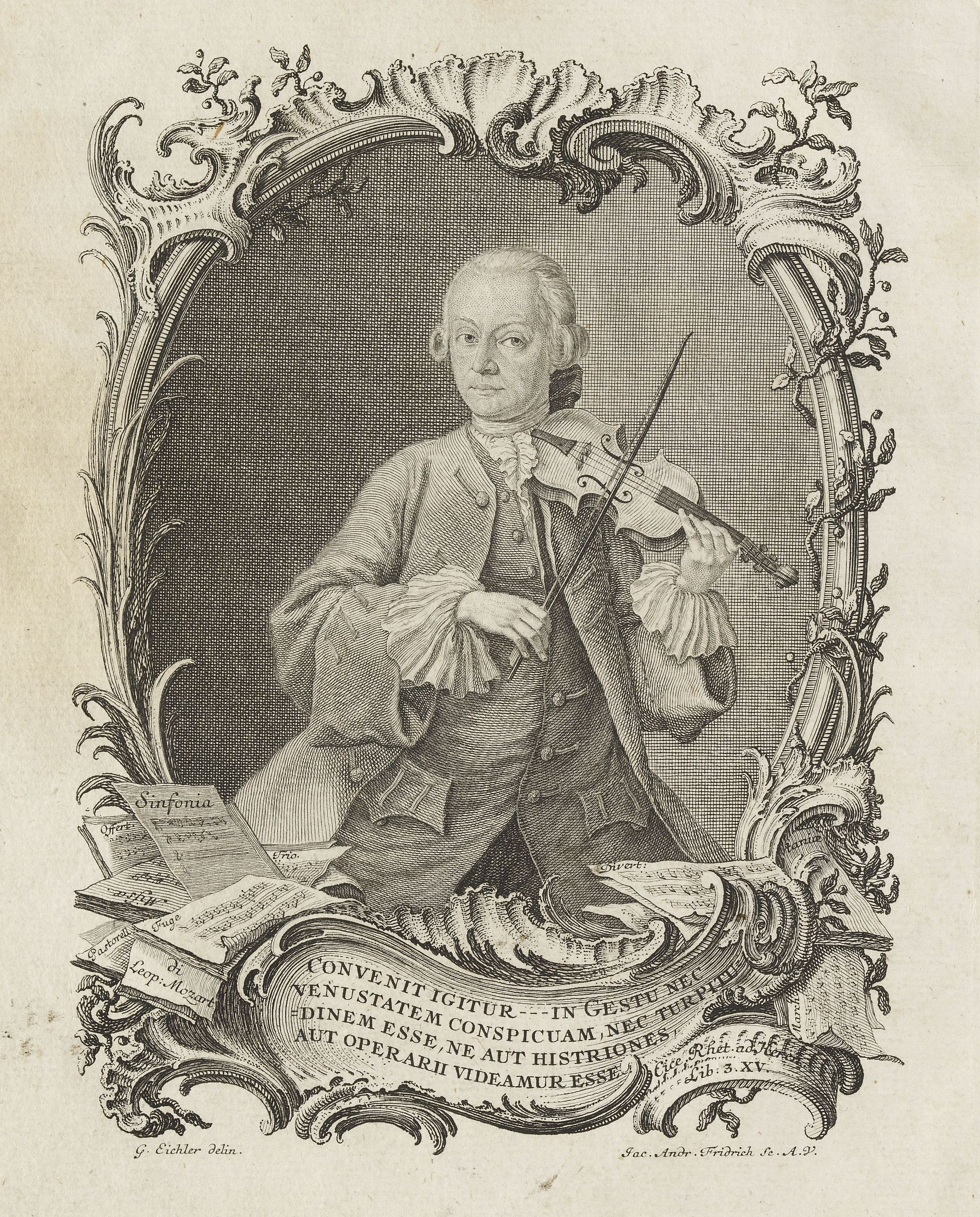
The first edition of Leopold Mozart's Violinschule included this portrait of the author. Some aspects of violin playing in his day can be seen: the lightweight, concave bow and the absence of any chin rest or shoulder rest.

Versuch einer gründlichen Violinschule (A Treatise on the Fundamental Principles of Violin Playing) is a textbook for instruction in the violin, published by Leopold Mozart in 1756. The work was influential to this day.

== Background and publication ==
Leopold Mozart's primary job was as a court musician, working for the Prince-Archbishop of Salzburg. He began with an unpaid post in the violin section and gradually worked his way up the ranks in the court musical establishment, though he never was promoted to the top position of Kapellmeister. Salaries at Salzburg were low, and Leopold supplemented his income by giving violin lessons. There is indirect evidence that Leopold was a highly skilled teacher, in that both of his children, taught exclusively by him, became extraordinary musicians: Maria Anna Mozart (called "Nannerl") and Wolfgang Amadeus Mozart.

Leopold wrote his textbook during the year 1755, when he was 36 years old. He took on the work of publication himself, assigning the task of printing to Johann Jakob Lotter, a printer in Leopold's home town of Augsburg. Leopold shipped copies of his book far and wide and received his share of the profits when they were sold. His mode of business can be seen in a letter (7 January 1770) he wrote to his wife Anna Maria, who had to take over the operation while Leopold and Wolfgang were traveling in Italy:

Put together 12 copies of the Violinschule, and send them to Joseph Wolf's bookshop, in Insprugg ... You need to enclose a short letter, something like this: You receive here 12 copies of the Violinschule, which my husband, from Verona, has told me to send you. You may keep them on commission, according to the arrangement, and sell each one at 2fl[orins] 14kr[eutzer] tyrolean coinage, and reimburse my husband at 1 fl. 45 kr. in the same coinage for the ones sold; you may put this in the paper and charge the costs to my husband in this case.

The Violinschule was successful in its day and went through two further German editions (1769, 1787), as well as being translated into Dutch (1766) and French (1770).

== The work ==
Ruth Halliwell reviews the core of the work thus: "At the level of practical comments on improving aspects of violin technique, Leopold showed himself to be full of common sense, and to be capable of expressing his explanations in robust and clear language ... The work, together with [Leopold's] correspondence about it [with printer Lotter], shows that Leopold knew exactly what he wanted to do, that he had strong opinions on how pupils should be taught to play the violin, that he had thought out how to present his material in the clearest possible way, that he wanted even impoverished pupils to be able to afford his book, and that he was prepared to put in all the necessary work to get the details just right."

Halliwell goes on to note Leopold's view that mere technical instruction would not produce fine violinists. For instance, concerning a particular aspect of bowing, Leopold insisted "that the performer pay attention to the Affekt (approximately, emotion) intended by the composer, so that the most appropriate bowing could be chosen. Leopold envisaged that the performer should be capable of studying a piece for clues about the intended Affekt... One element [necessary to this] was an education broad enough to encompass the study of literature and especially poetry, for a cantabile style should be the aim of every instrumentalist, and poetry was the key to good phrasing in music." (Leopold Mozart was himself highly cultivated, with strong interests in poetry and many other areas.)

== See also ==
- Vibrato
- Pizzicato
- Viola d'amore
