= Fuggerei =

World's oldest public housing complex still in use, in Augsburg, Germany

Coordinates: 48°22′08″N 10°54′15″E

Herrengasse in the Fuggerei

The Fuggerei is the world's oldest public housing complex still in use. It is a walled enclave within the city of Augsburg, Bavaria. It takes its name from the Fugger family and was founded in 1516 by Jakob Fugger the Younger (known as "Jakob Fugger the Rich") as a place where the needy citizens of Augsburg could be housed. By 1523, 52 houses had been built, and in the coming years the area expanded with various streets, small squares and a church. The gates were locked at night, so the Fuggerei was, in its own right, very similar to a small independent medieval town. It is still inhabited today, affording it the status of being the oldest public housing project in the world.

== Description ==
The rent was and still is one Rhenish gulden per year (equivalent to 0.88 euros (not adjusted for inflation)), as well as to make three daily prayers for the current owners of the Fuggerei – the Lord's Prayer, Hail Mary, and the Nicene Creed – and to work a part-time job in the community. The conditions to live there remain the same as they were 500 years ago: one must have lived at least two years in Augsburg, be of the Catholic faith and have become indigent without debt. The five gates are still locked every day at 10 PM.

Housing units in the area consist of 45 to 65 square metre (500–700 square foot) apartments, but because each unit has its own street entrance, it simulates living in a house. There is no shared accommodation; each family has its own apartment, which includes a kitchen, a parlour, a bedroom and a tiny spare room, altogether totalling about 60 square metres (600 sq. ft.). Ground-floor apartments all have a small garden and garden shed, while upper-floor apartments have an attic. All apartments have modern conveniences such as television and running water. One ground-floor apartment is uninhabited, serving as a museum open to the public. The doorbells have elaborate shapes, each being unique, dating back to before the installation of streetlights when residents could identify their door by feeling the handle in the dark.

== History ==
The Fugger family initially established their wealth in weaving and merchandising. Jakob the Rich expanded their interests into silver mining and trading with Venice. Additionally he was a financier and counted the Vatican as a notable client. The family became financial backers of the Habsburg family, and he financed the successful election of Charles V as Emperor of the Holy Roman Empire in 1519.

The Fuggerei was first built between 1514 and 1523 under the supervision of the architect Thomas Krebs, and in 1582, Hans Holl added St. Mark's Church to the settlement. Expanded further in 1880 and 1938, the Fuggerei today comprises 67 houses with 147 apartments, a well and an administrative building.

Wolfgang Amadeus Mozart's great-grandfather, the mason Franz Mozart, lived in the Fuggerei between 1681 and 1694 and is commemorated today by a stone plaque.

The Fuggerei was heavily damaged by the bombings of Augsburg during World War II but has been rebuilt in its original style.

== Upkeep ==
The Fuggerei is supported by a charitable trust established in 1520 which Jakob Fugger funded with an initial deposit of 10,000 guilders. According to The Wall Street Journal, the trust has been carefully managed with most of its income coming from forestry holdings, which the Fugger family favoured since the 17th century after losing money on higher yielding investments. The annual return on the trust has ranged from an after-inflation rate of 0.5% to 2%. The Fugger family foundation is currently headed by Maria-Elisabeth Gräfin Thun-Fugger, née Gräfin Fugger von Kirchberg, who lives at Kirchberg Castle. Other members of the foundations's board are Alexander Graf Fugger-Babenhausen and Maria-Theresia Gräfin Fugger-Glött. All three still existing branches of the Fugger family are thus represented. The trust is administered by Wolf-Dietrich Graf von Hundt.

As of 2026, the fee for a tour into the Fuggerei is 8.00 euro, eight times the annual rent.

Gallery

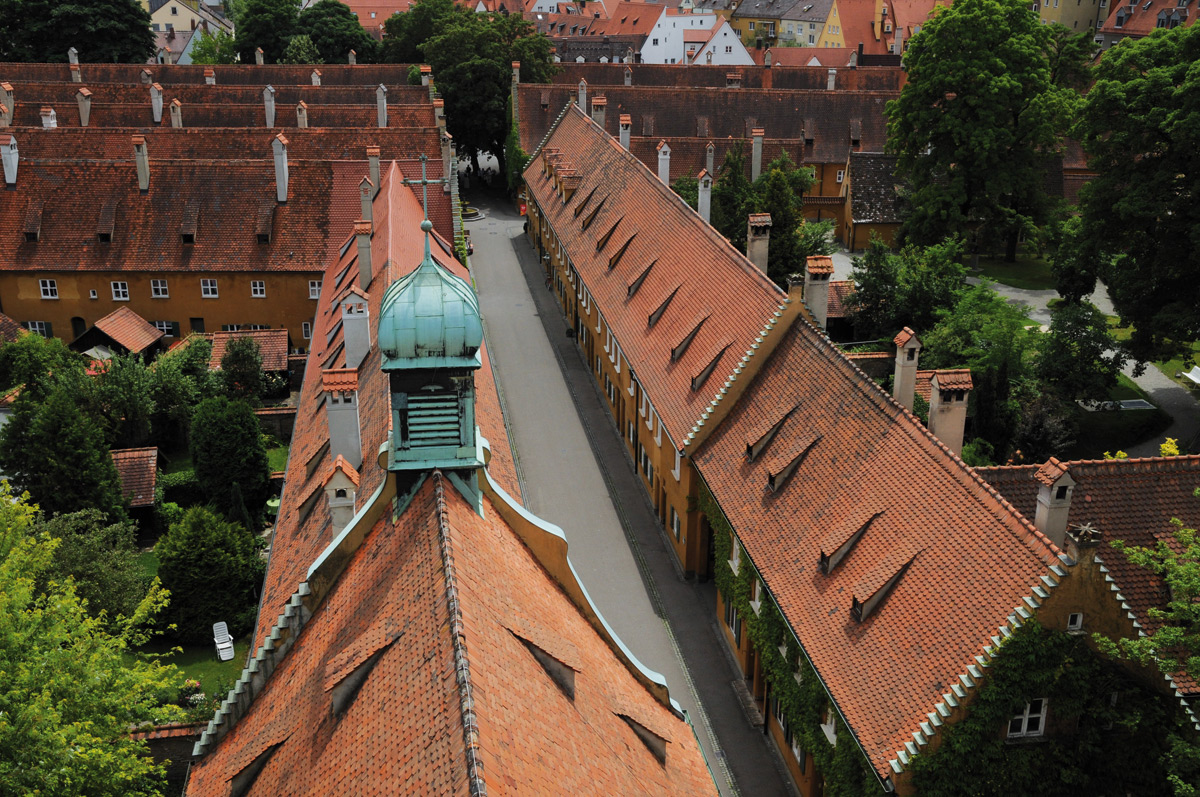
St. Mark's Church and Herrengasse

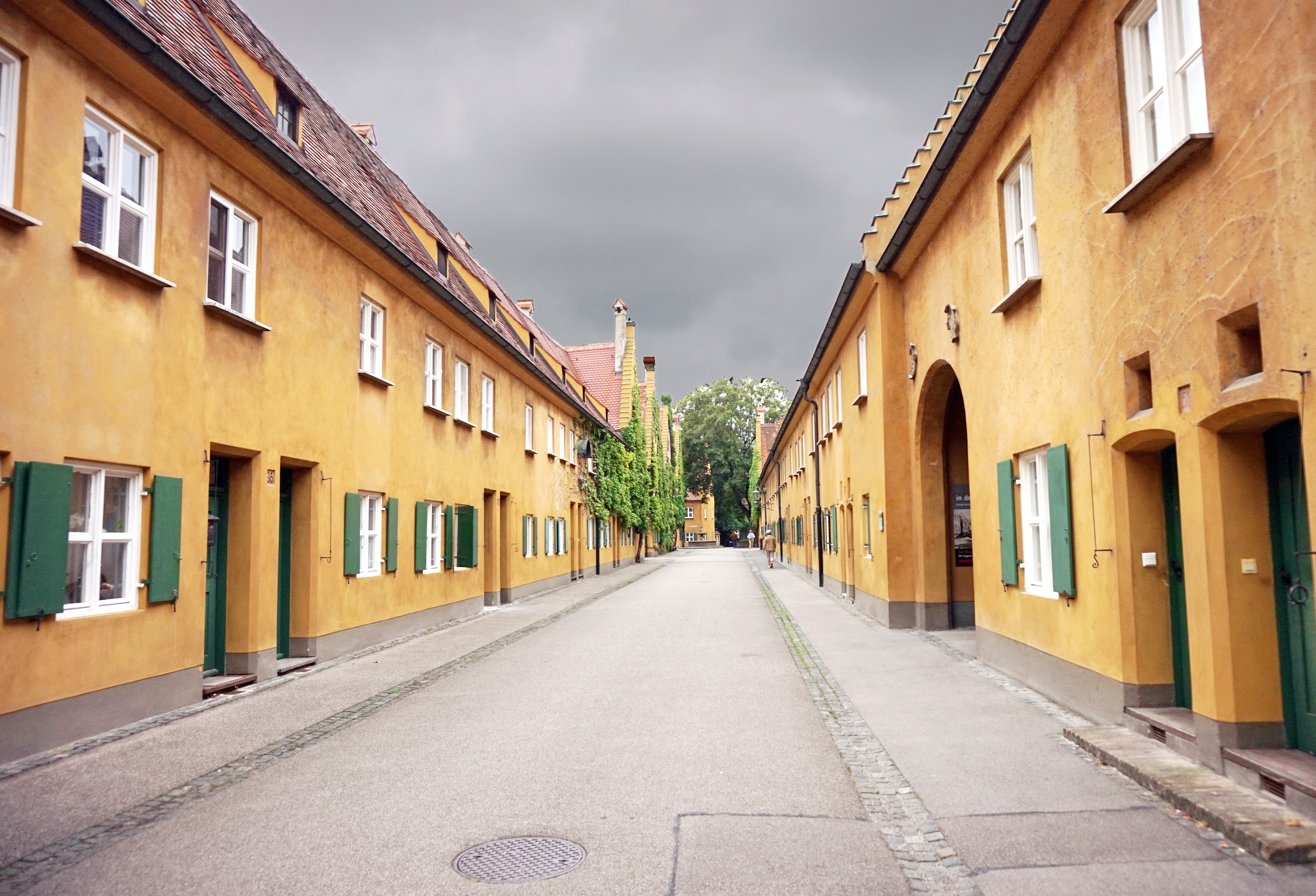
Herrengasse

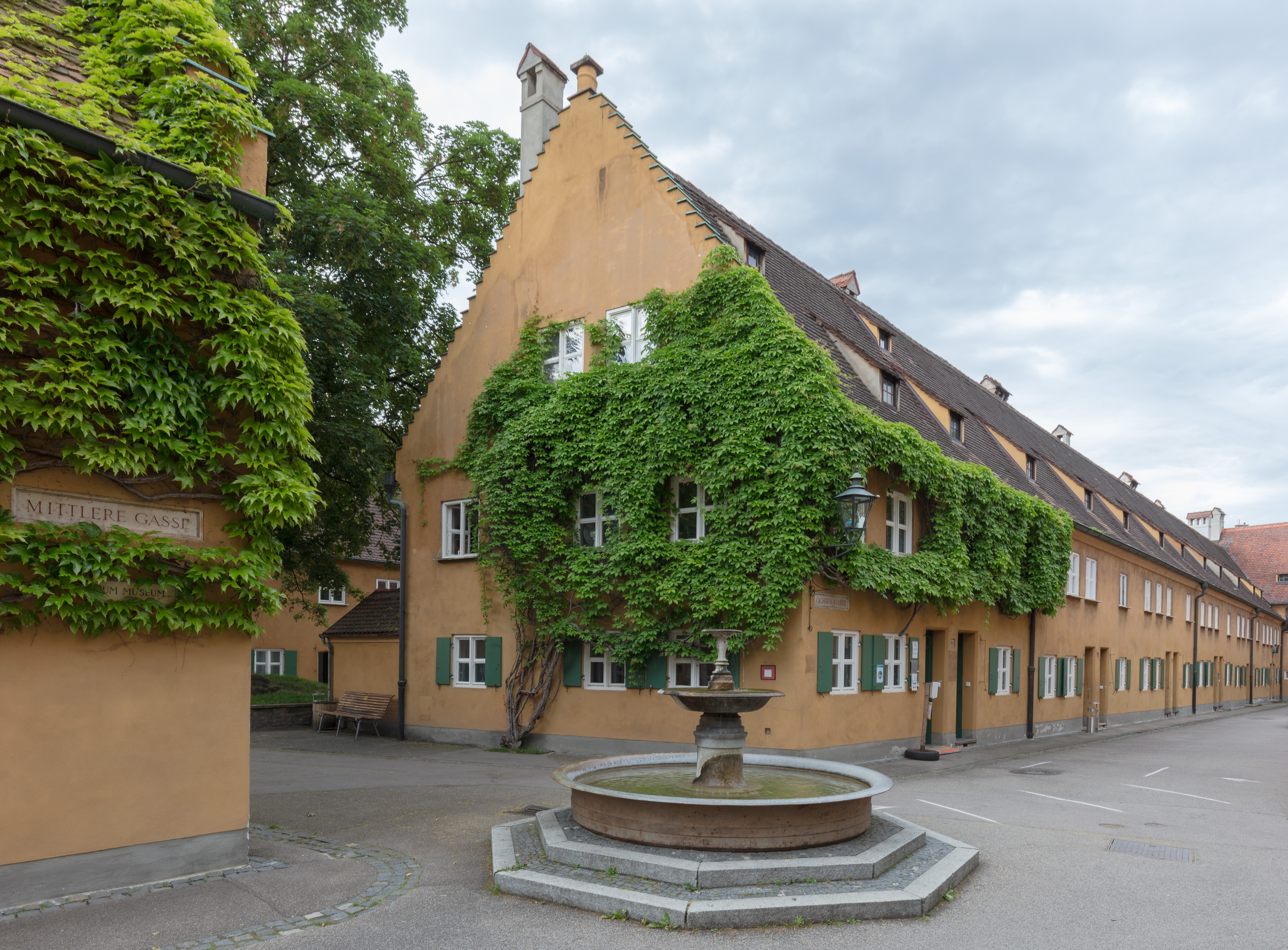
Well between Mittlere Gasse and Ochsengasse

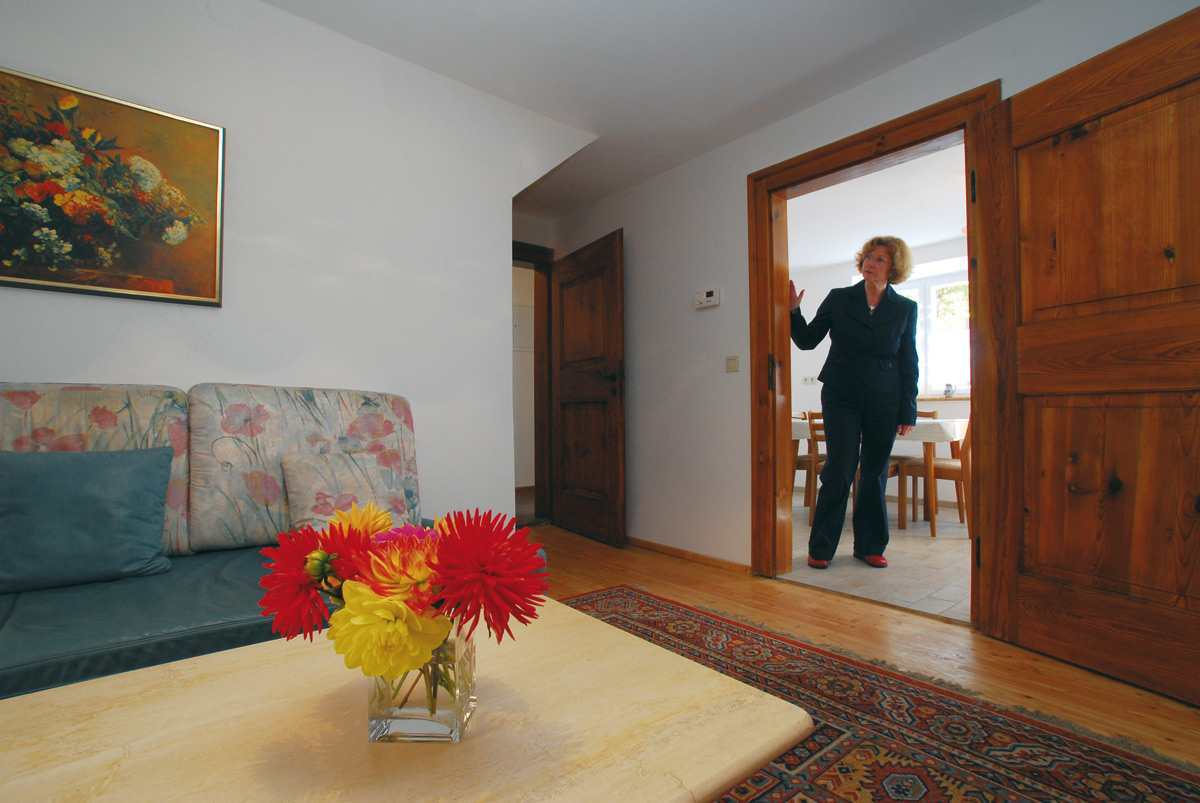
Exhibition apartment

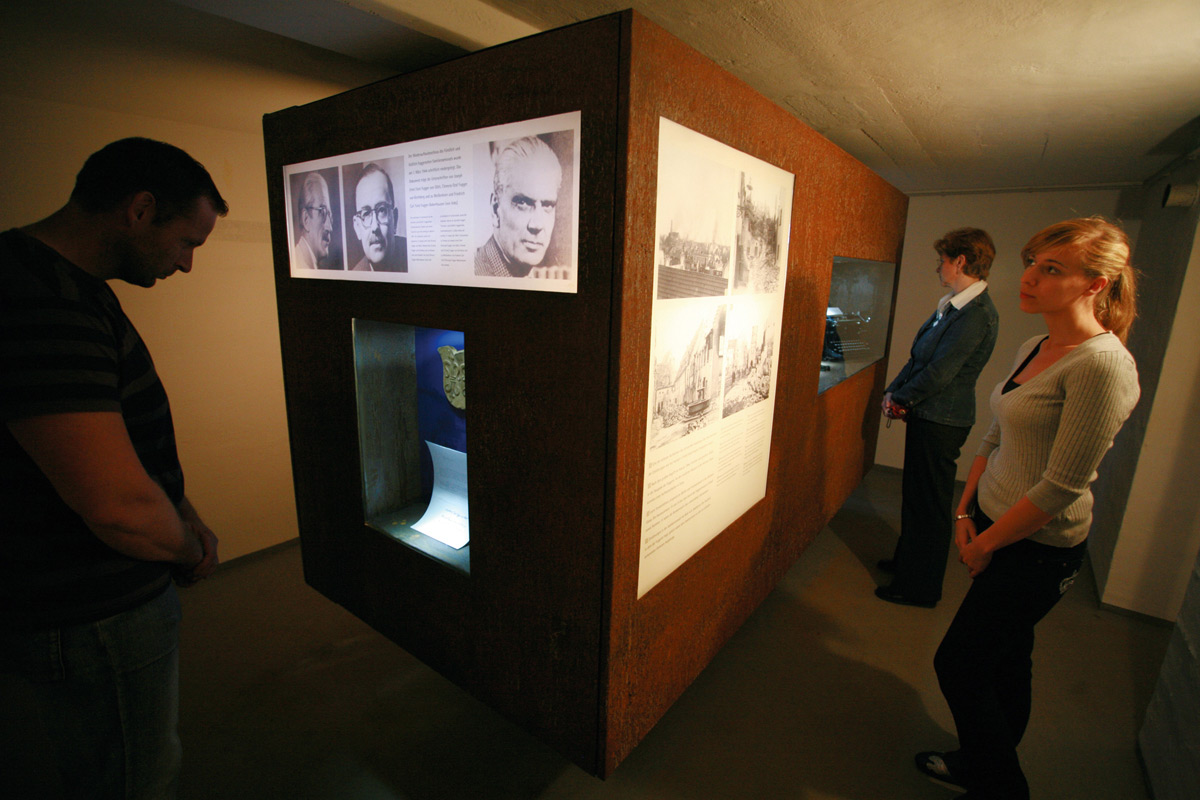
Exhibition in World War II air raid shelter

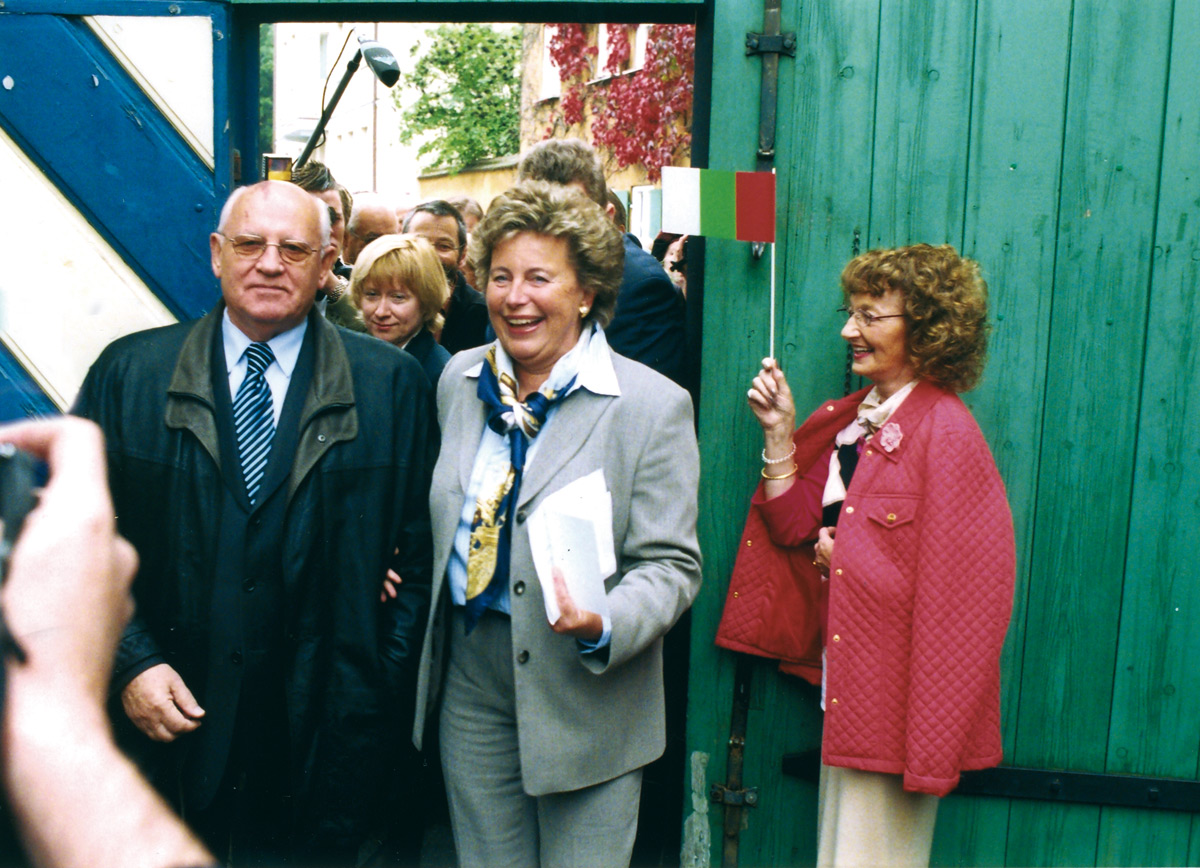
Countess Elisabeth Thun-Fugger with Mikhail Gorbachev, 2005

== See also ==
- Beguinage - housing complex created to house lay religious women who have not taken vows.
