= Maria Anna Thekla Mozart =

Cousin of Mozart (1758–1841)

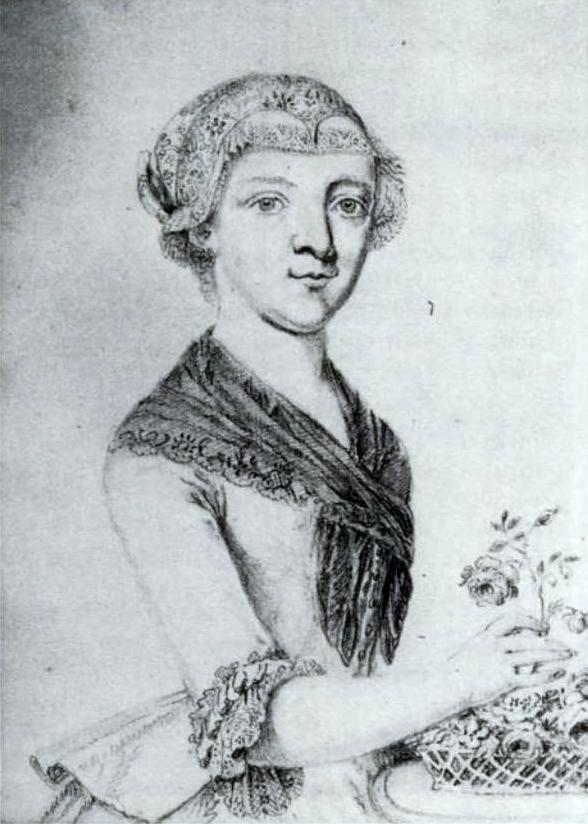
- Maria Anna Thekla Mozart. Self-portrait in pencil from 1777 or 1778. Now in the Mozart-Museum in Salzburg.
- Born: 25 September 1758; Augsburg, Germany
- Died: 25 January 1841 (aged 82)
- Other names: Marianne; Bäsle
- Parent(s): Franz Alois Mozart; Maria Victoria Eschenbach
- Relatives: Wolfgang Amadeus Mozart (first cousin); Maria Anna Mozart (first cousin); Leopold Mozart (paternal uncle); Johann Georg Mozart (paternal grandfather); Franz Mozart (paternal great-grandfather)
- Family: Mozart

Maria Anna Thekla Mozart (25 September 1758 – 25 January 1841), called Marianne, known as Bäsle ("little cousin"), was the cousin and friend of Wolfgang Amadeus Mozart.

== Biography ==
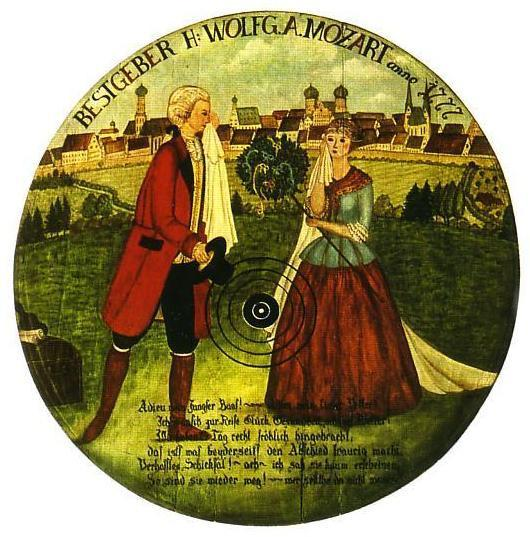
Modern reconstruction of a target for Bölzlschiessen (dart shooting), a light entertainment of the Mozart family. It depicts a sad farewell between Marianne and Mozart in 1777.

She was born in Augsburg, Germany, the third and only surviving of five daughters of Franz Alois Mozart (a younger brother of Leopold Mozart) and Maria Victoria Eschenbach. Between October 11 and October 26, 1777, 19-year-old Marianne met the 21-year-old Wolfgang in Augsburg. The young people developed a close, probably intimate relationship.

Ten letters of their subsequent correspondence have been preserved, all from Wolfgang to Marianne. These are called the "Bäsle letters" ("Bäsle" is a diminutive form in German, meaning "little cousin"). They are striking for their abundance of scatological and sexual humor. Maynard Solomon translates one passage into rhymed English as shown below (from a letter dated 23 December 1778):

"Come for a bit or else I'll shit. If you do, this high and mighty person will think you very kind, will give you a smack behind, will kiss your hands, my dear, shoot off a gun in the rear, embrace you warmly, mind, and wash your front and behind, pay you all his debts to the uttermost groat, and shoot off one with a rousing note, perhaps even let something drop from his boat."

After Mozart's return from Paris, Marianne accepted an invitation (given in the letter just quoted) to visit Mozart and his family in Salzburg. She accompanied him in January 1779 from Munich to Salzburg and stayed there for about 2 1/2 months, despite the disapproval of Mozart's father Leopold. She may have hoped for marriage to Wolfgang. If so, her wish was shattered; the former warm relationship cooled off. Their last reunion was in Augsburg in March 1781.

Marianne had been educated accordingly to her rank as citizen of the Free City of the Holy Roman Empire, and, as a teenager, gained further social education in Munich. She is described as having been beautiful, endearing, bright, humorous, and in love with life. In 1784, she gave birth to an illegitimate daughter, Maria Josepha, whose father, canon Dr. Theodor Franz de Paula Maria Baron von Reibeld (1752–1807), provided generously for mother and child.

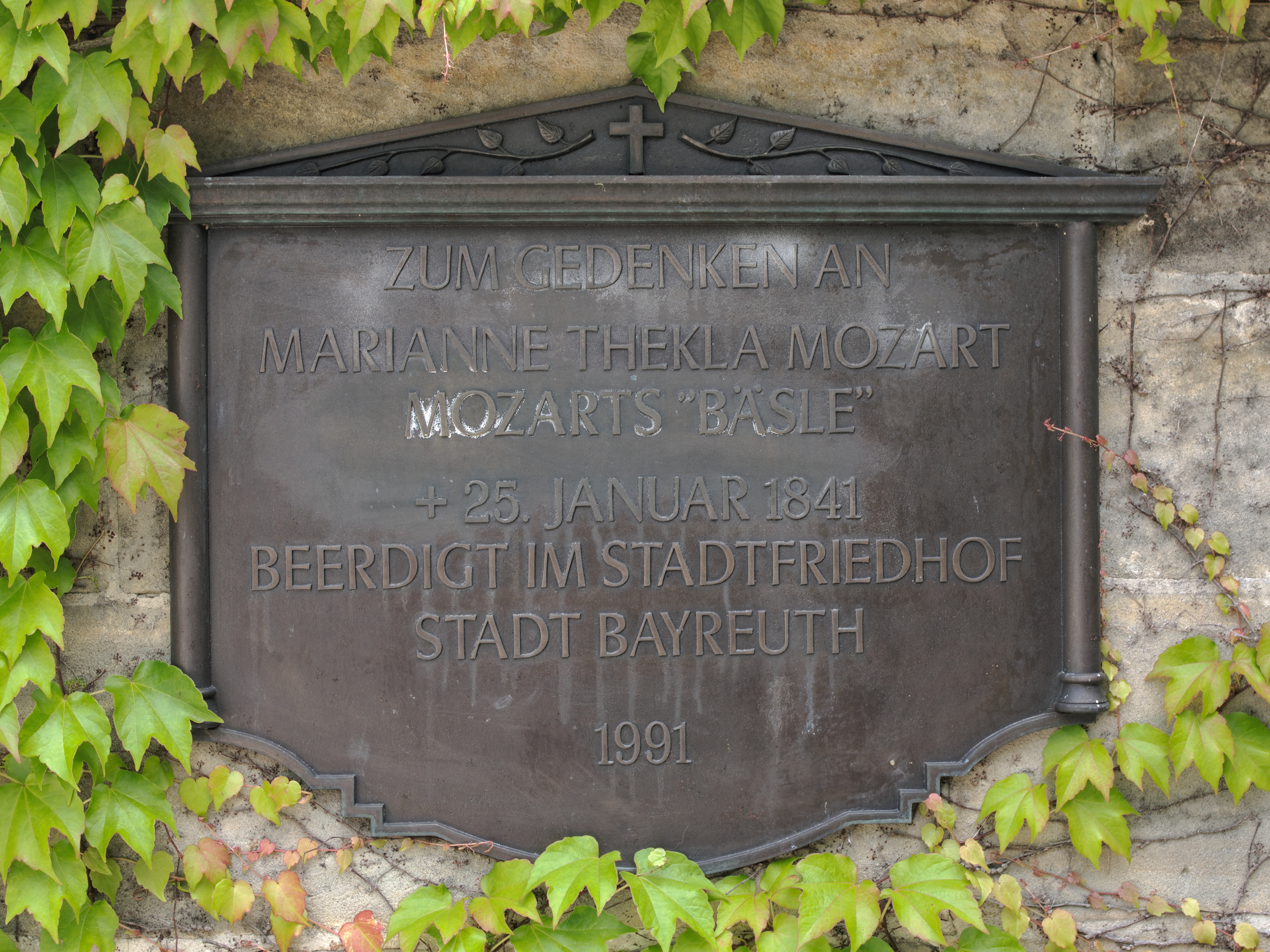
Memorial plate at the municipal cemetery.

Marianne Mozart remained unmarried her entire life. After the death of her mother, who had been widowed in 1791, she moved to live with her daughter and son-in-law, postmaster Franz-Joseph Streitel, in 1808. Already in 1803 the only grandchild, Carl Joseph, had died in infancy. Moving to Kaufbeuren in 1812, she and her family finally ended up in Bayreuth in 1814, where she lived for 27 years until her death.

Fifty years after her famous cousin, Marianne died in Bayreuth, Germany, at the age of 82. In her estate, the portrait of her cousin was found, which he had sent her from Mannheim in 1778. Only 15 months later, her 58-year-old daughter died. Both were buried in the municipal cemetery in Bayreuth, but the graves can no longer be found. In the course of the years, two memorial plates were placed, one at the Old Coaching House, the other at the entrance of the municipal cemetery.

== See also ==
- Mozart and scatology

== Notes ==
=== References ===
- Solomon, Maynard (1995) Mozart: A Life. HarperCollins.
