= Leopold Mozart =

German musician (1719–1787), W. A. Mozart's father

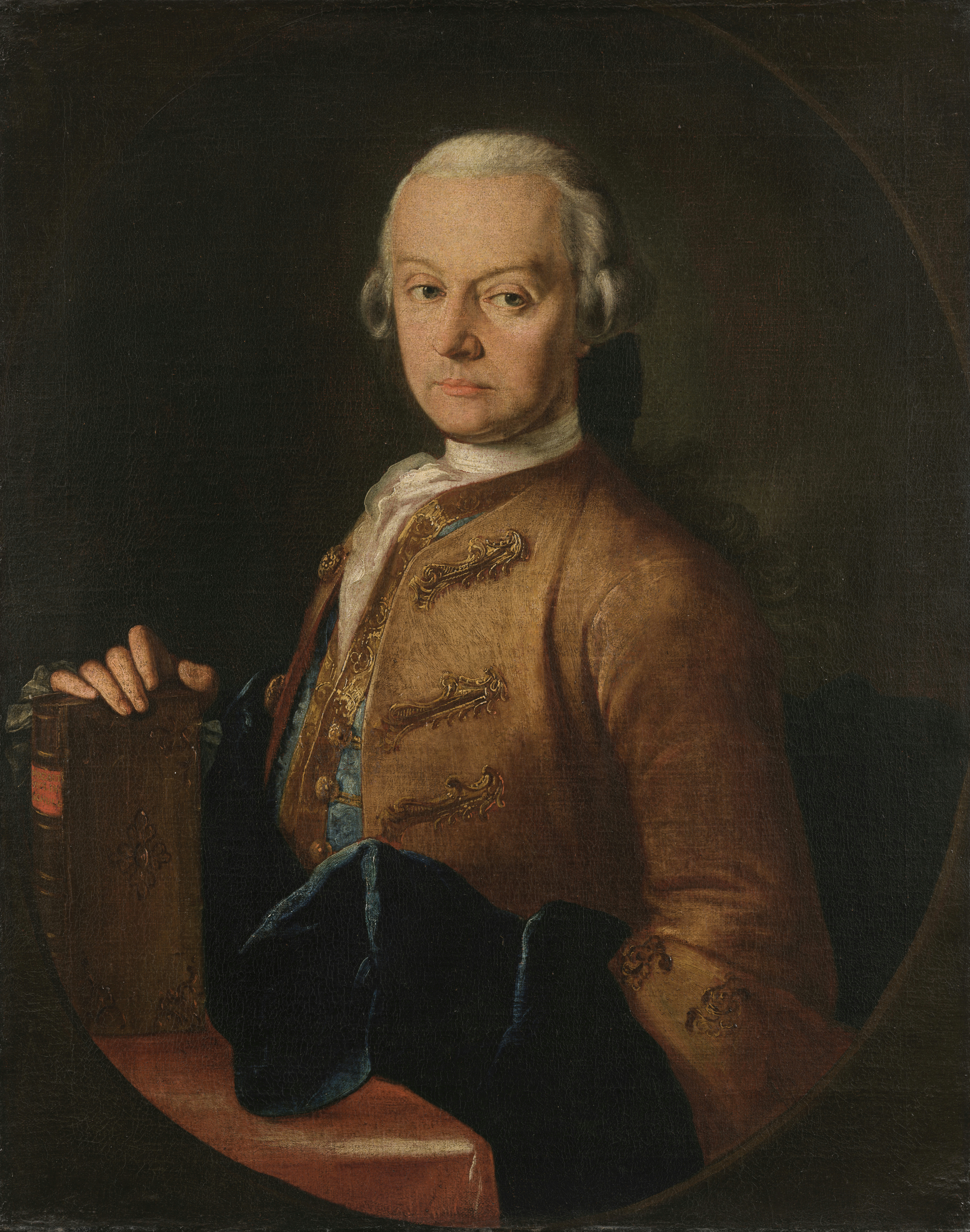
- c. 1765 portrait
- Born: Johann Georg Leopold Mozart; 14 November 1719; Free Imperial City of Augsburg, Holy Roman Empire
- Died: 28 May 1787 (aged 67); Salzburg, Prince-Archbishopric of Salzburg, Holy Roman Empire
- Occupations: Composer; court musician; music teacher
- Notable work: Versuch einer gründlichen Violinschule (1756)
- Spouse: Anna Maria Pertl (m. 1747; died 1778)
- Children: 7; 2 surviving: Maria Anna (1751–1829); Wolfgang Amadeus (1756–1791)
- Father: Johann Georg Mozart
- Family: Mozart family

Johann Georg Leopold Mozart (14 November 1719 – 28 May 1787) was a German composer, violinist, and music theorist. He is best known today as the father and teacher of Wolfgang Amadeus Mozart, and for his violin textbook Versuch einer gründlichen Violinschule (1756).

== Life and career ==
=== Childhood and youth ===
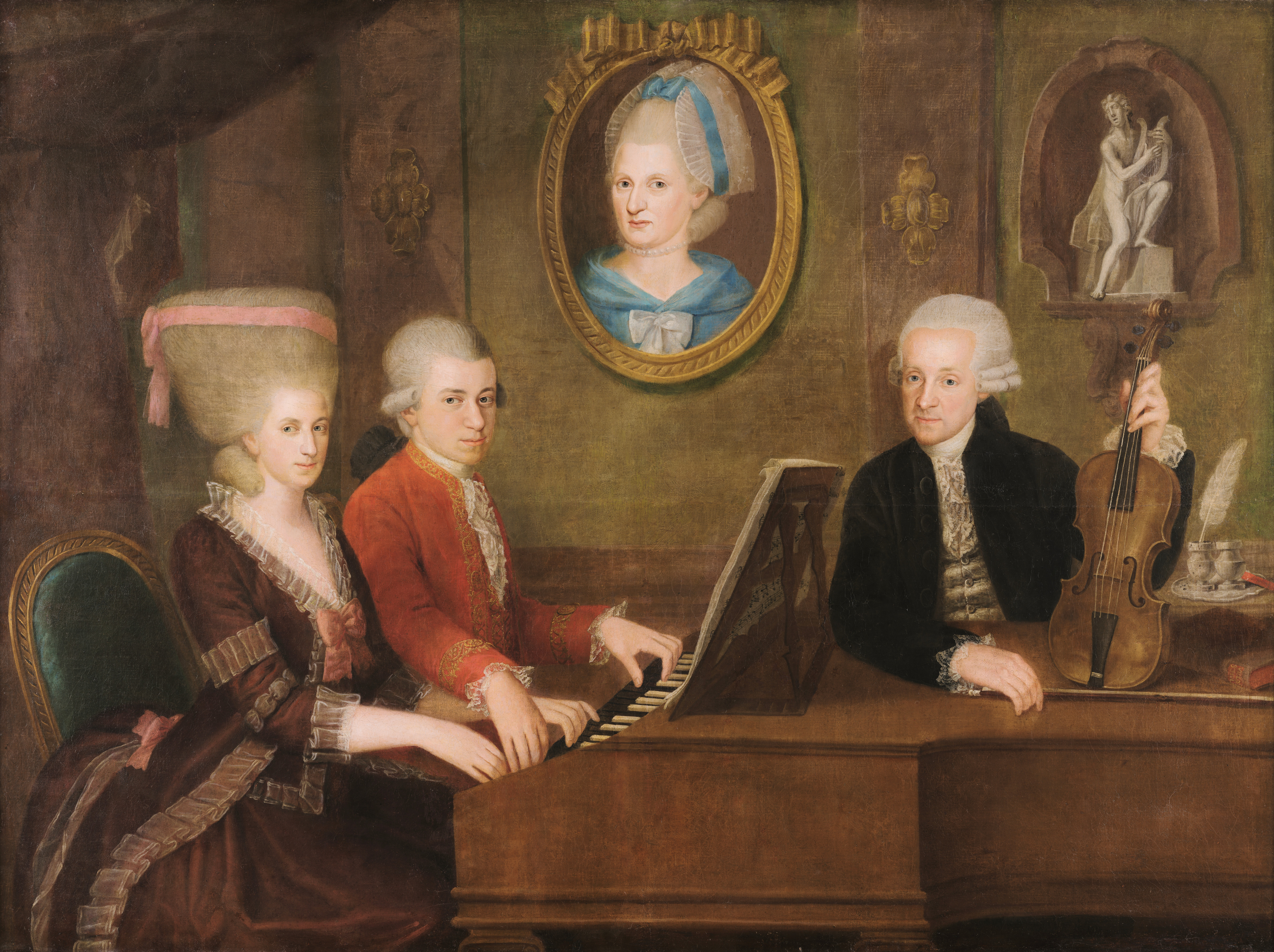
Mozart family

Mozart was born in Augsburg on 14 November 1719, son of Johann Georg Mozart, a bookbinder, and his second wife Anna Maria Sulzer. From an early age, Mozart sang as a choirboy. He attended a local Jesuit school, St. Salvator, where he studied logic, science, and theology, graduating magna cum laude in 1735. Mozart studied then at the St. Salvator Lyzeum.

While a student in Augsburg, Mozart appeared in student theater productions as an actor and singer, and became a skilled violinist and organist. He also developed an interest, which he retained, in microscopes and telescopes. (Note: Records of the high-quality English optical instruments, made by Dollond of London, that he owned in later life appear in the public announcement of his estate sale, 15 September 1787, published in Deutsch 1965, pp. 296–297.) Although his parents had planned a career for Leopold as a Catholic priest, this apparently was not Leopold's own wish. An old school friend told Wolfgang Amadeus Mozart in 1777, "Ah he [Leopold] was a great fellow. My father thought the world of him. And how he hoodwinked the clerics about becoming a priest!"

Mozart withdrew from the St. Salvator Lyzeum after less than a year. Following a year's delay, he moved to Salzburg to resume his education, enrolling in November 1737 at the Benedictine University (now University of Salzburg) to study philosophy and jurisprudence. At the time, Salzburg was the capital of an independent state within the Holy Roman Empire (the Prince-Archbishopric of Salzburg), now part of Austria. Except for periods of travel, Leopold spent the rest of his life there.

Leopold received the degree of Bachelor of Philosophy in 1738. However, in September 1739, he was expelled from the university for poor attendance, having "hardly attended Natural Science more than once or twice".

=== Early music career ===
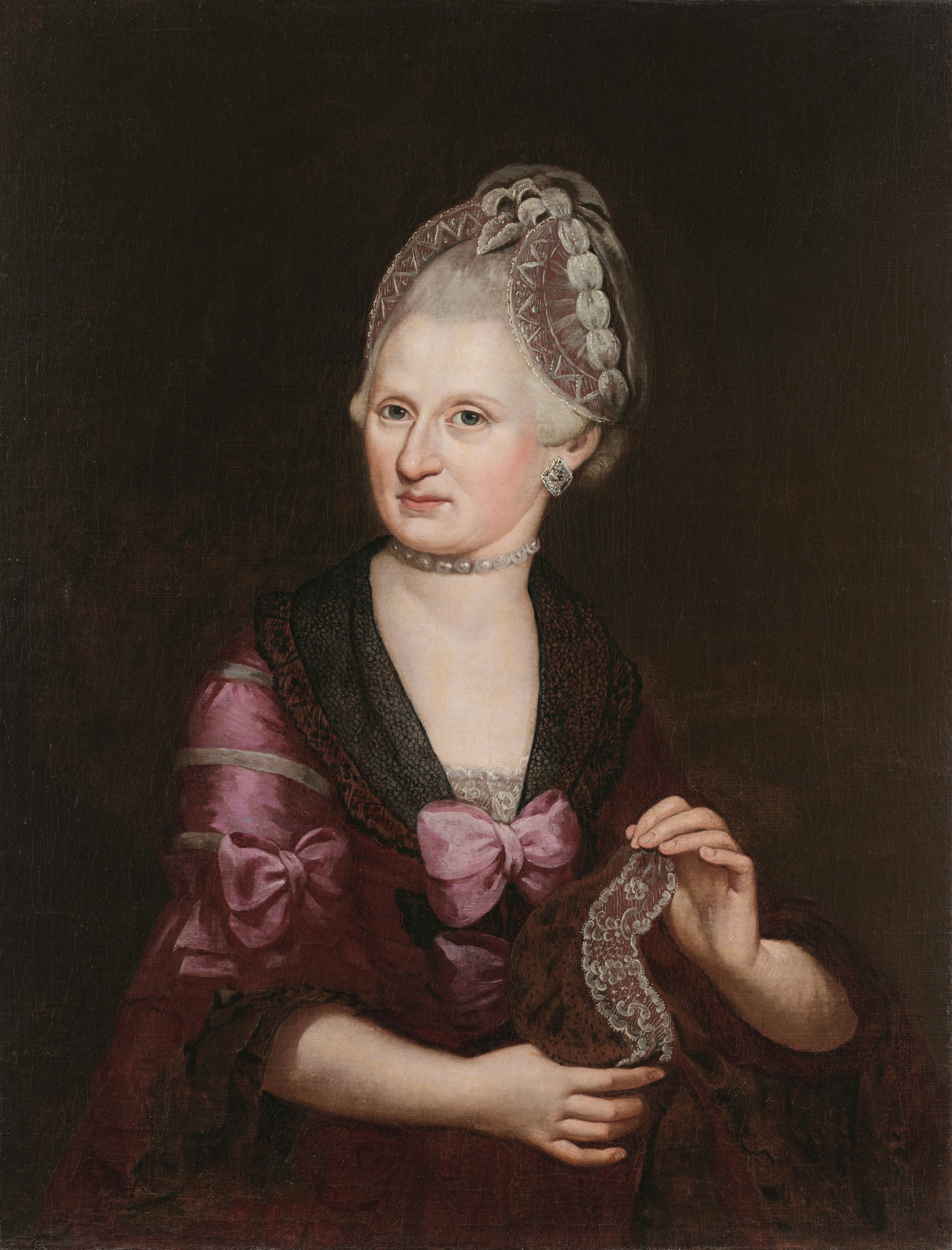
Anna Maria Pertl Mozart, wife of Leopold

In 1740, Mozart began his career as a professional musician, becoming violinist and valet to one of the university's canons, Johann Baptist, Count of Thurn-Valsassina and Taxis. This was also the year of his first musical publication, the six Trio Sonatas, Opus 1. These were titled Sonate sei da chiesa e da camera; Leopold did the work of copper engraving himself. He continued to compose, producing a series of German Passion cantatas. (Note: In music a Passion tells the story of the last days of Jesus, as in J. S. Bach's St Matthew Passion)

On 21 November 1747, Mozart married Anna Maria Pertl. Abert wrote that "the two were regarded at the time as the handsomest couple in Salzburg." The couple moved (perhaps with Anna Maria's mother) into an apartment on the third floor of Getreidegasse 9. Their landlord was Lorenz Hagenauer, who was a close friend of Leopold's, and a frequent correspondent on the family's later travels.

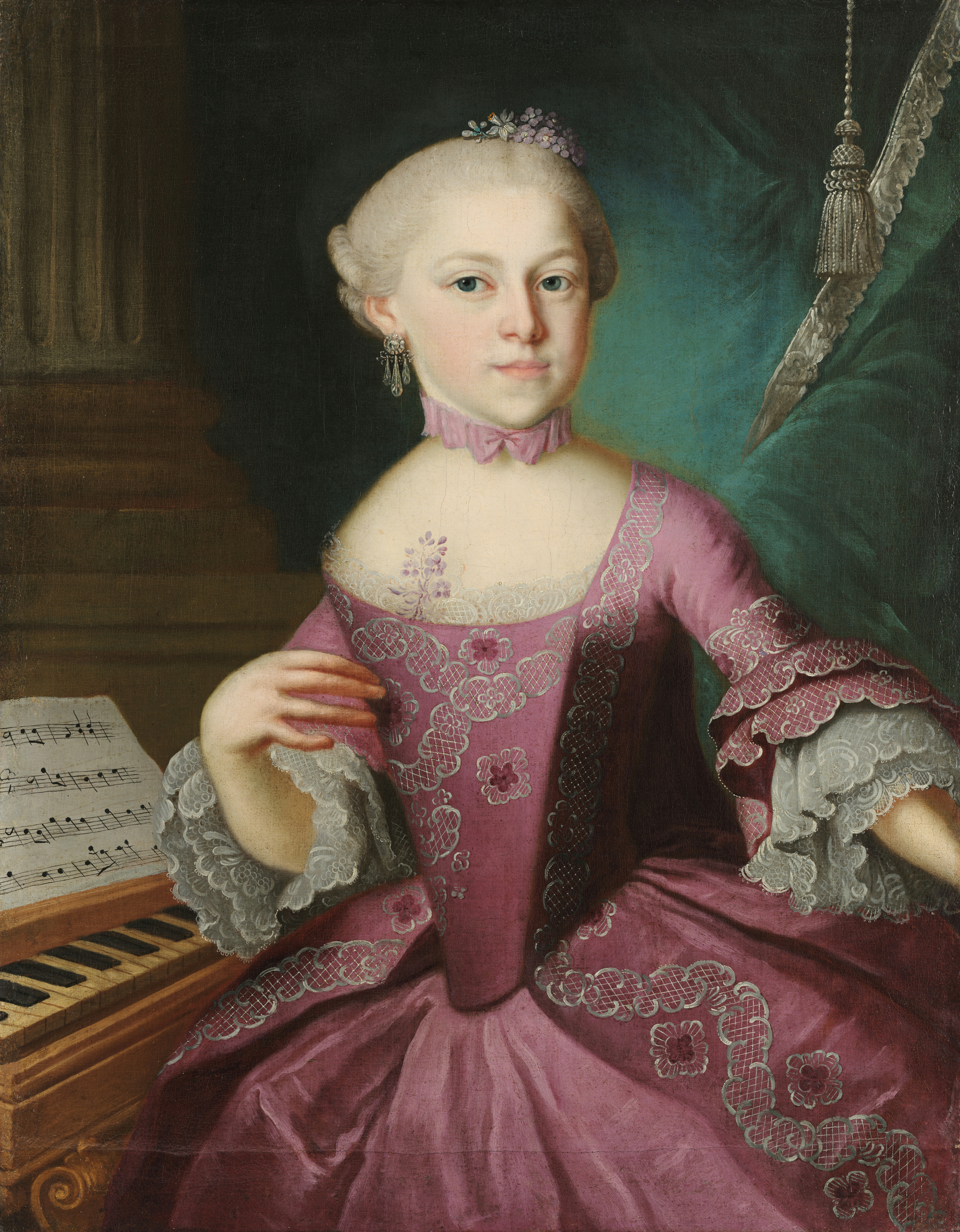
Maria Anna (Nannerl) Mozart as a child (1763), said to be by Pietro Antonio Lorenzoni

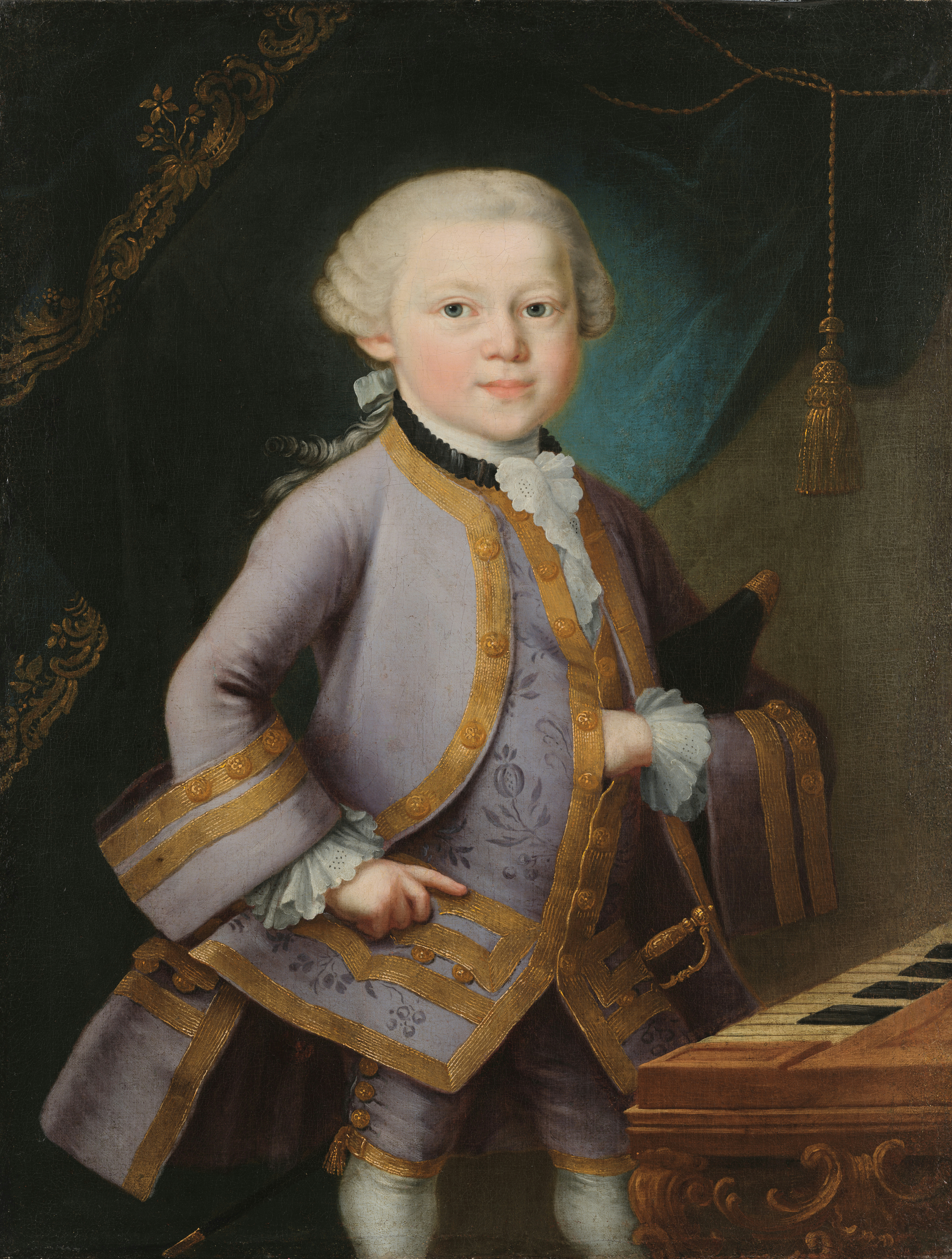
Wolfgang Amadeus Mozart as a child (1763), said to be by Pietro Antonio Lorenzoni

Anna Maria was almost always pregnant in the first decade of their marriage, giving birth to seven children in just under eight years. However, only two of them survived infancy:

- Johann Leopold Joachim (18 August 1748 – 2 February 1749)
- Maria Anna Cordula (18 June 1749 – 24 June 1749)
- Maria Anna Nepomucena Walpurgis (13 May 1750 – 29 July 1750)
- Maria Anna Walburga Ignatia, "Nannerl" (30 July 1751 – 29 October 1829)
- Johann Karl Amadeus (4 November 1752 – 2 February 1753)
- Maria Crescentia Francisca de Paula (9 May 1754 – 27 June 1754)
- Johann Chrysostomus Wolfgang Theophilus (27 January 1756 – 5 December 1791)

In 1743, Mozart was appointed to a position (fourth violinist) in the musical establishment of Count Leopold Anton von Firmian, the ruling Prince-Archbishop of Salzburg. His duties included composition and the teaching of violin (later, piano) to the choirboys of the Salzburg cathedral. Mozart was promoted to second violinist in 1758 and in 1763 to deputy Kapellmeister. (Note: Leopold is sometimes described as having had the post of "court composer" at Salzburg. The Grove Dictionary, addressing this, says "the title 'Hofkomponist' [court composer], used to describe Mozart in a 1757 report on Salzburg published in F. W. Marpurg's Historisch-kritische Beyträge zur Aufnahme der Musik, had no official sanction.") He rose no further; others were repeatedly promoted over him to the head position of Kapellmeister.

The question of whether Leopold was successful as a composer (either in terms of artistic success or fame) is debated. The Grove Dictionary says that as of 1756, "Mozart was already well-known. His works circulated widely in German-speaking Europe." However, biographer Maynard Solomon asserts that Mozart "failed to make his mark as a composer", and Alfred Einstein "judged him to be an undistinguished composer".

However, scholars agree that Leopold was successful as a pedagogue. In 1755, he wrote his Versuch einer gründlichen Violinschule, a comprehensive treatise on violin playing. This work was published in 1756 (the year of Wolfgang's birth), and went through two further German editions (1769, 1787), as well as being translated into Dutch (1766) and French (1770). Today, the work is consulted by musicians interested in 18th-century performance practice; see Historically informed performance. This work made a reputation in Europe for Leopold, and his name begins to appear around this time in music dictionaries and other works of musical pedagogy.

=== As teacher of Nannerl and Wolfgang ===
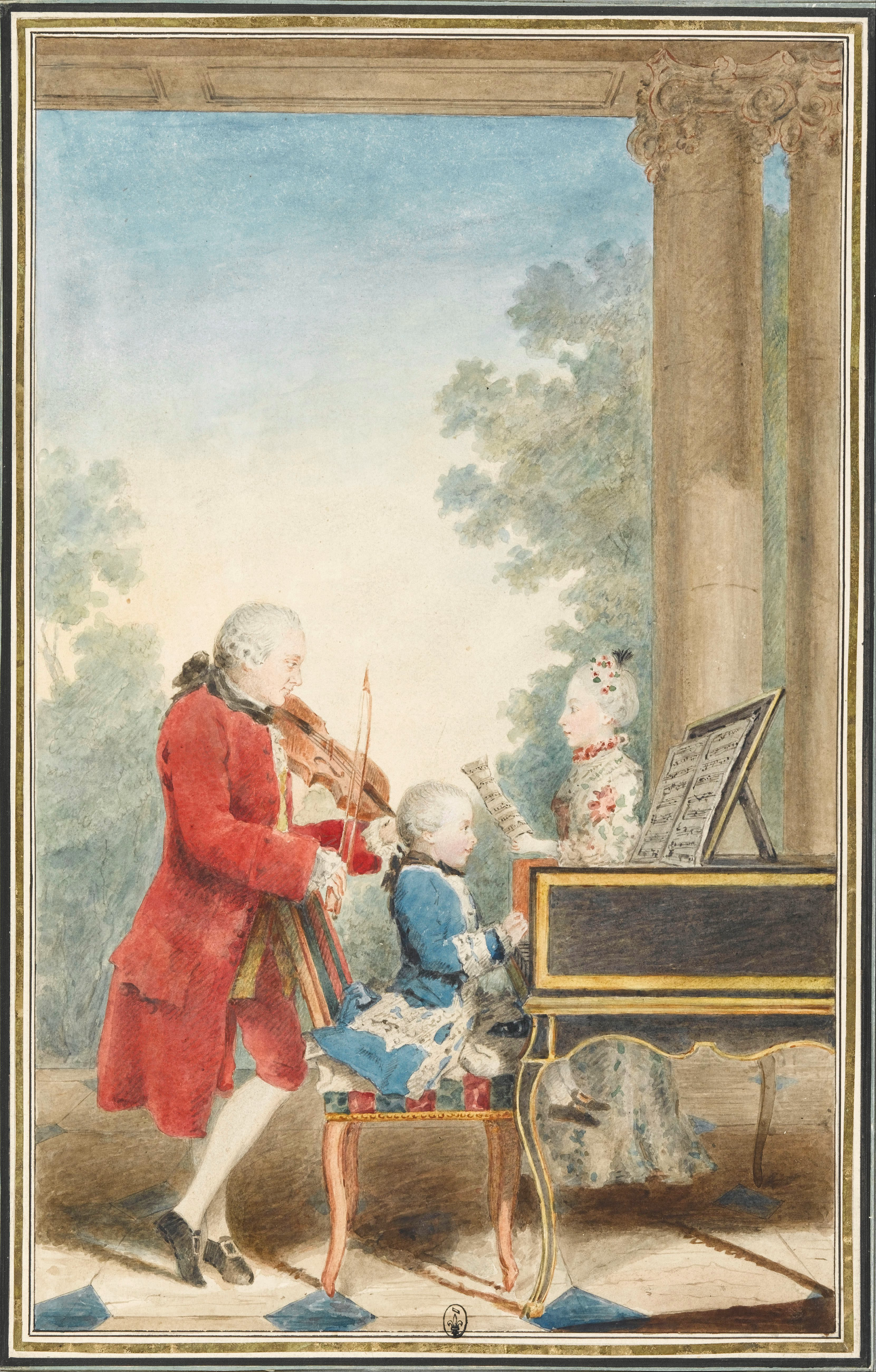
The Mozart family on tour: Leopold, Wolfgang, and Nannerl. Watercolor by Carmontelle, ca. 1763

Mozart discovered that his two children were child prodigies in about 1759, when he began with keyboard lessons for the seven-year-old Nannerl. The toddler Wolfgang immediately began imitating his sister, at first picking out thirds on the keyboard (Note: From Nannerl's reminiscences, composed 1792 and printed in Deutsch 1965) and then making rapid progress under Leopold's instruction. By 1762, the children were ready to work as concert performers, and Leopold began taking the family on extensive concert tours, performing for both aristocracy and public, throughout central and western Europe. This tour included Munich, Vienna, Pressburg (Bratislava), Paris and the Hague together with a lengthy stay in London; see Mozart family Grand Tour.

The discovery of his children's talent is considered to have been a life-transforming event for Mozart. He once referred to his son as the "miracle which God let be born in Salzburg". Of Leopold's attitude, the Grove Dictionary says:

The recognition of this 'miracle' must have struck Leopold with the force of a divine revelation and he felt his responsibility to be not merely a father's and teacher's but a missionary's as well.

By "missionary", the Grove Dictionary refers to the family's concert tours.

Scholars differ on whether the tours made substantial profits. To be sure, often the children performed before large audiences and took in large sums, but the expenses of travel were also very high, and no money at all was made during the various times that Mozart and the children suffered serious illnesses. Mozart biographer Maynard Solomon 1995 takes the view that the tours were lucrative and produced long-term profits for Leopold; Ruth Halliwell 1998 states to the contrary that their income generally only covered their travel and living expenses.

Since the instruction took much of his time, and the touring kept him away from Salzburg for long periods, Mozart cut down his activities in other areas. Nannerl later claimed that he "entirely gave up both violin instruction and composition in order to direct that time not claimed in service to the prince to the education of his two children". After 1762, his compositional efforts seem to have been limited to revising his earlier work, and by 1771 he had ceased composing altogether.

The touring continued into the early 1770s. The last three trips were to Italy, with only the father accompanying Wolfgang. Leopold Mozart's failure to advance above his Vice-Kapellmeister position at Salzburg is attributed by the Grove Dictionary to the great amount of time that the journeys kept him away from Salzburg (the longest journey was about three-and-a-half years). After the final return from Italy in 1773, Leopold was repeatedly passed over for the Kapellmeister post.

=== Family life in Salzburg ===
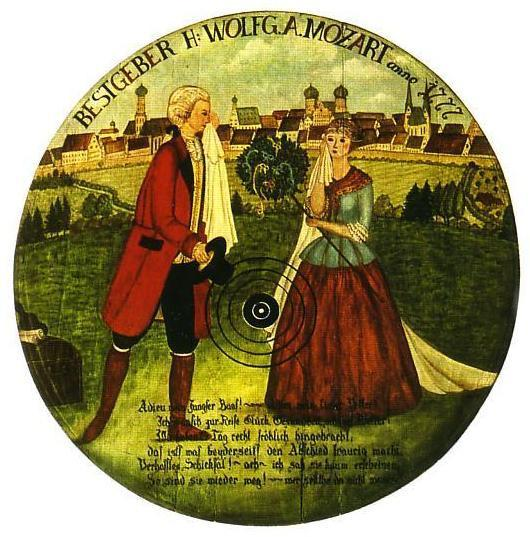
Bölzlschiessen target, Wolfgang and his cousin Maria Anna Thekla Mozart, October 1777

Although Mozart is portrayed (notably by Halliwell 1998) as generally quite worried about money, the Mozart family evidently by 1773 felt prosperous enough to upgrade their living quarters. They left the home in the Getreidegasse where the children had been born and moved to rooms in the Tanzmeisterhaus ("Dancing-Master's House"), which had been the home of the recently deceased dancing master Franz Karl Gottlieb Spöckner. As tenants of Spöckner's cousin and heir Maria Anna Raab, the Mozarts had eight rooms, including the quite large room that Spöckner had used for dancing lessons. This the Mozarts used for teaching, for domestic concerts, for storing keyboard instruments sold by Leopold, and for Bölzlschiessen, a form of recreation in which family and their guests shot airguns at humorously designed paper targets.

Starting around this time, a major preoccupation was the lengthy and frustrating struggle to find a professional position for his son. His wife died in 1778 in Paris while accompanying Wolfgang on a job-hunting tour.

== Relations with his children in their adulthood ==
Mozart is a controversial figure among his biographers, with the largest disagreements arising concerning his role as the parent of adult children. Mozart biographer Maynard Solomon has taken a particularly harsh view of Leopold, treating him as tyrannical, mendacious, and possessive; Ruth Halliwell adopts a far more sympathetic view, portraying his correspondence as a sensible effort to guide the life of a grossly irresponsible Wolfgang.

=== Relations with Nannerl ===
Wolfgang left home permanently in 1781 (see below), and from this time until 1784, his father lived in Salzburg with just Nannerl (now in her early 30s) and their servants. Nannerl had a number of suitors, of whom the most important was Franz Armand d'Ippold, with whom she was evidently in love. In the end she did not marry him, and the reason for this is unknown. One possibility, frequently entertained by biographers, is that the marriage was blocked by Leopold, who liked having Nannerl at home as the lady of the house. However, Halliwell observes that no written evidence on this point survives and insists that we simply do not know why Nannerl married so late. Nannerl finally did marry in August 1784, at age 33. She moved to the home of her new husband, Johann Baptist Franz von Berchtold zu Sonnenburg, in the small rural town of St. Gilgen, roughly six hours journey east of Salzburg.

During his remaining years, Mozart spent a fair amount of his time trying to help Nannerl at a distance, as her new marriage situation, involving five apparently ill-educated stepchildren, was apparently not easy. According to Halliwell, Nannerl depended on him in many ways: he did "shopping [and] the engagement of servants. ... He relayed news from Salzburg, Munich, and Vienna to divert her, did his best to organize the maintenance of her fortepiano, paid for Wolfgang's music to be copied and arranged for her to receive it; collected musicians together when she had visited him so that she could play it with most of the parts; .. tried to look after her health; and encouraged her to stand up to her husband when he was being unreasonable." Following Leopold's death in 1787, Nannerl had to do without this support, and Halliwell asserts that "there is every reason to believe that Leopold's death was devastating" to her."

=== Raising Nannerl's child ===
In July 1785, Nannerl came to Salzburg to give birth to her first child, a son. The infant stayed with his grandfather when she returned home, and with the assistance of his servants, he raised the child. He frequently sent letters to Nannerl (at least one per week) that usually began with the sentence "Leopoldl is healthy", ("Leopoldl" is "Little Leopold") and offered a full report on the child. Leopoldl stayed until his grandfather's death in May 1787. He apparently found raising his grandson a happy experience. Halliwell relates one repeated episode:

(As a toddler,) [he] was developing a will of his own, had to be cajoled into doing what Leopold wanted – Leopold's stratagem for persuading him to go to bed was to pretend to climb into Leopoldl's bed, whereupon Leopoldl would gleefully try to push him away and get in himself.

Maynard Solomon suggests that in keeping his grandson in his home, Mozart may have hoped to train yet another musical prodigy. Halliwell notes a different possibility: that conditions for child-rearing in the Berchtold household were distinctly suboptimal.

=== Relations with Wolfgang ===
Wolfgang left home for good in 1781, when instead of returning from a stay in Vienna with his employer Archbishop Colloredo he remained in the city to pursue a freelance career. This effort was to a fair degree successful; Wolfgang achieved great fame and was for a time quite prosperous (though poor planning later changed this status). The move almost certainly aided Wolfgang's musical development; the great majority of his most celebrated works were composed in Vienna.

As indicated by Mozart's return letters (which alone survive), his father was strongly opposed to the Vienna move, wanting Wolfgang to return to Salzburg. A fairly harsh family quarrel resulted. He was also strongly opposed to Wolfgang's marriage to Constanze Weber in 1782, and gave his permission late, reluctantly, and under duress. (Note: Halliwell 1998, p. 383 suggests that Constanze had already moved in with Wolfgang before marriage, a potentially disastrous situation given the mores of the time.) Biographers differ on the extent that Constanze was later snubbed by Leopold, if at all, during her visit with Wolfgang (July – October 1783) to Salzburg; the Grove Dictionary calls the visit "not entirely happy".

In 1785, he visited Wolfgang and Constanze in Vienna, at a time when his son's career success was at its peak. He witnessed first hand his son's success as a performer, and on 12 February heard Joseph Haydn's widely quoted words of praise, upon hearing the string quartets Wolfgang dedicated to him, "Before God and as an honest man I tell you that your son is the greatest composer known to me either in person or by name: He has taste, and, furthermore, the most profound knowledge of composition." (Note: Letter from Leopold Mozart to his daughter Maria Anna from 16 February 1785. In the original: "Ich sage ihnen vor gott, als ein ehrlicher Mann, ihr Sohn ist der größte Componist, den ich von Person und den Nahmen nach kenne: er hat geschmack, und über das die größte Compositionswissenschaft." For more details of the occasion, see Haydn and Mozart) The visit was the last time that Leopold saw his son, though they continued to correspond, and Wolfgang sometimes sent copies of his piano concertos and string quartets for Leopold and Nannerl to perform with friends.

Later in 1785, when Leopold Mozart took in Nannerl's child, Wolfgang was not informed. However, in the following year Wolfgang found this out from a mutual acquaintance in Vienna. At this time, Wolfgang wrote to Leopold to ask if he would be willing to take care of his own two children while he and Constanze went on concert tour. Leopold turned him down, probably with harsh words. His letter to Wolfgang does not survive, but his summary to Nannerl of it does (17 November 1786):

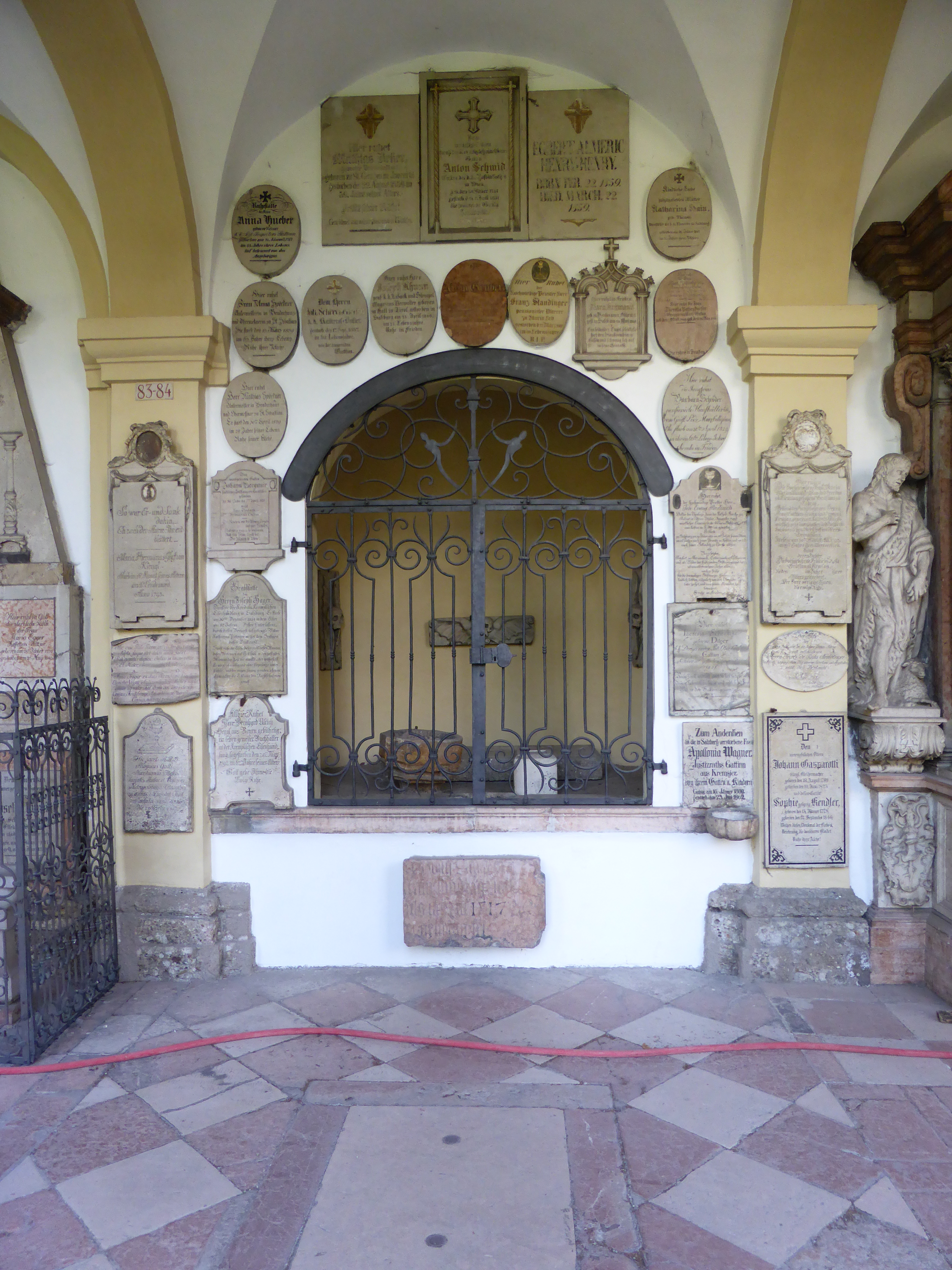
Communal grave no. 84 in the St. Sebastian Cemetery in Salzburg, where Leopold Mozart was buried

Today I had to answer a letter from your brother which cost me a lot of writing, so I can write very little to you ... You'll readily understand that I had to write a very emphatic letter, because he made no lesser suggestion than that I should take his 2 children into my care, since he would like to make a journey through Germany to England ... The good honest silhouette maker H[err] Müller had sung Leopoldl's praises to your brother, so he found out that the child is with me, which I'd never told him: so this was how the good idea occurred to him or perhaps his wife. that would certainly not be bad, – They could travel in peace, – could die, – could stay in England, – then I could run after them with the children etc: as for the payment he's offering me for the children, for servants and the children etc: – Basta! [=Enough!] My excuse is forceful and instructive, if he cares to profit from it.

For interpretations of this letter, see Halliwell 1998, p. 528, which takes a viewpoint sympathetic to Leopold, and Solomon 1995, p. 396, which takes a viewpoint sympathetic to Wolfgang.

Starting around the time he wrote this letter and continuing through the first part of 1787, his health was failing. He had become seriously ill by 4 April. On this day, Wolfgang wrote to him in alarm at the news, though he did not travel to Salzburg to see him. When Leopold Mozart died on 28 May (see below), Wolfgang was unable to attend the funeral since the travel time to Salzburg was too long.

Little information is available on how Wolfgang took his father's death, but a postscript he included in a letter to his friend Gottfried von Jacquin suggests that, despite the quarrels and partial estrangement, his father's death was a blow to him: "I inform you that on returning home today I received the sad news of my most beloved father's death. You can imagine the state I am in."

== Compositions ==
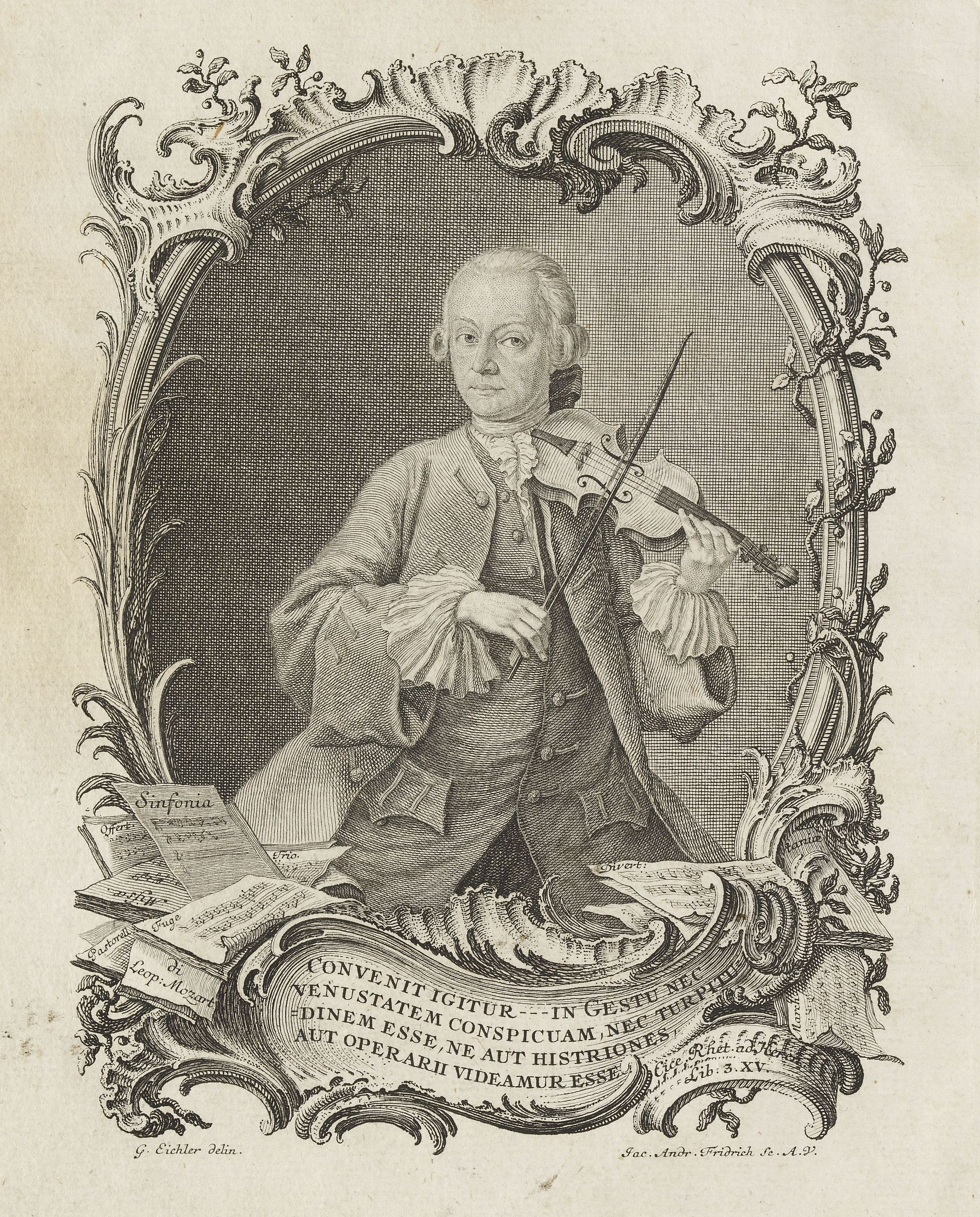
The first edition of Leopold Mozart's Violinschule included this portrait of the author. Some aspects of violin playing in his day can be seen: the lightweight, convex bow and the absence of any chin rest or shoulder rest.

See Category:Compositions by Leopold Mozart

Leopold Mozart's music is inevitably overshadowed by the work of his son Wolfgang, and in any case the father willingly sacrificed his own career to promote his son's. But his Cassation in G for Orchestra and Toys (Toy Symphony), (also variously attributed to Joseph Haydn, Michael Haydn, and Austrian Benedictine monk Edmund Angerer) remains popular, and a number of symphonies, a trumpet concerto, and other works also survive.

A contemporary report described what he had composed prior to 1757:

many contrapuntal and other church items; further a great number of symphonies, some only à 4 (Note: This would mean: four string parts only; violin I, violin II, viola, cello/bass.) but others with all the customary instruments; likewise more than 30 large serenades in which solos for various instruments appear. In addition he has brought forth many concertos, in particular for the transverse flute, oboe, bassoon, Waldhorn, trumpet etc.: countless trios and divertimentos for various instruments; 12 oratorios and a number of theatrical items, even pantomimes, and especially certain occasional pieces such as martial music ... Turkish music, music with 'steel keyboard' and lastly a musical sleigh ride; not to speak of marches, so-called 'Nachtstücke' ['night pieces'] and many hundreds of minuets, opera dances and similar items.

Leopold Mozart was much concerned with a naturalistic feel to his compositions, his Jagdsinfonie (or Sinfonia da Caccia for four horns and strings) calls for shotguns, and his Bauernhochzeit (Peasant Wedding) includes bagpipes, hurdy-gurdy, a dulcimer, whoops and whistles (ad. lib.), and pistol shots. Musikalische Schlittenfahrt (musical sleigh ride) calls for bells and whips in addition to a rich orchestra.

His oeuvre was extensive, but only recently have scholars begun to assess the scope or the quality of it; much is lost, and it is not known how representative the surviving works are of his overall output. Cliff Eisen, who wrote a doctoral dissertation on Leopold Mozart's symphonies, finds in a Symphony in G major examples of his "sensitivity to orchestral colour" and a work that "compares favourably with those of virtually any of Mozart's immediate contemporaries".

Some of his work was erroneously attributed to Wolfgang and some pieces attributed to Leopold were subsequently shown to be the work of Wolfgang. Much of what survives is light music but there is some more substantial work including his Sacramental Litany in D major (1762) and three fortepiano sonatas, all published in his lifetime.

== Assessment ==
The assessment of Leopold Mozart as a person and as a father brings forth serious disagreement among scholars. The Grove Dictionary article, by Cliff Eisen, denounces "his misrepresentation at the hands of later biographers":

A man of broad cultural achievement ... Leopold Mozart may have been haughty, difficult to please and at times intractable, ... but there is no compelling evidence that Mozart was excessively manipulative, intolerant, autocratic or jealous of his son's talent. On the contrary, a careful reading in context of the family letters reveals a father who cared deeply for his son but who was frequently frustrated in his greatest ambition: to secure for Wolfgang a worldly position appropriate to his genius.

Other scholars have taken a harsher view. Solomon portrays Mozart as a man who loved his children but was unwilling to grant them their independence when they reached adulthood, resulting in considerable hardship for them. Daniel Steptoe makes a similar assessment, and particularly faults Leopold for having blamed Wolfgang for his mother's early death – not just immediately following the death in 1778 ("a crushing reply to a young man grieving for his mother"), but even later on in 1780.

Robert Spaethling, who translated Mozart's letters, typically takes a position strongly sympathetic to Wolfgang in his struggles with his father; he describes Wolfgang's resignation of his Salzburg position and marriage to Constanze as a two-act "drama of liberation from Salzburg, specially Wolfgang's liberation from Leopold Mozart".
