= Franz Mozart =

German mason and great-grandfather of Wolfgang Amadeus Mozart

- Born: 3 October 1649; Augsburg, Holy Roman Empire
- Died: 1693 or 1694 (aged 44–45); Augsburg, Holy Roman Empire
- Occupation: Bricklayer
- Children: 3 including Johann Georg Mozart, Franz Mozart (sculptor)
- Father: David Mozart
- Relatives: Leopold Mozart (grandson), Wolfgang Amadeus Mozart (Great grandson), Hans Georg Mozart (brother)

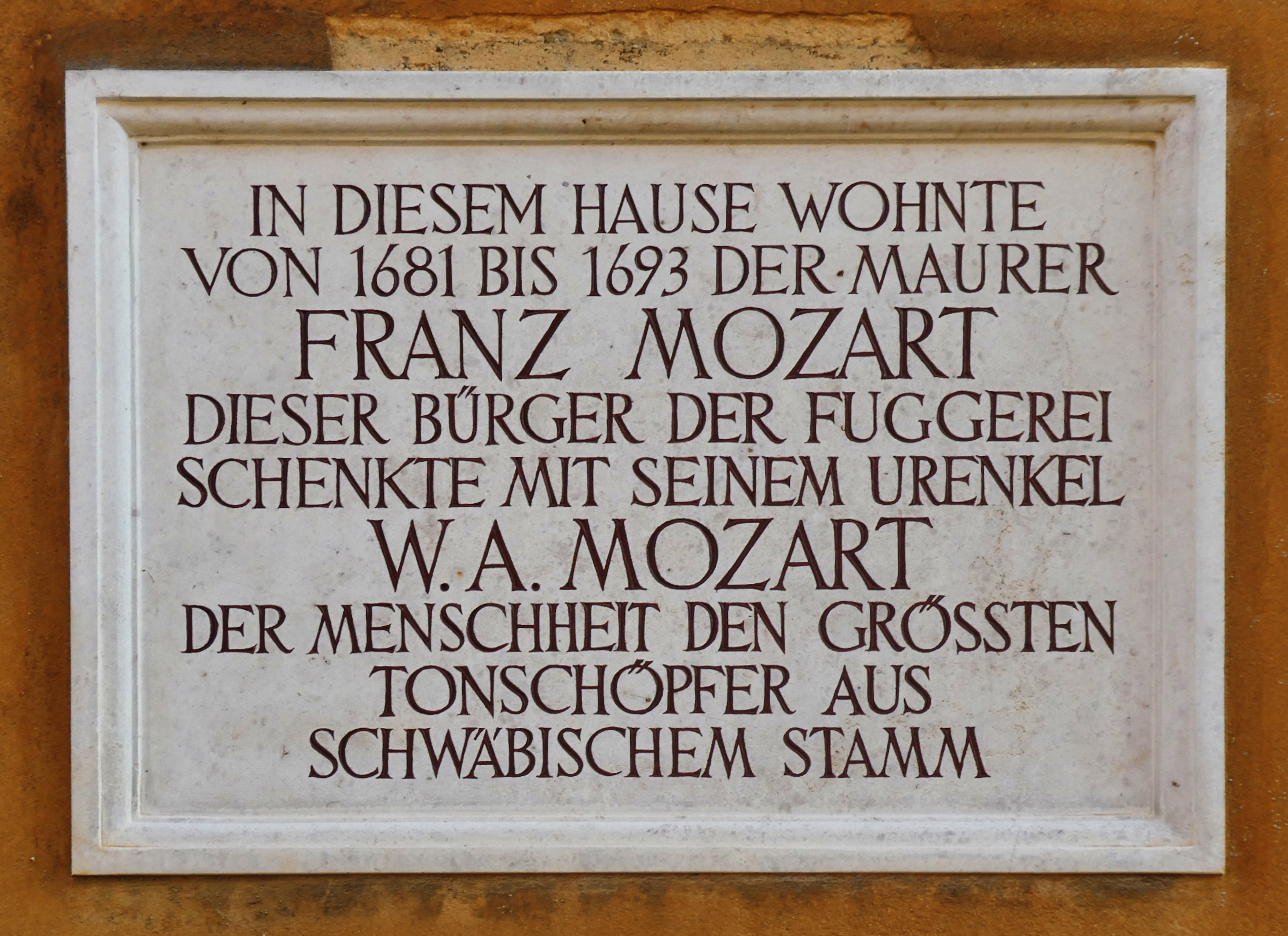
Commemorative plaque for Franz Mozart in Augsburg

Franz Mozart (3 October 1649 – 1693 or 1694) was a German mason. He was father of the bookbinder Johann Georg Mozart, the grandfather of Leopold Mozart, and the great-grandfather of Wolfgang Amadeus Mozart.

The son of bricklayer David Mozart (1621–1685), Franz worked as a master mason and lived in the Fuggerei beginning in 1681. He was born in Augsburg and died there. A commemorative plaque at his house there, Mittlere Gasse Nr. 14, commemorates him today.

Franz Mozart is not to be confused with his great-great-grandson Franz Xaver Wolfgang Mozart, the youngest son of Wolfgang Amadeus Mozart.
