= Anna Maria Mozart =

Mother of Wolfgang Amadeus Mozart

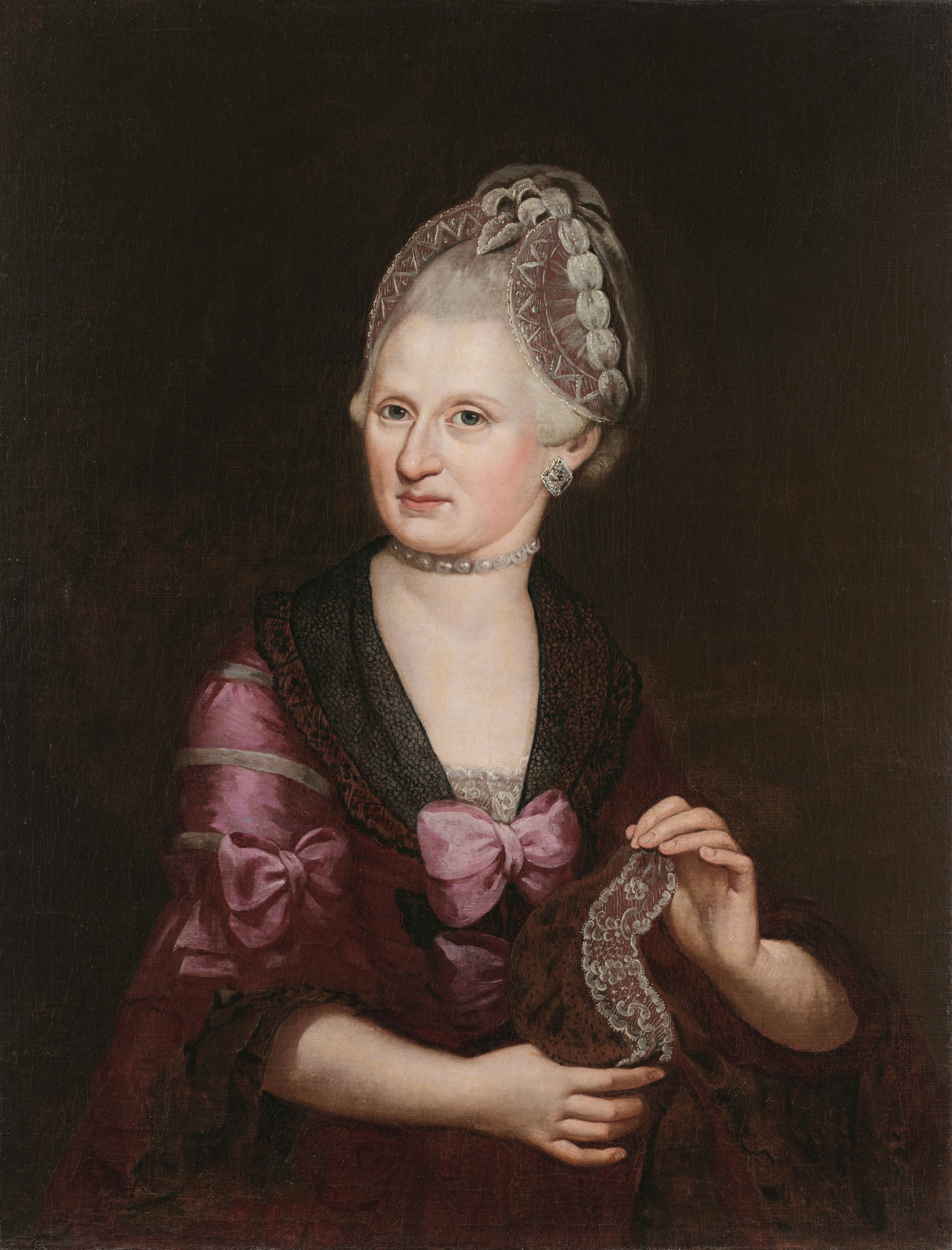
- Portrait by Rosa Hagenauer, c. 1775
- Born: Anna Maria Walburga Pertl; 25 December 1720; St. Gilgen, Prince-Archbishopric of Salzburg
- Died: 3 July 1778 (aged 57); Paris, Kingdom of France
- Burial place: Church of Saint-Eustache; 48°51′48″N 2°20′42″E
- Spouse: Leopold Mozart (m. 1747)
- Family: Pertl, Mozart

Anna Maria Walburga Mozart (née Pertl; 25 December 1720 – 3 July 1778) was the mother of Wolfgang Amadeus Mozart and Maria Anna Mozart.

== Life ==
=== Youth ===
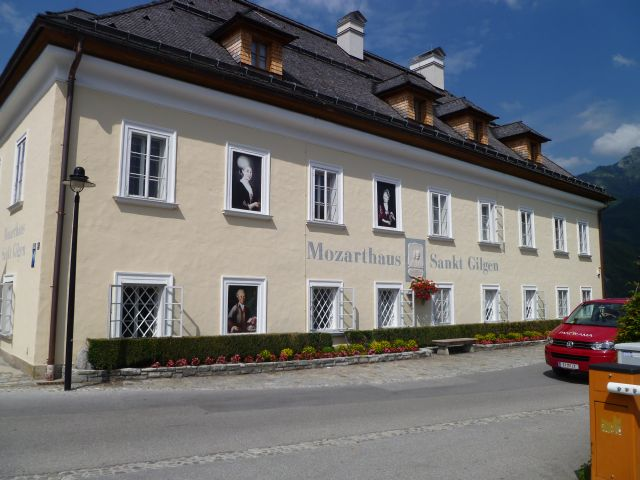
Anna Maria Mozart's birth home in St. Gilgen, now a museum

Anna Maria Pertl was born on 25 December 1720, in St. Gilgen, Archbishopric of Salzburg, to Eva Rosina and Wolfgang Nicolaus Pertl, deputy prefect of Hildenstein. Nicolaus had a university degree in jurisprudence from the Benedictine University in Salzburg and held many positions of responsibility, including district superintendent in St. Andrae. He was apparently a skilled musician, but suffered a severe illness in 1714 and had to change positions to one with a relatively small salary as deputy superintendent of Schloss Hüttenstein. During the last portion of his life, Nicolaus fell deeply into debt. He died on 7 March 1724.

Nicolaus' possessions were liquidated to help pay the debt, and his remaining family (Anna Maria's mother and her older sister Maria Rosina, born 24 August 1719) lapsed into poverty. They moved to Salzburg, not far away, and lived on a charity pension of just eight (later nine) florins per month, perhaps supplemented by low-level employment. Maria Rosina died in 1728 at age nine, while Anna Maria herself was not well when she was young, suffering from a "chronic cough" and recurring fever. Legal documents from the time describe her as "constantly ill" (1733) and "the constantly ill bedridden daughter" (1739).

=== Marriage and children ===
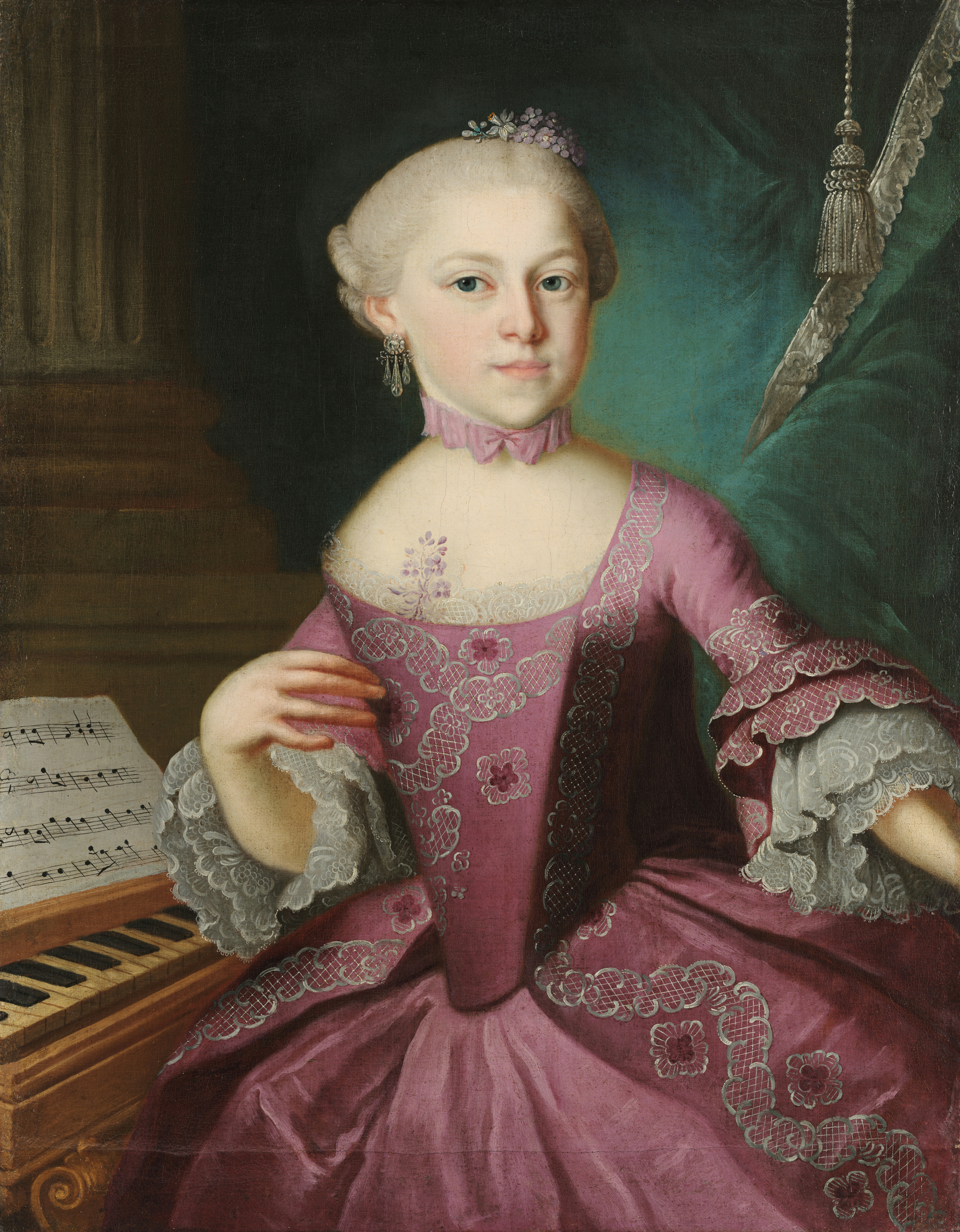
Maria Anna (Nannerl) Mozart as a child (1763), said to be by Pietro Antonio Lorenzoni

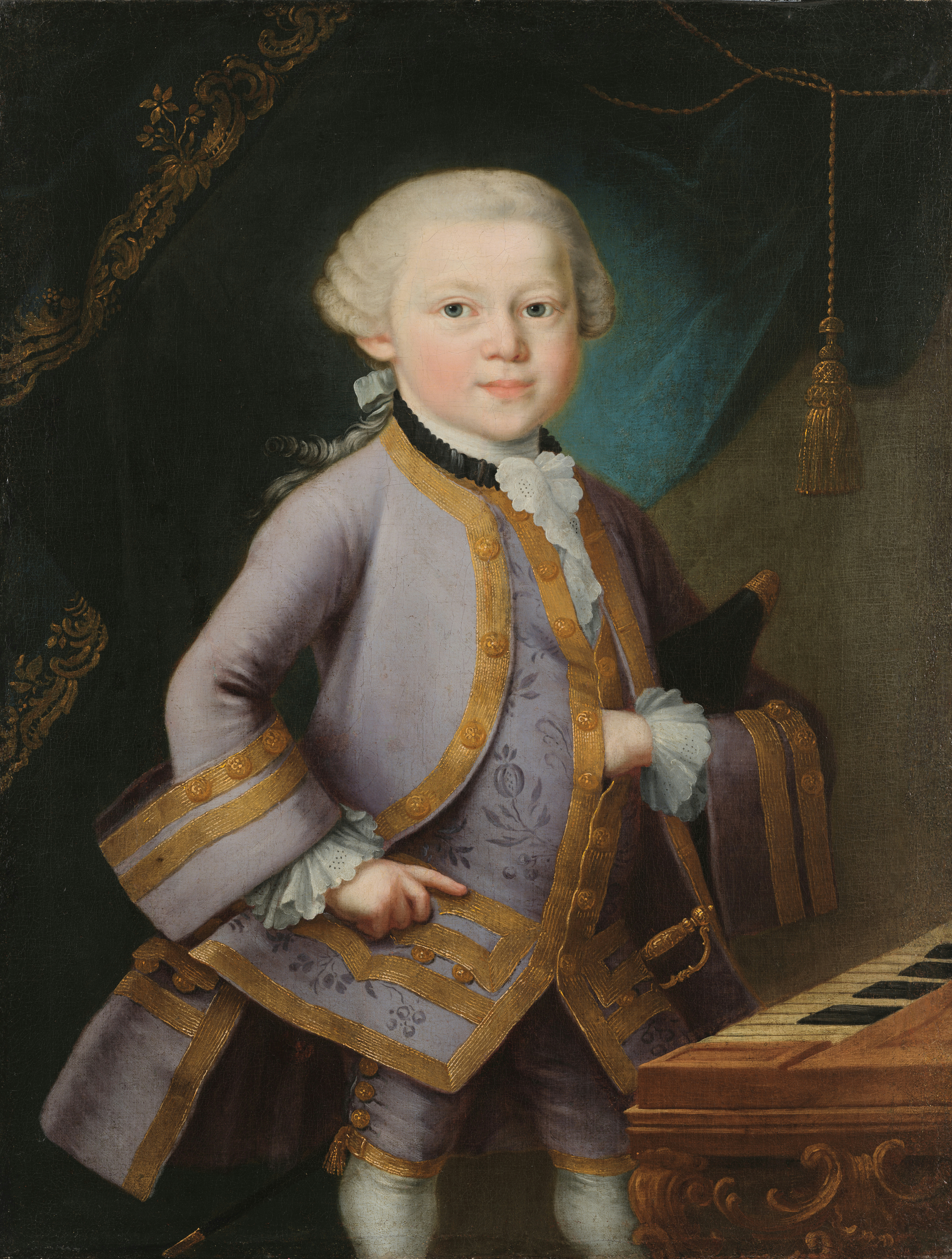
Wolfgang Amadeus Mozart as a child (1763), said to be by Pietro Antonio Lorenzoni

Anna Maria married Leopold Mozart in Salzburg on 21 November 1747. Abert wrote that "the two were regarded at the time as the handsomest couple in Salzburg." The couple moved (perhaps with Anna Maria's mother) into an apartment on the third floor of Getreidegasse 9. Their landlord was Lorenz Hagenauer, who was a close friend of Leopold's, and a frequent correspondent on the family's later travels.

Anna Maria was almost always pregnant in the first decade of her marriage, giving birth to seven children in just under eight years. However, only two of them survived infancy:

- Johann Leopold Joachim (18 August 1748 – 2 February 1749)
- Maria Anna Cordula (18 June 1749 – 24 June 1749)
- Maria Anna Nepomucena Walpurgis (13 May 1750 – 29 July 1750)
- Maria Anna Walburga Ignatia (30 July 1751 – 29 October 1829)
- Johann Karl Amadeus (4 November 1752 – 2 February 1753)
- Maria Crescentia Francisca de Paula (9 May 1754 – 27 June 1754)
- Johann Chrysostomus Wolfgang Amadeus (27 January 1756 – 5 December 1791)

Anna Maria nearly died giving birth to Wolfgang. Her womb retained the placenta, and its subsequent enforced removal at that time posed an extreme risk of fatal infection.

The two surviving children achieved fame. The daughter Maria Anna was called "Nannerl" as a child. She was a talented musician who performed with her brother on tour, but whose later life was very limited in its experiences and possibilities. The son, Wolfgang Amadeus, born 27 January 1756, achieved distinction first as a child prodigy, later as one of the most celebrated of all composers.

=== Family life ===
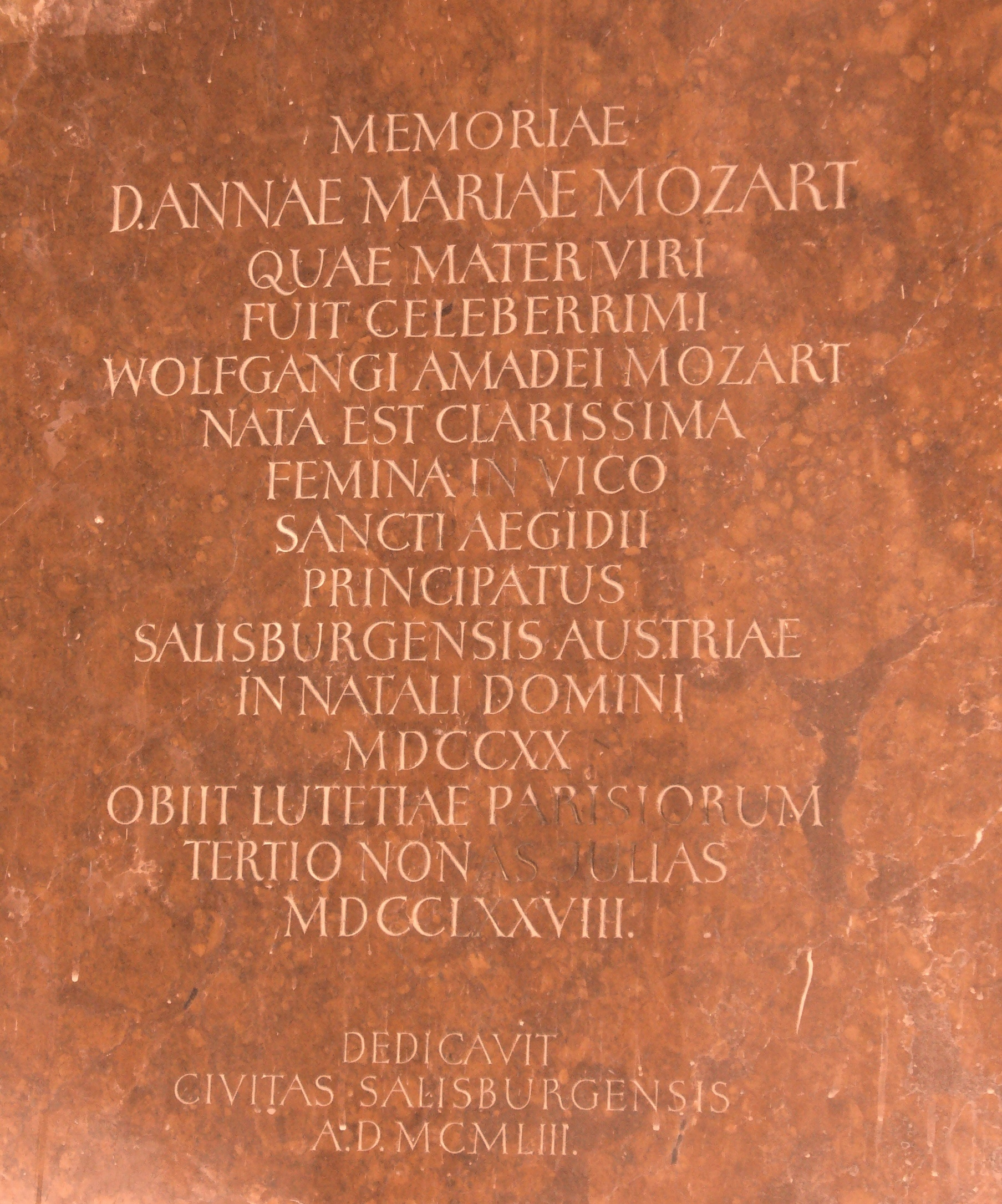
Plaque in the Saint-Eustache church in Paris

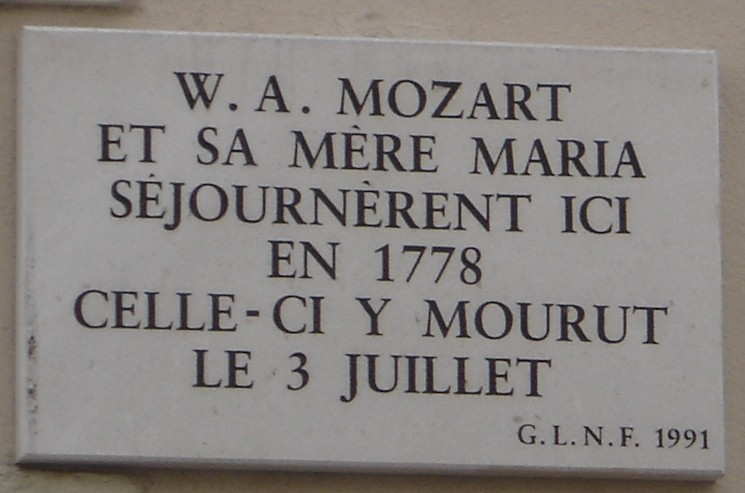
"W.A. Mozart and his mother lived in this house in 1778 – she died here on 3 July" – 8 rue du Sentier in Paris

Assessing the evidence of the surviving letters, Abert writes of Anna Maria's role as spouse: "she understood her husband's phlegmatic and painfully conscientious nature and did all she could to spare him the numerous troubles and worries that stemmed from it, a task that cannot have been easy, given his perpetual mistrust, and there is no doubt that she will have drawn a veil over many an unpleasant incident not merely out of prudence, but also from fear. She was utterly devoted to him and willingly submitted to the strict regime to which he inevitably and unquestioningly subjected her." Concerning Anna Maria as a mother, he says, "It was a pure and healthy spirit that reigned in the Mozart household... and Anna Maria must take much of the credit for this. Above all, she was a true mother to her children, who invariably sought refuge with her when their father's strict hand weighed unduly heavily upon them. Wolfgang loved and admired her to distraction." The letters record that Anna Maria participated with zest in the family's tendency toward scatological humor, a tendency seen more strongly in Wolfgang.

Anna Maria went on the series of tours (1762–1768) through Europe, during which the two children were exhibited as prodigies. She unwillingly remained in Salzburg with Nannerl during the tours of Italy that Wolfgang and Leopold took from 1769 to 1773. In 1777, Anna Maria accompanied the now-adult Wolfgang (again unwillingly) on a job-hunting tour that took him to Augsburg, Mannheim, and Paris.

=== Death ===
While in Paris, Anna Maria died on 3 July 1778 of a sudden, undiagnosed illness that lasted for 14 days. She was suffering from fever, diarrhea and headaches, had delusions, could hardly speak, and lost her hearing, "so that one had to scream". Anna Maria was buried in the cemetery of Saint-Eustache. The place where the grave once was is no longer known.

Wolfgang was deeply shocked by his mother's death. Several letters that Wolfgang wrote to his father from Paris, which are still extant, deal with this tragic event.

== Notes ==
=== References ===
- Abert, Hermann (2007) [1920]. W. A. Mozart. Translated by Stewart Spencer. newly footnoted by Cliff Eisen. New Haven: Yale University Press.
- Solomon, Maynard (1995). Mozart: A Life (1st ed.). New York: HarperCollins. ISBN 978-0-06-019046-0. OCLC 31435799.
