= Johann Georg Mozart =

German bookbinder

- Born: 4 May 1679; Augsburg, Holy Roman Empire
- Died: 19 February 1736 (aged 56); Augsburg, Holy Roman Empire
- Occupation: Bookbinder
- Spouse: Anna Maria Sulzer (m. 1719)
- Children: 8, including Leopold Mozart; Franz Alois Mozart
- Parent(s): Franz Mozart; Ana Harrer
- Relatives: Wolfgang Amadeus Mozart (grandson); Maria Anna Mozart (granddaughter); Maria Anna Thekla Mozart (granddaughter); Franz Xaver Wolfgang Mozart (great-grandson); Carl Thomas Mozart (great-grandson)

Johann Georg Mozart (4 May 1679 – 19 February 1736) was a German bookbinder who lived in Augsburg in the 17th and 18th centuries. He was the father of Leopold Mozart and the paternal grandfather of Wolfgang Amadeus Mozart.

Johann Georg was the son of Franz Mozart, a master mason. However, Johann Georg pursued a different career, becoming a master bookbinder. He evidently advanced his career when he married Anna Maria Banegger, widow of his former master, and thus obtained his old master's guild license. His first wife bore him no children and died in 1718. His second wife, whom he married in 1719, was Anna Maria Sulzer (1696–1766), with whom he had eight children over the years 1719–1735; three boys and two girls survived to adulthood. Leopold, born 14 November 1719, was the oldest.

The family were Catholics and, after 1722, lived in a house owned by the Jesuits. They sent their two oldest sons to Jesuit schools.

Neither Johann Georg nor his wife, Anna Maria, had any direct influence on the life of their celebrated grandson. Johann Georg died 20 years before Wolfgang Amadeus Mozart was born; and Leopold became estranged from his mother following his move in young adulthood to Salzburg (1737); hence there was no contact between grandmother and grandson during the period their lives overlapped.

Another son of Johann Georg, Franz Aloys Mozart (1727–1791), remained in Augsburg and followed his father's career as a bookbinder (he also occasionally published religious tracts). He was the father of Maria Anna Thekla Mozart.

Just two books are known that were bound by Johann Georg Mozart. They are two identical books: an almanach from 1718, published in Augsburg Germany. One is known in the Augsburg State Library and one is known in a private collection. These books could be purchaged at Johann Georg Mozart home in that year.
