= Mozart's starling =

Pet bird owned by Mozart

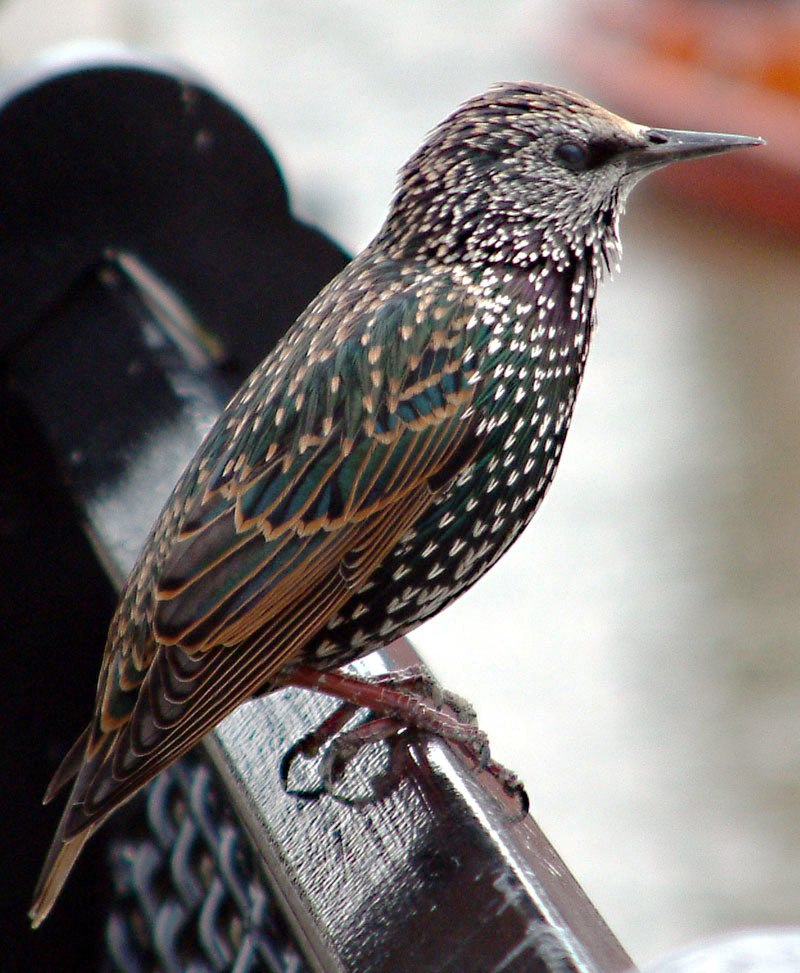
Common starling, Sturnus vulgaris

For about three years, the composer Wolfgang Amadeus Mozart kept a pet starling. The starling is remembered for the anecdote of how Mozart came to purchase it, for the funeral commemorations Mozart provided for it, and as an example of the composer's affection in general for birds.

== Purchase ==
The first record of the starling is the entry Mozart made in his expense book when he bought it on 27 May 1784:

Starling bird 34 Kr.
That was beautiful!

III. Allegretto – Presto (8:55)
Finale of the Piano Concerto K. 453

The music Mozart jotted down in the book is fairly close to the opening bars of the third movement of his Piano Concerto No. 17 in G, K. 453, which Mozart had completed a few weeks earlier (12 April). Presumably, Mozart taught the bird to sing this tune in the pet store, or wherever it was that he bought it.

According to Mozart's transcription, the starling incorrectly inserted a fermata on the last beat of the first full measure, and sang G♯ instead of G in the following measure. Correcting for those, the tune would have been:

Mozart probably was not joking when he made the transcription, because starlings are known to have a very strong capacity for vocal mimicry.

To the ears of West and King, many elements of Mozart's A Musical Joke (1787) also "bear the vocal autograph of a starling".

== Demise ==
The bird Mozart brought home lived as a pet in his household for three years and died on 4 June 1787. Mozart buried the creature in the garden with (as contemporary biographers observed) considerable ceremony. The notes taken by Georg Nikolaus von Nissen (the second husband of Mozart's wife Constanze) for purposes of writing his biography of the composer described the ceremonies thus:

When a bird died, he arranged a funeral procession, in which everyone who could sing had to join in, heavily veiled – made a sort of requiem, epitaph in verse.

The same event is described by Franz Niemetschek, who had also interviewed Constanze:

He often wrote verse himself; mostly only of a humorous kind. [fn.:] This was the case, among others, at the death of a much-loved starling, which he had given a proper gravestone in his hired garden, and on which he had written an inscription. He was very fond of animals, and – particularly – birds.

=== Funeral poem ===
Mozart's funeral poem is translated by Robert Spaethling into vernacular English as follows.

Hier ruht ein lieber Narr,
Ein Vogel Staar.
Noch in den besten Jahren
Mußt er erfahren
Des Todes bittern Schmerz.
Mir blut't das Herz,
Wenn ich daran gedenke.
O Leser! schenke
Auch du ein Thränchen ihm.
Er war nicht schlimm;
Nur war er etwas munter,
Doch auch mitunter
Ein lieber loser Schalk,
Und drum kein Dalk.
Ich wett', er ist schon oben,
Um mich zu loben
Für diesen Freundschaftsdienst
Ohne Gewinnst.
Denn wie er unvermuthet
Sich hat verblutet,
Dacht er nicht an den Mann,
Der so schön reimen kann.

— June 4, 1787. Mozart
Translation:

Here rests a bird called Starling,
A foolish little Darling.
He was still in his prime
When he ran out of time,
And my sweet little friend
Came to a bitter end,
Creating a terrible smart
Deep in my heart.
Gentle Reader! Shed a tear,
For he was dear,
Sometimes a bit too jolly
And, at times, quite folly,
But nevermore
A bore.
I bet he is now up on high
Praising my friendship to the sky,
Which I render
Without tender;
For when he took his sudden leave,
Which brought to me such grief,
He was not thinking of the man
Who writes and rhymes as no one can.

— tr. Spaethling

=== Interpretations ===
West and King note, based on their extensive experience, that starling pets interact closely with their human keepers, often causing their owners to bond with them. Thus, Mozart's expression of sorrow, though comic, is likely to have been quite sincere. Spaethling offers further background:

Mozart's poem on the death of his beloved pet bird ... is humorous, bittersweet, and self-reflective at a time of great loss and grief. His father had passed away, a close friend had died young, and he himself was deeply involved with Don Giovanni, his darkest comedy.

In 2003, Wolfgang Mieder posited that the composer may have been (subconciously or not) been writing an autobiographical poem about himself:

Is this really nothing but an occasional poem, or is Mozart speaking here, albeit indirectly, about his own fate in life? After all, with his thirty-one years he too is "in the prime", though his musical and much praised services remain "without pay". Impoverished, "his breath is choked". In German, the poem states that "he bleeds to death", and, like his bird, he enjoys playing the buffoon or clown in addition to playing his music. Ten years earlier Mozart had expressed his fooleries more coarsely with scatological vocabulary in a letter to his father on 25 October 1777: "Well, addio. I again kiss Papa's hands and embrace my sister and send greetings to all my good friends; and now off to the closet [little shit house] run I, where perchance shit some muck shall I, and ever the same fool am I." (342)

== Other birds ==
There is evidence that the starling Mozart acquired in 1784 was hardly the only pet bird whose company he enjoyed.

At age 14, Mozart wrote home from Naples to his sister Nannerl in Salzburg (19 May 1770) when he was on a journey with his father Leopold:

Write me, how is Mr. Canary? Does he still sing? Does he still pipe? Do you know why I am thinking of the canary? Because there is one in our anteroom that makes the same little sounds as ours.

A later letter, written by Nannerl to her mother at home in Salzburg as she visited Munich in 1775 with Wolfgang and Leopold, indicates other birds in Mozart's childhood home:

Thank God we are quite well. I hope that Mamma too is very well. A propos, are the canary, the tomtits, and the robin redbreast still alive, or have they let the birds starve?

A sad tale from 1791 is told by Mozart's biographer Hermann Abert, concerning another canary that might been a successor to the starling, being in Mozart's family when the composer lay on his deathbed.

It was with great reluctance that he agreed to have his pet canary removed, first to the adjacent room, then even further away, because he could no longer bear the sound of its singing.

== See also ==
- List of individual birds
