= Mozart's name =

The composer Wolfgang Amadeus Mozart went by many different names in his lifetime. This resulted partly from the church traditions of the day, and partly from Mozart being multilingual and freely adapting his name to other languages.

== Baptismal record ==
Mozart was baptized as Joannes Chrysostomus Wolfgangus Theophilus Mozart on 28 January 1756, the day after his birth, at St. Rupert's Cathedral in Salzburg. The baptismal register of the cathedral parish contains the entry shown below, written down in Latin by city chaplain Leopold Lamprecht. A transcription with editorial additions by Otto Erich Deutsch follows.

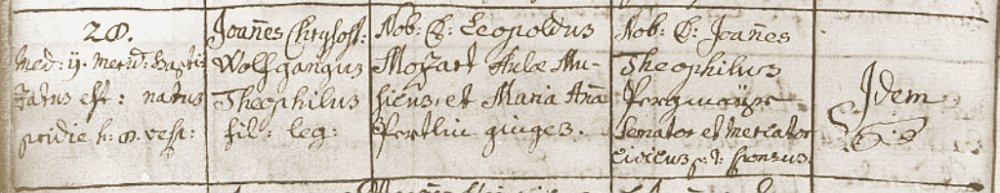
Mozart's baptismal record

[Januarius] 28. med[ia hora] 11. merid[iana] baptizatus est : natus pridie h[ora] 8. vesp[ertina]	Joan̄es Chrysost[omus] Wolfgangus Theophilus fil[ius] leg[itimus]	Nob[ilis] D[ominus] Leopoldus Mozart Aulæ Musicus, et Maria Anna Pertlin coniuges	Nob[ilis] D[ominus] Joannes Theophilus Pergmaÿr Senator et Mercator civicus p[ro] t[empore] sponsus	Idem [= Leopoldus Lamprecht Capellanus Civicus]
[January] 28. ha[lf 'til] 11, mid[day], was baptized: born the previous day in the 8th ho[ur] of the even[ing]	Johannes Chrysost[omus] Wolfgang Theophilus, leg[itimate] s[on]	the Nob[le] L[ord] Leopold Mozart, court musician, and Maria Anna Pertlin [his] wife	the Nob[le] L[ord] Johannes Theophilus Pergmaÿr, senator and city merchant, sponsor f[or the] p[resent time] [i.e., godfather]	as was signed above, [Leopold Lamprecht, Civic Chaplain]

Mozart's father Leopold announced the birth of his son in a letter to the publisher Johann Jakob Lotter with the words "... the boy is called Joannes Chrisostomus, Wolfgang, Gottlieb" ("der Bub heißt Joannes Chrisostomus, Wolfgang, Gottlieb" in German). The baptismal names "Joannes" and "Chrysostomus" also have German equivalents, namely "Johann" and "Chrysostomos" (or less frequently, "Chrysostom"). The widely used Grove Dictionary of Music and Musicians employs these versions in the heading name for its Mozart article, which parenthesizes the little-used baptismal names: "(Johann Chrysostom) Wolfgang Amadeus Mozart."

Here are the details of the various names given on the register:

- Mozart's first two baptismal names, "Joannes Chrysostomus", represent his saint's name, following the custom of the Catholic Church. They result from his birthday, 27 January, being the feast day of St. John Chrysostom. The document also records that Mozart was of legitimate birth and gives the names of his parents and his father Leopold's occupation as court musician. The first paragraph indicates that the baptism took place at 10:30 in the morning, and that Mozart had been born at 20:00 the night before. The baptismal name "Joannes Chrysostomus" was in conformance to Catholic custom and was not used by Mozart in everyday life. "Chrysostomus" means "golden mouth."
- "Wolfgangus" is "Wolfgang", (Note: The etymological origin of "Wolfgang" is "hero encountering a wolf which announces victory".) adapted to the Latin used in the parish register. Mozart used "Wolfgang" in German-speaking contexts. Wolfgang was the name of his maternal grandfather, Wolfgang Nikolaus Pertl.
- "Theophilus" comes from Greek and is variously rendered as "lover of God" or "loved by God." "Gottlieb" is its German form, and the familiar "Amadeus" is its Latin form. In later life, Mozart himself would use the Italian and French equivalents, respectively "Amadeo" and "Amadé". "Theophilus" was a name of Mozart's godfather, the merchant Joannes Theophilus Pergmayr, whose presence is recorded in the fourth paragraph.

== Later life ==
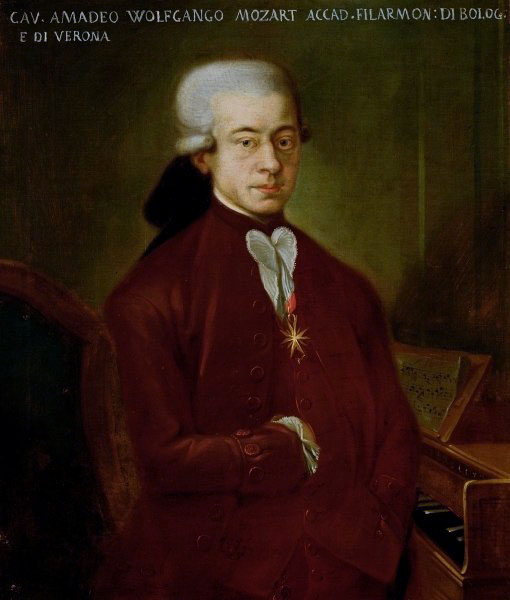
1777 portrait of Mozart

The musicologist Otto Erich Deutsch, who studied all available letters and documents about Mozart, arrived at the following conclusion about what he had called himself: "In Italy, from 1770, Mozart called himself 'Wolfgango Amadeo', and from about 1777, 'Wolfgang Amadè'."

The use of multiple language versions of the same name was common in Mozart's day. Joseph Haydn went by "Joseph" (German, English and French), "Josephus" (Latin) and "Giuseppe" (Italian); and Ludwig van Beethoven published his works as "Luigi" (Italian) and as "Louis" (French).

Mozart's preference for "Wolfgang Amadè" can be seen on the wedding contract for his marriage to Constanze Weber, dated August 3, 1782, where his signature says "Wolfgang Amadè Mozart". In the St. Stephen's parish register entry for the marriage, dated August 4, Mozart is referred to as "Herr Wolfgang Adam Mozart", which is a different name but probably a misspelling for "Amadé" (or Amadeus).

Mozart spelled "Amadè" variously in regard to the accent on the final letter. Robert Spaethling, who translated many of Mozart's letters, writes, he "is especially nonchalant in his placement of Italian and French accents: sometime he writes 'chèr papa', at other times 'chér papa,' (Note: French for 'Dear papa'. Modern French usage is accentless.) and even his own name appears variously as 'Amadé', 'Amadè', and plain 'Amade'."

Mozart's preference for "Amadè" was not in general respected by others. Frequently, he was called either "Wolfgang Amadeus" or "Wolfgang Gottlieb". Here are examples:

- The day Mozart died, his name was entered in the death records of the Vienna Magistrate as "Wolfgang Amadeus". This is the earliest posthumous source that uses the Latin version of his name. In this time it was common practice to use a Latinized form for all death records.
- In a letter dated December 11, 1791, Mozart's widow Constanze, in severe financial straits, asked to be given a pension by the Emperor (the appeal was ultimately successful). She signed herself "Konstantia Mozart, née Weber, widow relict of the late Wolfgang Amadeus Mozart." Imperial officials, replying to her request, used the same name.
- A benefit concert for Mozart's family was held in Prague on December 28, 1791, billed as "Concert in memory of Wolfgang Gottlieb Mozart".

The signature on the autograph scores is commonly "(di) Wolfgango Amadeo Mozart", although sometimes "Amadeo Wolfgango Mozart" is seen, for example on Symphony No. 1 and the Haffner Symphony. The violin concertos also show this variation, with the autographs of numbers 1 (K. 207) and 3 (K. 216) autographs in Krakow showing "Amadeo Wolfgango" and the remaining, including Violin Concerto No. 5 (K. 219) held at the U.S. Library of Congress, showing the more common Wolfgango Amadeo.

== The rise of "Amadeus" ==
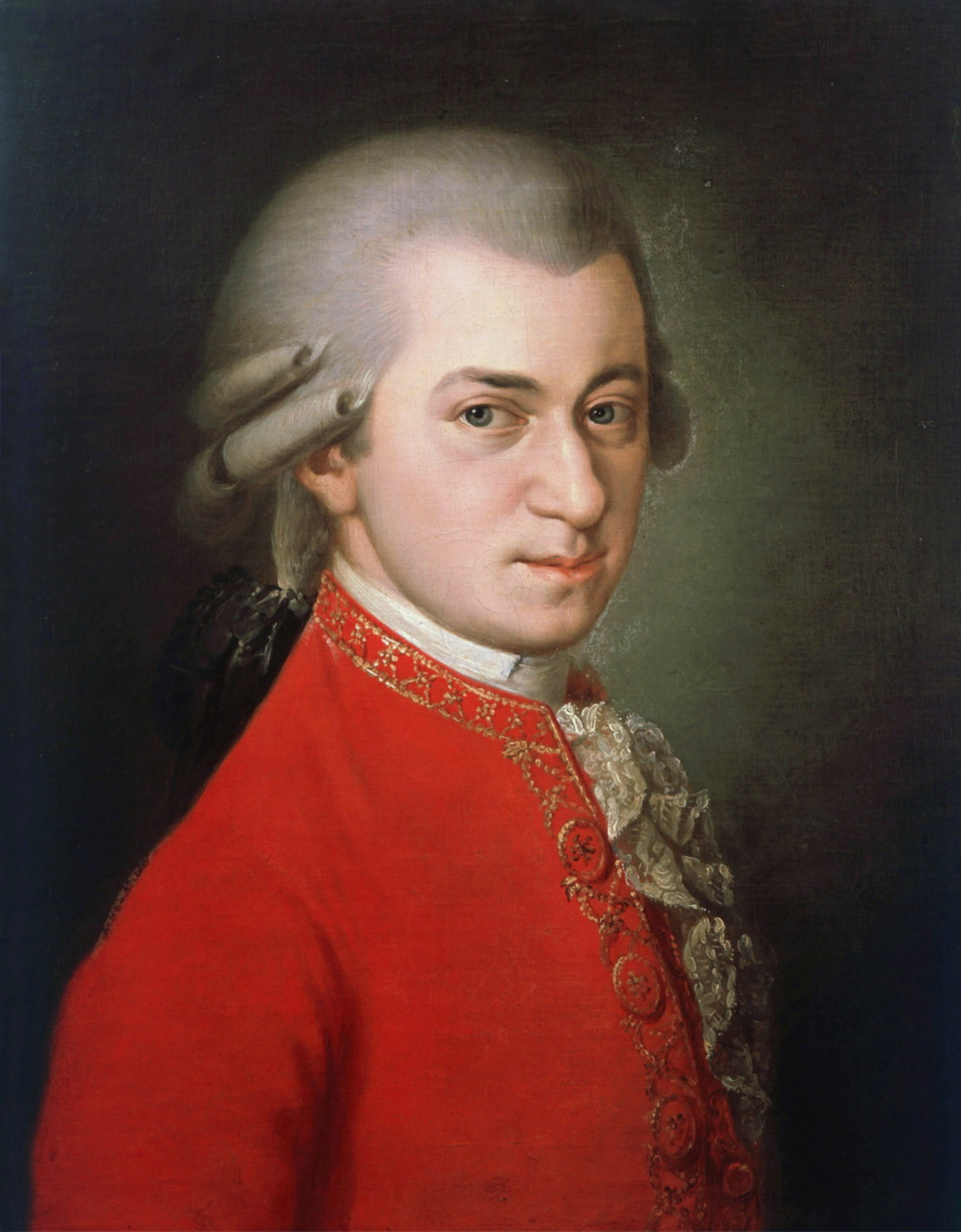
Krafft's posthumous 1819 Mozart portrait

It is possible that the now-standard "Amadeus" originated as a facetious name. He signed some letters in mock Latin as "Wolfgangus Amadeus Mozartus"; this was certainly no accident as in one letter he did the same to the date of the letter as well: adding "-us" to the end of each word. For example, he begins a 1777 letter in a facetious manner, confessing that "[he] Johannes, Chrysostomus, Amadeus, Wolfgangus, Sigismundus, Mozart" pleads "guilty to" staying up past midnight making up "doggerel rhymes" with friends. But he never signed any letter as "Wolfgang Amadeus Mozart" himself.

Mozart's only mention as "Wolfgang Amadeus" in an official document made during his lifetime was found in 1998 by Mozart scholar Michael Lorenz in the registers of the Lower Austrian Governorship, where in May 1787 "Mozart Wolfgang Amadeus" is referred to as having applied for the return of his written surety for his friend Franz Jakob Freystädtler. Other uses of "Amadeus", from immediately after Mozart's death in 1791, are given above.

The 19th century saw the gradual victory of "Amadeus" over alternative middle names. The earliest (18th century) biographers of Mozart, such as Friedrich Schlichtegroll and Franz Niemetschek, used "Gottlieb". However, in 1798 the publishing firm of Breitkopf & Härtel began to issue a (partial) Complete Works edition under the name "Amadeus". The dominance of "Amadeus" began around about 1810; Romanticism, notably in the person of E. T. A. Hoffmann, "seized upon this name to proclaim its veneration for Mozart". Although various scholars since that time have made use of "Amadè" or "Gottlieb", "Amadeus" remains by far the most familiar term for the general public.

== Facetious names ==
In his frequently playful letters, Mozart would sometimes spell words backwards, e.g. "oidda. – gnagflow Trazom. neiw ned 12 tsugua 3771" for "addio. – wolfgang Mozart. wien den 21 august 1773".

In 1777, the 21-year-old Mozart also pranked a Herr Stein by denying his identity and introducing himself as "Trazom", then running to a piano and playing quickly to surprise Herr Stein.

The same year, he concluded a letter to his father with,

Well, addio. I again kiss Papa's hands and embrace my sister and send greetings to all my good friends; now off to the closet run I, where perchance shit some muck shall I, and ever the same fool am I. Wolfgang and Amadeus Mozarty, Augsburg, Octobery 25th, seventeen hundred and seventy seveny. Nun addio. ich küsse dem papa nochmahlen die hände, und meine schwester umarme ich, und allen guten freünden und freündinen empfehle ich mich, und auf das heisel nun begieb ich mich, und einen dreck vielleicht scheisse ich, und der nähmliche narr bleibe ich, Wolfgang et Amadeus Mozartich, augspurg den 25 octobrich, 1700 Siebenzigich.

This shows both his scatological humour as well as his affinity for humorous misspellings, including that of "seveny" and his own name ("Mozarty").

See above for the possible origin of "Amadeus" as jocular.
