= Biographies of Mozart =

Wolfgang Amadeus Mozart died after a short illness on 5 December 1791, aged 35. His reputation as a composer, already strong during his lifetime, rose rapidly in the years after his death, and he became (and has remained to this day) one of the most celebrated of all composers.

Shortly after Mozart's death, biographers began to piece together accounts of his life, relying on the testimony of those still living who knew him, as well as surviving correspondence. The creation of Mozart biographies has been an activity of scholars ever since.

== Early biographers ==
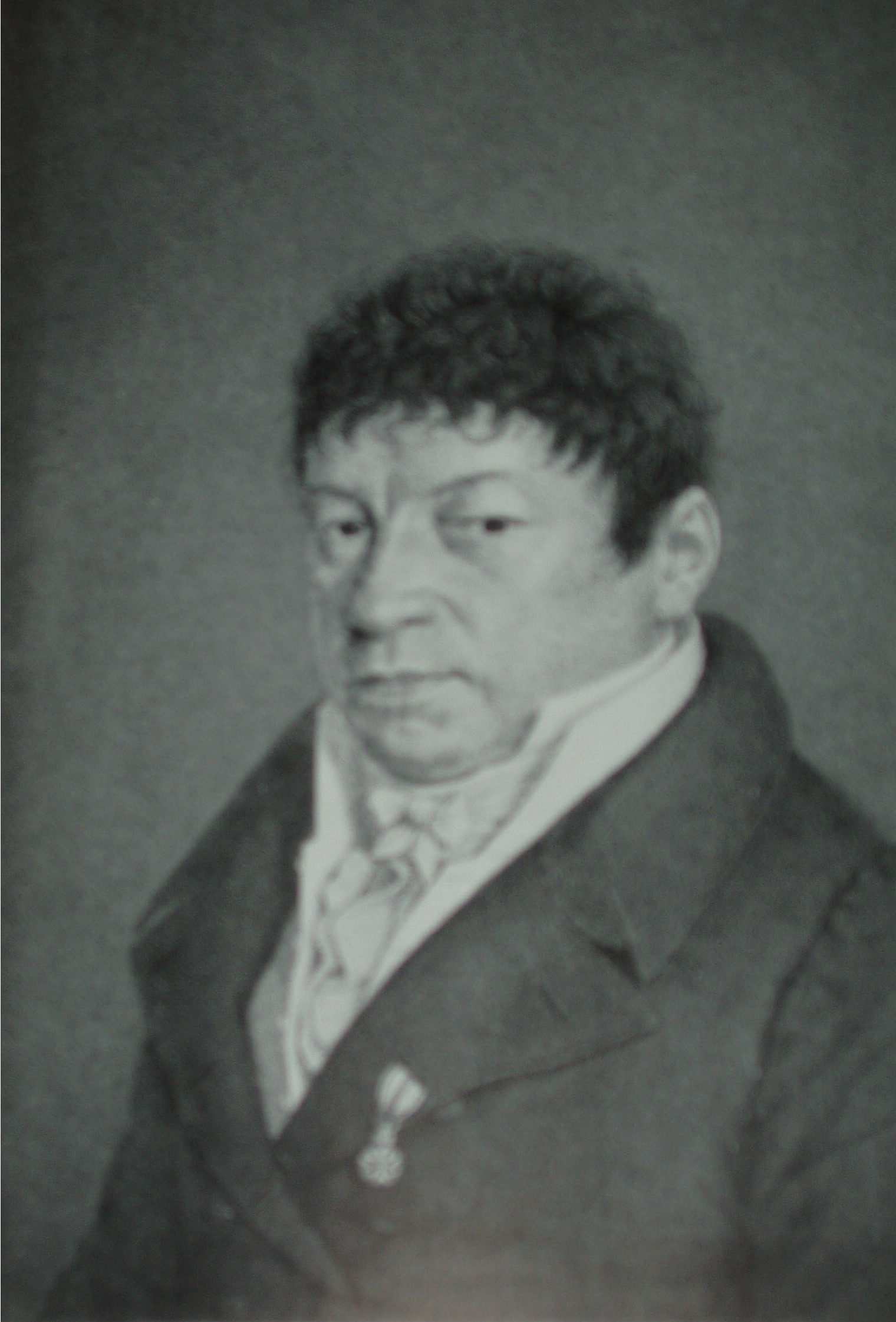
Friedrich Schlichtegroll; artist unknown

Friedrich Schlichtegroll was a teacher and a scholar who published Mozart's obituary in 1793. The obituary was part of a volume of obituaries referred to as Nekrolog. The two had never met. Most of the information was obtained from Nannerl, Mozart's sister, and Johann Andreas Schachtner, a friend of the family in Mozart's early years. Therefore, what Schlichtegroll knew and wrote about was the period before Vienna.

Franz Xaver Niemetschek was a citizen of Prague, a teacher and writer. Niemetschek allegedly met with Mozart and claimed to have been acquainted with Mozart's friends in Prague. After Mozart's death, his widow Constanze sent Carl, the elder son, to live with him from 1792-97. Through these relationships with the family, Niemetschek gathered the information needed to write a biography of Mozart. His main source was Constanze and Mozart's friends in Prague. Therefore, his emphasis was on Mozart's years in Vienna and his many trips to Prague. Based on research by Austrian scholar Walther Brauneis, much doubt has recently been cast on the veracity of Niemetschek's claim that he actually made Mozart's personal acquaintance.

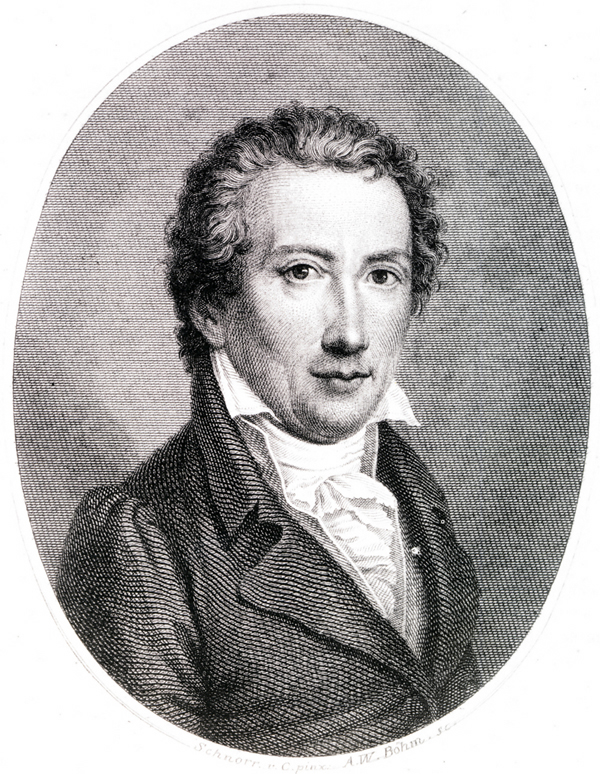
Friedrich Rochlitz, portrait by Veit Hanns Schnorr von Carolsfeld, c. 1820

Friedrich Rochlitz was the editor of the Allgemeine musikalische Zeitung (AMZ), a journal published by Breitkopf & Hartel. Motivated by the wish to publicize the company's edition in progress of the composer's works, he published a number of anecdotes about Mozart, many of them vivid and entertaining. However, since the research of Maynard Solomon in 1991, Mozart scholars have considered Rochlitz's stories so contaminated by Rochlitz's own fictional additions that they must be considered completely unreliable. They continue to play a role in forming the popular image of the composer.

I. T. F. C. Arnold, an author of Gothic novels, wrote Mozart's Geist, published in Erfurt in 1803. According to William Stafford, the work is "almost entirely plagiarized from Schlichtegroll, Niemetschek, and perhaps Rochlitz"; Stafford does not trust any other material that appears in this work, though he notes that some of it was adopted for appearance in later Mozart biographies.

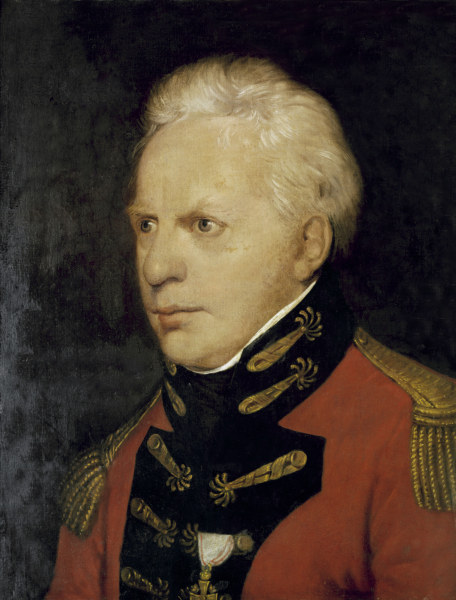
Georg Nikolaus Nissen. Painting by Ferdinand Jagemann, 1809

Georg Nikolaus Nissen was the second husband of Mozart's wife Constanze. Both he and Constanze had a strong interest in Mozart biography. They were able to pursue this interest following Nissen's retirement from the Danish civil service, when the couple moved to Salzburg (where Mozart had lived for much of his life up to age 25). Much of the Nissen biography included what had been previously written by Schlichtegroll, Niemetschek, and Rochlitz, but Nissen also had access to a great number of Mozart family letters given him by Nannerl. Nissen died in 1826 having only written a small portion of the work, and it was completed (1828) from his notes by others. Stafford (1993) writes: "Sometimes Nissen corrects the chunks he borrows, and occasionally he tells the reader that he has done this ... unfortunately, he does not always correct and revise in this way. Assembling his narrative with scissors and paste, he allows contradictions to creep in."

Vincent and Mary Novello made a pilgrimage to Salzburg in 1829, to visit Mozart's surviving relatives and to provide financial support to Nannerl (whom they mistakenly imagined to be impoverished). They did interviews of Nannerl, Constanze, and Mozart's sister-in-law Sophie Haibel, but never converted this material into a biography. The diaries were discovered and published in 1955.

== Later biographies ==
A very important Mozart biography was that published in 1856 by Otto Jahn. Jahn brought a new standard of scholarship to the field. It is still active as a scholarly document, circulating in versions revised first by Hermann Abert, then by the contemporary Mozart scholar Cliff Eisen.

The Mozart scholar Otto Erich Deutsch produced (English version 1965) a widely cited "documentary" biography, in which most of the material is reprinted documentary evidence, tied together by Deutsch's own commentary. A follow-up volume with additional documents was published in 1991 by Eisen.

A great number of additional biographies exist, of which notably recent ones include those by Marcia Davenport, Volkmar Braunbehrens, Maynard Solomon, and Ruth Halliwell.

== Adding to the documentary evidence ==
An important 20th century trend was the use of careful analysis of both handwriting and watermarks to provide more accurate (and often, surprising) dates for the works Mozart composed. Two standouts were Wolfgang Plath, who analyzed handwriting; and Alan Tyson, who mastered the exacting methodology for interpreting watermarks. The two often obtained converging evidence; Sadie writes, "the very fact that the two methods have on almost every occasion borne each other out strongly implies that each of them is actually more precise than its protagonist could dare claim."

21st century scholarship has made clear that the old government archives and parish records have by no means been fully exhausted for the purpose of finding out new facts about Mozart. Work by Michael Lorenz has established the correct name of the person for whom the Ninth Piano Concerto was written; also the surprising information that Mozart was living in spacious, expensive suburban quarters at a time when conventional scholarship asserted that he had moved to the suburbs to cope with poverty. A web site launched by Dexter Edge and David Black continues the tradition established by Deutsch and Eisen, with a compilation of newly discovered or noticed documents.

Mozart lived his life in complex society and culture, where many of the details of ordinary life were very different from the way they are today. Some modern Mozart scholars have attempted to increase our understanding by delving into the available information about Mozart's own life context. Dexter Edge writes,

Careful contextual readings of [Mozart's] Viennese letters have been few, perhaps because Mozart is such a towering figure that most historians and musicians have tended to see him as the sun around which all else revolved, and they have therefore paid little attention to the mundane contexts in which he lived, composed, and corresponded. Mozart was, of course, a supreme musical genius, ... but he was also a man, living in day-to-day world of traditions, practices, and constraints. ... Thus my readings of his letters and those of his family will often deal with quite mundane contextual matters, such as days of the week, exchange rates, and current events. ... Often enough, we shall find that the implications of such simple matters have been overlooked.

In connection with this effort to understand the context of Mozart's life, Edge approvingly cites the work of Halliwell (1998) as well as studies by Michael Lorenz.

== Revisionism in Mozart biography ==
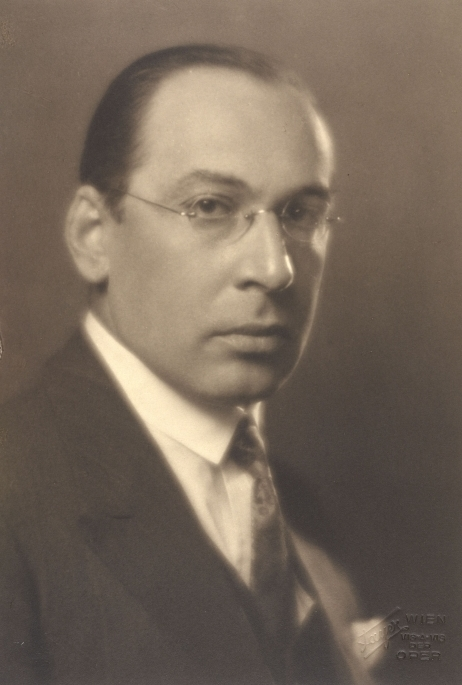
Alfred Einstein

Another trend in modern Mozart biography is to reject certain earlier claims as credulous and romanticized. The older tradition of scholarship is criticized by David J. Buch thus:

The composer's deification in the pantheon of German 'masters' following his death, and his subsequent association with burgeoning German national identity, led to hagiography. When the holes in Mozart's biography needed plugging, rumor and imagination filled the gaps.

A possible instance of romanticizing is the belief that Mozart wrote his last symphonies not with the goal of performances and income, but as an "appeal to eternity" (Alfred Einstein); a claim that has been argued against by Neal Zaslaw on factual grounds; for detailed discussion see Symphony No. 40 (Mozart) § Premiere.

Recent scholarship has also shown an increased reluctance to take historical documents at face value when their author had strong reasons to deviate from the truth. For instance, Constanze Mozart had strong motivation to paint a tragic picture of her husband's final decline and demise, since she was seeking both a pension from the Emperor and income from memorial benefit concerts. Cliff Eisen, inserting footnotes in Hermann Abert's book, expresses sharp skepticism about Constanze's account of the end of Mozart's life, contradicting the more credulous view of Abert; for details see Death of Mozart. The content of Mozart's letters also receives a very different interpretation under the view that they often reflect a desire to placate, and reduce the alarm of, his stern father Leopold; this view is put forth, for instance, by Schroeder (1999).

Revisionism is, perhaps, likely to continue. Assessing the whole tradition of Mozart biography, Andrew Steptoe concludes:

There is little doubt that successive generations of scholars have been sincere in their views of the composer, each claiming to be more 'objective' than the last, stripping away the veneer of speculation to arrive at 'the real man'. It is sobering to realize that these different opinions about Mozart as a person are all based on a very similar set of data.
