= Dexter Edge =

Dexter Edge (born in Tacoma, Washington, 20 January 1953) is an American musicologist.

== Academic career ==
Dexter Edge attended The Evergreen State College (BA, Interdisciplinary Arts). He studied music history at the University of Southern California (1983-2001, Ph.D., 2001). He has taught music history at the Louisiana State University 1997-1999. 2002-2005 he was Senior Editor at the Packard Humanities Institute (The Complete Works of Carl Philip Emanuel Bach). He was a 2006 Fellow of the American Council of Learned Societies, and the "William J. Bouwsma" Fellow at the National Humanities Center (2006-2007). The recipient of an "Alvin H. Johnson AMS 50 Fellowship," Edge has published numerous scholarly articles on Joseph Haydn and Wolfgang Amadeus Mozart. He is an authority on Mozart’s autograph manuscripts and an accomplished pianist. His scholarly work has appeared in such publications as The Cambridge Opera Journal, Revue de Musicologie, Mozart Jahrbuch, Eighteenth-Century Music, and the Journal of the Royal Musical Association. He has also presented papers at the Annual Meeting of the American Musicological Society, the International Musicological Society, and the Mozart Society of America. Edge was also the executive editor of MUSA (Music of the United States of America).

Since 2014, he has collaborated with David Black on an online edition in progress of newly discovered Mozart documents.

== Ph.D. thesis ==
- Mozart's Viennese Copyists Ph.D. University of Southern California (2001) XLIV, 2416 p.

== Editions ==
- Le nozze di Figaro K. 492; facsimile of the autograph score, Staatsbibliothek zu Berlin - Preußischer Kulturbesitz, Biblioteka Jagiellońska Kraków (Mus. ms. autogr. W. A. Mozart 492), Stanford University Library, the Juilliard School Library. Los Altos, California; Packard Humanities Institute; Kassel Bärenreiter, 2007.
- Carl Philipp Emanuel Bach: The Complete Works.

== Research articles ==
- "Mozart's Fee for 'Così fan tutte'," Journal of the Royal Musical Association 116/2 (1991), 211-235.
- (with Janet K. Page), "A newly uncovered autograph sketch for Mozart's "Al desio di chi t'adora' K 577," The Musical Times 132 (1991), No. 1786, 601-606.
- "Mozart's Viennese orchestras," Early Music 20 (1992), 64-88.
- "Mozart's reception in Vienna, 1787-1791," in Wolfgang Amadè Mozart. Essays on his Life and his Music, ed. Stanley Sadie (Oxford: Clarendon Press 1996), 66-117.
- "A newly discovered autograph source for Mozart's aria, K. 365a (Anh. 11a)," Mozart-Jahrbuch 1996 (Salzburg: Internationale Stiftung Mozarteum 1996), 177-196.
- "Recent Discoveries in Viennese Copies of Mozart's Concertos," in Mozart's Piano Concertos: Text, Context, Interpretation, ed. Neal Zaslaw (Ann Arbor: The University of Michigan Press, 1996), 51-65.
- "Manuscript Parts as Evidence of Orchestral Size in the Eighteenth-Century Viennese Concerto," in Mozart's Piano Concertos: Text, Context, Interpretation ed. Neal Zaslaw (Ann Arbor: The University of Michigan Press, 1996), 427-460.
- "Viennese music copyists and the transmission of music in the eighteenth century," Revue de musicologie 84/2 (1998), 298-304.
- "The digital imaging of watermarks," Computing in musicology 12 (1999-2000), 261-274.
- "Attributing Mozart. I: Three accompanied recitatives," Cambridge Opera Journal 13/3 (2001), 197-237.
- "Not Mozart, Not Zoffany. So . . . What?" Guest essay in Michael Lorenz's musicology blog (2013).

Many are available through Edge's profile on academia.edu.
