= Wolfgang Amadeus Mozart =

Composer and musician (1756–1791)

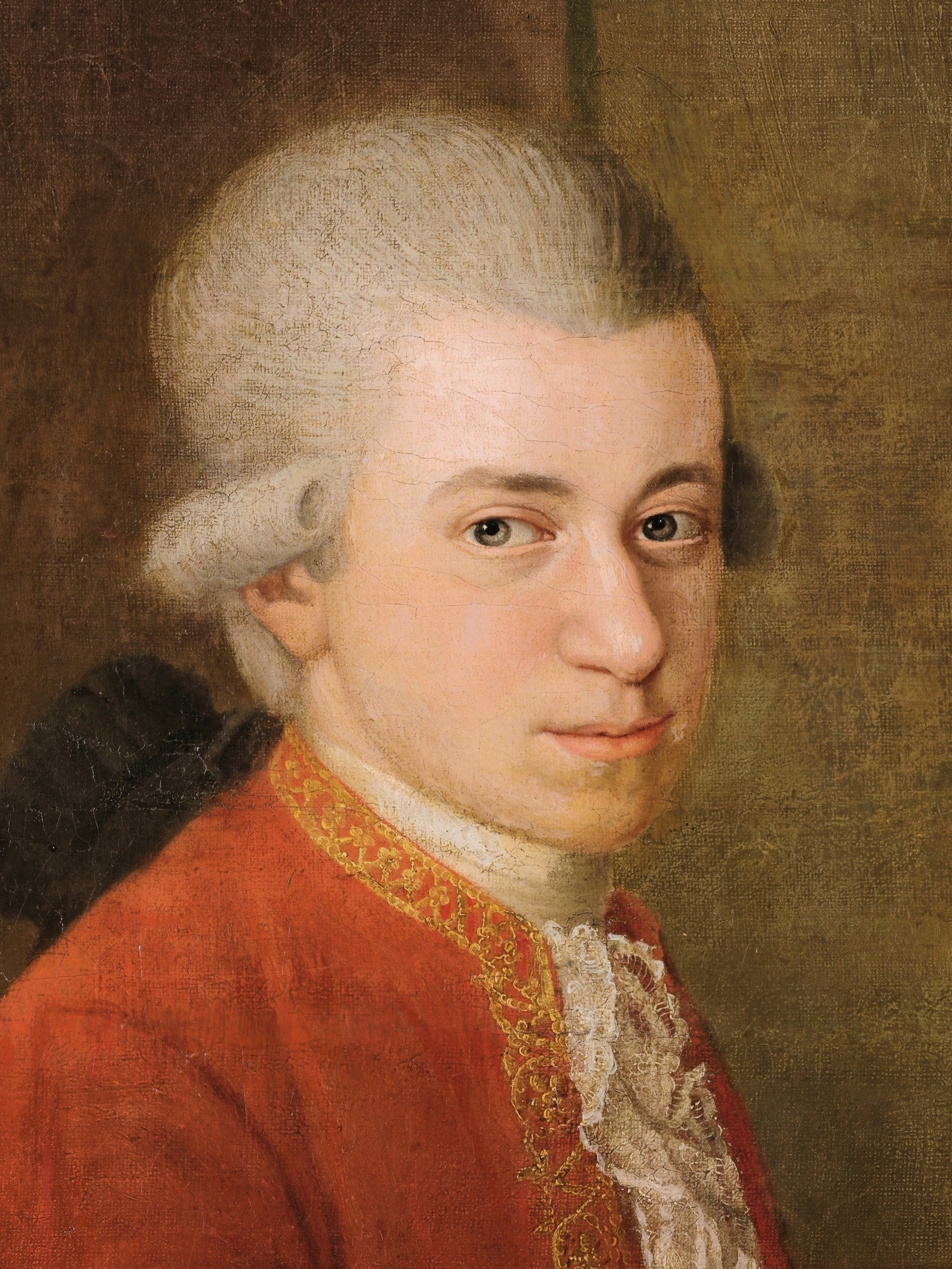
- Detail from Portrait of the Mozart Family, c. 1781
- Born: 27 January 1756; Salzburg, Archbishopric of Salzburg
- Died: 5 December 1791 (aged 35); Vienna, Archduchy of Austria
- Works: List of compositions
- Spouse: Constanze Weber
- Parents: Leopold Mozart; Anna Maria Mozart
- Family: Mozart family
- Awards: Order of the Golden Spur

Wolfgang Amadeus Mozart (Note: Sources vary regarding the English pronunciation of Mozart's name. Fradkin 1996, a guide for classical music radio, strongly recommends the use of the phoneme /ts/ for the letter z (thus /ˈwʊlfɡæŋ ˌæməˈdeɪəs ˈmoʊtsɑːrt/ WUULF-gang AM-ə-DAY-əs MOHT-sart), but otherwise considers English-like pronunciation fully acceptable. The German pronunciation is [ˈvɔlfɡaŋ amaˈdeːʊs ˈmoːtsart].) (Note: Baptised as Joannes Chrysostomus Wolfgangus Theophilus Mozart. Respectively, these Christian names refer to the following Saints: John Chrysostom, Wolfgang of Regensburg and Theophilus. Mozart used, at different times and places, different versions of his own name; for details, see Mozart's name.) (27 January 1756 – 5 December 1791) was a Classical composer and musician. He completed more than 800 works in his life—including outstanding examples of most of the genres of his time: symphonies, concertos, chamber music, opera and choral music. He is regarded as one of the greatest composers in the history of Western music.

Born in Salzburg, Mozart quickly emerged as a child prodigy under the training of his father Leopold, a skilled pedagogue. At the age of five he was already competent on keyboard and violin, had begun to compose, and had performed before European royalty. His father took him on a grand tour of Europe and then three trips to Italy. At 17 he was a musician at the Salzburg court but grew restless and travelled in search of a better position. A fruitless journey in search of employment (1777–1779) led him to Paris, Mannheim, Munich and eventually back to Salzburg. During this time he wrote his five violin concertos, the Sinfonia Concertante, various masses and the opera Idomeneo.

While he was visiting Vienna in 1781, Mozart's quarrels with his Salzburg employers came to a head and he was dismissed. He chose to remain in Vienna, where he stayed for the rest of his life, achieving fame and some financial success, but no long-term security. During Mozart's early years in Vienna he produced several notable works, such as the opera Die Entführung aus dem Serail, the Great Mass in C minor, the "Haydn" Quartets and a number of symphonies. Throughout his Vienna years Mozart composed more than a dozen piano concertos, many considered masterpieces.

In his final years, he wrote many of his best-known works, including his last three symphonies, culminating in the Jupiter, the serenade Eine kleine Nachtmusik, his Clarinet Concerto, the operas Le nozze di Figaro, Don Giovanni, Così fan tutte and Die Zauberflöte, the Piano Concerto No. 27 and his Requiem. The Requiem was largely unfinished at the time of his death at the age of 35.

== Life and career ==
=== Sources ===
Modern scholars rely on various source materials in writing Mozart's biography. First, there are about 1500 pages of family letters, often vivid and entertaining, mostly written when travel separated Mozart from his kin. (Note: For examples in this encyclopedia, see Maria Anna Thekla Mozart, Constanze Mozart, Johann Andreas Stein, and below; for important non-family letters, see Michael Puchberg. Spaethling (2000) translates a subset of the letters using a vernacular style intended to match the original German. For the 1938 translation by Emily Anderson, using formal style, see Anderson 1938.) There are also early biographies, written with input from Mozart's sister Nannerl, his wife Constanze, and others who knew him well. Old documents, such as newspaper stories and government records, have been located in libraries and archives, annotated, and published. (Note: The key work is Deutsch (1965), Mozart: A Documentary Biography, augmented by later findings: Eisen (1991a), Edge & Black (2022), and the research of Michael Lorenz, mostly on line.) Lastly, the composer's surviving manuscripts shed light on the history and dating of his compositions: there are sketches, drafts, dated autographs of completed works, (Note: Even the undated manuscripts turn out to be datable, by examining their watermarks; see Tyson (1987).) and Mozart's personal catalog.

Mozart biographers all work from these same sources, but they often disagree on crucial points. The disagreements arise in part from the need to judge how much to believe a source who had strong motivation to diverge from the truth. (Note: The principal cases are: (1) How much Mozart's letters diverge from truth in order to placate his father Leopold (see e.g. Schroeder (1999)); (2) Whether Leopold's letters to Mozart are correct in asserting that the family was short of money (compare Solomon (1995) with Halliwell (1998)); (3) Whether Constanze Mozart's tragic narrative of her husband's slow decline and death is to be taken at face value or was influenced by the need to raise funds; see Death of Mozart and below.) A source once widely used but now judged untruthful is the publisher Friedrich Rochlitz, who sought to increase posthumous sales of Mozart's works by publishing false, vivid stories about him. A trend across time, noted in Stafford (2003), is for biographers to be less credulous (e.g., in believing Rochlitz), less sentimental, (Note: For a vivid criticism of sentimentalism as found in the work of the mid-20th-century biographer Alfred Einstein see Zaslaw (1994).) and more sensitive to information about Mozart's own society and times. (Note: Representative work: Halliwell (1998) covers travel, medicine, and the standing of women; Link (1998) covers aspects of the theater in Mozart's day; Edge (2001) covers music copying and publication.)

=== Early life ===
==== Family and childhood ====
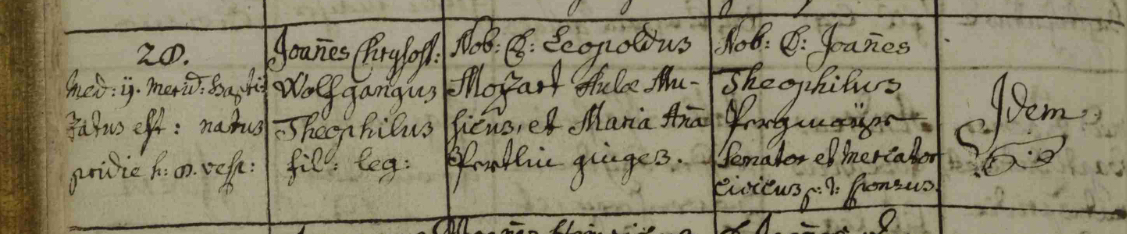
Baptismal record showing him as "Joannes Chrysostomus Wolfgangus Theophilus Mozart"

Wolfgang Amadeus Mozart was born on 27 January 1756 to Leopold Mozart and Anna Maria (née Pertl) at Getreidegasse 9 in Salzburg. Salzburg was the capital of the Archbishopric of Salzburg, an ecclesiastical principality within the Holy Roman Empire, located in what is now Austria. (Note: Source: Wilson 1999, p. 2. The many changes of European political borders since Mozart's time make it difficult to assign him an unambiguous nationality; see Mozart's nationality.) He was the youngest of seven children, five of whom died in infancy. His elder sister was Maria Anna Mozart, nicknamed "Nannerl". Mozart was baptised the day after his birth, at St. Rupert's Cathedral in Salzburg. The baptismal record gives his name in Latinised form, as Joannes Chrysostomus Wolfgangus Theophilus Mozart. He generally called himself "Wolfgang Amadè Mozart" as an adult, but his name had many variants.

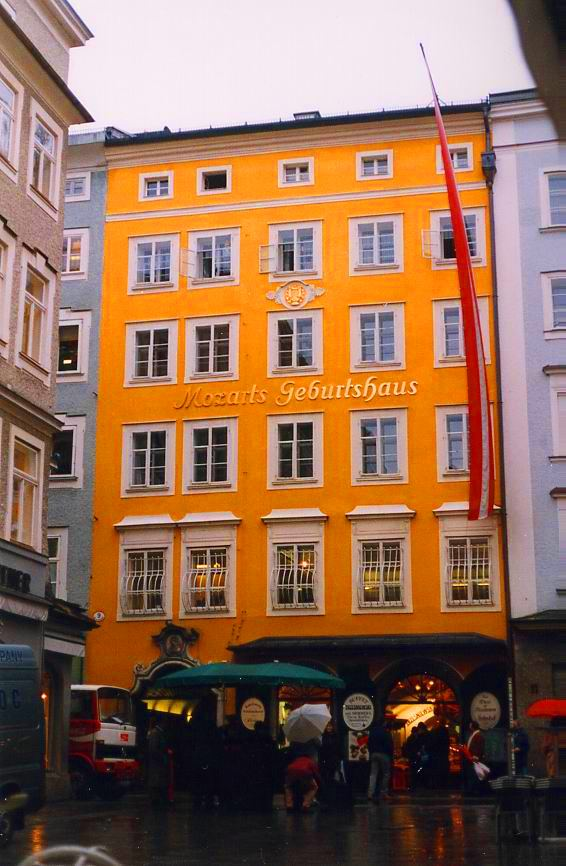
Mozart's birthplace at Getreidegasse 9, Salzburg

Leopold Mozart, a native of Augsburg, then an Imperial Free City in the Holy Roman Empire, was a minor composer and an experienced teacher. In 1743, he was appointed as the fourth violinist in the musical establishment of Count Leopold Anton von Firmian, the ruling Prince-Archbishop of Salzburg. Four years later, he married Anna Maria in Salzburg. Leopold became the orchestra's deputy Kapellmeister in 1763. During the year of his son's birth, Leopold published a successful violin textbook, Versuch einer gründlichen Violinschule.

When Nannerl was seven, she began keyboard lessons with her father, while her three-year-old brother looked on. Years later, after her brother's death, she reminisced:

He often spent much time at the clavier, picking out thirds, which he was ever striking, and his pleasure showed that it sounded good. ... In the fourth year of his age his father, for a game as it were, began to teach him a few minuets and pieces at the clavier. ... He could play it faultlessly and with the greatest delicacy, and keeping exactly in time. ... At the age of five, he was already composing little pieces, which he played to his father who wrote them down.

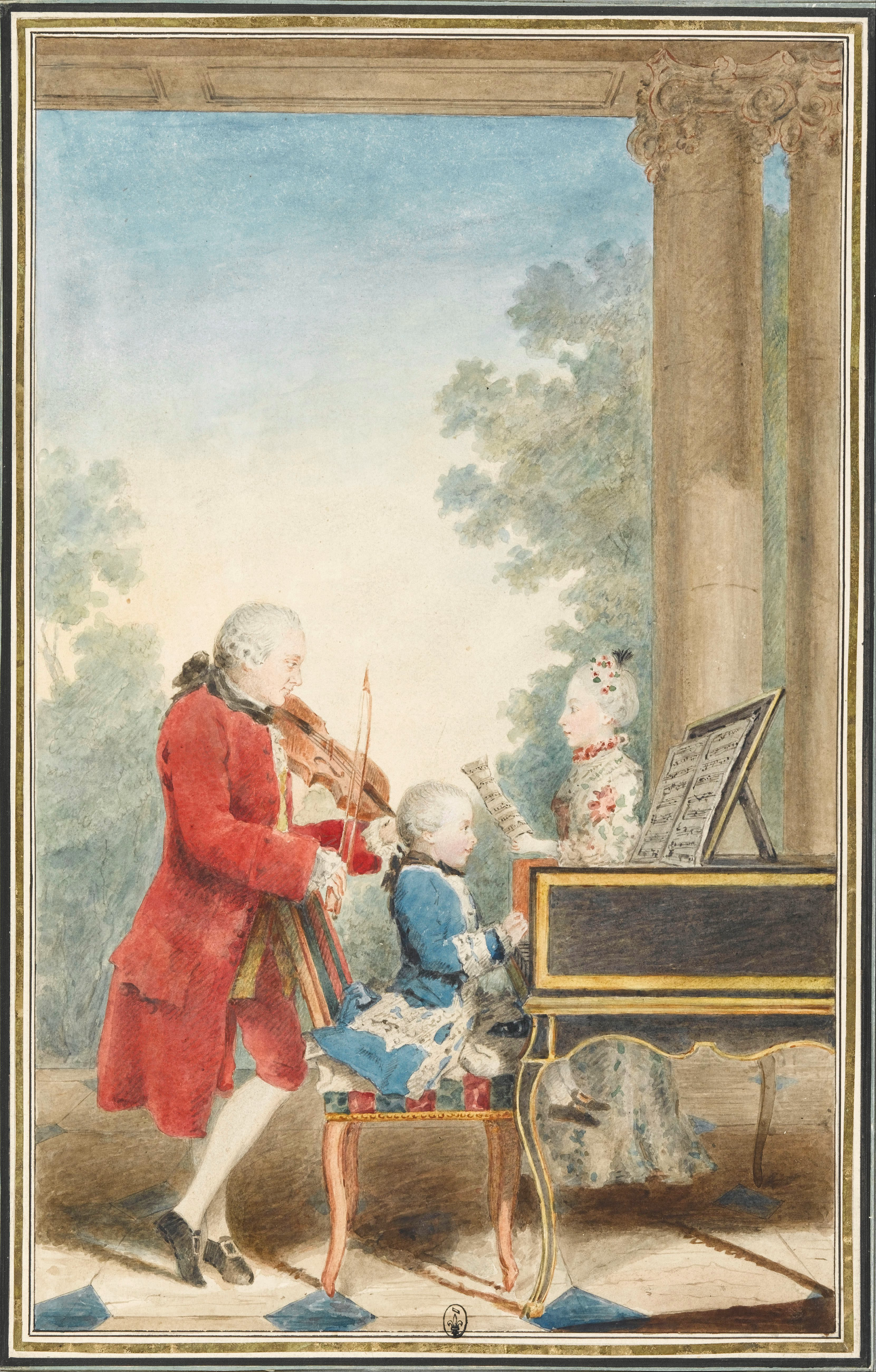
Mozart family on tour: Leopold, Wolfgang, Nannerl; watercolour by Carmontelle, c. 1763

These early pieces, K. 1–5, were recorded in the Nannerl Notenbuch.

Leopold was their only teacher. Along with music, he taught his children languages and academic subjects. While Leopold was a devoted teacher to his children, there is evidence that Mozart was keen to progress beyond what he was taught: his first ink-spattered composition and his precocious efforts with the violin were of his own initiative and came as a surprise to Leopold, who eventually gave up composing when his son's musical talents became evident. Leopold dubbed Wolfgang "the miracle whom God allowed to be born in Salzburg."

==== 1762–1773: Travel ====
While Wolfgang was young, his family made several European journeys in which he and Nannerl performed as child prodigies. These began with an exhibition in 1762 at the court of Prince-elector Maximilian III of Bavaria in Munich, and at the Imperial Courts in Vienna and Prague. A long concert tour followed, spanning three and a half years, taking the family to the courts of Munich, Mannheim, Paris, London, The Hague, Amsterdam, Utrecht, again to Paris, and back home via Zurich, Donaueschingen and Munich. During this trip, Wolfgang met many musicians and acquainted himself with the works of other composers. A particularly significant influence was Johann Christian Bach, whom he visited in London in 1764 and 1765. When he was eight years old, Mozart wrote his first symphony, most of which was probably transcribed by Leopold.

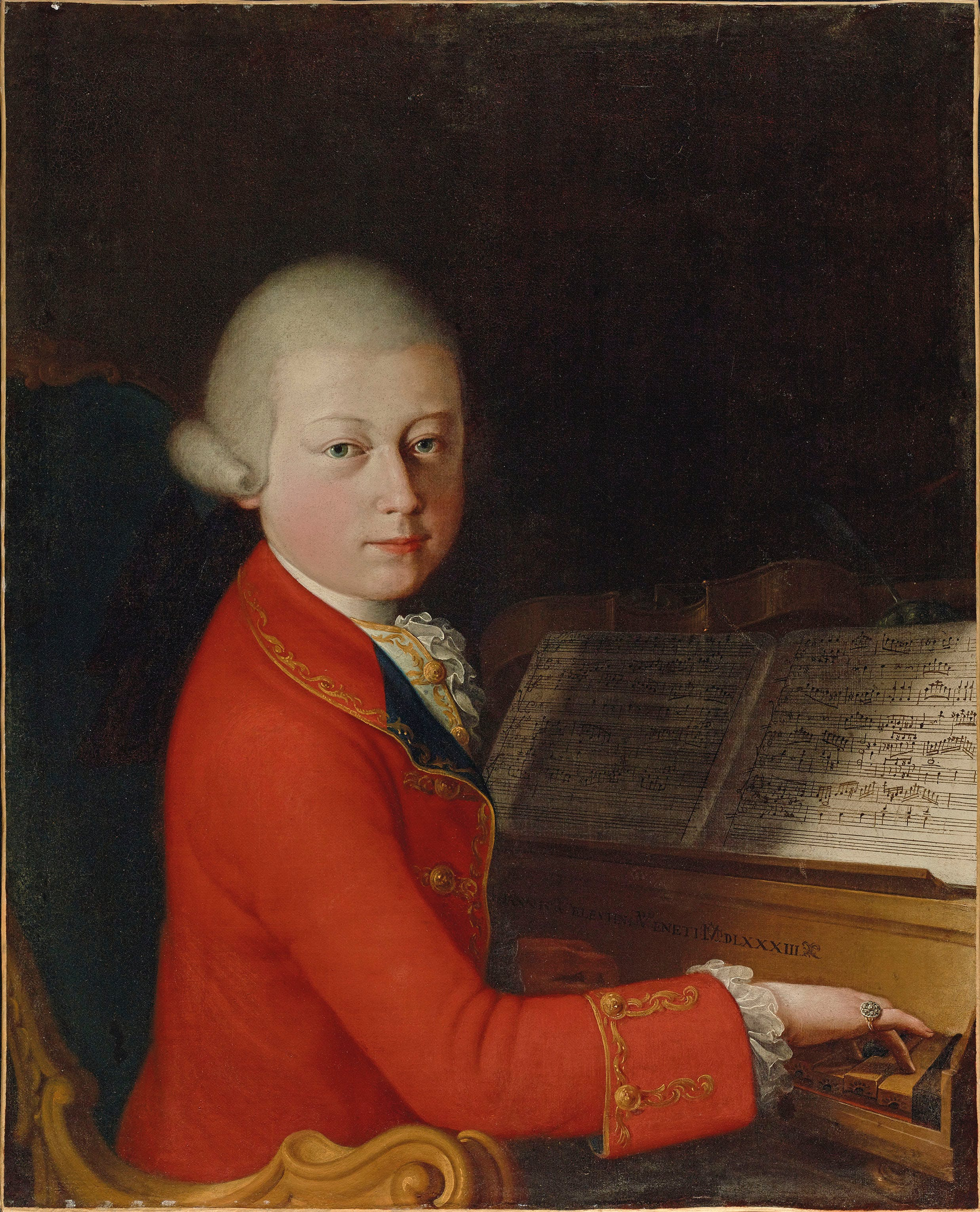
Mozart aged 14 in January 1770 (School of Verona, attributed to Giambettino Cignaroli)

Antiphon "Quaerite primum regnum Dei", K. 86/73v
Composed 9 October 1770 for admission to the Accademia Filarmonica di Bologna; Performed by Phillip W. Serna, treble, tenor & bass viols

The family trips were often challenging, and travel conditions were primitive. They had to wait for invitations and reimbursement from the nobility, and they endured long, near-fatal illnesses far from home: first Leopold (London, summer 1764), then both children (The Hague, autumn 1765). The family again went to Vienna in late 1767, where both Wolfgang and Nannerl caught smallpox during an outbreak, though they quickly recovered. They remained there until December 1768.

After one year in Salzburg, Leopold and Wolfgang set off for Italy, leaving Anna Maria and Nannerl at home. This tour lasted from December 1769 to March 1771. As with earlier journeys, Leopold wanted to display his son's abilities as a performer and a rapidly maturing composer. Wolfgang met Josef Mysliveček and Giovanni Battista Martini in Bologna and was accepted as a member of the famous Accademia Filarmonica. According to a letter Leopold wrote home to Salzburg, while in Rome Wolfgang heard Gregorio Allegri's Miserere twice in performance in the Sistine Chapel. He subsequently wrote it out from memory, thus producing the "first unauthorised copy of this closely guarded property of the Vatican". The details of this account are, however, disputed. (Note: For further details of the story, see Miserere (Allegri) § History.)

In Milan, Mozart wrote the opera Mitridate, re di Ponto (1770), which was performed with success. This led to further opera commissions. He returned with his father twice to Milan (August–December 1771; October 1772 – March 1773) for the composition and premieres of Ascanio in Alba (1771) and Lucio Silla (1772). Leopold hoped these visits would result in a professional appointment for his son, and indeed ruling Archduke Ferdinand contemplated hiring Mozart, but owing to his mother Empress Maria Theresa's reluctance to employ "useless people", the matter was dropped (Note: Eisen & Keefe (2006), p. 268: "You ask me to take the young Salzburger into your service. I do not know why not believing that you have need for a composer or of useless people. ... What I say is intended only to prevent you from burdening yourself with useless people and giving titles to people of that sort. In addition, if they are at your service, it degrades that service when these people go about the world like beggars.") and Leopold's hopes were never realised.

Most of the music Mozart wrote at this early stage of his career is little known today, but there is one exception: toward the end of the last Italian journey, Mozart wrote the solo motet Exsultate, jubilate, K.165 for the castrato Venanzio Rauzzini; this work is a favourite for performance by sopranos today.

=== 1773–1777: Employment at the Salzburg court ===
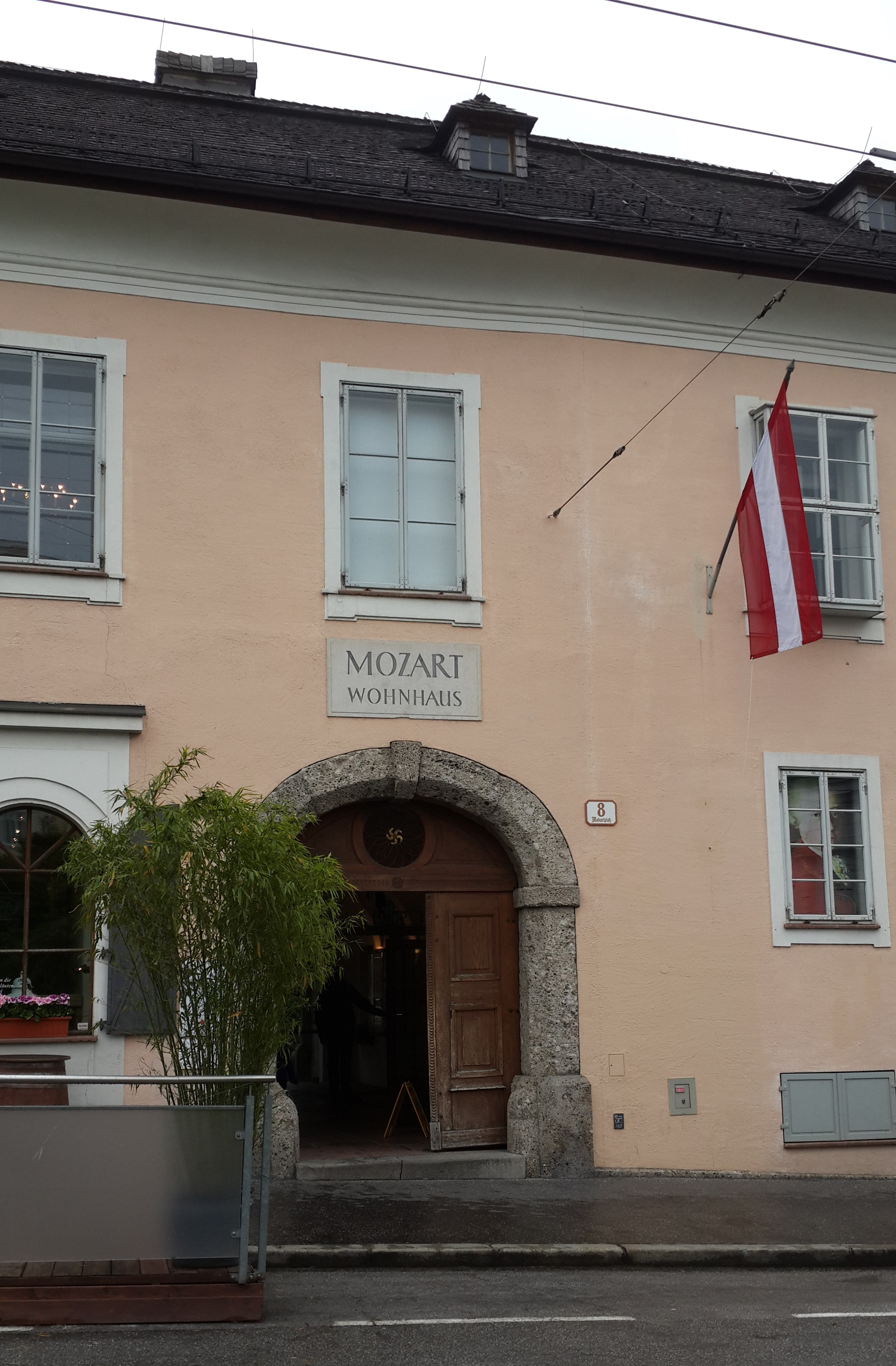
Tanzmeisterhaus, Salzburg, Mozart family residence from 1773; reconstructed in 1996

After finally returning with his father from Italy on 13 March 1773, Mozart was employed as a court musician by the ruler of Salzburg, Prince-Archbishop Hieronymus Colloredo. The composer had many friends and admirers in Salzburg and had the opportunity to work in many genres, including symphonies, concertos, sonatas, string quartets, masses, serenades, and a few minor operas.

An important part of Mozart's output at this time was violin concertos: he wrote one in 1773 and four more in 1775. These are the only violin concertos he ever wrote, and through the series they increase in their musical sophistication. The last three—K. 216, K. 218, K. 219—are staples of the modern repertoire.

In 1776 he turned his efforts to piano concertos, culminating in the E♭ concerto K. 271 of early 1777, considered by critics to be a breakthrough work.

Despite these artistic successes, Mozart grew increasingly discontented with Salzburg and redoubled his efforts to find a position elsewhere. One reason was his low salary, 150 florins a year; Mozart longed to compose operas, and Salzburg provided only rare occasions for these. The situation worsened in 1775 when the court theatre was closed, especially since the other theatre in Salzburg was primarily reserved for visiting troupes.

Two long expeditions in search of work interrupted this long Salzburg stay. Mozart and his father visited Vienna from 14 July to 26 September 1773, and Munich from 6 December 1774 to March 1775. Neither visit was successful, though the Munich journey resulted in a popular success with the premiere of Mozart's opera La finta giardiniera.

=== 1777–1778: Journey to Paris ===
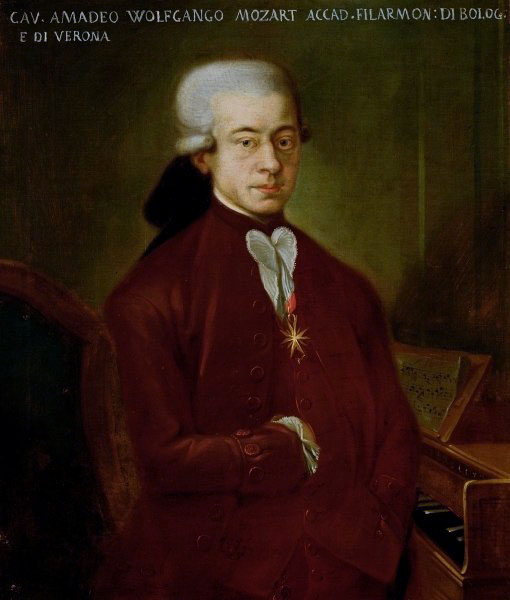
Mozart wearing the badge of the Order of the Golden Spur which he received in 1770 from Pope Clement XIV in Rome

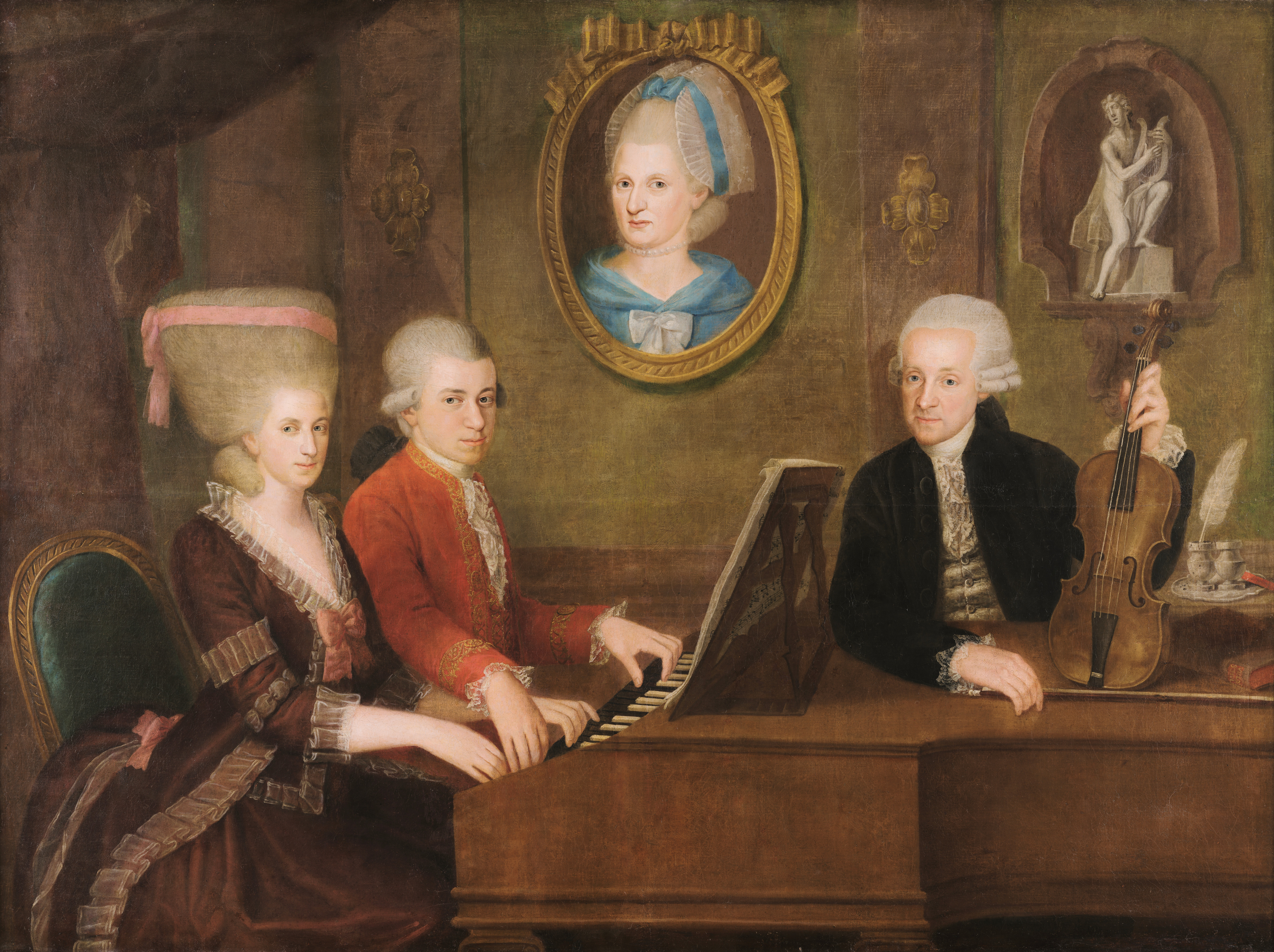
Portrait of the Mozart Family, c. 1780 (attrib. Johann Nepomuk della Croce); the portrait on the wall is of Mozart's mother.

In August 1777 Mozart resigned his position at Salzburg (Note: Archbishop Colloredo responded to the request by dismissing both Mozart and his father, though the dismissal of the latter was not actually carried out.) and on 23 September ventured out once more in search of employment, this time accompanied by his mother, with visits to Munich, Augsburg, Mannheim, and Paris.

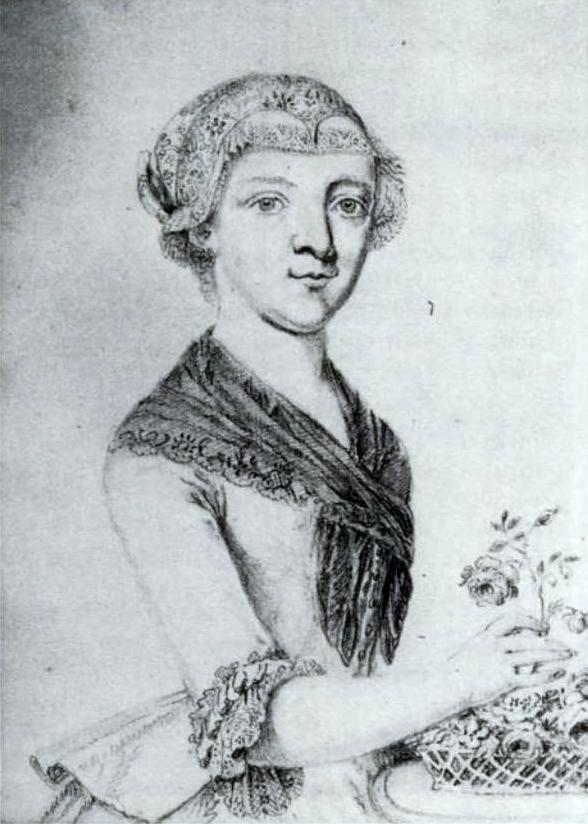
Maria Anna Thekla Mozart. Self-portrait in pencil from 1777 or 1778. Now in the Mozart-Museum in Salzburg.

The first stop, in Munich, proved to offer Mozart no sort of permanent position, and the mother and son moved on to Augsburg on 11 October. This was the city where Leopold had grown up, and still living there was Mozart's uncle Franz Aloys Mozart and his daughter, Mozart's first cousin Maria Anna Thekla Mozart. She and Mozart engaged in what Abert calls a "charming and innocent flirtation" and Solomon treats as a more serious and more sexual encounter. After Mozart departed Augsburg, the two exchanged letters, of which Mozart's have survived. These are mostly devoid of news and consistently silly. They contain some veiled sexual references, but mostly are scatological, with frequent mentions of what is translated in English as "muck". The letters have astonished, and sometimes dismayed, modern readers. While some scholars suggest some sort of mental disorder on the basis of Mozart's letters, others have noted the greater prevalence of scatological humour in Mozart's place and time, including among his own family members; see Mozart and scatology.

Mozart and his mother reached Mannheim on 30 October. There, Mozart became acquainted with members of the famous orchestra in Mannheim, the best in Europe at the time. He also fell in love with Aloysia Weber, one of four daughters of a musical family. There were prospects of employment in Mannheim, but they came to nothing, and Mozart left for Paris on 14 March 1778 to continue his search. One of his letters from Paris hints at a possible post as an organist at Versailles, but Mozart was not interested in such an appointment. He fell into debt and took to pawning valuables. The nadir of the visit occurred when Mozart's mother was taken ill and died on 3 July 1778. There had been delays in calling a doctor—probably, according to Halliwell, because of a lack of funds. Mozart stayed with Melchior Grimm at Marquise d'Épinay's residence, 5 rue de la Chaussée-d'Antin.

While Mozart was in Paris, his father was pursuing opportunities of employment for him in Salzburg. With the support of the local nobility, Mozart was offered a post as court organist and concertmaster. The annual salary was 450 florins, but he was reluctant to accept. By that time, relations between Grimm and Mozart had cooled, and Mozart moved out. After leaving Paris in September 1778 for Strasbourg, he lingered in Mannheim and Munich, still hoping to obtain an appointment outside Salzburg. In Munich, he again encountered Aloysia, now a very successful singer, but she was no longer interested in him. Mozart finally returned to Salzburg on 15 January 1779 and took up his new appointment, but his discontent with Salzburg remained undiminished.

Among the better-known works which Mozart wrote on the Paris journey are the Piano Sonata No. 8, K. 310/300d, the Symphony No. 31 (Paris), which were performed in Paris on 12 and 18 June 1778; and the Concerto for Flute and Harp in C major, K. 299/297c.

In February 2026, a 44-page manuscript by Mozart was discovered at the Bibliothèque nationale de France, the institution with the second-largest collection of Mozart's manuscripts. The manuscript contains composition exercises and seven pieces for flute and harp, probably in relation to Mozart's lessons to Marie-Louise-Philippine (1759–1796), daughter of Adrien-Louis de Bonnières. The pieces were premiered on 21 June and excerpts were broadcast the next day.

=== Vienna ===
==== 1781: Departure ====
In January 1781 Mozart's opera Idomeneo premiered with "considerable success" in Munich. The following March, Mozart was summoned to Vienna, where his employer, Archbishop Colloredo, was attending the celebrations for the accession of Joseph II to the Austrian throne. For Colloredo, this was simply a matter of wanting his musical servant to be at hand (Mozart indeed was required to dine in Colloredo's establishment with the valets and cooks). (Note: Mozart complains of this in a letter to his father, dated 24 March 1781.) He planned a bigger career as he continued in the archbishop's service; for example, he wrote to his father:

My main goal right now is to meet the emperor in some agreeable fashion, I am absolutely determined he should get to know me. I would be so happy if I could whip through my opera for him and then play a fugue or two, for that's what he likes.

Mozart did indeed soon meet the Emperor, who was to support his career substantially with commissions and a part-time position.

In the same letter to his father just quoted, Mozart outlined his plans to participate as a soloist in the concerts of the Tonkünstler-Societät, a prominent benefit concert series; this plan as well came to pass after the local nobility prevailed on Colloredo to drop his opposition.

Colloredo's wish to prevent Mozart from performing outside his establishment was in other cases carried through, raising the composer's anger; one example was a chance to perform before the Emperor at Countess Thun's for a fee equal to half of his yearly Salzburg salary.

The quarrel with the archbishop came to a head in May: Mozart attempted to resign and was refused. The following month, permission was granted, but in a grossly insulting way: the composer was dismissed literally "with a kick in the arse", administered by the archbishop's steward, Count Arco. Mozart decided to settle in Vienna as a freelance performer and composer.

The quarrel with Colloredo was more difficult for Mozart because his father sided against him. Hoping fervently that he would obediently follow Colloredo back to Salzburg, Mozart's father exchanged intense letters with his son, urging him to reconcile with their employer. Mozart passionately defended his intention to pursue an independent career in Vienna. The debate ended when Mozart was dismissed by the archbishop, freeing himself both of his employer and of his father's demands to return. Solomon characterizes Mozart's resignation as a "revolutionary step" that significantly altered the course of his life.

==== Early years ====
Mozart's new career in Vienna began well. He often performed as a pianist, notably in a competition before the Emperor with Muzio Clementi on 24 December 1781, and he soon "had established himself as the finest keyboard player in Vienna". He also prospered as a composer, and in 1782 completed the opera Die Entführung aus dem Serail which premiered on 16 July 1782 and achieved considerable success. The work was soon being performed "throughout German-speaking Europe", and established Mozart's reputation as a composer.

==== Marriage and children ====
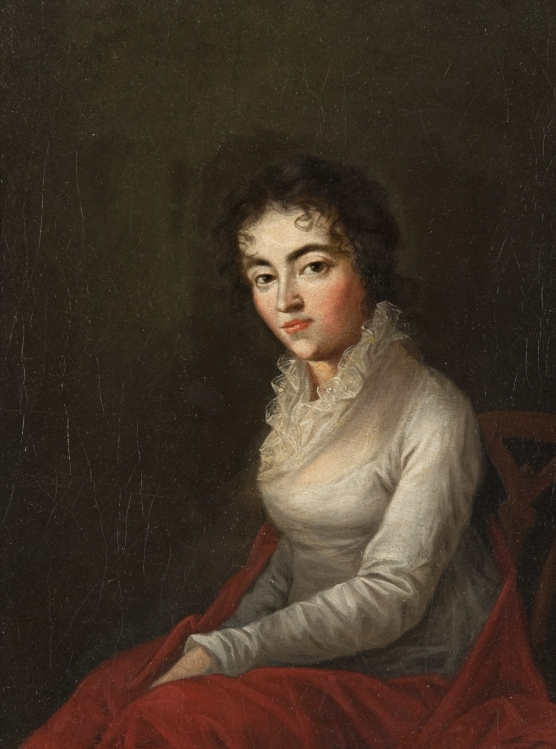
1782 portrait of Constanze Mozart by her brother-in-law Joseph Lange

Near the height of his quarrels with Colloredo, Mozart moved in with the Weber family, who had moved to Vienna from Mannheim. The family's father, Fridolin, had died, and the Webers were now taking in lodgers to make ends meet. Mozart had previously wooed the second daughter of the family, Aloysia Weber, who was now a successful singer in Vienna, married to the actor and artist Joseph Lange. Mozart's interest shifted to the third daughter, Constanze. As his interest became clear, Constanze's mother Cäcilia insisted that Mozart move out in the interest of propriety.

Mozart's courtship of Constanze did not go entirely smoothly; surviving correspondence indicates that the couple briefly broke up in April 1782, over an episode involving jealousy: Constanze had permitted another young man to measure her calves in a parlour game. Mozart also faced a very difficult task getting permission for the marriage from his father.

The marriage took place in an atmosphere of crisis. A letter from Mozart to Leopold from 31 July 1782 has been interpreted as suggesting that Constanze had moved in with him, which would have placed her in disgrace by the mores of the time. Mozart wrote, "All the good and well-intentioned advice you have sent fails to address the case of a man who has already gone so far with a maiden. Further postponement is out of the question." Heartz relates, "Constanze's sister Sophie had tearfully declared that her mother would send the police after Constanze if she did not return home [presumably from Mozart's apartment]." On 4 August, Mozart wrote to Baroness von Waldstätten, asking, "Can the police here enter anyone's house in this way? Perhaps it is only a ruse of Madame Weber to get her daughter back. If not, I know no better remedy than to marry Constanze tomorrow morning or if possible today." The couple were finally married on 4 August 1782 in St. Stephen's Cathedral, the day before his father's consenting letter arrived in the mail.

The couple had six children, of whom only two survived infancy:

- Raimund Leopold (17 June – 19 August 1783)
- Karl Thomas Mozart (21 September 1784 – 31 October 1858)
- Johann Thomas Leopold (18 October – 15 November 1786)
- Theresia Constanzia Adelheid Friedericke Maria Anna (27 December 1787 – 29 June 1788)
- Anna Maria (died soon after birth, 16 November 1789)
- Franz Xaver Wolfgang Mozart (26 July 1791 – 29 July 1844)

Eisen judges that the marriage was basically happy, based in part on Mozart's letters to Constanze, which are generally very affectionate, often funny, and occasionally erotic. There is one letter that suggests the family's precarious finances may have been a source of matrimonial tension. In a letter she wrote in old age Constanze described her marriage to Mozart as having been "completely happy".

=== 1782–1785 ===
In 1782 and 1783 Mozart became intimately acquainted with the work of George Frideric Handel and Johann Sebastian Bach through Gottfried van Swieten, who owned many manuscripts of the Baroque masters. Mozart's study of these scores inspired compositions in the Baroque style and influenced his musical language, for example in fugal passages in his late works.

In 1783 Mozart and his wife visited his family in Salzburg, for the first and only time after their marriage. It is possible that the visit was tense, since Leopold had been sharply opposed to the marriage, and Mozart's sister Nannerl had evidently snubbed Constanze in correspondence. Nannerl's diary records a busy agenda of socializing and tourism, but no information remains about how the family members got along. The visit prompted the composition of one of Mozart's great liturgical pieces, the Mass in C minor K. 527. Though not completed, it was premiered in Salzburg, with Constanze singing a solo part.

Mozart met Joseph Haydn in Vienna around 1784, and the two composers became friends. When Haydn visited Vienna, they sometimes played chamber music together with other friends. Mozart's "Haydn" Quartets (K. 387, K. 421, K. 428, K. 458, K. 464 and K. 465) date from the period 1782 to 1785, and are judged to be a response to Haydn's Opus 33 set from 1781, and are today considered key works of the string quartet literature. Mozart wrote to Haydn, "A father, having decided to send his children out into the wide world, felt that he should entrust them to the protection and guidance of a famous Man who by good fortune also was his Friend.—Here they are, distinguished Man and dearest Friend, my six children."

Both Haydn and Mozart's father Leopold (visiting from Salzburg) were present in 1785 at a gathering where three of the quartets were played, and Haydn remarked to Leopold, "I tell you before God, and as an honest man, your son is the greatest composer known to me by person and repute, he has taste and what is more the greatest skill in composition."

From 1782 to 1785 Mozart mounted concerts with himself as piano soloist, presenting three or four new concertos in each season. Since space in the theatres was scarce, he booked unconventional venues: a large room in the Trattnerhof apartment building, and the ballroom of the Mehlgrube restaurant. The concerts were very popular, and his concertos premiered there are still firm fixtures in the repertoire. Of these works, Solomon writes that Mozart created "a harmonious connection between an eager composer-performer and a delighted audience, which was given the opportunity of witnessing the transformation and perfection of a major musical genre".

With substantial returns from his concerts and elsewhere, Mozart and his wife adopted a more luxurious lifestyle. They moved to an expensive apartment, with a yearly rent of 460 florins. Mozart bought a fine fortepiano from Anton Walter for about 900 florins, and a billiard table for about 300. The Mozarts sent their son Karl Thomas to an expensive boarding school and kept servants. During this period Mozart saved little of his income.

On 14 December 1784 Mozart became a Freemason, admitted to the lodge Zur Wohltätigkeit ("Beneficence"). Freemasonry played an essential role in the remainder of Mozart's life: he attended meetings, a number of his friends were Masons, and on various occasions he composed Masonic music, e.g. the Maurerische Trauermusik.

==== 1786–1787: Return to opera ====
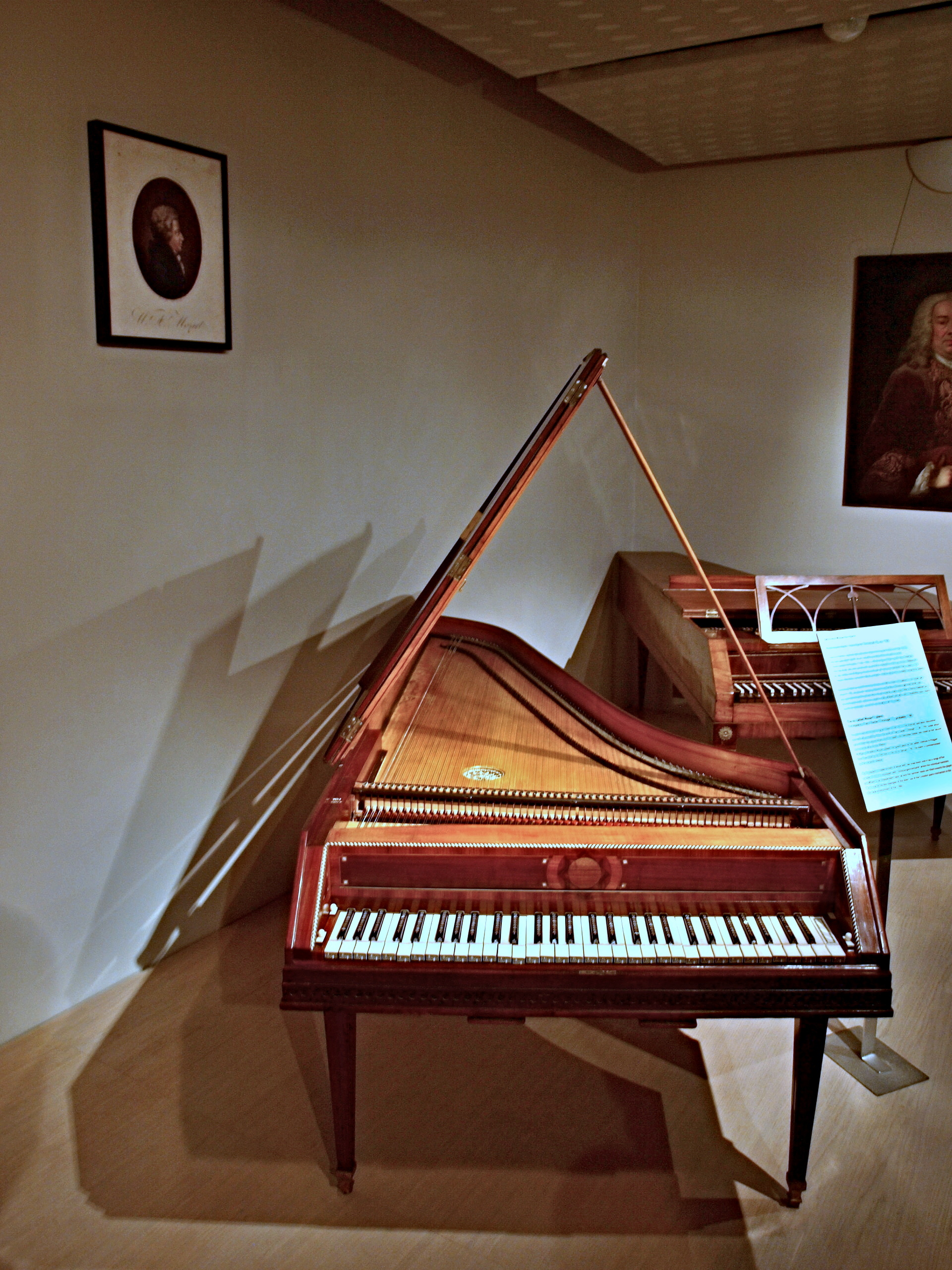
Fortepiano played by Mozart in 1787, Czech Museum of Music, Prague

Despite the great success of Die Entführung aus dem Serail, Mozart did little operatic writing for the next four years, producing only two unfinished works and the one-act Der Schauspieldirektor. He focused instead on his career as a piano soloist and writer of concertos. Around the end of 1785, Mozart moved away from keyboard writing and began his famous operatic collaboration with the librettist Lorenzo Da Ponte. The year 1786 saw the successful premiere of Le nozze di Figaro in Vienna. The work was then produced in Prague, with an invitation to Mozart to attend and give concerts. It was on this occasion that Mozart premiered his 38th symphony, now known as the Prague Symphony. Both the opera and the symphony were received enthusiastically, and the visit was an unusually happy episode in Mozart's life; see Mozart and Prague.

The success of Le Nozze di Figaro led to a commission for an opera to be performed by the resident opera company of Prague; the work thus spawned was Don Giovanni, Mozart's second collaboration with Da Ponte. It premiered in October 1787 to acclaim in Prague, and was produced again, though without the same degree of success, in Vienna during 1788. Le Nozze di Figaro and Don Giovanni are among Mozart's most famous works and are mainstays of operatic repertoire today, though at their premieres their musical complexity caused difficulty both for listeners and for performers.

In December 1787, Mozart finally obtained a steady post under aristocratic patronage. Emperor Joseph II appointed him as his "chamber composer", a post that had fallen vacant the previous month on the death of Christoph Willibald Gluck. It was a part-time appointment, paying just 800 florins per year, and required Mozart only to compose dances for the annual balls in the Redoutensaal (see Mozart and dance). This modest income became important to Mozart when hard times arrived. Court records show that Joseph aimed to keep the esteemed composer from leaving Vienna in pursuit of better prospects. It is a biographical tradition to view this position as a mere sinecure; but a more recent view, put forth by Wolff (2012), is that Mozart's position was a more substantial one and that some of Mozart's chamber music from this time was written as part of his imperial duties.

In 1787 the young Ludwig van Beethoven spent several weeks in Vienna, hoping to study with Mozart. Beethoven almost certainly heard Mozart perform, but (despite a widely told anecdote to this effect) it is not certain that the two actually met in person; see Beethoven and Mozart.

The same year was marked by the death of Leopold on 28 May 1787 – in a way, six months too early, since Leopold would never learn that his lifetime goal for his son, a paid court position, was finally achieved. Despite longstanding tensions with his father, Mozart had remained in contact by correspondence to the end of Leopold's life, and Leopold's death was likely a blow to him. Eisen suggests that the death "triggered a fallow period for the composer", noting that Mozart was similarly unproductive following the death of his mother in July 1778. The task of dealing with Leopold's estate was one of the last matters of mutual concern for Wolfgang and Nannerl; not long after, they became estranged and ceased to correspond. 1787 saw the publication of Eine kleine Nachtmusik.

=== Later years ===
==== 1788–1790 ====
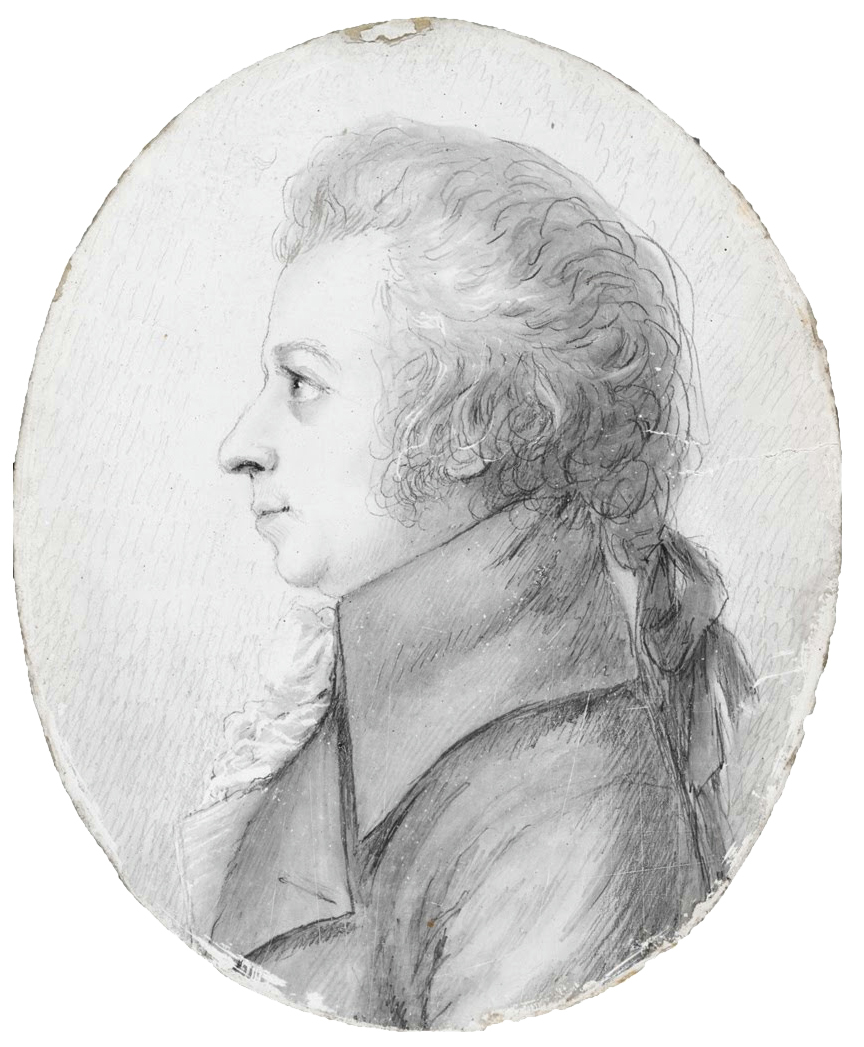
Drawing of Mozart in silverpoint, made by Dora Stock during Mozart's visit to Dresden, April 1789

Toward the end of the decade, Mozart's circumstances worsened. Around 1786, he ceased to appear frequently in public concerts, and his income shrank. This was a difficult time for musicians in Vienna because of the Austro-Turkish War: a corresponding economic decline meant most patrons could not afford ticket prices, and ever fewer could pay for commissions. According to Solomon, in 1788, Mozart saw a 66% decline in his income compared to his best years in 1781.

By mid-1788, Mozart and his family had moved from central Vienna to the suburb of Alsergrund. Although it has been suggested that Mozart aimed to reduce his rental expenses by moving to a suburb (he said this in a letter to his friend and fellow mason Michael von Puchberg), later research has shown that Mozart had not actually reduced his expenses but merely increased the housing space at his disposal. Mozart began borrowing money, most often from Puchberg; "a pitiful sequence of letters pleading for loans" survives. Solomon and others have suggested that Mozart was suffering from depression, and his musical output may have slowed. Yet the production of works considered as high points of Mozart's oeuvre continued, including the last three symphonies, Nos. 39, 40 and 41 (Jupiter), all from the summer of 1788, the Clarinet Quintet of 1789, and the last of the three Da Ponte operas, Così fan tutte, premiered in 1790.

Around this time, Mozart made two long journeys hoping to improve his fortunes, visiting Leipzig, Dresden, and Berlin in the spring of 1789 (see Mozart's Berlin journey), and Frankfurt, Mannheim, and other German cities in 1790. Wolff (2012) emphasizes how these journeys improved Mozart's contacts and broadened his reputation, but they also involved setbacks and frustrations, and probably did not achieve the goals, particularly financial, that Mozart had set for them.

==== 1791 ====
Mozart's last year was, until his final illness struck, a time of high productivity—and by some accounts, one of personal recovery. (Note: More recently, Wolff 2012 has forcefully advocated a view of Mozart's career at the end of his life as being on the rise, interrupted by his sudden death.) He composed a great deal, including some of his most admired works: the opera Die Zauberflöte; his last piano concerto (No. 27 K. 595); the Clarinet Concerto K. 622; the last in his series of string quintets (K. 614 in E♭); the motet Ave verum corpus K. 618; and the unfinished Requiem K. 626.

Mozart's financial situation, a source of anxiety in 1790, finally began to improve. Although the evidence is inconclusive, it appears that wealthy patrons in Hungary and Amsterdam pledged annuities to Mozart in return for the occasional composition. He is also thought to have benefited from the sale of dance music written in his role as Imperial chamber composer. Mozart stopped asking for loans from Puchberg and probably made efforts to pay off some of his debts, though he was still largely impoverished by the time of his death.

He experienced great satisfaction in the public success of some of his works, notably Die Zauberflöte (frequently performed to packed houses in Mozart's lifetime) and the Kleine Freimaurer-Kantate K. 623, premiered on 17 November 1791. (Note: And not as previously stated on 15 November; see Abert 2007, p. 1307, fn 9)

==== Final illness and death ====
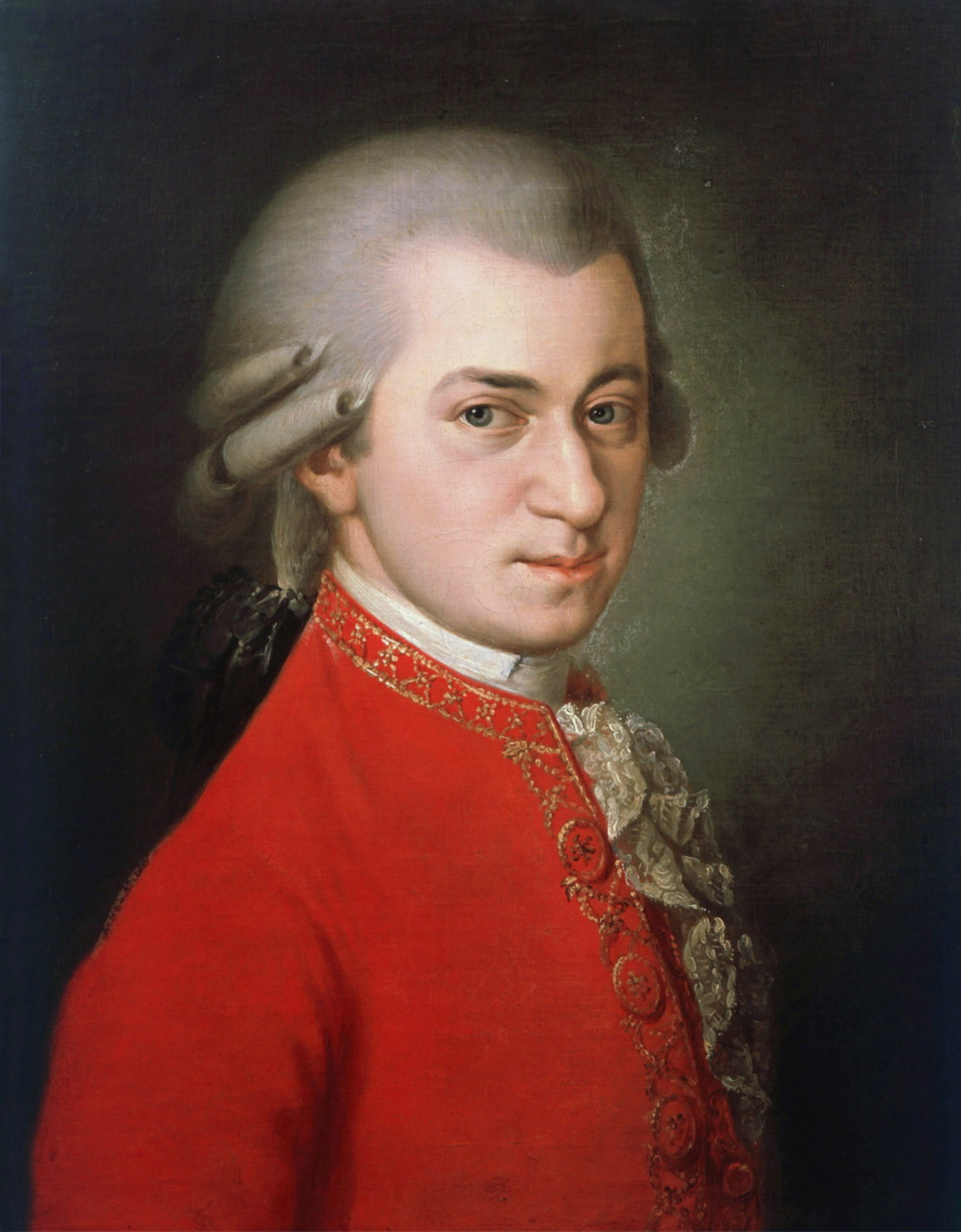
Posthumous painting by Barbara Krafft in 1819

Mozart fell seriously ill on 20 November 1791, and took to (what turned out to be) his deathbed; he suffered from swelling, pain, and vomiting. There is a serious controversy about whether his illness had started earlier, with a long and demoralizing period of decline, or was sudden. Mozart was nursed in his final days by his wife and her younger sister Sophie and was attended by the family doctor, Thomas Franz Closset. By Sophie's testimony Mozart spent some of his final hours in conversation with his student and friend Süssmayr, discussing the problem of getting his Requiem completed. (Note: Sophie wrote in 1825 to the Mozart biographer Georg Nikolaus von Nissen (Constanze's second husband), "Süssmayr was at Mozart's bedside. The well-known Requiem lay on his quilt and Mozart was explaining to him how, in his opinion, he ought to finish it, when he was gone.")

Mozart died in his home on 5 December 1791 (aged 35) at 12:55 am. The New Grove describes his funeral:

Mozart was interred in a common grave, in accordance with contemporary Viennese custom, at the St. Marx Cemetery outside the city on 7 December. If, as later reports say, no mourners attended, that too is consistent with Viennese burial customs at the time; later Otto Jahn (1856) wrote that Salieri, Süssmayr, van Swieten and two other musicians were present. The tale of a storm and snow is false; the day was calm and mild.

The expression "common grave" refers to neither a communal grave nor a pauper's grave, but an individual grave for a member of the common people (i.e., not the aristocracy). Common graves were subject to excavation after ten years; aristocrats' graves were not.

The cause of Mozart's death is not known with certainty. The official record of hitziges Frieselfieber ("severe miliary fever", referring to a rash that looks like millet seeds) is more a symptomatic description than a diagnosis. Researchers have suggested more than a hundred causes of death, including acute rheumatic fever, streptococcal infection, trichinosis, influenza, mercury poisoning and a rare kidney ailment. The contemporary Viennese public health official Eduard Guldener von Lobes, who consulted with Mozart's doctors at the time, insisted that Mozart most likely died in an epidemic, asserting that many people in Vienna had died at the same time with the same symptoms. Modern work by Zegers et al., tracing death records of the time, found a modest spike in the death rate for late 1791, supporting Guldener's claim.

Mozart's modest funeral did not reflect his standing with the public as a composer, but memorial services and concerts in Vienna and Prague were well attended. In the period immediately after his death, his reputation rose substantially. Solomon describes an "unprecedented wave of enthusiasm" for his work; biographies were written first by Friedrich Schlichtegroll, Franz Xaver Niemetschek and Georg Nikolaus von Nissen, and publishers vied to produce complete editions of his works.

== Appearance and character ==
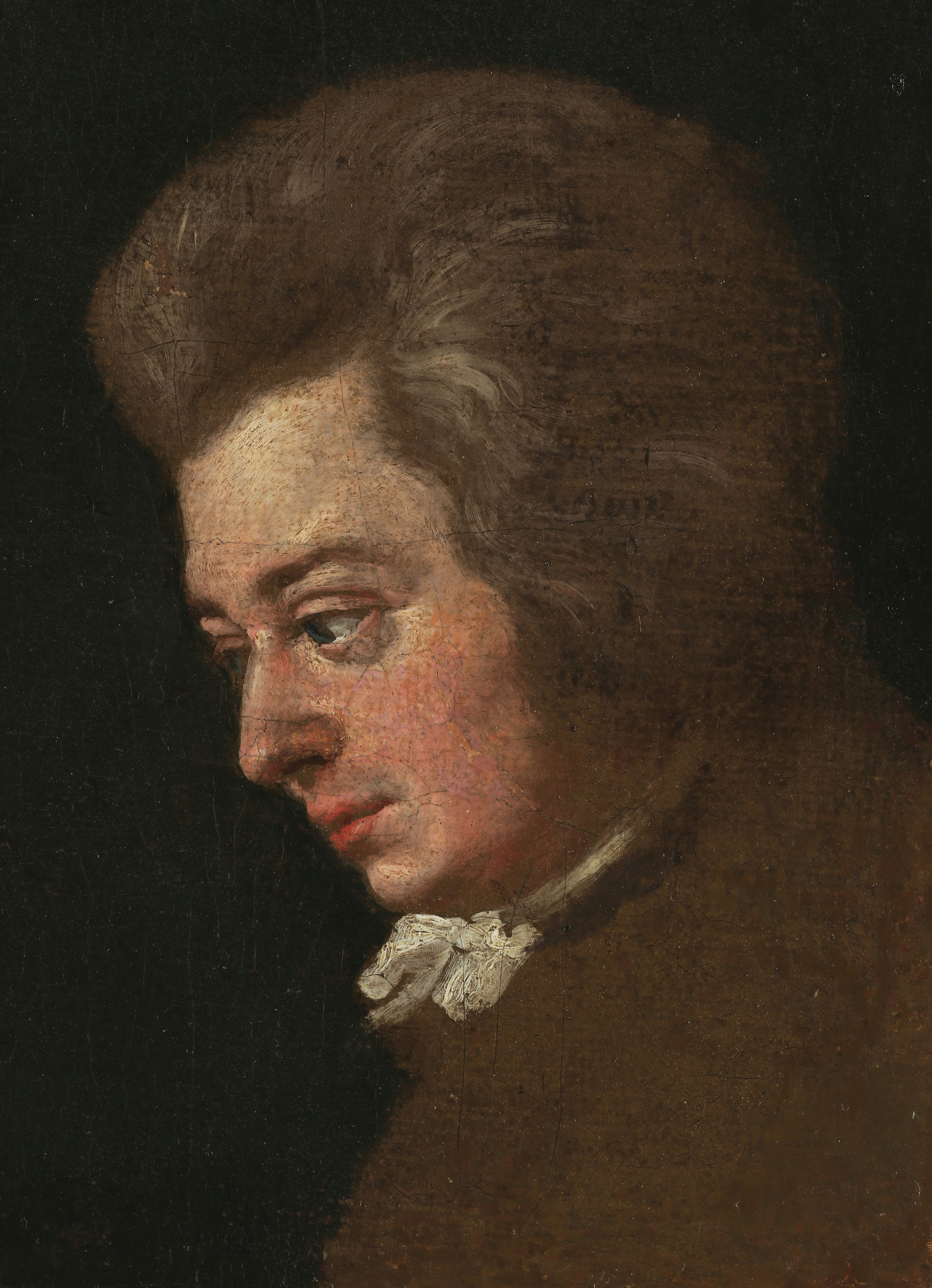
Detail of Mozart's portrait by his brother-in-law Joseph Lange

Mozart's physical appearance was described by the tenor Michael Kelly in his Reminiscences: "a remarkably small man, very thin and pale, with a profusion of fine, fair hair of which he was rather vain". His early biographer Niemetschek wrote, "there was nothing special about [his] physique. ... He was small and his countenance, except for his large intense eyes, gave no signs of his genius." His facial complexion was pitted, a reminder of his childhood case of smallpox. Of his voice, his wife later wrote that it "was a tenor, rather soft in speaking and delicate in singing, but when anything excited him, or it became necessary to exert it, it was both powerful and energetic."

He loved elegant clothing. Kelly remembered him at a rehearsal: "[He] was on the stage with his crimson pelisse and gold-laced cocked hat, giving the time of the music to the orchestra." The surviving portraits suggest that Mozart often wore a powdered wig tied in a queue in line with the style of the 18th century for formal occasions.

Mozart usually worked long and hard, finishing compositions at a tremendous pace as deadlines approached. He often wrote sketches, from small snippets to extensive drafts, for his compositions. Though many of these were destroyed by his widow, about 320 sketches and drafts survive, covering about 10 percent of the composer's work.

Mozart lived at the centre of the Viennese musical world and knew a significant number and variety of people: fellow musicians, theatrical performers, fellow Salzburgers and aristocrats, including some acquaintance with Emperor Joseph II. Solomon considers his three closest friends to have been Gottfried von Jacquin, Count August Hatzfeld and Sigmund Barisani; others included his elder colleague Joseph Haydn, the singers Franz Xaver Gerl and Benedikt Schack and the horn player Joseph Leutgeb. Leutgeb and Mozart carried on a kind of friendly mockery, often with Leutgeb as the butt of Mozart's practical jokes.

He enjoyed billiards, dancing, and kept pets, including a canary, a starling, a dog and a horse for recreational riding. He had a startling fondness for scatological humour, which is preserved in his surviving letters, notably those written to his cousin Maria Anna Thekla Mozart around 1777–1778, and in his correspondence with his sister and parents. Mozart also wrote scatological music, a series of canons that he sang with his friends. (Note: A list of the canons may be found at Mozart and scatology#In music.) He had an ear for languages, and having travelled all over Europe as a boy, was fluent in French, Italian and Latin in addition to his native Salzburg dialect of German. He possibly also understood and spoke some English, having jokingly written "You are an ass" after his 19-year-old student Thomas Attwood made a thoughtless mistake on his exercise papers.

Mozart was raised a Catholic and remained a practicing Catholic throughout his life. He embraced Freemasonry in 1784 and remained a lodge member for the rest of his life; see Mozart and Freemasonry.

== Works, style and innovations ==
=== Style ===
Symphonie Nr. 40 G minor, K. 550. Movement: 1. Molto allegro

Overture to Don Giovanni
Both performed by the Fulda Symphonic Orchestra, conductor: Simon Schindler

Mozart's music, with Haydn's, stands as an archetype of the Classical style. At the time he began composing, European music was dominated by the style galant, a reaction against the highly evolved intricacy of the Baroque. The emerging classical style constituted a major reconception of how music ought to be composed, largely replacing polyphonic with homophonic textures, and it took some time for the new style to achieve the musical weight that had been attained by the Baroque masters; indeed, the period following the deaths of Bach and Handel produced rather little music that still commands the attention of modern listeners. Mozart, despite his genius, was a man of his time, and most of the music he wrote early in his career is influenced strongly by its models and is little performed today (the few exceptions are noted above). His Piano Concerto No. 9, K. 271, from 1777, is sometimes described as a breakthrough work; Charles Rosen called it "perhaps the first unequivocal masterpiece in [the] classical style". Harold C. Schonberg writes that "The piano concerto is a musical form developed by Mozart into symphonic breadth, and there is not one of his concertos after K. 271 in E flat without it special kind of eloquence, finish and virtuosity." Mozart's musical language continued to increase in its scope and complexity, notably in the use of chromatic harmony and reintroduction of counterpoint, partly inspired by the composer's relationship with Gottfried van Swieten noted above. The Jupiter Symphony is full of references to earlier works, including Mozart's own.

Mozart wrote in every major genre, including symphony, opera, the solo concerto, chamber music including string quartet and string quintet and the piano sonata. These forms were not new, but Mozart advanced their technical sophistication and emotional reach. From his earliest years to his last, he composed a varied number of vocal works – concert arias, songs and canons. He almost single-handedly developed and popularised the Classical piano concerto. He wrote a great deal of religious music, including large-scale masses, as well as dances, divertimenti, serenades and other forms of light entertainment.

The central traits of the Classical style are all present in Mozart's music. Clarity, balance and transparency are the hallmarks of his work, but simplistic notions of its delicacy mask the exceptional power of his finest masterpieces, such as the Piano Concerto No. 24 in C minor, K. 491; the Symphony No. 40 in G minor, K. 550; and the opera Don Giovanni. Rosen makes the point forcefully:

It is only through recognising the violence and sensuality at the centre of Mozart's work that we can make a start towards a comprehension of his structures and an insight into his magnificence. In a paradoxical way, Schumann's superficial characterisation of the G minor Symphony can help us to see Mozart's daemon more steadily. In all of Mozart's supreme expressions of suffering and terror, there is something shockingly voluptuous.

Rosen also notes that Mozart's thematic material could be made up of apparently incongruous elements, and presents an analysis of the first movement of Mozart's Prague symphony as an example. This view has been supported by recent statistical studies of the predictability of music by Haydn, Mozart, Beethoven and Schubert, in which Mozart's music had significantly lower predictability indices than the other three composers.

During his last decade, Mozart frequently exploited chromatic harmony. A notable instance is his String Quartet in C major, K. 465 (1785), whose introduction abounds in chromatic suspensions, giving rise to its nickname, the "Dissonance" quartet.

Mozart had a gift for absorbing and adapting the valuable features of others' music. His travels helped in the forging of a unique compositional language. In London as a child, he met Johann Christian Bach and heard his music. In Paris, Mannheim and Vienna he met with other compositional influences, as well as the avant-garde capabilities of the Mannheim orchestra. In Italy, he encountered the Italian overture and opera buffa, both of which deeply affected the evolution of his practice. In London and Italy, the galant style was in the ascendent: simple, light music with a mania for cadencing; an emphasis on tonic, dominant and subdominant to the exclusion of other harmonies; symmetrical phrases; and clearly articulated partitions in the overall form of movements. Some of Mozart's early symphonies are Italian overtures, with three movements running into each other; many are homotonal (all three movements having the same key signature, with the slow middle movement being in the relative minor). Others mimic the works of J. C. Bach and others show the simple rounded binary forms turned out by Viennese composers.

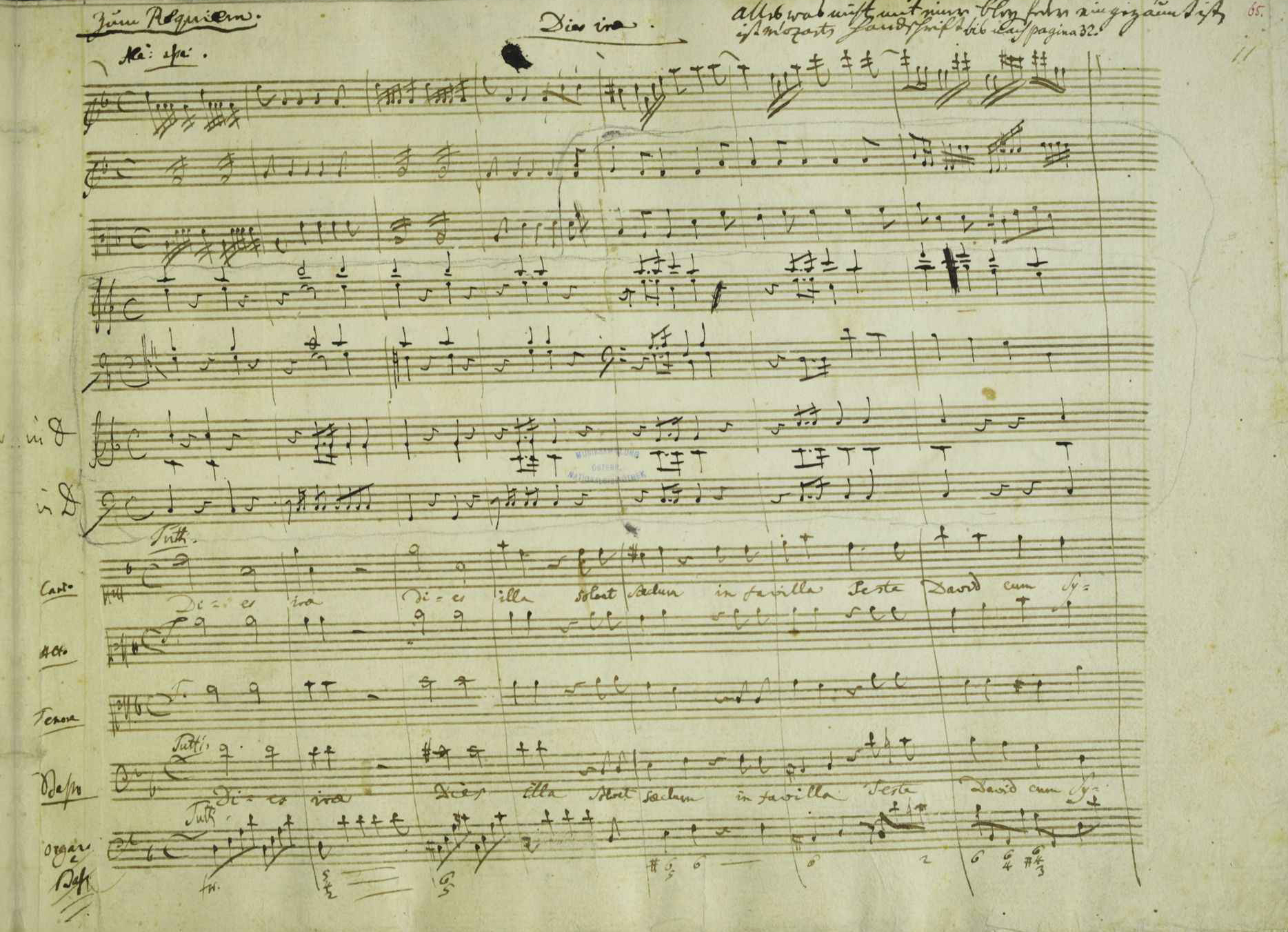
Facsimile sheet of music from the Dies Irae movement of the Requiem Mass in D minor (K. 626) in Mozart's handwriting (Mozarthaus, Vienna)

As Mozart matured, he progressively incorporated more features adapted from the Baroque, particularly Bach and Handel . For example, the Symphony No. 29 in A major K. 201 has a contrapuntal main theme in its first movement, and experimentation with irregular phrase lengths. Some of his quartets from 1773 have fugal finales, probably influenced by Haydn, who had included three such finales in his recently published Opus 20 set. The influence of the Sturm und Drang ("Storm and Stress") period in music, with its brief foreshadowing of the Romantic era, is evident in the music of both composers at that time. Mozart's Symphony No. 25 in G minor K. 183 is another excellent example. Schonberg writes that "Mozartean polyphony is not Bachian polyphony, but Mozart was inspired by Bach to introduce all kinds of contrapuntal devices, all used with perfect security and confidence. The culmination is the last movement of the Jupiter Symphony, where contrasting themes are lined up, harnessed, and sent galloping down the final stretch of one of the most glorious, tingling and overwhelming passages in music."

Mozart would sometimes switch his focus between operas and instrumental music. He produced operas in each of the prevailing styles: opera buffa, (Le nozze di Figaro, Don Giovanni and Così fan tutte); opera seria, such as (Idomeneo); and Singspiel, of which Die Zauberflöte is the most famous example by any composer.

Mozart employed subtle changes in instrumentation, orchestral texture and tone colour for emotional depth and to mark dramatic shifts. He wrote of an aria in Entführung:

there comes (just when the aria seems to be at an end) the allegro assai, which in a totally different measure and in a different key; this is bound to be very effective. For just as a man in such a towering rage oversteps the bounds of order, moderation and propriety and completely forgets himself, so must the music too forget itself. But as passions, whether violent or not, must never be expressed in such a way as to excite disgust, and as music, even in the most terrible situations, must never offend the ear, but must please the hearer, or in other words must never cease to be music, I have gone from F (the key in which the aria is written) not into a remote key, but into a related one, not however, into the nearest relative D minor, but into the more remote A minor.

Of the aria "O wie ängstlich", he wrote "Would you like to know how I have expressed it—and even indicated his throbbing heart? By two violins playing octaves. ... You feel the trembling—the faltering—you see how his throbbing breast begins to swell; this I have expressed by a crescendo. You hear the whispering and the sighing—which I have indicated by the first violins with mutes and a flute playing in unison."

His advances in opera and instrumental composing interacted: his increasingly sophisticated use of the orchestra in the symphonies and concertos influenced his operatic orchestration, and his developing subtlety in using the orchestra to psychological effect in his operas was in turn reflected in his later non-operatic compositions. Alex Ross writes: "The golden mean runs through the Andante of the Sinfonia Concertante for Violin and Viola, from 1779-80. A beguiling four-bar melody appears twice, in E-flat major in the middle and in C minor at the end. The first time, the major mode is briefly shadowed by a turn into the relative minor. The second time, minor is flecked by major, creating the effect of a light in the night. The two passages are more or less the same, but the space between them could contain a novel." Rosen writes “Both the last piano concerto and the Clarinet Concerto are private statements: the form is never exploited for exterior effect, the tone is always one of intimacy. The slow movements aspire and attain and to a condition of absolute simplicity. … The melodies accept the reduction to an almost perfect symmetry and triumph over all its dangers. It is fitting that Mozart, who perfected as he created the form of the classical concerto, should have made his last use of it so completely personal."

== Editions, catalogues and recordings ==
Shortly after Mozart's death in 1791, it became a goal of publishers to produce a complete printed edition of everything that he had written. Both Breitkopf & Härtel and Johann Anton André negotiated with Mozart's widow Constanze to this purpose, and both of them issued multiple works, though falling far short of completeness. The publication of this music helped rescue Constanze and her two children from poverty, enabling them to live in comfort.

During the first decades of the 19th century, the desire for a truly complete edition became apparent, and with extensive scholarly contributions (including from Johannes Brahms) this led to what is today called the Alte Mozart-Ausgabe (Old Mozart Edition), issued from 1877 until 1883. With time, the shortcomings of this edition became evident, and over a period of five decades (1956–2007) a new team of Mozart scholars collaborated to create the Neue Mozart-Ausgabe, which sets the current standard. Thanks to grant support, the Neue Mozart-Ausgabe is available today on line.

Along with the creation of complete editions, musical scholarship has aspired to create musical catalogues, which provide descriptions, incipits and the estimated date of completion for each work. A catalogue also provides information about works attributed to the composer that are actually not authentic, such as Mozart's putative 37th Symphony. The earliest catalog of Mozart's works was created by the composer himself, and covers the years 1784 to 1791. After Mozart's death, scholars such as Johann Anton André attempted to create a complete catalogue, but this was only accomplished in 1862 when Ludwig Ritter von Köchel completed the first edition of what is now called the Köchel catalogue. His "Köchel numbers", marked with K or KV, (Note: The "V" is Verzeichnis, German for "catalogue".) are a standard way to identify a work of Mozart unambiguously. Since Köchel's time, the catalog has gone through several editions. 2024 marked the completion of the current, ninth edition, edited by Neal Zaslaw. In this edition, many works have been redated, thanks to progress in the use of handwriting analysis (notably work of Wolfgang Plath), and the study of watermarks (Tyson 1987). These practices have provided concrete evidence for dating in cases where earlier scholars could only speculate.

The goal of a complete Mozart edition is shared by recording companies, several of whom who have issued massive recorded compilations (170–250 compact disks), aspiring to cover all of Mozart's work.

== Instruments ==
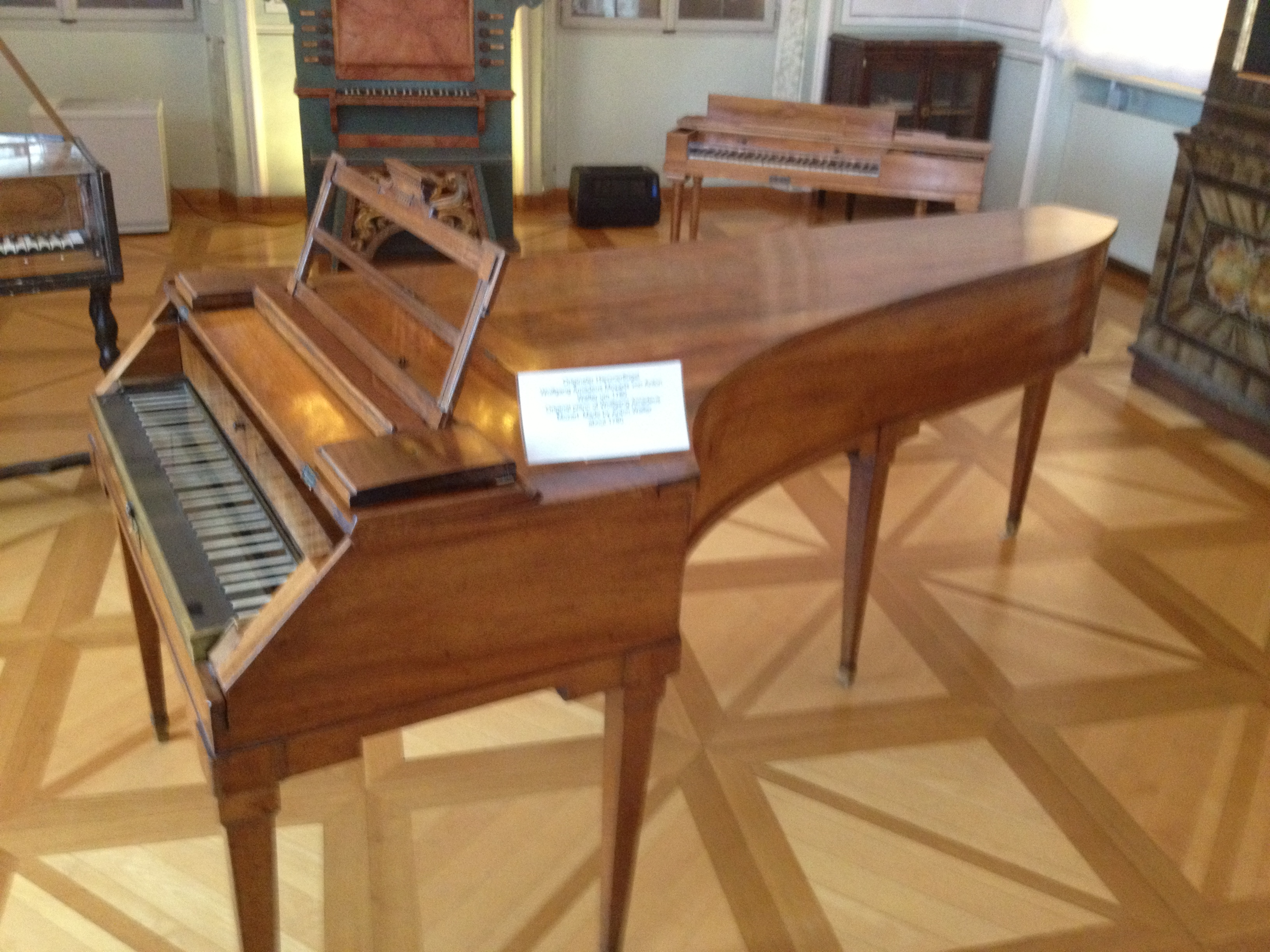
Mozart's piano, made by Anton Walter and kept today in the Tanzmeisterhaus in Salzburg

The child Mozart was trained on the harpsichord (he also became skilled at violin, singing and dancing), and his earliest compositions were written for this instrument. A major change in European music, which roughly coincided with Mozart's lifetime, was the replacement of the harpsichord by the piano – not the modern grand as we know it today, but a much lighter version, today often referred to as the fortepiano.

Mozart's keyboard works up to a certain point (not easy to determine) were written with the harpsichord in mind. An early opportunity for Mozart to encounter pianos may have been his Munich journey of 1774–1775, when he may have encountered pianos made by the Regensburg builder Franz Jakob Späth. In 1777, when Mozart was visiting Augsburg on his long job-hunting tour, he was deeply impressed by Johann Andreas Stein's pianos and shared his admiration in detailed letter to his father. His mother wrote home a bit later that in Augsburg there were pianos everywhere and that her son's playing had come to sound quite different from the way he had played in Salzburg. Indeed, Maria Anna's letter goes on to say that Mozart's piano playing was a local sensation – Mozart, with Clementi and others, was becoming part of the first generation of celebrated piano virtuosos.

To this end, in 1783 when he was living in Vienna, Mozart purchased a fortepiano by Anton Walter, a leading builder, which he played frequently in concerts at various venues in the city. This important piano was preserved after his death and may be viewed today in the Tanzmeisterhaus (the former Mozart family residence, now a museum) in Salzburg. Starting in about 1967, modern craftsmen began to construct fortepianos modelled on the old instruments, and these have become widely used in the performance of Mozart's piano music.

== Legacy ==
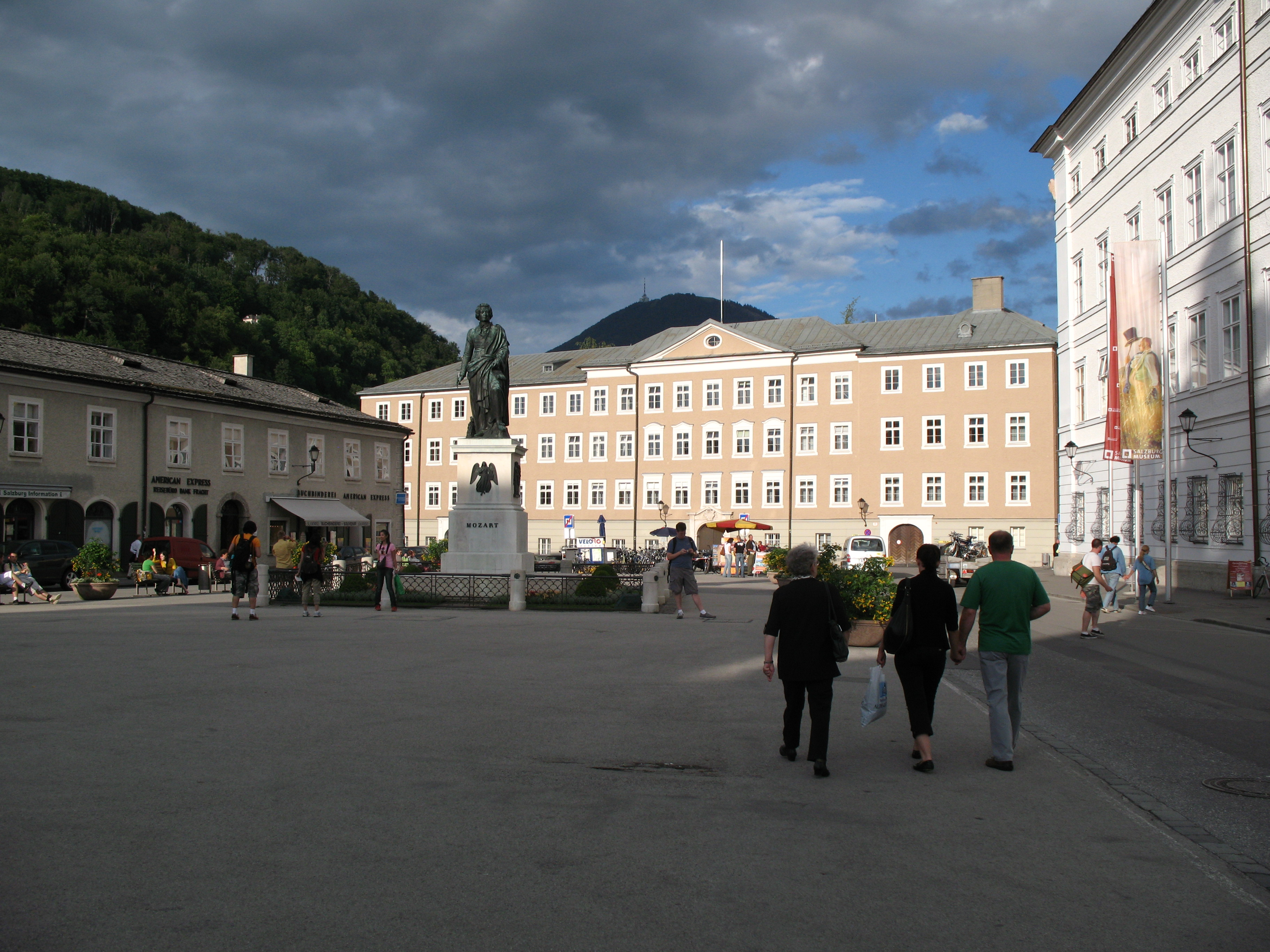
Mozart's statue in the Mozartplatz in Salzburg

Mozart's most famous pupil was Johann Nepomuk Hummel, a transitional figure between the Classical and Romantic eras whom the Mozarts took into their Vienna home for two years as a child. More important is the influence Mozart had on composers of later generations. Ever since the surge in his reputation after his death, studying his scores has been a standard part of a classical musician's training. Beethoven, Mozart's junior by fifteen years, was deeply influenced by his work. Many composers have paid homage to him, including Chopin (Variations on "Là ci darem la mano") and Tchaikovsky (Mozartiana).

Schonberg writes "Mozart was the first modern psychologist of opera... The Marriage of Figaro opens the door to a new world of opera. It is a scintillating work with real people in it, and the music exposes them for what they are—lovable, vain, capricious, selfish, ambitious, forgiving, philandering. Human beings, in short, are brought alive by the alchemy of a surpassingly inventive and sympathetic musical mind." Virgil Thomson wrote that "Don Giovanni is one of the funniest shows in the world and one of the most terrifying. It is all about love, and it kids love as a fare-ye-well. It's the world's greatest opera and the world's greatest parody of opera. It is a moral entertainment so movingly human that the morality gets lost before the play is scarcely started."

Ross writes "As ever, the slow movement of the Piano Concerto No. 23 sends us into a wistful trance; the finale of the Jupiter Symphony wakes us up into a uniquely Mozartean kind of intelligent happiness; and the apocalyptic climax of Don Giovanni stirs our primal fear of being weighed in the balance and found wanting. The loss of innocence was Mozart's, too. Like the rest of us, he had to live outside the complex paradise that he created in sound."

Mozart's legacy is widely apparent in modern life, particularly in concert programming, broadcasts, recordings, and items of popular culture. The city of Salzburg, abandoned by Mozart in frustration in 1781, is a popular tourist destination: both of Mozart's homes have been converted into museums, there is a renowned music festival (see Salzburg Festival), and the city hosts a leading scholarly institute, the International Mozarteum Foundation, for the study of Mozart's life and works. On 26 January 2006, Mozart was celebrated in a Google Doodle. The Queen of the Night Aria from The Magic Flute, performed by Edda Moser and conducted by Wolfgang Sawallisch, was included on the Voyager Golden Record, a sample of the sights and sounds of Earth sent into space with the Voyager spacecraft.
