= Franz Xaver Niemetschek =

Czech philosopher

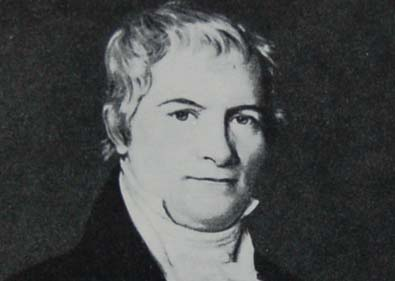
Portrait of Niemetschek

Franz Xaver Niemetschek (Czech: František Xaver Němeček; 24 July 1766 – 19 March 1849) was a Czech philosopher, teacher and music critic. He wrote the first full-length biography of Wolfgang Amadeus Mozart. It was published in 1798 and for a long time a key text in Mozart scholarship and historiography.

== Life ==
Born in Sadská, Bohemia, Niemetschek came from a large, musical family. He received his schooling in Prague at the Gymnasium and read philosophy at the university. He taught poetry and Latin at the Gymnasiums in Plzeň and started a music publishing business. In 1800, he was awarded a doctorate and in 1802, he became professor at Prague University, lecturing on logic, ethics and pedagogy. The composer Jan Václav Voříšek was one of his pupils. He was made a freeman of Plzeň and Prague for his many valuable contributions to the arts, e.g. as director of the institute for the deaf and dumb. He wrote books on music history. He lived near the residence of Josepha Duschek in the Liechtenstein Palace in the Malá Strana quarter of Prague and was a frequent visitor at the musical gatherings in Bertramka. In 1820, he retired to Vienna after disagreements with the university authorities.

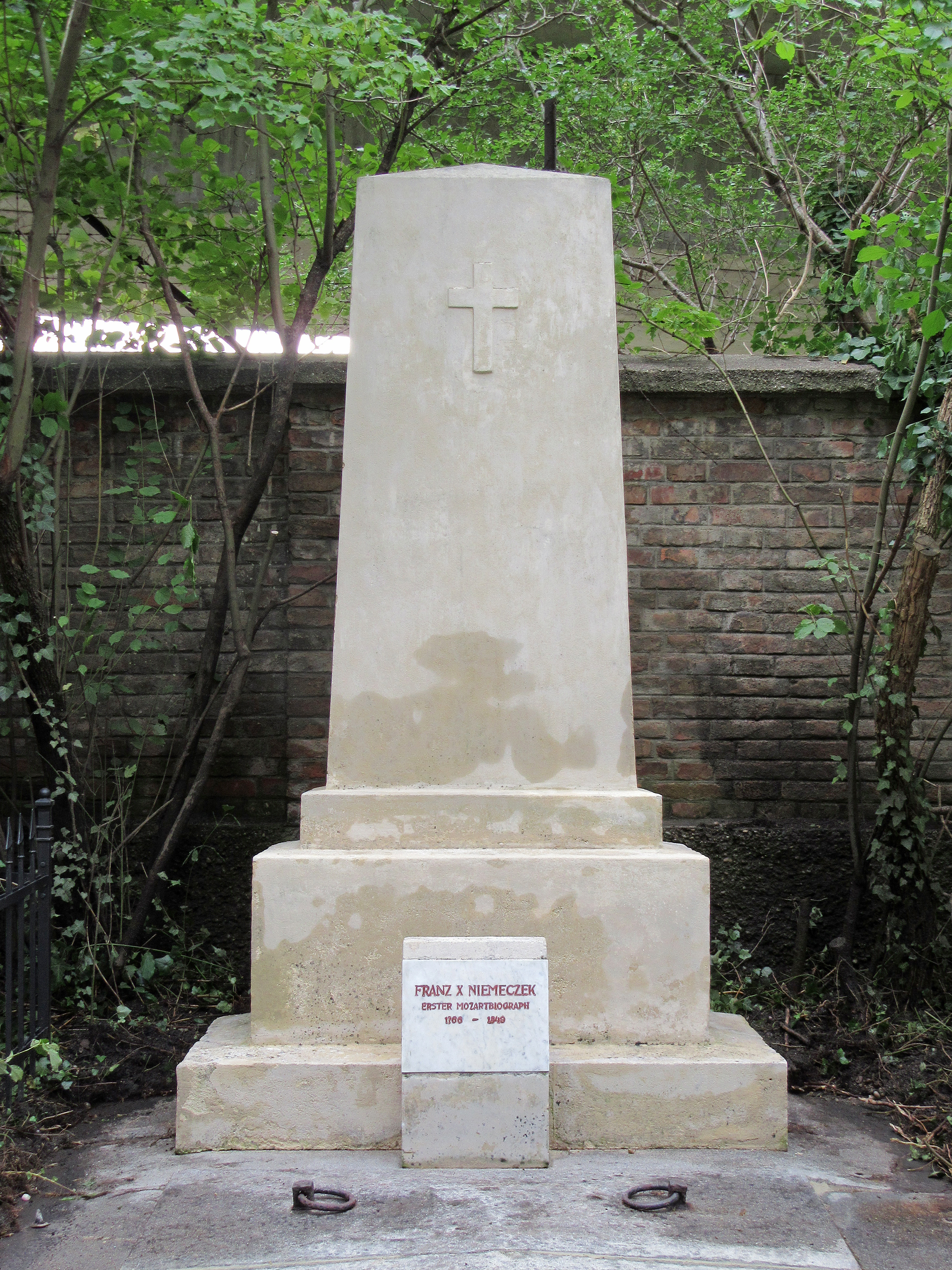
Niemetschek's grave, Vienna

Niemetschek was one of the first music critics in Prague. He saw the Singspiel as the principal factor in the decline of musical standards in the city.

Niemetschek died in Vienna at the age of 82 and is buried in St. Marx Cemetery. Unfortunately, his estate, which contained many valuable documents, is now lost.

== Mozart biography ==
Mozart's widow Constanze made many documents available to him for his research. His book Leben des k.k. Kapellmeisters Wolfgang Gottlieb Mozart was published in 1798. In 1808, it was published in an altered form with the title Lebensbeschreibung des k.k. Kapellmeisters Wolfgang Amadeus Mozart. Niemetschek claimed to have had a long association with Mozart, but the lack of direct quotations or citations of personal conversations has led some scholars to doubt his claims. However, he welcomed Mozart's two surviving sons, Karl and Wolfgang Jr., into his home in the Lesser Quarter and became a foster father figure to them.

As the biography makes clear, Niemetschek was very proud of his Czech nationality, and he strongly emphasized the warm reception that Mozart received during his visits to Prague.

Based on research (published in 1993) by Austrian scholar Walther Brauneis, severe doubt has been cast on the veracity of Niemetschek's claim that he actually made Mozart's personal acquaintance.
