= Appearance and character of Wolfgang Amadeus Mozart =

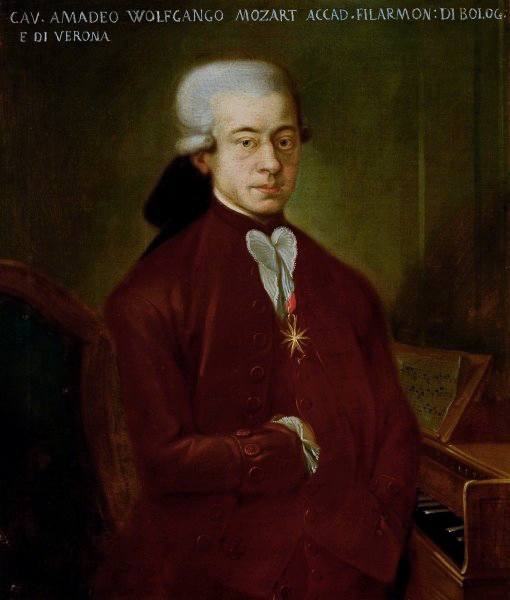
The so-called Bologna Mozart was copied in 1777 in Salzburg by a now unknown painter from a lost original for Padre Martini in Bologna, who had ordered it for his gallery of composers.

The appearance and character of Wolfgang Amadeus Mozart are known mainly from artworks, descriptions and testimonies of his time, and from his extensive correspondence. The fact that it has not been possible to exhume Mozart's remains – due to the exact location of the community grave in which he was buried being unknown – nor are masks or mortuary casts preserved, (Note: Mozart's death mask has not survived: Constanze acknowledged that she had broken it by accident. See Hutchings (1976, p. 8).) lends a degree of uncertainty to the composer's physical appearance. Although an alleged skull of Mozart exists, its authenticity has not been verified to date. This skull has been subjected to DNA tests, comparing it with the remains of his alleged niece and maternal grandmother, but the results matched neither the skull nor each other. Several locks of his hair have also been preserved. However, there are reliable sources concerning his appearance, clothing and personality, which allow us to get a more or less accurate idea of what Mozart was like physically and psychologically.

Regarding his clothing and personal effects, recent studies based on documents such as the Order of Suspension (Note: In German Sperrs-Relation, list of belongings carried out after the death of a person. See Deutsch (1961, p. 495), and Landon (1988, p. 28).) drawn up after his death or the record of receipts for the purchase of costumes, have done much to shed light on Mozart's tastes in clothing.

As for his personality, knowledge of it is mainly due to the descriptions of his contemporaries that have been preserved, as well as to the analysis of the composer's extensive personal correspondence.

== Physical appearance ==
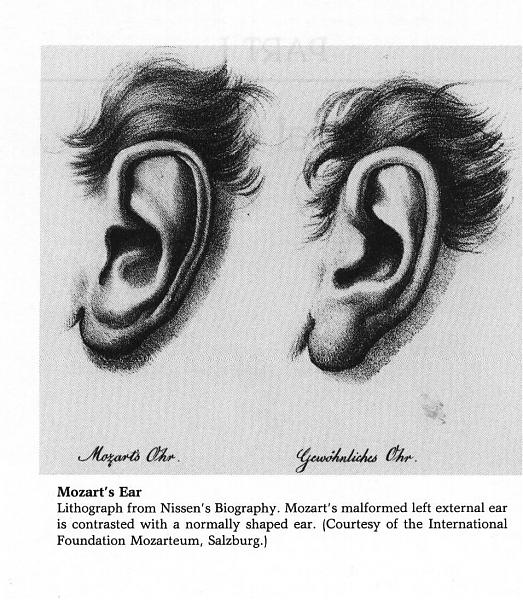
Representation of Mozart's left ear (left) and a normal ear (right), given in the biography of the composer by Mozart's widow's second husband, Georg Nikolaus von Nissen.

As Franz Xaver Niemetschek, one of his early biographers, wrote, "there was nothing special in [his] physique. ... He was small and his countenance, except for his large, intense eyes, showed no sign of his genius."

Mozart was described by tenor Michael Kelly, (Note: Because of his friendship with Mozart, Kelly was the first performer of the roles of Don Curzio and Don Basilio in the opera The Marriage of Figaro. See Andrés, p. 51.) actor and Irish singer of the Vienna Opera, in his work Reminiscences. This provides one of the most valuable and complete descriptions of Mozart's figure:

He favoured the company by performing fantasias and capriccios on the piano-forte. His feeling, the rapidity of his fingers, the great execution and strength of his left hand particularly, and the ap- parent inspiration of his modulations, astounded me. After this splendid performance we sat down to supper, and I had the pleasure to be placed at table between him and his wife. After supper the young branches of his family had a dance, and Mozart joined them. Madame Mozart told me that, great as his genius was, he was an enthusiast in dancing.
He was a remarkably small man, very thin and pale, with a profusion of fine fair hair, of which he was rather vain. He gave me a cordial invitation to his house, of which I availed myself, and passed a great deal of my time there. He always received me with kindness and hospitality. He was remarkably fond of punch, of which beverage I have seen him take copious draughts. He was also fond of billiards and had an excellent billiard table in his house. Many and many a game have I played with him, but always came off second best. He gave Sunday concerts, at which I was never missing. He was kind- hearted, and always ready to oblige; but so very particular, when he played, that if the slightest noise were made, he instantly left off.

From direct accounts of the composer's physique, various specialists on Mozart's life conclude that he was a man of small stature and was very thin and pale. His short height is attested by the diary of Count Ludwig von Bentheim-Steinfurt, Mozart's contemporary aristocrat who attended one of his concerts, held on 15 October 1790 at the City Theatre in Frankfurt, at which Mozart performed several pieces. In the entry for October 15, the count states that "Herr Mozart is a small man, of pleasing figure." His pallor, short stature and thinness are also attested to by some comments sent in 1792, together with the notes of Maria Anna Mozart, Wolfgang's sister, for the future biography of Friedrich Schlichtegroll:

Mozart's parents were the best-looking couple in Salzburg of their time, and in their younger years the daughter passed for possessing remarkable beauty. But the son, Wolfgang, was small, thin, of pale complexion and without any extraordinary appearance in his outward appearance and figure.

His face was marked by the smallpox he suffered in his childhood, and he had thick, fine, fair hair, which he wore pulled back in a ponytail. (Note: In his life's later years, he did not wear wig, but sported his own hair. See Landon (1988, p. 28).) Mozart's left ear was missing the usual circumvolution or concha (this rare congenital malformation is now known in medical literature under the name "Mozart's ear"). (Note: See margin image.)

He was rather clumsy in holding objects, especially small objects, and he could not stop fiddling or drumming his hands when talking to someone or when eating: his body was always in motion.

For her part, Constanze later wrote that "he was a tenor, rather soft in oratory and delicate in singing, but when something excited him, or it was necessary to exert himself, he was as powerful as he was energetic."

=== Illnesses ===
Given his thin and weak build, Mozart was from the age of six a person who suffered from numerous illnesses throughout his life, which gradually deteriorated his health until leading to his death at age thirty-five. Thus, he contracted a streptococcal infection in the upper airways in 1762, later suffering from erythema nodosum, which Dr. Peter J. Davies of St Vincent's Hospital, Melbourne, Australia, considers to be of probable streptococcal origin. In the same year, he contracted a new streptococcal infection and suffered a mild attack of rheumatic fever. In 1764, he suffered from tonsillitis, and in 1765 he contracted it again, in this case complicated with sinusitis. At the end of that year, he suffered an endemic typhoid fever that led to a coma, the following year he suffered a new attack of rheumatic fever. In 1767, he contracted smallpox, three years later he would suffer frostbite during his travels in Italy, and in 1771 he suffered from tracheobronchitis with jaundice. Three years later, he suffered an acute tooth abscess; four years after that, he had a viral infection of the upper airways, and in 1780 an upper airway infection complicated by bronchitis.

At the age of twenty-five, in 1781, he contracted a viral infection, but it was in 1784 when he suffered a serious illness in Vienna, whose symptoms are terrible colics ending in violent vomiting, and inflammatory rheumatic fever, which could have originated a chronic kidney disease. This infection is considered to be the origin of his death seven years later. In 1787, Mozart "again contracted a streptococcal infection which gave rise to a second occurrence of Henoch–Schönlein purpura; in addition, his kidneys, already in poor condition, were further damaged."

=== Portraits and paintings of the composer ===
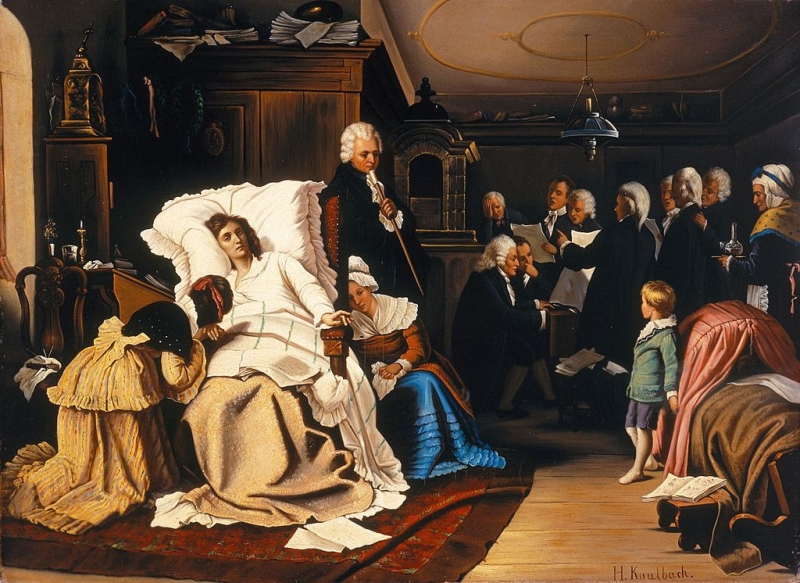
Mozarts letzte Tage (Mozart's Last Days) by Hermann Kaulbach (1873), painted eighty-two years after Mozart's death.

Currently, there are more than sixty Mozart portraits and pictorial representations of all kinds, despite the fact that many of them show little fidelity to the model.

Arthur Hutchings pointed out the contradiction between the enormous number of pictures said to represent Mozart and their scant value as likenesses. For his part, Alfred Einstein, also a Mozart specialist, expressed his opinion about these portraits in the following statement:

No earthly remains of Mozart survived save a few wretched portraits, no two of which are alike.

No painter of the first rank ever portrayed Mozart, unless a portrait of a child by French artist Jean-Baptiste Greuze shows him, which German iconographers have so far rejected. On the other hand, one of the characteristics of the 18th century as far as painting is concerned was precisely, although only in some schools, the lack of fidelity to the features of the reproduced model.

All this led Arthur Schurig to state in 1923 the following:

Mozart has been the subject of more portraits quite unrelated to his actual appearance than any other famous man. An adoring posterity has not conceived a more incorrect physical image of any other notability.

These statements led the musicologists and art historians to undertake a rigorous analysis of all existing paintings, sketches, drawings, cameos and engravings of the composer. The conclusion of this was that only eight works of art, all of them of unequal interest, were produced by authors who knew Mozart directly, or by sketches taken from drawings made from life. Even so, several handsomely produced Mozart "biographies in pictures" have kept many doubtful portraits in the minds of music lovers.

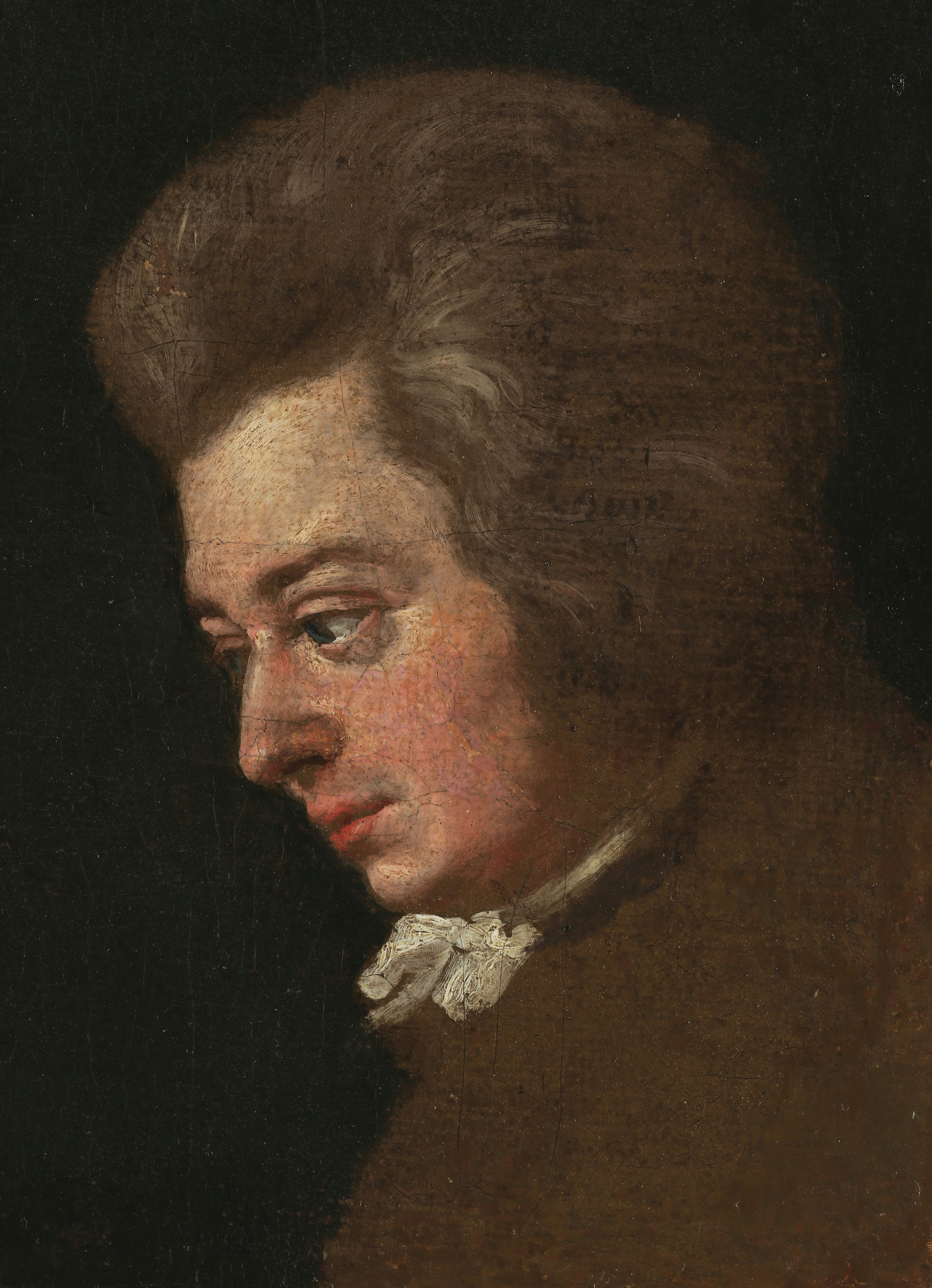
Detail of the unfinished portrait of Mozart at the piano by his brother-in-law Joseph Lange. This is considered by Constanze to be the best of all her husband's portraits.

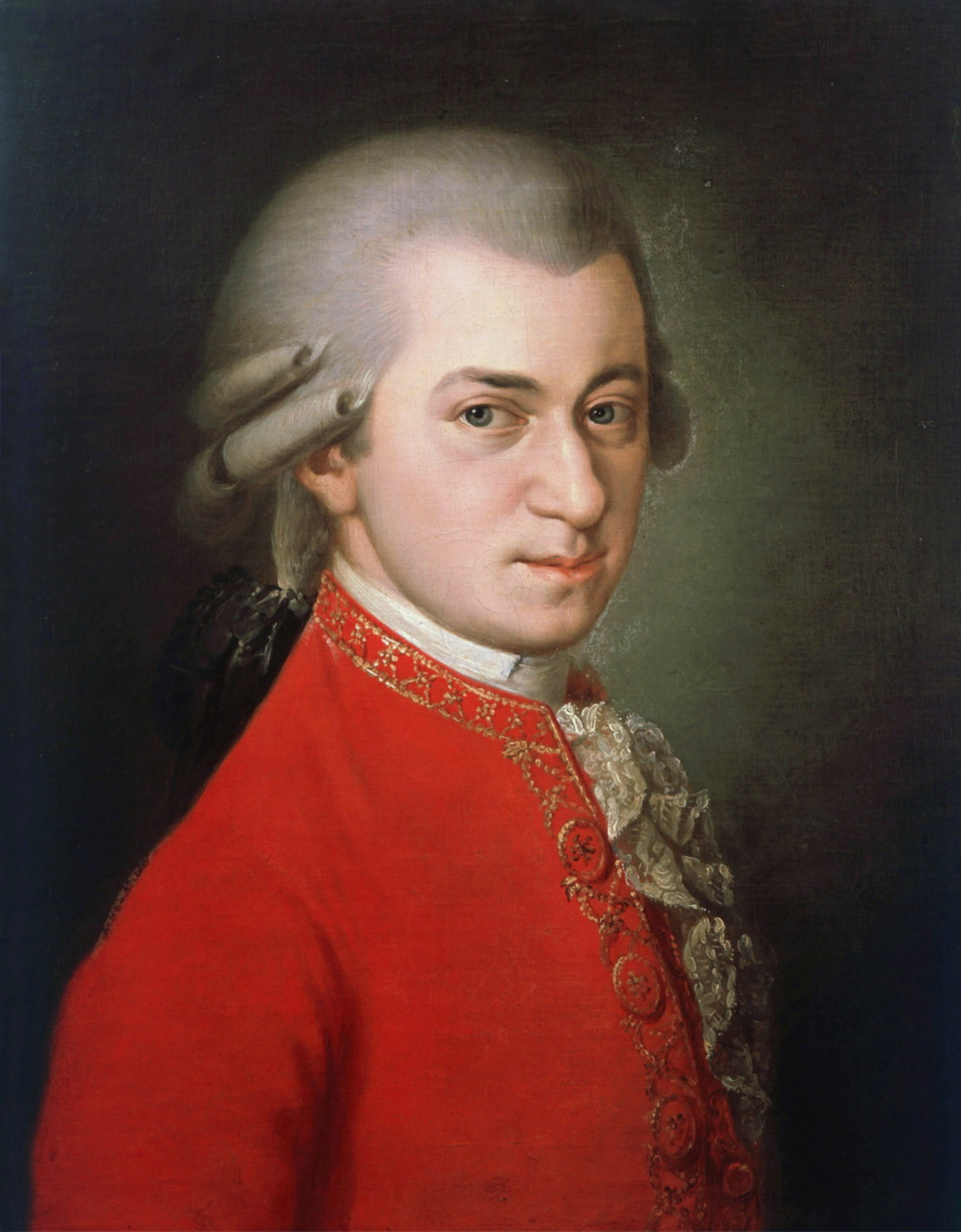
Portrait completed by Barbara Krafft in 1819. The portrait, despite having been painted almost thirty years after the composer's death, is considered one of his most faithful representations, since the author used as a model three works faithful to the original that Wolfgang's sister made available to her. The work was requested from the artist by Joseph Sonnleithner, with the intention of including it in his gallery of composers.

The portraits that have not been authenticated include those attributed to the following artists: Pompeo Girolamo Battoni, François Joseph Bosio, Breitkopf, Joseph Duplessis, Nicolò Grassi, Jean-Baptiste Greuze, Klass, Langernhöffel, Rigaud, Saint-Aubin, Van Smissen, Thelott, Tischbein, and Johann Zoffany. Nevertheless, the study of these portraits can be interesting since, although they are not faithful to the physical features of the composer, they provide important iconographic data, either on musical instruments, or on other personalities that appear in them.

The portrait painted by Barbara Krafft in 1819 is, despite having been painted almost thirty years after the composer's death, considered one of his most faithful representations. This is because Krafft relied on portraits made during Mozart's lifetime and considered by the composer's sister to bear a strong resemblance to him. Thus, Krafft took as models the family portrait by Della Croce (1780–1781) and the unfinished oil painting by Joseph Lange (reproduced in the right margin), which were provided to her by Mozart's own sister, in Salzburg.

Apart from any iconographic study, the current knowledge about the similarity of the portraits with respect to the figure of Mozart is rather based on opinions that are a reliable source, such as, for example, the testimony and descriptions of some of his friends, his wife or his sons.

Finally, it is worth mentioning that the portrait of Mozart by his brother-in-law, Joseph Lange (depicted in the right margin) is now considered to be the most accurate representation of the composer. Lange was the husband of Constanze's older sister, Aloysia Weber, and worked as an actor. Despite being only an amateur painter, his work was considered by Constanze to be the best of all portraits of her husband, stating:

Undoubtedly, the one painted by Madame Lange's husband, which, although it is an unfinished work, bears an admirable resemblance.

Maria Anna Mozart, sister of the composer, also admitted that the portrait's resemblance to the model was uncanny.

== Clothing ==
Mozart's clothes were expensive and followed the latest fashion, whatever his financial situation, and Constanze's dresses were presumably no less elegant. This suggests that he attached great importance to his outward appearance.

Mozart was intensely socially active, including such duties as appearing at court functions, (Note: He had to conduct the orchestra at the numerous court balls at which his compositions were performed. See Landon (1988, p. 27)) visiting the elegant halls of the likes of Johann Tost and Court Councillor Greiner, and frequenting Prague court circles and receptions in his capacity as Hofcompositeur (court composer). His wife attended many of these events; this meant that the Mozarts had to be well dressed, and Mozart's hair required constant attention. On the latter point, the direct testimony of his hairdresser, herr Haderlein, has been preserved:

While I was doing Mozart's hair one morning, just as I was finishing his ponytail, Mozart suddenly jumped up and, although I was still holding his ponytail in my hands, he went into the next room, dragging me behind him, and began to play the piano. Admiring his playing and the beautiful tonality of the instrument – it was the first time I had ever heard a piano like that – I let go of his ponytail and did not finish combing his hair until he got up. One day, as I was turning the corner from Kärtnerstrasse into Himmelpfortgasse to go to Mozart's service, he rode up, stopped, and, as he walked a few steps forward, took a small tablet [out of his pocket] and began to write music. I spoke to him again, asking if he could receive me, and he said yes.

Musicologist Bernhard Paumgartner (1991) believes that Mozart not only attached importance to his appearance for social reasons, but also because he suffered from a lack of physical qualities. The actor Backhaus is said to have taken him for a tailor's officer, and to the poet Johann Ludwig Tieck, who saw him in Berlin in May 1789, hovering restlessly around the music stands of an empty, dark hall where The Abduction from the Seraglio (KV 384) was to be performed, he seemed a man of trivial figure. Sociologist Norbert Elias (1991) also emphasizes the insignificance of his appearance, although he points out that his countenance is friendly and humanly pleasing.

There is no information on how Constanze Mozart dressed, but we do know what her husband's clothing was like in 1791, thanks to the Order of Suspension (Note: In German Sperrs-Relation, an account of belongings of a person carried out after their death. See Deutsch (1961, p. 495), and Landon (1988, p. 28).) drawn up in December of the same year, after the composer's death. This document has an inventory of his clothing and personal effects:

- 1 white cloth coat.
- 1 blue ditto.
- 1 red ditto.
- 1 ditto in nanquin color (yellow or suede).
- 1 ditto in brown satin with breeches, embroidered in silk.
- 1 full suit of black cloth.
- 1 brown greatcoat.
- 1 ditto of lighter cloth.
- 1 blue cloth jacket with fur.
- 1 ditto Kiria with fur trim.
- 4 assorted vests, 9 assorted breeches, two ordinary hats, 3 pairs of boots, 3 pairs of shoes.
- 9 pairs of silk stockings.
- 9 shirts.
- 4 white handkerchiefs, 1 night cap, 18 pocket handkerchiefs.
- 8 underpants, 2 nightshirts, 5 pairs of socks.

Such a wardrobe was what a well-to-do merchant might have: these were expensive and luxurious clothes. Kelly recalled him at the first full rehearsal of The Marriage of Figaro:

Mozart was on the stage with his crimson pelisse and gold-laced cocked hat, giving the time of the music to the orchestra.

Mozart's wardrobe appears to have been purchased according to the latest fashion; according to Else Radant, in an appendix to H. C. Robbins Landon's study of Mozart's last year, he probably had to acquire elegant clothes for the coronation festivities in Frankfurt, (Note: Reference is made to the coronation of Emperor Leopold II of Austria as king of Bohemia, in the year 1791. For the celebrations of that event, Mozart composed his penultimate opera, La clemenza di Tito, which was premiered at the National Theater in Prague on September 6, conducted by the composer himself. See Landon (1988, ch. IX: "Coronation Diary")) for attendance at public concerts and private receptions. The following excerpt from a contemporary newspaper gives an idea of the fashion of the time:

Shorts have been worn for a long time... in worsted (for everyday wear) and in summer in straw color; also in ash gray and the couleur sur couleur striped nanquin (the latest fashion); also in off-white, greenish or sulfur-colored fabric... Another very used garment is the vest... Now they are beginning to wear plain, striped or checked Manchester [cotton].... Boots are also beginning to be worn... if shoes are worn it is with... steel-grey silk stockings. [The Coat] reaches almost to the shoes and is worn in all colors.

An illustration of "an elegant German dressed in the latest fashion" is included and his costume is described:

The elegant gentleman is a combination of English and French.

After the composer's death, his estate was valued at 592 guilders and 9 kreutzer, of which 55 guilders were for costumes and undergarments. Among the outstanding debts (totaling 918 guilders and 16 kreutzer) were three considerable bills including that of a tailor, to whom he owed 282 guilders and 7 kreutzer.

== Personality and beliefs ==
As numerous testimonies of the time claim, the most characteristic trait of Mozart's personality was his optimism. When the English musician and publisher couple Vincent and Mary Novello interviewed Constanze in 1829 and asked her about her husband's character, she replied without hesitation: "He was always cheerful."

Most researchers point to Mozart's childish and even somewhat irresponsible character, which led him, at times, to make impulsive decisions. This idea is supported by the same comments sent in 1792 with Maria Anna Mozart's notes for Schlichtegroll's future biography:

Except for his music he remained a child, and this is the main characteristic of the dark side of his personality: he always needed a father, a mother or someone to look after him; he was incapable of managing money; he married, against his father's will, a young woman who was not at all suitable for him, and hence the great disorder in his home during and after his death.

Mozart was also described by his contemporaries as a hospitable man, generous, reserved about his creative work and a workaholic. On the other hand, he had great self-esteem and could, at times, come across as somewhat proud. Although he was not regarded as physically robust, he seems to have had plenty of physical and nervous stamina until his illness lowered his spirits. He was outgoing, sociable and nonconformist, since he refused to accept the "status" of servants that musicians had at the time, which caused him no small amount of trouble in the course of his existence.

Although, in some cases, heavily doubted and scrutinized, a crucial aspect in understanding Mozart's personality derives from the writings of Friedrich Rochlitz, who edited and compiled anecdotes for the first volume of the Breitkopf & Härtel publication Allgemeine musikalische Zeitung. These anecdotes, sourcing information from Schlichtegroll's obituary in 1793, material provided by Nannerl, the family archives, and first-hand recounts from Salzburg trumpeter Johann Andreas Schachtner. Many of the anecdotes, whether apocryphal or not, display a particular dissatisfaction that Mozart held for inadequate or misjudged performances of his works. Based on Rochlitz and Otto Jahn's confirmation of said story, the concert given by Mozart at the Gewandhaus on 12 May 1789 was subject to an apparent "experiment" that the composer played with the orchestra at his disposal. According to Rochlitz, Mozart:

[T]ook the first movement to be rehearsed–it was the Allegro of one of his symphonies–very, very fast. Scarcely twenty bars were played and–it was easy to predict–the orchestra lagged behind the proper tempo, dragging. Mozart stopped, pointed out how they were at fault, called 'Ancora' and began once again just as fast. The result was the same. He did everything to hold the tempo steady; once he pounded out the beat so powerfully that one of his magnificently worked steel shoe-buckles broke in pieces; but it was all in vain.

Mozart's impatience with scenarios of this kind was also reiterated by his widow in a recount she made to Vincent and Mary Novello: 'occasionally [Wolfgang] would stamp with his foot when impatient, or things to not go correctly in the orchestra'.

On this social nonconformism that Mozart displayed throughout his life, it is worth mentioning the parting of ways with his employer, Hieronymus von Colloredo, Prince-Archbishop of Salzburg, who had an excellent relationship with the composer's father. (Note: Leopold Mozart held the position of concertmaster in the archiepiscopal orchestra, and composed numerous works for the archbishop. Although he criticized him harshly in correspondence with Wolfgang, he always showed submission and respect for Colloredo. See Deutsch (1961, p. 31).) Because of his cheerful and cosmopolitan spirit, the composer gradually distanced himself from the archbishop, who thought him "insufferably insolent." In Vienna in 1781, a harsh confrontation between the two led Mozart to present a letter of resignation, and the affair ended with the famous "farewell kick" that Count Arco, a member of the archbishop's court, gave Mozart in the backside. Count Arco had repeatedly refused to accept the letter of resignation that Mozart had presented.

In correspondence with his father, Mozart recounts how the meeting with Count Arco unfolded:

What a way to soften people up! He did not dare, out of cowardice, to say anything to the Archbishop and kept me in suspense for a month before finally kicking me in the ass. That's a hell of a thing to do!

Leopold was deeply troubled by the fear of losing his salary, as Wolfgang wrote to him in anger, listing the numerous reprisals he planned to carry out against the count.

... I shall write very soon to that ill-fated man to tell him what I think of him, and as soon as he stands before my eyes I shall give him a kick that he will remember in his flesh forever... Although I am not a count, I have more gallantry and honor in my heart than many of those who enjoy such a title. Whoever insults me, be he a lackey or a count, will deserve my contempt.

In reality, Leopold's fears were unfounded: Mozart might vent his anger and pride in a letter or two, but he was no longer a reckless youth.

Mozart generally worked long and energetically, completing compositions at a great pace due to tight deadlines. He often made sketches and outlines although, unlike Ludwig van Beethoven, these have not been preserved, as Constanze destroyed them after his death. With regard to his own compositions, Mozart was wont to judge them impartially, and often with a severity and rigor that he would not easily have endured from another person.

When it came to money management, Mozart was rather carefree, but not as carefree as popular belief claims. However, this attitude led him to spend it sometimes excessively, and to depend for several years on loans made to him by some friends, especially Johann Michael Puchberg. (Note: Johann Michael Puchberg (1741–1822) was an Austrian merchant, friend and brother Mason of Mozart and, at the time, treasurer of the lodge Zur wahren Eintracht. See Landon (1988, p. 16).) On the other hand, and since settling in Vienna, Mozart lived long periods of time during which he did not possess a fixed salary. Once, on a trip the composer took to Berlin, King Frederick William II of Prussia offered him three thousand escudos in fees if he wished to take up residence at his court and take over the direction of his orchestra. Mozart refused the proposal, replying, "I like living in Vienna; the emperor loves me, and money matters little to me." Music publishers and theater impresarios abused Mozart's well-known disinterest in money to such an extent that most of his piano compositions yielded him nothing. Also, performances of Mozart's operas in Germany brought him fame, but no money, due to the non-existence of "performance rights"; and German publishers could reprint Mozart's music at will without consulting him, since there was no copyright law either.

He was brought up according to Catholic morals, but without coercion or spiritual fetters that might divert the free initiative of genius. He was a loyal member of the Catholic Church at all stages of his life, despite belonging to Freemasonry for the last seven years of his life. This was possible because in Mozart's time, Freemasonry was considered an enlightened extension of Christian beliefs, so that being Catholic and Mason was not mutually exclusive, but perfectly compatible.

== Training and intellectual qualities ==
Mozart was a cultured and enlightened person, fluent in German, Italian and French, with a good knowledge of Latin; he experienced a deep interest in reading, especially for the literature of William Shakespeare, and was drawn to the Fine Arts. According to Hutchings, Leopold Mozart gave his son a better education than the boys who attended the celebrated Imperial School in Vienna, such as the Haydn brothers and Schubert, who were trained there as choristers in little more than Latin and music, both instrumental and vocal. Arthur Hutchings, musicologist and specialist in the life and work of Mozart, stresses that Mozart was properly educated and had interests beyond music.

He possessed great skill in languages and in mathematics (especially algebra), his favorite childhood subject. Moreover, he had absolute pitch, an innate quality invaluable in music, as well as a prodigious photographic and auditory memory, which enabled him to retain ideas in his head for years. To these two qualities testifies the famous anecdote of the Miserere by Gregorio Allegri: this musicalization of the fiftieth psalm was performed during Holy Week in the Sistine Chapel. Considered patrimony of the Vatican, the execution of the work outside the Chapel was strictly forbidden, under penalty of excommunication for whoever copied it. However, on his trip to Italy in Holy Week of 1770, Mozart attended with his father the performance of the Wednesday Miserere in the Sistine Chapel, and made a point of retaining it by heart. Thus, when he returned that evening to the inn where he was staying, he put it in writing. The next day he went back with his transcription hidden in his hat, but a different Miserere was sung; on Good Friday the first one was performed again, after which he made some corrections. Shortly afterwards, Pope Clement XIV made Mozart, then fourteen years old, a knight of the Order of the Golden Spur in the first class.

== Environment ==
Mozart was invited to the homes of intellectuals and counted many of them among his friends even before he became a Freemason.

Maynard Solomon considers that the three closest friends of the composer may have been Gottfried Janequin, Count August Hatzfeld, and Sigmund Barisani. Many others included among his friendships his longtime colleague Joseph Haydn, the singers Franz Xaver Gerl and Benedikt Schack, and the horn Joseph Leutgeb. Leutgeb and Mozart maintained a curious kind of friendly banter, often with Leutgeb being the butt of Mozart's practical jokes. Mozart dedicated a series of six string quartets to Haydn.

== Hobbies ==
He enjoyed playing billiards, possibly because it was a form of exercise. He also loved dancing, especially masquerades, which he always attended dressed as a harlequin. He had several pets: a canary, a starling, a dog, and also a horse for playful riding. There is not the slightest indication that Mozart engaged in gambling (except billiards or home card games, with small stakes), and he certainly did not go to the famous Viennese gambling dens, since, among other things, his purchasing power did not allow it. He was fond of drinking coffee in a cup, as well as smoking a pipe, but in moderation.

== Humor ==
Mozart enjoyed pranks, puns, humorous misspellings, emphatic all caps, and scatological humor.

He often humorously misspelled his own name. A few examples include "GNAGFLOW TRAZOM" (in all caps), and the jocular faux-Latin "Johannes, Chrysostomus, Amadeus, Wolfgangus, Sigismundus, Mozart" when introducing himself as a guilty party for staying up too late.

In 1777, he concluded a typical letter to his father with:

"Well, addio. I again kiss Papa's hands and embrace my sister and send greetings to all my good friends; now off to the closet run I, where perchance shit some muck shall I, and ever the same fool am I. WOLFGANG and AMADEUS MOZARTY, Augsburg, Octobery 25th, seventeen hundred and seventy seveny."

The above quote shows both his scatological humor as well as his affinity for humorous misspellings, including that of "seveny" and his own name ("MOZARTY"). He also had an affinity for using allcaps for emphasis, such as in his letter of May 14, 1778, in which he ranted to his father about an uninspired student, berating her inability to complete a basic composition.

In 1777, the 21-year-old Mozart also pranked a Herr Stein by denying his identity and introducing himself as "Trazom", then running to Herr Stein's piano and playing quickly to surprise his host.

Especially in his youth, Mozart had a special predilection for scatological humor, which is apparent in many of his surviving letters, especially those written to his cousin Maria Anna Thekla Mozart (around 1777 and 1778), but also in correspondence with his sister Nannerl and his parents. His playful letters to his cousin include passages such as 1777's "Huzza, copper-smith, come, be a man, catch if you can, lick my arse, copper-smith". Mozart also wrote canons on scatological texts, such as "Leck mich im Arsch" KV 231 (literally "Lick my arse", sometimes idiomatically translated as "Kiss my arse"), "Leck mir den Arsch fein recht schön sauber" and "O du eselhafter Peierl".

The Mozarteum Foundation acquired the final page of a letter of 4 November 1777 in which Mozart, then 21 and staying in Mannheim, commissioned a Bölzlschiessen target, depicting a crudely humorous scene, for one of the target-shooting competitions popular among his family and friends in Salzburg. He described the scene as follows:

"...a small man with fair hair, bending over and showing his bare arse. From his mouth come the words: Enjoy the spread. The other figure should be shown in boots and spurs, a red suit and a beautiful wig according to the latest fashion; he must be of medium height and positioned in such a way that he appears to be licking the other man’s arse. From his mouth come the words: Just go ahead."

He also wrote the comic terzet "Liebes Manndel, wo ist's Bandel?" (1786).

His comedic 1787 composition "A Musical Joke" parodied musical trends of the time.

== Daily routine ==
As can be seen from a text written by Mozart himself, his daily program in 1782 (Note: This text was written by Mozart himself, and reflects his daily routine at the age of twenty-six, a year after he had taken up residence in Vienna, and a few months before he married Constanze Weber at St. Stephen's Cathedral, Vienna. See Sollers.) was as follows:

At six o'clock, I am always combed. At seven o'clock, fully dressed. Then I write until nine o'clock. From nine o'clock until one o'clock, I teach. Then I eat, when I am not invited, and in that case lunch is at two or three o'clock. I can't work before five or six o'clock, and often an academy [concert] prevents me from doing so; otherwise, I write until nine o'clock at night .... Because of the academies and the eventuality of being asked here or there, I am never sure of being able to compose in the afternoon, so I have got into the habit (especially when I get back early) of writing something before I go to bed. I often do so until one o'clock, only to get up again at six o'clock.

Months after this writing, Mozart married Constanze Weber; therefore, his routine underwent certain modifications from that moment on. Nevertheless, and as various entries in his diary after the marriage show, Mozart's daily life as a married man presented a rather similar organization, including some new activities, such as horseback riding in the early morning, and billiard games with his wife in the afternoon.

=== Compositional method ===
In general, Mozart worked energetically, finishing compositions at a great pace due to tight deadlines and the accumulation of commissions. He spent between five and seven hours a day composing, depending on whether he had a concert or not, which was usually divided between the early afternoon and the evening.

At the present time, the speed with which Mozart composed is well known. In a letter to his mother, the composer's sister, Nannerl Mozart, jokes that her brother is writing a sonata while he is mentally composing another one.

Thus it took Mozart a month to write the Piano Concerto No. 21, eighty-three pages long – many composers would have taken a month just to copy a concerto of such dimensions.

Mozart was able to write his Symphony "Linz", KV 425, in only five days, during his vacation period in the aforementioned city. This fact is reflected in Wolfgang's correspondence with his father: (Note: For the complete letter, see Wolfgang Amadé Mozart an Leopold Mozart in Salzburg, Linz, 31. Oktober 1783)

On Tuesday, 4th November, I will give a concert here in the theatre, and because I do not have a single symphony with me, I am working at breakneck speed on a new one, which must be ready by then....

— Letter from Wolfgang Amadeus Mozart to his father, dated Linz October 31, 1783.

Another example of his compositional speed is found in the overture of the opera Don Giovanni, on which Mozart worked only on the evening preceding the first performance and when the dress rehearsal had already taken place.

Mozart was not in the habit of making copies of his compositions, so he wrote them directly in the final version, without resorting to a prior draft. (Note: Probably, the reason Mozart avoided making drafts of his compositions was the time savings involved. See Burkholder, Grout & Palisca (2008, p. 629, footnote to illustration 22.3)) However, his autograph scores show surprisingly few corrections and revisions, since Mozart would put a work to paper only when it had already been completed in his mind.

Mozart used to follow a very peculiar compositional process, which was characterized by the fact that he did not finish a work completely, but left blank spaces in the sheet music that he was sure he would be able to remember after a while, and when the date of delivery or premiere of the work approached, he would fill in the empty spaces.

Thus, Mozart's usual method of working was to complete the first violins part, the second violins if necessary, and the bass and remaining parts, usually of a solo nature, if he deemed it necessary to aid his memory.

In the case of a large vocal work, such as the Great Mass (KV 427) or the Requiem (KV 626), Mozart notated the choir, the basso continuo and the ritornello sections of the orchestral and also usually the first violins and the complicated polyphonic or canonic entries of the strings or the solo sections of the woodwind instruments.

With such a particella, Mozart could have kept even a work of importance for up to three years, as he did with the Piano Concerto No. 27 (KV 595), then dust it off and "refill" it in due course.

== See also ==
- Mozart family grand tour
- Mozart's nationality

== Bibliography ==
- Andrés, Ramón (2003). Mozart: su vida y su obra (in Spanish). Barcelona: Ma Non Troppo (Ediciones Robinbook). ISBN 84-95601-50-8.
- Bory, Robert (1948). La vie de W. A. Mozart par l'image (in French).
- Burkholder, James P.; Grout, Donald J.; Palisca, Claude V. (2008) [1960]. Historia de la música occidental [History of Western Music] (in Spanish). Translated by Menéndez Torrellas, Gabriel (7th ed.). Madrid: Alianza. ISBN 978-84-206-9145-9.
- Davies, Peter J. (August 1984a). "Mozart's Illnesses and Death – 1. The Illnesses, 1756–90". The Musical Times. 125 (1698). doi:10.2307/963386. JSTOR 963386.
- Davies, Peter J. (October 1984b). "Mozart's Illnesses and Death – 2. The Last Year and the Fatal Illness". The Musical Times. 125 (1700). doi:10.2307/963687. JSTOR 963687.
- Deutsch, Otto Erich (1961). Mozart: die Dokumente seines Lebens (in German). Vol. II. Bärenreiter-Verlag.
- Einstein, Alfred (1945). Mozart, His Character, His Work. Oxford University Press.
- Elias, Norbert (2002) [1991]. Schröter, Michael (ed.). Mozart. Sociología de un genio [Mozart: The Sociology of a Genius] (in Spanish). Translated by Fernández-Villanueva, Marta; Strunk, Oliver. Barcelona: Península. ISBN 978-84-8307-528-9.
- Hutchings, Arthur (1976). Mozart: The Man, the Musician. New York: Schirmer Books. ISBN 0-02-871140-8.
- Kelly, Michael (1826). Reminiscences of Michael Kelly, of the King's Theatre, and Theatre Royal Drury Lane. Vol. 1. London: H. Colburn.
- Landon, H. C. Robbins (1983). Mozart and the Masons. New Light on the Lodge "Crowned Hope". London and New York: Thames and Hudson. ISBN 9780500550144.
- Landon, H. C. Robbins (1988). 1791: Mozart's Last Year. New York: Schirmer Books. ISBN 0-02-872592-1.
- Lorenz, Michael (2009). "Mozart's Apartment on the Alsergrund".
- Niemetschek, Franz Xaver (1956). Life of Mozart... Translation by Helen Mautner with an introduction by A. Hyatt King. London: L. Hyman.
- Niemetschek, Franz Xaver (1808). Lebensbeschreibung des K. K. Kapellmeisters Wolfgang Amadeus Mozart, aus Originalquellen (in German) (2nd ed.). Prague: Herrlische Buchhandlung.
- Nissen, Georg Nikolaus von (1828). Biographie W. A. Mozart's nach Originalbriefen (in German). Leipzig: Breitkopf & Härtel.
- Novello, Vincent; Novello, Mary. Hughes, Rosemary (ed.). A Mozart Pilgrimage, Being the Travel Diaries of Vincent and Mary Novello in the year 1829. Transcribed and compiled by Nerina Medici di Marignano. London.
- Paumgartner, Bernhard (1991). Mozart (in Spanish). Translated by Bas Álvarez, Belén. Madrid: Alianza Editorial. ISBN 84-206-8550-X.
- Pfannhauser, Karl (1973). "Epilegomena Mozartiana". Mozart-Jahrbuch 1971/72 (in German). Salzburg: 268–312.
- Schemann, Hans; Knight, Paul (1997). English-German Dictionary of Idioms. London and New York: Routledge. ISBN 0-415-17254-3.
- Schurig, Arthur (1923). Wolfgang Amadé Mozart. Vol. 2. Leipzig: Insel.
- Sollers, Philippe (2003). Misterioso Mozart (in Spanish). Translation by Anne-Hélène Suárez. Barcelona: Alba editorial. ISBN 84-8428-186-8.
- Solomon, Maynard (1995). Mozart: A Life. New York: HarperCollins. ISBN 0-06-019046-9.
- Solomon, Maynard (1991). "The Rochlitz Anecdotes: Issues of Authenticity in Early Mozart Biography". In Eisen, Cliff (ed.). Mozart Studies. Oxford: Clarendon Press. ISBN 0198161913.
- Stendhal (2000). Vida de Mozart (in Spanish). Translation by Consuelo Berges. Barcelona: Alba Editorial S. L. ISBN 84-8428-041-1.
- Zenger, Max (1941). "Falsche Mozartbildnisse". Mozart-Jahrbuch (in German). Salzburg: International Mozarteum Foundation. pp. 218–224.
