= Mozart's nationality =

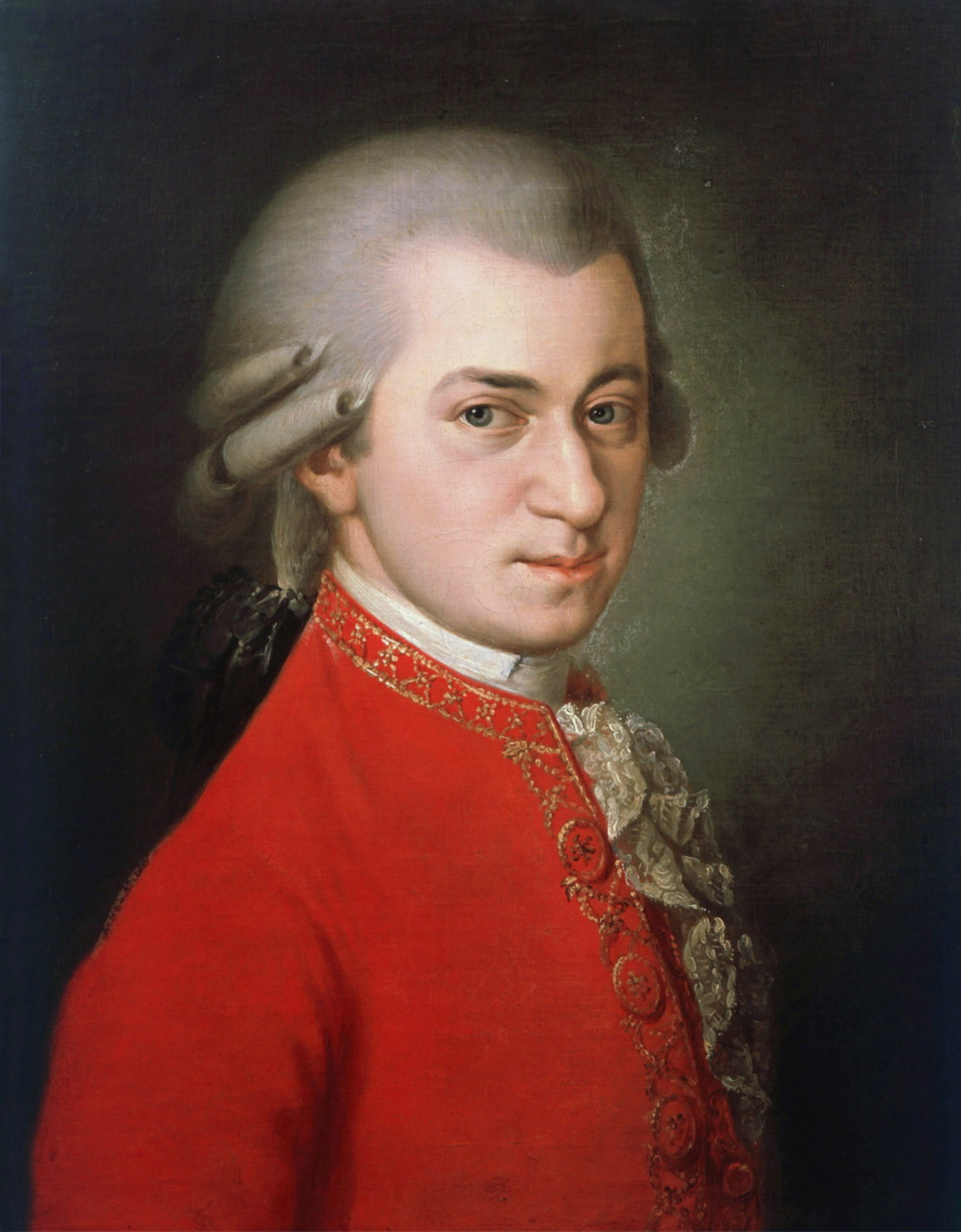
Mozart during his youth; posthumous painting by Barbara Krafft in 1819

The two main labels that have been used to describe the nationality of Wolfgang Amadeus Mozart are "Austrian" and "German". (Note: For details and citation, see section § Scholarly practice.) However, in Mozart's own life, both terms were used differently from the way they are used today, because the modern nation states of Austria and Germany did not yet exist. (Note: See discussion and references below. Modern Austria came into being in 1918; Germany in 1871.) Any decision to label Mozart as "Austrian" or "German" (or neither) involves political boundaries, history, language, culture, and Mozart's own views. Editors of modern encyclopedias and other reference sources differ in how they assign a nationality to Mozart (if any) in light of conflicting criteria.

== Salzburg ==
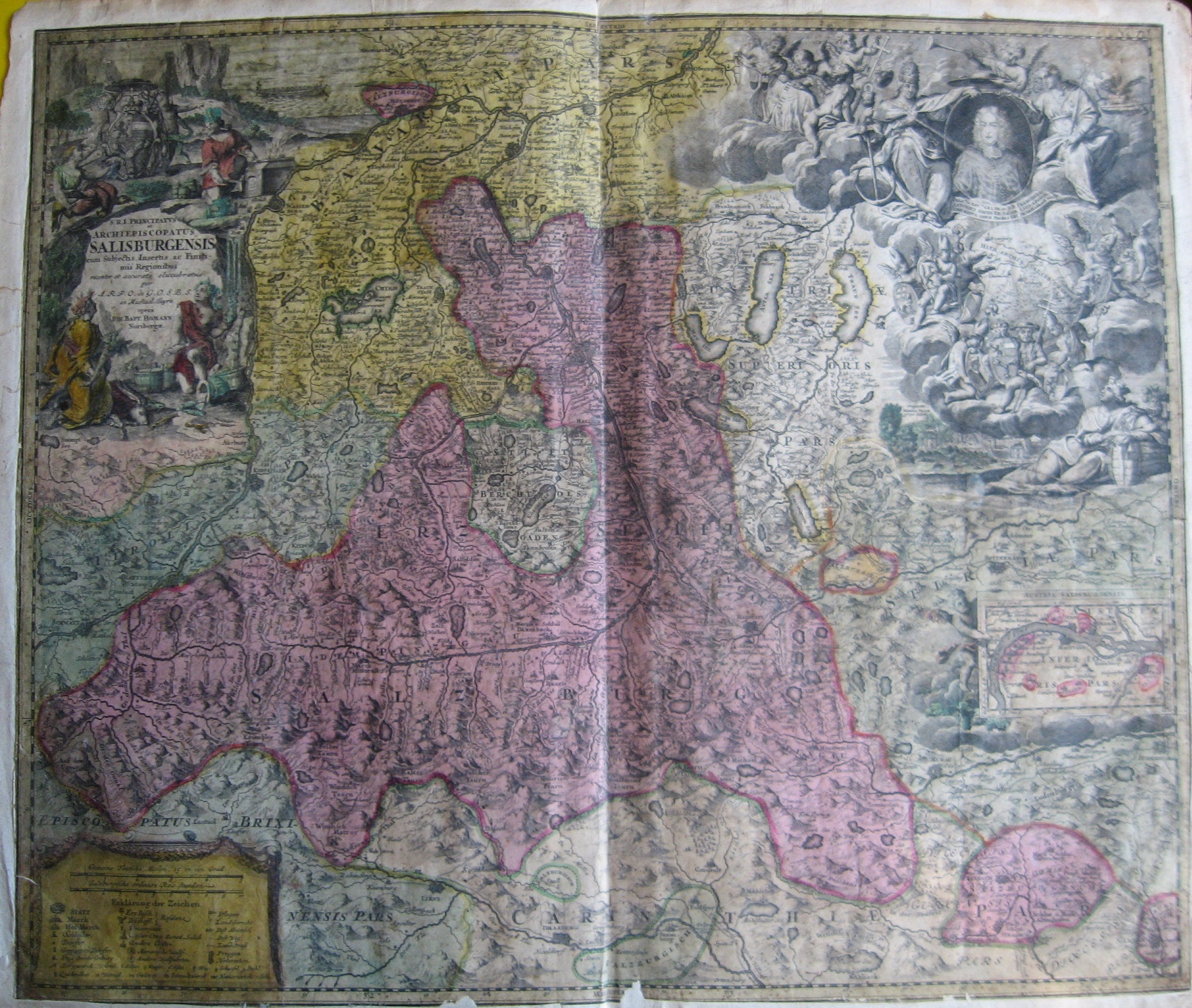
1715 map showing (in purple) the Archbishopric of Salzburg

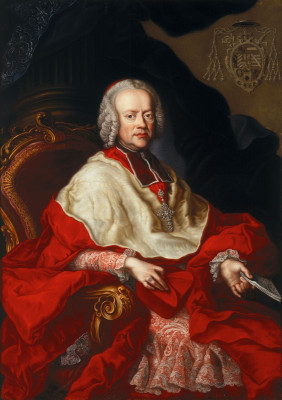
Sigismund von Schrattenbach was the ruling archbishop at Salzburg when Mozart was born and during his youth. He was a generous patron of the Mozart family.

Mozart was born in Salzburg, which was then the capital of the Prince-Archbishopric of Salzburg, a small, quasi-sovereign state in the Holy Roman Empire. Thus in one sense Mozart's nationality could be said to be "Salzburgian", (Note: In French, salzbourgeois was, and still is, fairly common. The German equivalent is quite common.) though English-language biographers do not generally use this term to designate his nationality. (Note: Mozart scholar Otto Erich Deutsch suggested that Mozart was actually not a citizen of Salzburg, but of Augsburg. Discussing Mozart's baptismal record, he writes that Mozart's father Leopold, born and raised in Augsburg (Mozarthaus Augsburg), "remained a citizen of that town, so that Nannerl and Wolfgang, though born at Salzburg, were actually Augsburg citizens" (Deutsch (1965), 9). At the time Augsburg was, like Salzburg, a free imperial city in the Holy Roman Empire.)

== Holy Roman Empire ==
The Archbishopric of Salzburg was but one of more than 300 similarly quasi-independent states in the part of Europe that was populated by German speakers. Most of these states, Salzburg included, were included in a larger political entity, the Holy Roman Empire. The Holy Roman Empire was German in various ways: most of its population was German-speaking, its official full name was the "Holy Roman Empire of the German Nation" (German: Heiliges Römisches Reich Deutscher Nation), it conducted most of its business in German, and one of the titles held by its emperor was "King in Germany." Derek Beales adds, "[the emperor] and the Empire were foci of German patriotism. Even in Hamburg, Protestant and remote from his court [in Vienna], prayers were regularly said for him and his birthday was celebrated."

For administrative purposes, the Holy Roman Empire was divided into imperial circles. The Austrian Circle included the Archduchy of Austria, as well as a number of other areas now part of modern Austria. Salzburg was not included; it was part of the Bavarian Circle.

== Austria ==
"Austria" in Mozart's time could mean (in increasing order of size), the Archduchy of Austria, the Austrian Circle, and the Habsburg-ruled lands. None of these included Salzburg.

Although Mozart was not born in Austria (as then defined), he had close connections there. He made three extended visits to Vienna in his youth, and in 1781 moved to Vienna to pursue his career; he remained there to the end of his life (1791).

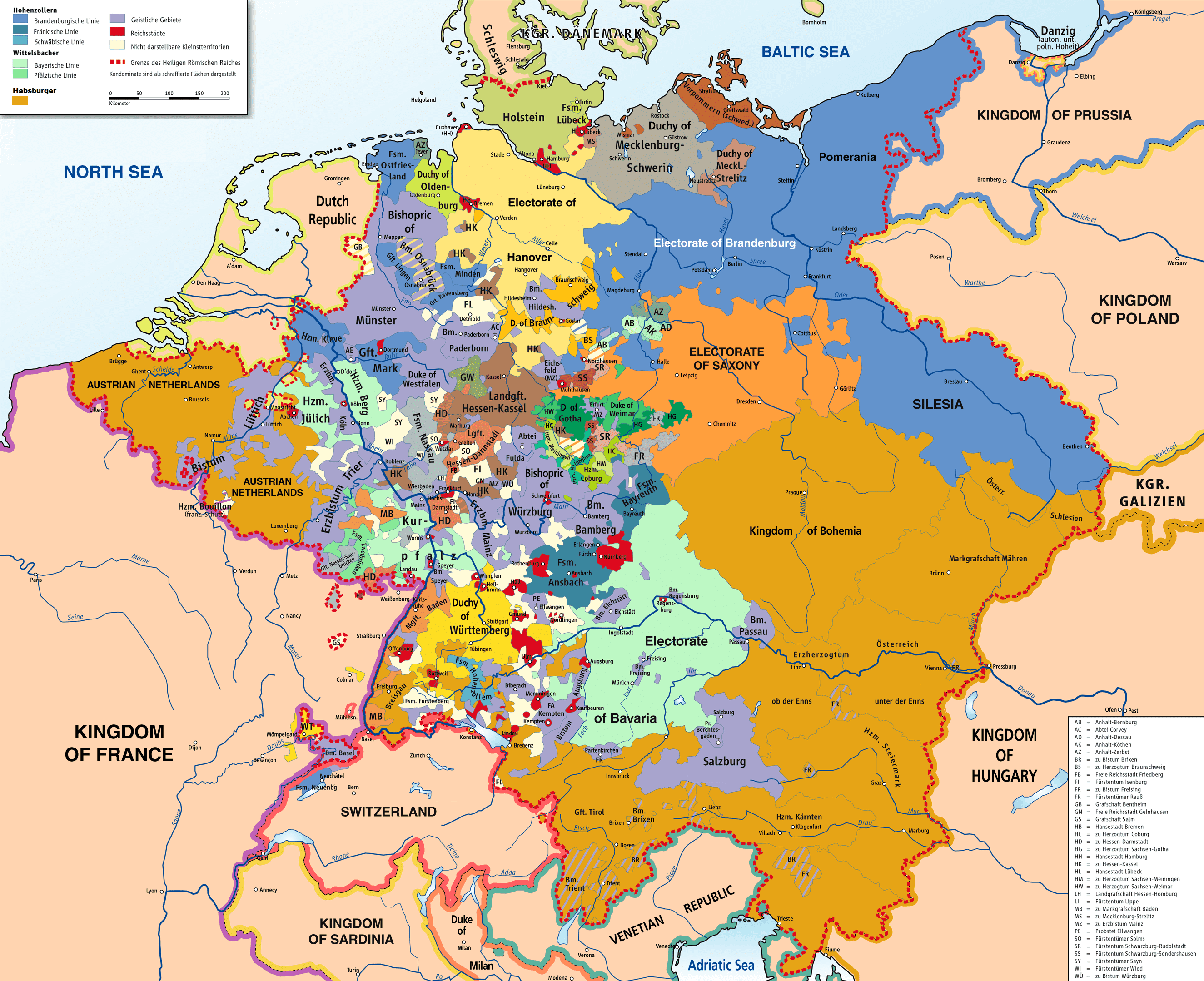
The Holy Roman Empire as of 1789, surrounded by a red dashed line. The Prince-Archbishopric of Salzburg, shaped somewhat like a thick inverted capital T, is shown in lavender (■) in the southern portion of the map, sandwiched between the extensive Habsburg territories (shown in orange-brown ■) and Bavaria (pale green ■).

== Germany ==
As noted above, there was no unified country called "Germany" during Mozart's life; rather, there were hundreds of quasi-independent German-speaking states, mostly in the "Holy Roman Empire of the German Nation". Of the German-speaking states, Prussia (blue on the map) was already on the rise, expanding its territory, and it was under Prussian leadership that Germany was ultimately unified in 1871.

However, the word "German" (in German: deutsch) was in use well before this time, designating the people of central Europe who shared German language and culture. For example, when in 1801 Mozart's old colleague Emanuel Schikaneder opened the Theater an der Wien in Vienna, a Leipzig music journal praised the new theater as "the most comfortable and satisfactory in the whole of Germany". The city of Salzburg, owing to its fine ecclesiastical architecture, was sometimes called "the German Rome".

Mozart himself used the word "German" in this sense, and apparently felt a sense of national or ethnic pride in being German. The following passage, from a letter to his father Leopold, born in modern day Germany and seen as a German by modern historic literature, attests to this:

I believe I am capable enough to bring honour to any court. If Germany, my beloved fatherland, of which I am (as you know) proud, will not accept me, then, in God's name, France or England will have to gain another skilled German – and that to the shame of the German nation. (Note: Letter of 17 August 1782, quoted from Mersmann 1972, p.. The original reads: "Ich glaube so viel im Stande zu seyn, daß ich jedem Hofe Ehre machen werde. Will mich Teutschland, mein geliebtes Vaterland, worauf ich (wie Sie wissen) stolz bin, nicht aufnehmen, so muß in Gottes Namen Frankreich oder England wieder um einen geschickten Teutschen mehr reich werden, – und das zur Schande der teutschen Nation." (taken from Abert 2007 (online in German at Zeno.org.)

A series of similar recorded utterances from Mozart is given by Kerst (1906). From this evidence, it is clear that Mozart considered himself to be German. However, for the reasons just given, the relevant sense is necessarily a linguistic or cultural one, there being no nation-state of "Germany" of which Mozart could have been a citizen. Roselli (1998, 10) asserts that "Mozart was born into a part of Europe where nationality in the modern sense did not exist."

== Summary ==
Conclusions have been drawn that Mozart is of one nationality or another. He was Austrian because the town in which he was born and raised is now in Austria, and because he made his career in Vienna, the Austrian capital. He was German because he felt and described himself to be German, and because the Holy Roman Empire of the German Nation that included Salzburg was labeled as and felt to be German. He was neither Austrian nor German because Salzburg was neither part of the Habsburg Austrian possessions nor part of a yet to exist Austrian or German nation-state.

== Scholarly practice ==
The scholars who prepare biographies and reference works, if they choose to characterize Mozart as being of a nationality in any modern sense, have used varied language:

The Grove Dictionary of Music and Musicians calls Mozart an Austrian composer, as do the Houghton Mifflin Dictionary of Biography (2003), the Oxford Concise Dictionary of Music (Bourne & Kennedy (2004)) and the NPR Listener's Encyclopedia of Classical Music (Libbey 2006). The practice of the Encyclopædia Britannica (Note: Discussion here refers to the 1988 edition.) is split: the brief anonymous summary ("Micropedia") article calls him Austrian, but the main article ("Macropedia"), written by H. C. Robbins Landon, makes no mention of a nationality.

Sources describing Mozart as German are more abundant in earlier work, particularly before the founding of the modern nation-state of Austria in 1918. A London newspaper, reporting the composer's death in 1791, referred to him as "the celebrated German composer". In Lieber & et al. (1832), 78, Mozart is introduced as "the great German composer"; Ferris (1891) included Mozart in a book called The Great German Composers. Other descriptions of Mozart as German appear in Kerst (1906), 3, Mathews & Liebling (1896), and MacKey & Haywood (1909); also (much later) Hermand & Steakley (1981).

Sources have sometimes changed their practice over time. The Grove dictionary did not always call Mozart "Austrian"; the designation appears to have been added with the first edition of the "New Grove" in 1980. Similarly, Baker's Biographical Dictionary of Musicians did not originally offer a nationality but added the word "Austrian" to its opening sentence for the 8th edition (1992) and has retained it since. The Encyclopædia Britannica, now an "Austrian" source, listed Mozart as a German composer in 1911.

Peter Branscombe's brief biography begins with the description "composer and keyboard player"—in an encyclopedia that otherwise always specifies the nationality of composers, suggesting a deliberate omission of nationality. Other authors who say nothing about Mozart's nationality (whether deliberately or not) are Hermann Abert, Maynard Solomon, and Robbins Landon, mentioned above; and among encyclopedias the Riemann Musiklexikon (1961), and the International Cyclopedia of Music and Musicians (1985). The prestigious German music encyclopedia Die Musik in Geschichte und Gegenwart lists no nationality, but this follows the policy it applies to all composers.

Some sources mention both nationalities: the Brockhaus Riemann Musik Lexikon (1975) begins its article "composer, on the father's side of Augsburg-south German ancestry; on the mother's side Salzburg-Austrian". (Note: Original German "Komponist, vom Vater her augsburgisch-süddeutscher, von der Mutter her salzburgisch-östr. Abstammung".) Julian Rushton, in his Mozart biography, summarizes many of the facts given above and concludes: "Mozart, by modern criteria Austrian, counted himself a German composer."

== Notes, references, sources ==
=== Sources ===
- Abert, Hermann (2007) [1924]. W. A. Mozart. Translated by Stewart Spencer. footnotes by Cliff Eisen (New ed.). New Haven: Yale University Press.
- Beales, Derek (2006a). "Austria, Austrian, Austrian Monarchy". In Cliff Eisen; Simon P. Keefe (eds.). The Cambridge Mozart Encyclopedia. Cambridge: Cambridge University Press.
- Beales, Derek (2006b). "Germany". In Cliff Eisen; Simon P. Keefe (eds.). The Cambridge Mozart Encyclopedia. Cambridge: Cambridge University Press.
- Bourne, Joyce; Kennedy, Michael (2004). The Concise Oxford Dictionary of Music. Oxford: Oxford University Press.
- Branscombe, Peter (2006). "Wolfgang Amadeus Mozart". In Cliff Eisen; Simon P. Keefe (eds.). The Cambridge Mozart Encyclopedia. Cambridge: Cambridge University Press. pp. 304–343. ISBN 978-0-521-85659-1.
- Clive, Peter (1993). Mozart and His Circle: A Biographical Dictionary. New Haven: Yale University Press.
- Deutsch, Otto Erich (1965). Mozart: A Documentary Biography. Stanford: Stanford University Press.
- Eisen, Cliff (2007). Introduction. Mozart: The First Biography. By Niemetschek, Franz Xaver. Translated by Helene Mautner. Berghahn Books.
- Ferris, George T. (1891). The Great German Composers. New York: D. Appleton.
- Halliwell, Ruth (2006). "Colloredo, Hieronymus Franz de Paula von". In Cliff Eisen; Simon P. Keefe (eds.). The Cambridge Mozart Encyclopedia. Cambridge: Cambridge University Press.
- Hermand, Jost; Steakley, James, eds. (1981). Writings of German Composers: Bach, Mozart, Mendelssohn, Wagner, Brahms, Mahler, Strauss, Weill, and others. Continuum.
- Heartz, Daniel (1995). Haydn, Mozart and the Viennese School: 1740–1780. New York: W. W. Norton & Company.
- Honolka, Kurt (1990). Papageno: Emanuel Schikaneder, Man of the Theater in Mozart's Time. Hal Leonard.
- The Houghton Mifflin Dictionary of Biography (2003) Houghton Mifflin Harcourt
- Kerst, Friedrich (1906). Mozart: the Man and the Artist, as Revealed in His Own Words. Translated by Henry Edward Krehbiel. London: Gay and Bird.
- Kuhn, Laura, ed. (2001). Baker's Biographical Dictionary of Musicians. New York: Schirmer Books.
- Leger, Louis (1889). A History of Austro-Hungary from the Earliest Time to the Year 1889. Translated by A. B. Hill. G. P. Putnam's Sons.
- Libbey, Theodore (2006). The NPR Listener's Encyclopedia of Classical Music. Workman Publishing.
- Lieber, Francis; E. Wigglesworth; T. G. Bradford (1832). Encyclopædia Americana. Philadelphia.
- MacKey, Albert G.; Haywood, Harry LeRoy (1909). Encyclopedia of Freemasonry 1909.
- Mathews, William Smythe Babcock; Liebling, Emil (1896). Pronouncing and Defining Dictionary of Music. Cincinnati: The John. Church Company.
- Mersmann, Hans, ed. (1972). Letters of Wolfgang Amadeus Mozart. Dover Publications. ISBN 9780486228594.
- Roman, Eric (2009). Austria-Hungary and the Successor States: A Reference Guide from the Renaissance to the Present. Infobase Publishing.
- Rushton, Julian (2006). Mozart. The Master Musicians Series. Oxford: Oxford University Press.
- Sadie, Stanley (2006). Mozart: The Early Years 1756–1781. Oxford: Oxford University Press.
- Slonimsky, Nicolas, ed. (1984). Baker's Biographical Dictionary of Musicians (7th ed.). New York: Schirmer Books.
- —, ed. (1992). Baker's Biographical Dictionary of Musicians (8th ed.). New York: Schirmer Books.
- Solomon, Maynard (1995). Mozart: A Life. New York: Harper Collins.
