= Lebanon–Morocco relations =

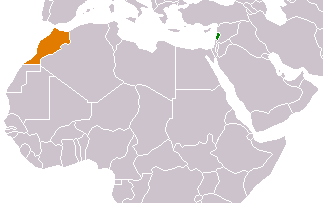
- Lebanon: Morocco

Diplomatic mission
- Embassy of Lebanon, Rabat: Embassy of Morocco, Beirut

Lebanon–Morocco relations (Arabic: العلاقات المغربية اللبنانية) refers to bilateral relations between Lebanon and Morocco.

== History ==
Bilateral relations began after both countries gained their respective independence, with Lebanon in 1943 and Morocco in 1956. Diplomatic relations were established in 1956 between the two countries, and they have remained relatively friendly as both are part of the Arab world.

In the 1980s, Morocco helped negotiate the Taif Agreement that brought an end to the Lebanese civil war. Conversely, Lebanon has also reaffirmed its support for Moroccan territorial sovereignty, especially in the Western Sahara conflict, and both countries continued to have positive relations.

== Cultural relations ==
Both Lebanon and Morocco have strong ties in Arab culture, and they have frequent exchanges through cultural events, including in art and tradition. Both countries also offer student scholarships for academic exchanges in each other's universities.

== Resident diplomatic missions ==
- Lebanon has an embassy in Rabat.
- Morocco has an embassy in Beirut.

== See also ==
- Foreign relations of Lebanon
- Foreign relations of Morocco
