= Bölzlschiessen =

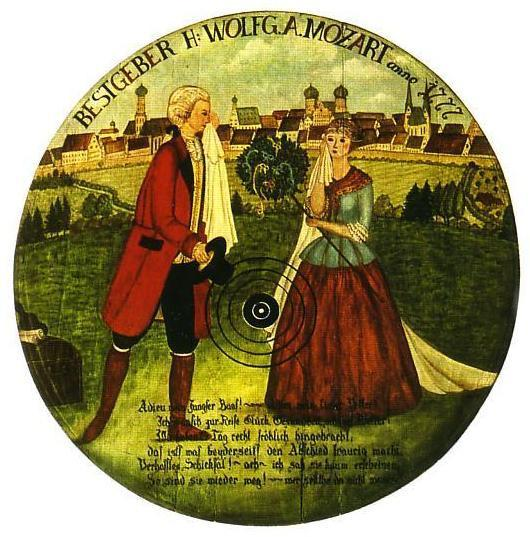
Modern reconstruction of a Bölzlschiessen target. It pokes fun at Wolfgang Amadeus Mozart and his leavetaking with his cousin (and probable love interest) Maria Anna Thekla Mozart.

Bölzlschiessen was a form of domestic recreation that involved shooting darts at decorated targets with an air gun. It is remembered as an activity of Leopold Mozart, his family, and their friends. The most famous participant was Leopold's son Wolfgang Amadeus Mozart, who began playing at the age of ten or earlier.

== Description ==
There were normally about six to ten players. The Mozart family invited various friends, typically not colleagues from work. The role of Bestgeber ("best-giver") rotated among participants. The Bestgeber provided "a sum of money for the prizes, a painted target (German: Bölzlscheibe, "dart-target"), and possibly refreshments" (Halliwell). The target, which measured up to a meter in size, typically was satirical, poking fun at some member of the group, and included both a picture and some verse.

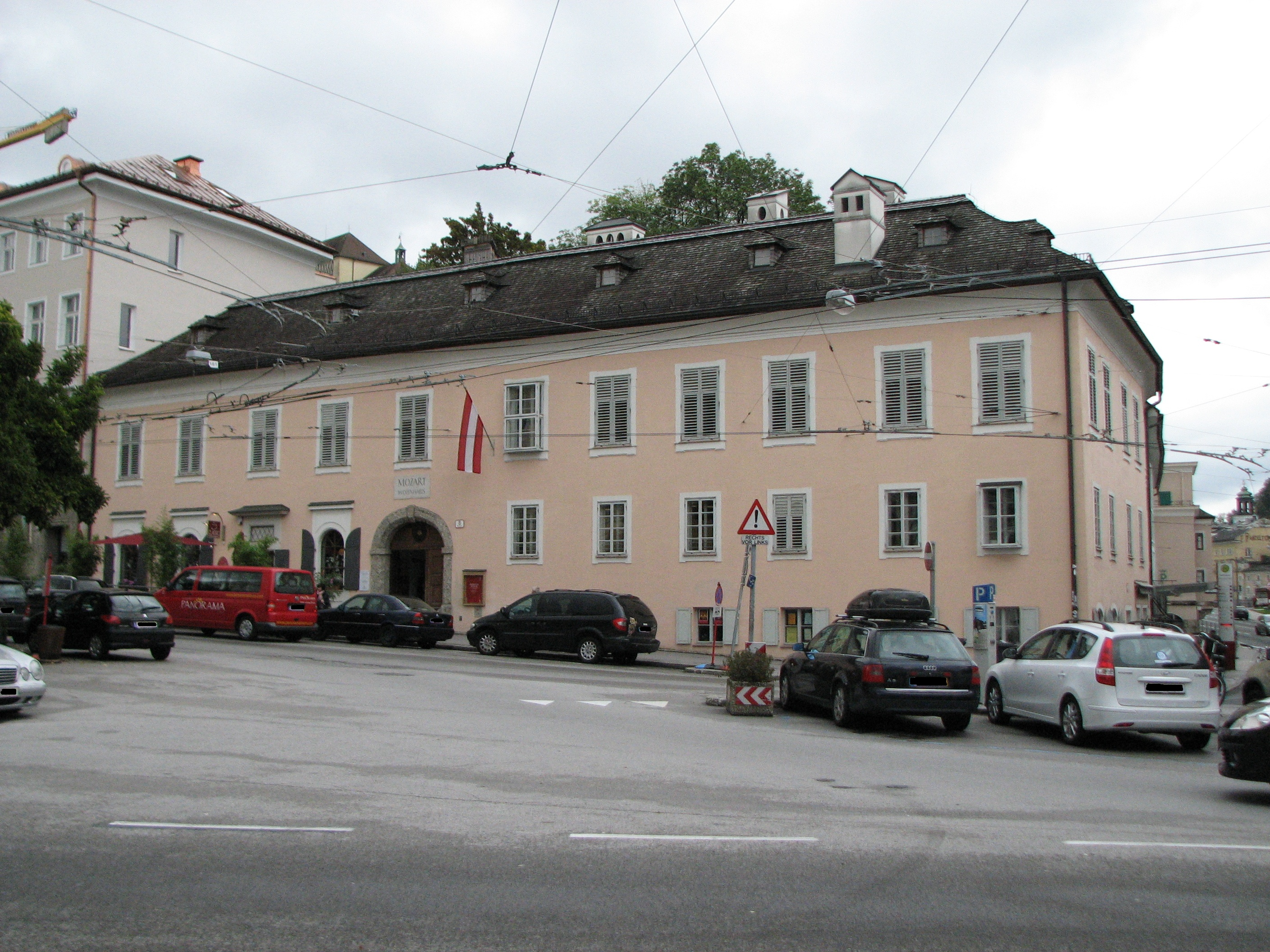
The Tanzmeisterhaus in Salzburg. The building currently houses a Mozart museum.

When the Mozart family were the hosts, the game was usually played indoors. From 1773 they lived in the Tanzmeisterhaus ("Dancing Master's House"), where their apartments included the studio of the dancing master who had lived there. They used this large room for concerts, dancing, and also Bölzlschiessen. Gatherings took place on Sundays and holidays after lunch. The shooting was followed by card games and a stroll in the Mirabell Park.

The game seems to have been part of the Mozarts' identity as a family: when Wolfgang and his mother left Salzburg in 1777 for his lengthy (and unsuccessful) job-hunting tour, others took their turns at Bölzlschiessen back home in Salzburg. At one point, Wolfgang wrote home to Leopold, specifying the form of a Bölzlschiessen target he wanted used (see below).

The close-knit Mozart family was eventually broken up by death and migration: the mother Anna Maria Mozart died in Paris in 1778 while visiting there with Wolfgang, who in turn departed to Vienna in 1781 to pursue his career. The daughter Maria Anna Mozart ("Nannerl") left Salzburg in 1784 to live with her new husband in St. Gilgen, six hours away. This left Leopold alone as the last remaining family member living in the Tanzmeisterhaus. Leopold died in 1787, and the list of sale items for the auction that followed poignantly included several dart guns.

== Specific Bölzlschiessen targets ==
=== Wolfgang Amadeus Mozart and Maria Anna Thekla Mozart ===
See image above. Wolfgang's departure from his cousin (and possible love interest) Maria Anna Thekla Mozart was from Augsburg where she lived; he was heading toward Mannheim on his job-hunting tour. The target was commissioned for Wolfgang by his father Leopold; evidently Wolfgang served as honorary Bestgeber despite being away from home.

The verse on the target reads (in English):

Adieu, my maiden cousin! – Adieu, my cousin!
I wish you good luck on the journey, health, fine weather
We spent a fortnight together quite gaily,
'Tis this that makes parting so sad for us twain.
Hateful fate! – Alas – scarcely did I see you arrive
When you are off again! Who would not weep at this?

=== Katherl Gilowsky ===
A friend of Mozart's older sister Nannerl. Several targets portray her in various ways forlornly seeking a husband. On one target, the poem read as follows (verse translation by Halliwell):

At every pious pilgrim church to which I wend my way
I carry something from my hopes for which alone I pray;
Will heaven not alas relent to hear a poor soul's plea?
And for my sacrifice and prayer bestow a man on me?

Another commemorates an event in which she tripped on a step in a local store, exposing her posterior in public. Yet another celebrates her birthday by depicting her in a cradle as Leopold's violin pupil, the castrato Francesco Ceccarelli, plays her a lullaby. Ceccarelli was Bestgeber on this occasion.

=== Emanuel Schikaneder ===
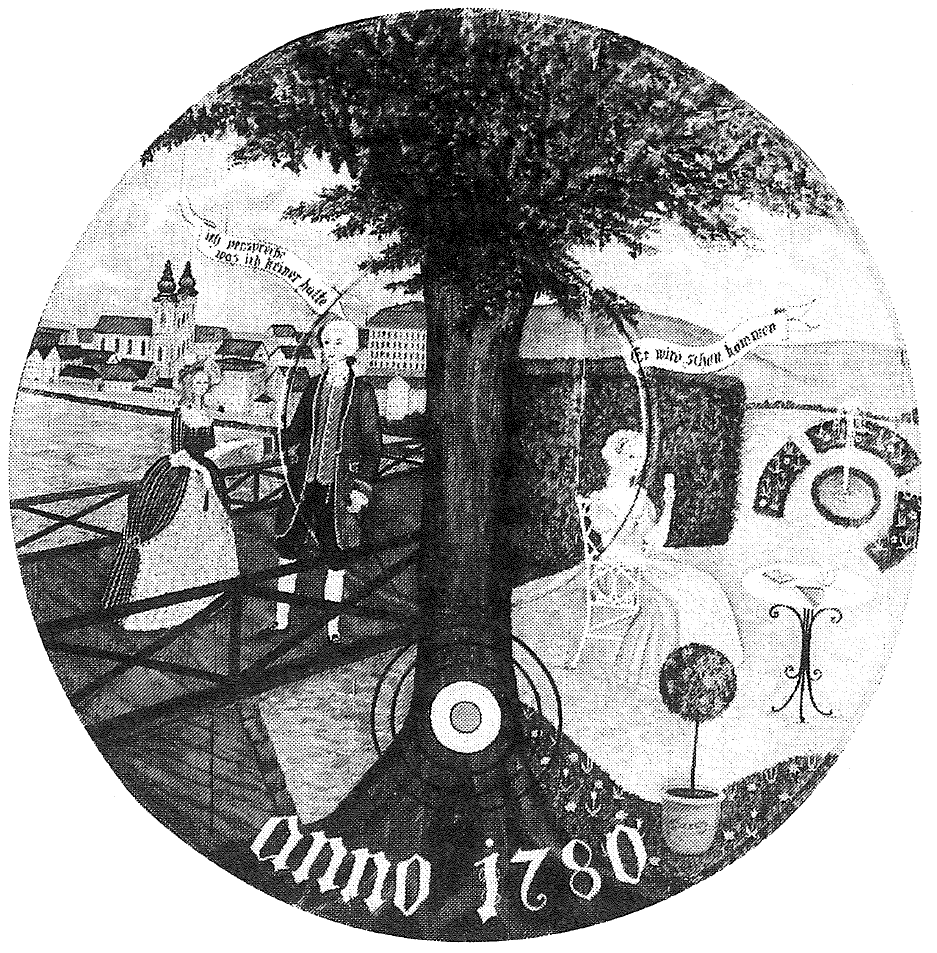
Modern reconstruction of the Bölzlschiessen target satirizing Emanuel Schikaneder, from 1780. Captions: Schikaneder is shown as saying "ich verspreche was ich keiner halte" ("I promise what I cannot keep"), while the young woman on the right is shown saying "Er wird schon kommen" ("He will soon come to me").

Schikaneder is known to history as the librettist and impresario of Mozart's opera The Magic Flute, written in 1791. In 1780, he had brought his theatrical trouple to Salzburg for an extended stay, and during this time befriended the Mozart family. He is recorded as participating in Bölzlschiessen with them, and the target that portrayed him was based on his reputation as a womanizer. According to Schroeder it shows him "trifling with one woman while another waits patiently for him to come to her."

=== Wolfgang's commission ===
While away on his job hunting trip, Wolfgang wrote to his father specifying the form of Bölzlschiessen target he would like the family to use during his absence.

Concerning the targets, if it is not too late, please do this for me. A small man with light hair, stooped over, revealing his bare arse. From his mouth come the words, good appetite for the feast. The other man should be shown with boots and spurs, a red cloak and a splendid, fashionable wig. He must be of medium height and depicted in a pose wherein he licks the other man's arse. From his mouth come the words: oh, there's nothing to top that. So, please, if it can't be this time, another time.

Schroeder suggests that one of the men portrayed may have been the Mozarts' employer, Archbishop Colloredo. Halliwell hypothesizes that it was Jakob Alois Karl Langenmantel, a functionary in Augsburg who had mocked Mozart for wearing his emblem of knighthood from the Pope (the Order of the Golden Spur; see Mozart and Catholicism).

The action Mozart describes in his letter also is mentioned in his letters to Maria Anna Thekla Mozart and in his musical canons; for discussion, see Mozart and scatology.

== Etymology and spelling ==
In German, Bolzen means "bolt", as in the sense of "crossbow bolt". -l is a diminutive suffix, which induces an Umlaut on its stem; hence Bölzl "little bolt, dart". Schiessen means "to shoot" or "shooting".

In German usage the word is most often spelled Bölzlschießen, using an Eszett; English-language sources normally use ss instead.
