= Mozart and the Catholic Church =

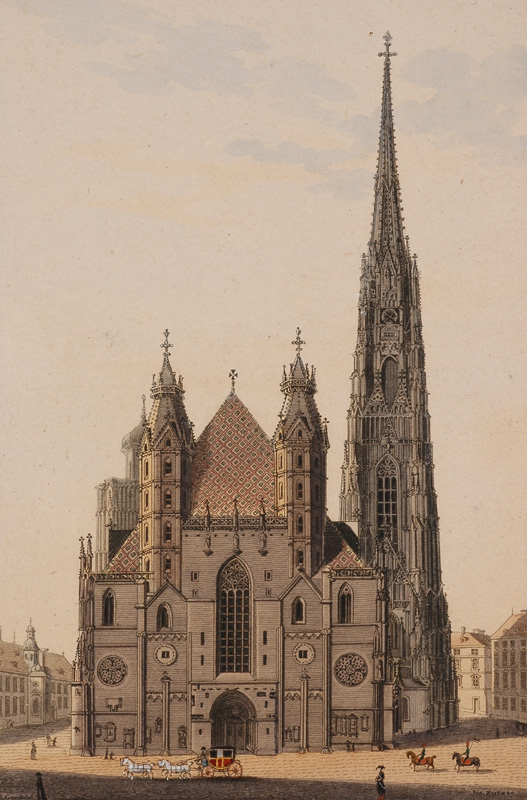
St. Stephen's Cathedral, Vienna, the most important edifice of the Roman Catholic Church in Vienna. Mozart's marriage and funeral took place here.

The composer Wolfgang Amadeus Mozart was a Catholic, and the Church played an important role in his life.

== Life ==
=== Catholic upbringing ===
Mozart's parents (Leopold Mozart and Anna Maria Mozart) were Catholics and raised their children religiously, insisting upon strict obedience to the requirements of the Church. They encouraged family prayer, fasting, the veneration of saints, regular attendance at mass, and frequent confession.

Leopold Mozart continued to urge strict observance upon Wolfgang even when the latter had entered adulthood. In 1777, he wrote to his wife and son, who at the time were on their journey to Paris:

Is it necessary for me to ask whether Wolfgang is not perhaps getting a little lax about confession? God must come first! From His hands we receive our temporal happiness; and at the same time we must think of our eternal salvation. Young people do not like to hear about these things, I know, for I was once young myself. But, thank God, in spite of all my youthful foolish pranks, I always pulled myself together. I avoid all dangers to my soul and ever kept God and my honor and the consequences, the very dangerous consequences, before my eyes.

By "very dangerous consequences", Leopold was most probably referring to a specific doctrine of Catholicism, namely that persons who die in a state of mortal sin will experience eternal punishment in hell.

Leopold extended another important element of Catholic belief—the existence of earthly miracles as signs from God—to the case of his son, whose abilities he considered to have a divine origin. In 1768, he wrote to his friend Lorenz Hagenauer, describing his son as

a miracle, which God has allowed to see the light in Salzburg. ...And if it is ever to be my duty to convince the world of this miracle, it is so now, when people are ridiculing whatever is called a miracle and denying all miracles. ...But because this miracle is too evident and consequently not to be denied, they want to suppress it. They refuse to let God have the honor.

=== Order of the Golden Spur ===
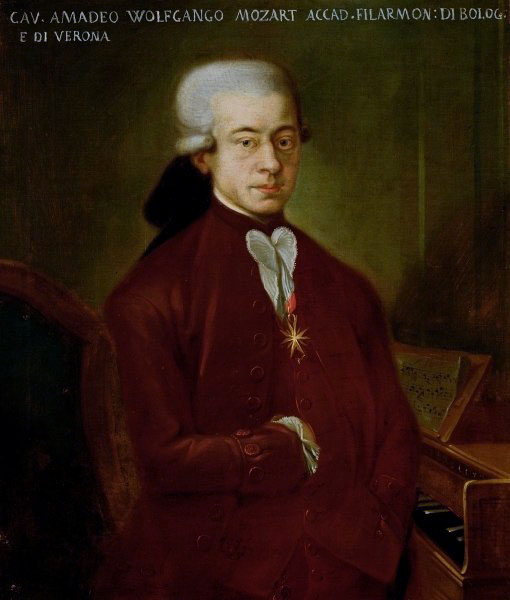
Mozart wearing the insignia of the Order of the Golden Spur. Copy, dated 1777, of an older painting dating from his Italian journey

As a teenager, Mozart went on tours of Italy, accompanied by his father. During the first of these, Leopold and Wolfgang visited Rome (1770), where Wolfgang was awarded the Order of the Golden Spur, a form of honorary knighthood, by Pope Clement XIV. The papal patent for the award said:

Inasmuch as it behoves the beneficence of the Roman Pontiff and the Apostolic See that those who have shown them no small signs of faith and devotion and are graced with the merits of probity and virtue, shall be decorated with the honours and favors of the Roman Pontiff and the said See. (4 July 1770)

The following day Mozart received his official insignia, consisting of "a golden cross on a red sash, sword, and spurs," emblematic of honorary knighthood. The papal patent also absolved the awardee from any previous sentence of excommunication (unnecessary in Mozart's case) and stated "it is our wish that thou shalt at all times wear the Golden Cross." In the 1777 painting (shown here) known as the "Bologna Mozart", Mozart is indeed shown wearing his knightly insignia.

Mozart's Golden Spur decoration was the source of an unpleasant incident in October 1777, when he visited Augsburg during the job-hunting tour (1777–1779) that ultimately took him to Paris. Following the advice of his father, Mozart wore his insignia in public, and in particular to a dinner arranged by a young aristocrat named Jakob Alois Karl Langenmantel. Langenmantel and his brother-in-law teased Mozart mercilessly about the insignia, and Mozart ultimately was moved to reply very sharply and eventually depart. Thenceforth Mozart showed considerably more caution in wearing his decoration.

=== Marriage ===
Matrimony is a sacrament of the Catholic Church, and Mozart was wed in a Church ceremony. His bride was Constanze Weber; the two were married on 4 August 1782 in a side chapel of St. Stephen's Cathedral in Vienna where they lived.

=== Freemasonry ===
Mozart joined the Freemasons in 1784, and remained an active member until his death. His choice to enter the lodge "Zur Wohltätigkeit" was influenced by his friendship with the lodge's master, Baron Otto Heinrich von Gemmingen-Hornberg, and his attraction to the lodge's "shared devotion to Catholic tradition." Nor was Mozart's Masonic commitment the most likely source of his occasional anti-clerical statements, and even less indicative of any essential antipathy to Catholicism. Such anti-clericalism is much more easily attributed to the fashionable anti-clericalism of Febronian Catholicism favored by those in power in Mozart's social ambit at this period, which still reflected a very conservative Counter-Reformation aesthetic environment.

Freemasonry was banned by the Catholic Church in a papal bull entitled In eminenti apostolatus issued by Pope Clement XII on 28 April 1738. The ban, however, "was published and came into force only in the Papal States, Spain, Portugal, and Poland." It was not promulgated in Austria, where Mozart lived, until 1792 (after Mozart's death). Hence, although the Catholic Church's opposition to Freemasonry would eventually become known in Austria, during Mozart's lifetime "a good Catholic could perfectly well become a Mason," and it is clear that Mozart saw no conflict between these two allegiances.

=== Last rites ===
There is conflicting evidence concerning whether Mozart received last rites of the Catholic Church on his death bed. In 1825, 33 years after Mozart's death, Mozart's sister-in-law Sophie Haibel prepared a brief memoir of Mozart's death for her brother-in-law Georg Nikolaus von Nissen, the second husband of Mozart's widow Constanze, who with Constanze's help was then preparing a Mozart biography. Sophie wrote:

My poor sister came after me and begged me for heavens' sake to go to the priests at St Peter's and ask [one of] the priests to come, as if on a chance visit. That I also did, though the priests hesitated a long time and I had great difficulty in persuading one of these inhuman priests to do it.

Further annotations were written on Sophie's letter. One of them, in Nissen's hand, says, "The priests declined to come because the sick person himself did not send for them." According to Halliwell, "A later annotation states that although Mozart did not receive the last rites (presumably absolution and Holy Communion), he was given extreme unction. Thus there is confusion about which, if any, of the sacraments for the sick and dying Mozart received." Gutman claims that Mozart was incapable of receiving any last rites other than extreme unction because he was unconscious at the time. While it is unclear whether Mozart received last rites on his deathbed, there is no evidence suggesting that he actually refused them.

=== Funeral ===
Mozart received a Catholic funeral service at St. Stephen's Cathedral and was given exequies at a requiem mass in St. Michael's Church.

== Liturgical works ==
During his lifetime, Mozart composed more than 60 pieces of sacred music. The majority were written between 1773 and 1781, when he was employed as court musician to the Prince-Archbishop of Salzburg. Important later liturgical works included the Mass in C minor (K. 427), written for the Salzburg visit of 1783, the motet Ave verum corpus (K. 618), written in Baden in 1791, and the Requiem mass (K. 626), left incomplete at Mozart's death.

Research on paper types by Alan Tyson suggests that a number of works long thought to be Salzburg material actually may date from Mozart's late Vienna years. As Tyson notes, this would make sense since Mozart was at the time engaged in a (successful) campaign to be appointed as the designated successor to Leopold Hofmann in the Kapellmeister position at St. Stephen's Cathedral.

== Notes ==
=== Sources ===
- Deutsch, Otto Erich (1965). Mozart: A Documentary Biography. Stanford: Stanford University Press.
- Eisen, Cliff; Keefe, Simon P. (2006). The Cambridge Mozart Encyclopedia. Cambridge University Press.
- Fahlbusch, Erwin (2003) The Encyclopedia of Christianity, Eerdmans Publishing Company.
- Halliwell, Ruth. "Haibel, Sophie". In Eisen & Keefe (2006), pp. 206–207.
- Heartz, Daniel (2009) Mozart, Haydn and Early Beethoven, 1781–1802. New York: W. W. Norton & Company.
- Melograni, Piero (2006) Wolfgang Amadeus Mozart. Chicago: University of Chicago Press.
- Schroeder, David P. (1999) Mozart in Revolt. New Haven: Yale University Press.
- Solomon, Maynard (1995). Mozart: A Life. New York: Harper Collins.
- Tyson, Alan (1987) Mozart: Studies of the Autograph Scores. Cambridge: Harvard University Press.
