= Barbara Krafft =

Austrian artist (1764–1825)

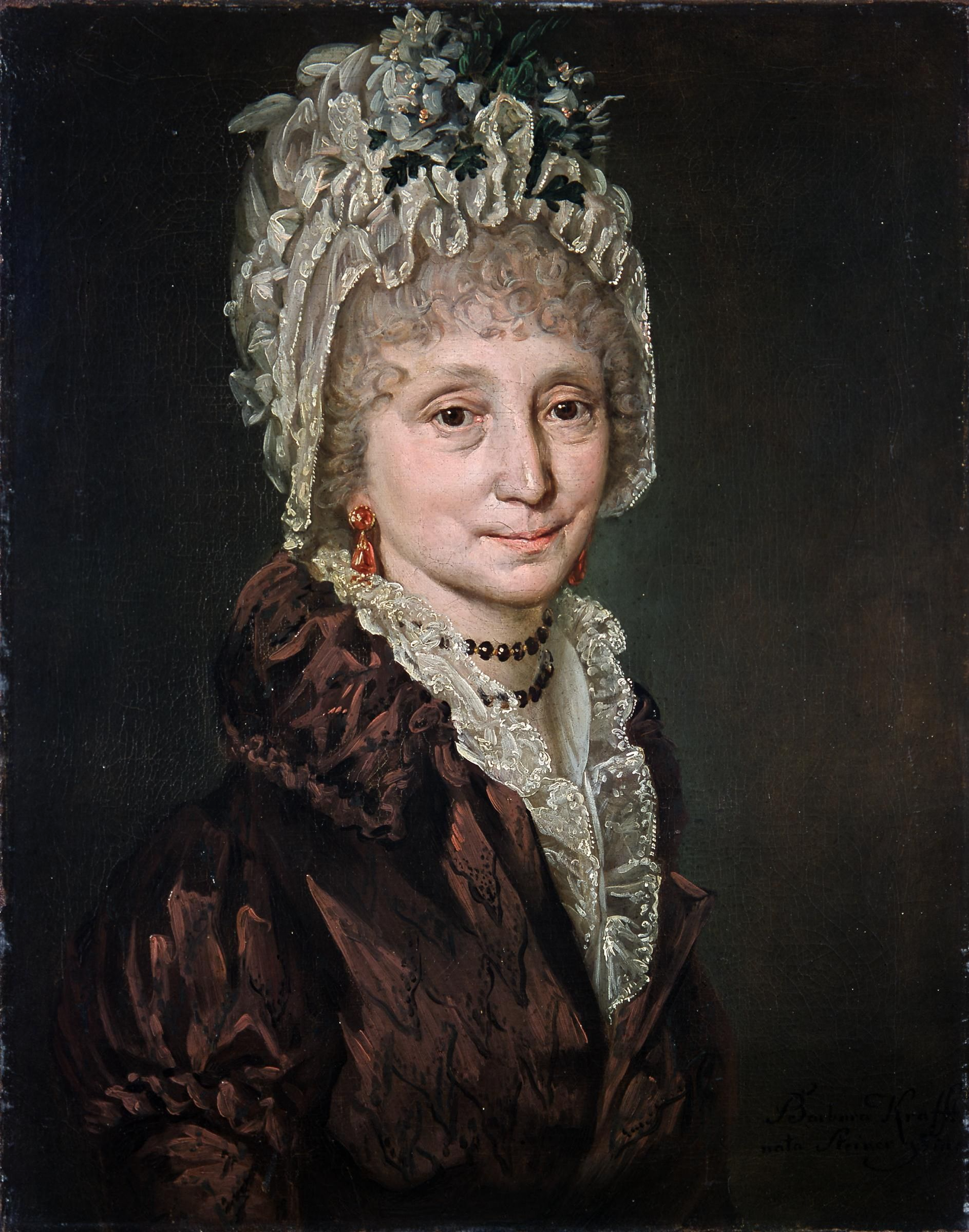
- Born: Maria Barbara Steiner; 1 April 1764; Iglau, Margraviate of Moravia
- Died: 28 September 1825 (aged 61); Bamberg, Kingdom of Bavaria
- Occupation: painter

Maria Barbara Krafft (née Steiner; 1 April 1764 – 28 September 1825) was a Moravian-born Austrian painter, best remembered today for her widely reproduced posthumous portrait of Wolfgang Amadeus Mozart.

== Life and career ==
She was born in Iglau (now Jihlava, in the Czech Republic) where her father, the Austrian Imperial court painter Johann Nepomuk Steiner, was working at the time. She was taught painting by her father and accompanied him to Vienna, where she exhibited her first painting in 1786 at the Academy of Fine Arts.

In 1789 she married the Viennese pharmacist Josef Krafft. Their son Johann August Krafft, born in 1792 and taught by his mother, later became a painter and lithographer. For various periods between 1794 and 1803 Krafft worked and travelled alone in Jihlava, Salzburg, and Prague, achieving increasing success primarily as a portrait painter, but also producing genre and religious works. By 1804 she was separated from her husband and settled in Salzburg where she lived until 1821. In the last four years of her life, she was the appointed City Painter in Bamberg where she painted 145 paintings. She died at the age of 61.

== Gallery ==
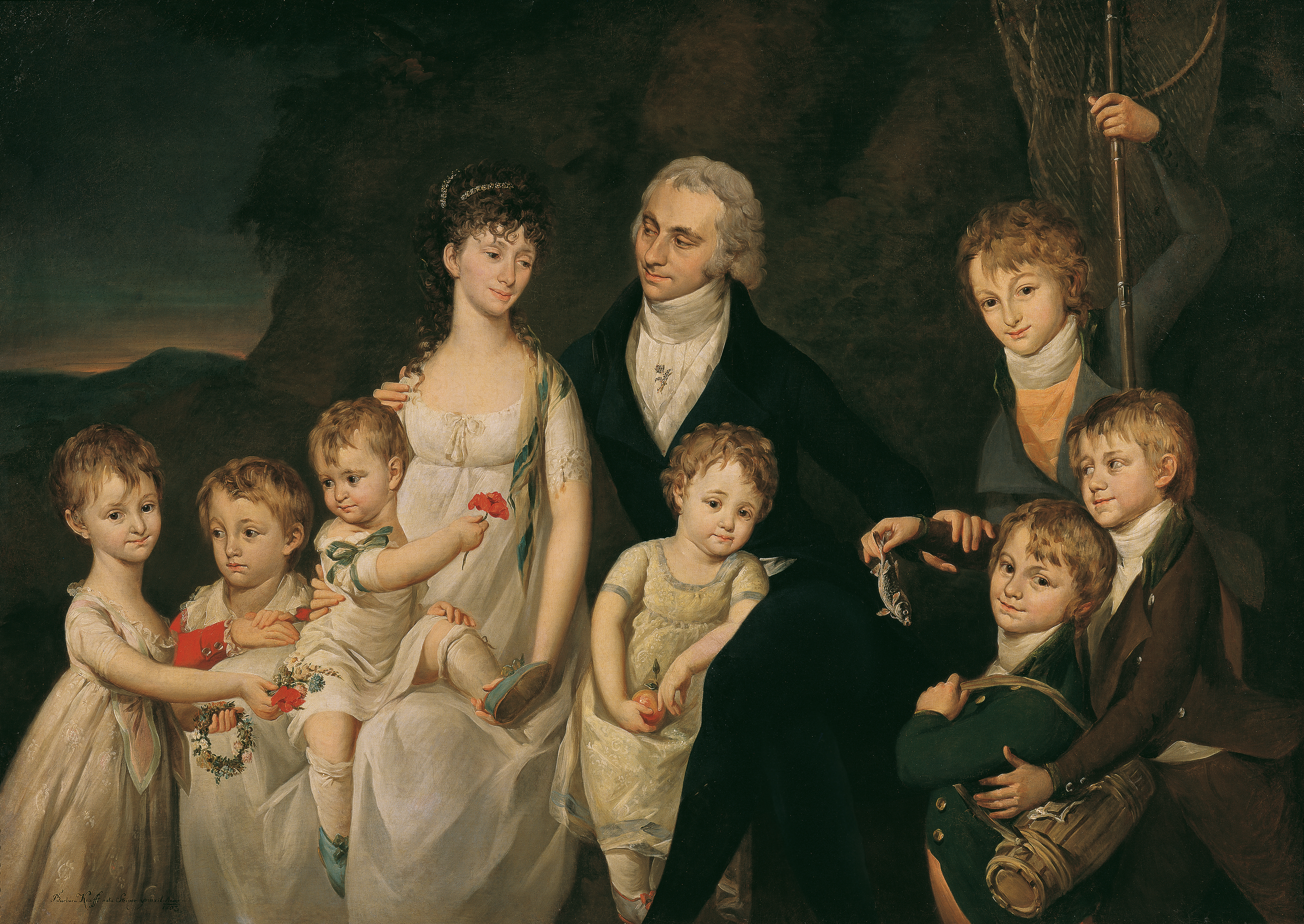
The Family Anton von Marx (Vienna, Austrian Gallery Belvedere), 1803.

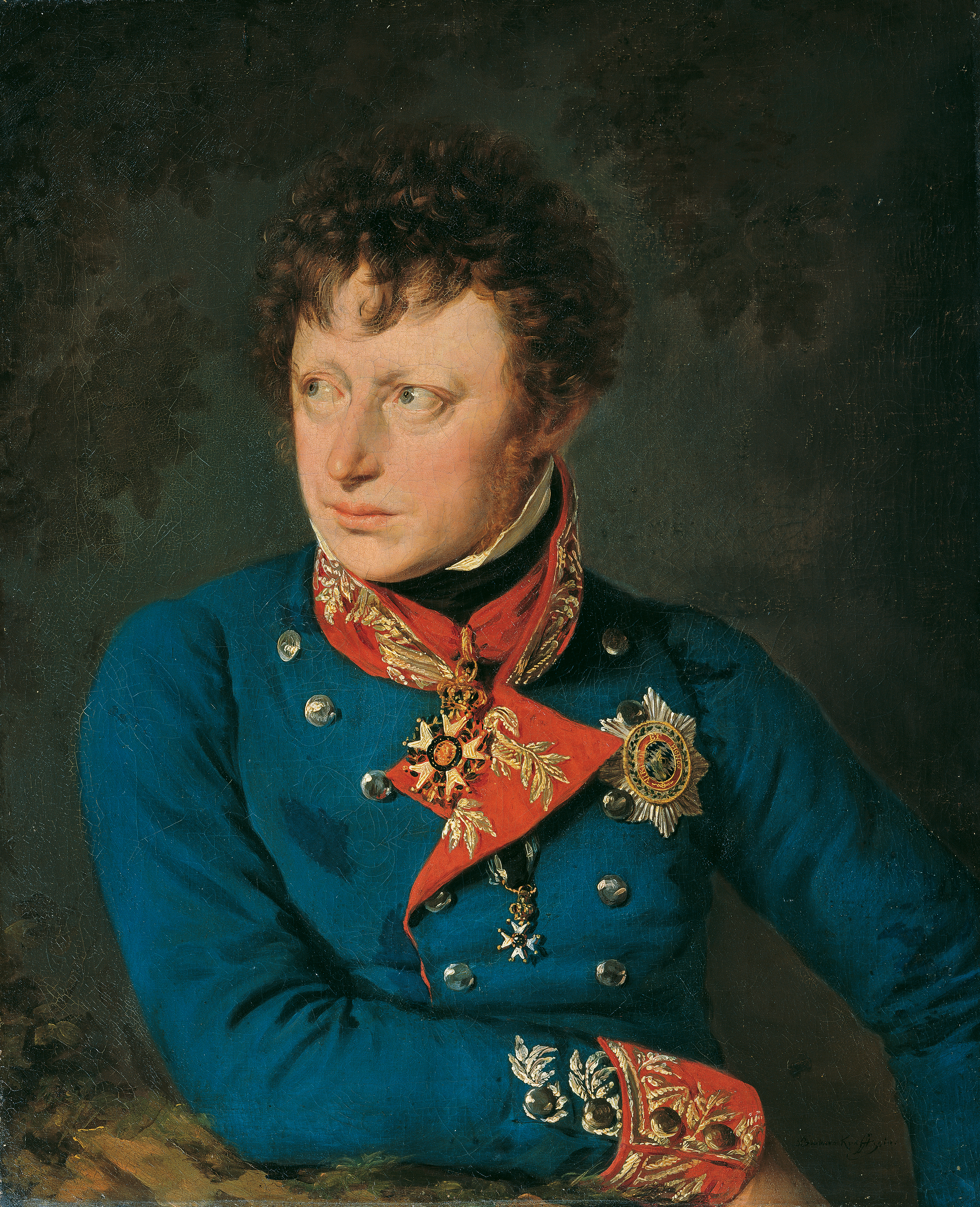
The Bavarian Lieutenant General Clemens von Raglovich (Vienna, Austrian Gallery, Inv. No. 1642), around 1813.

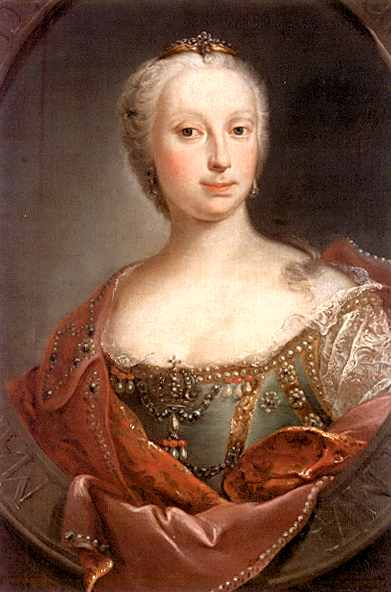
Portrait of Maria Theresa.

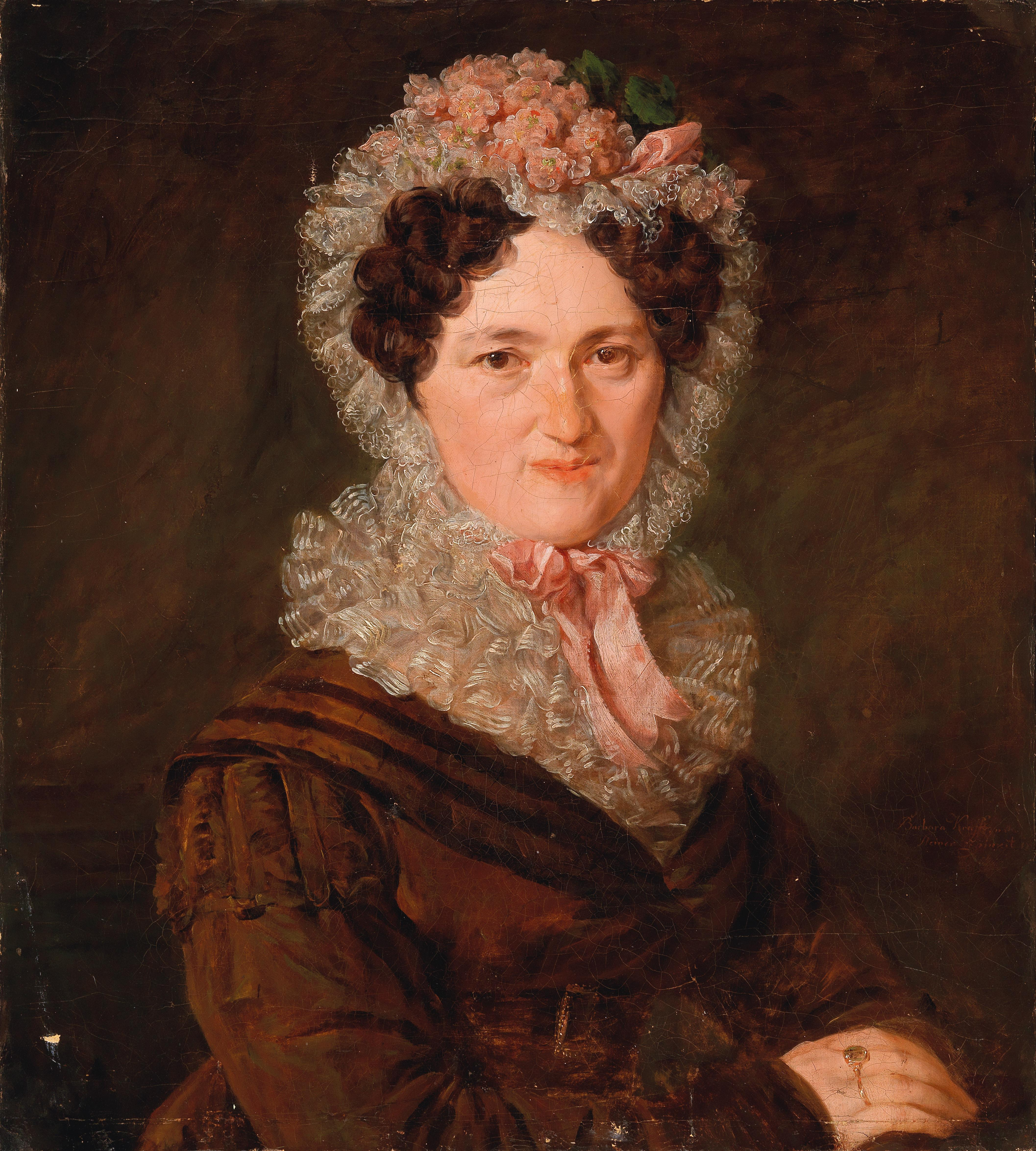
Portrait of a Woman with Mob Cap, 1822.

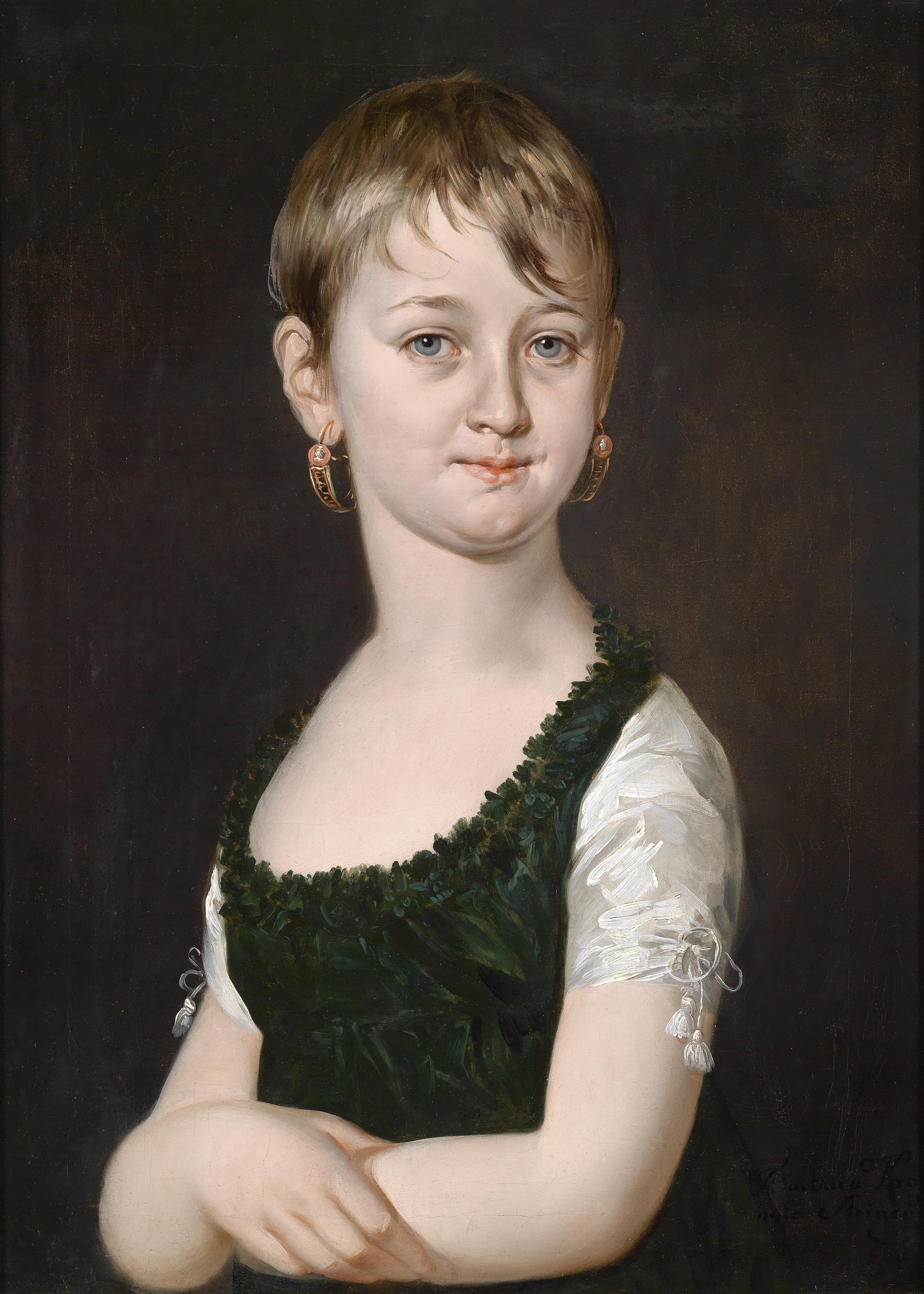
Portrait of a young girl, c. 1825.

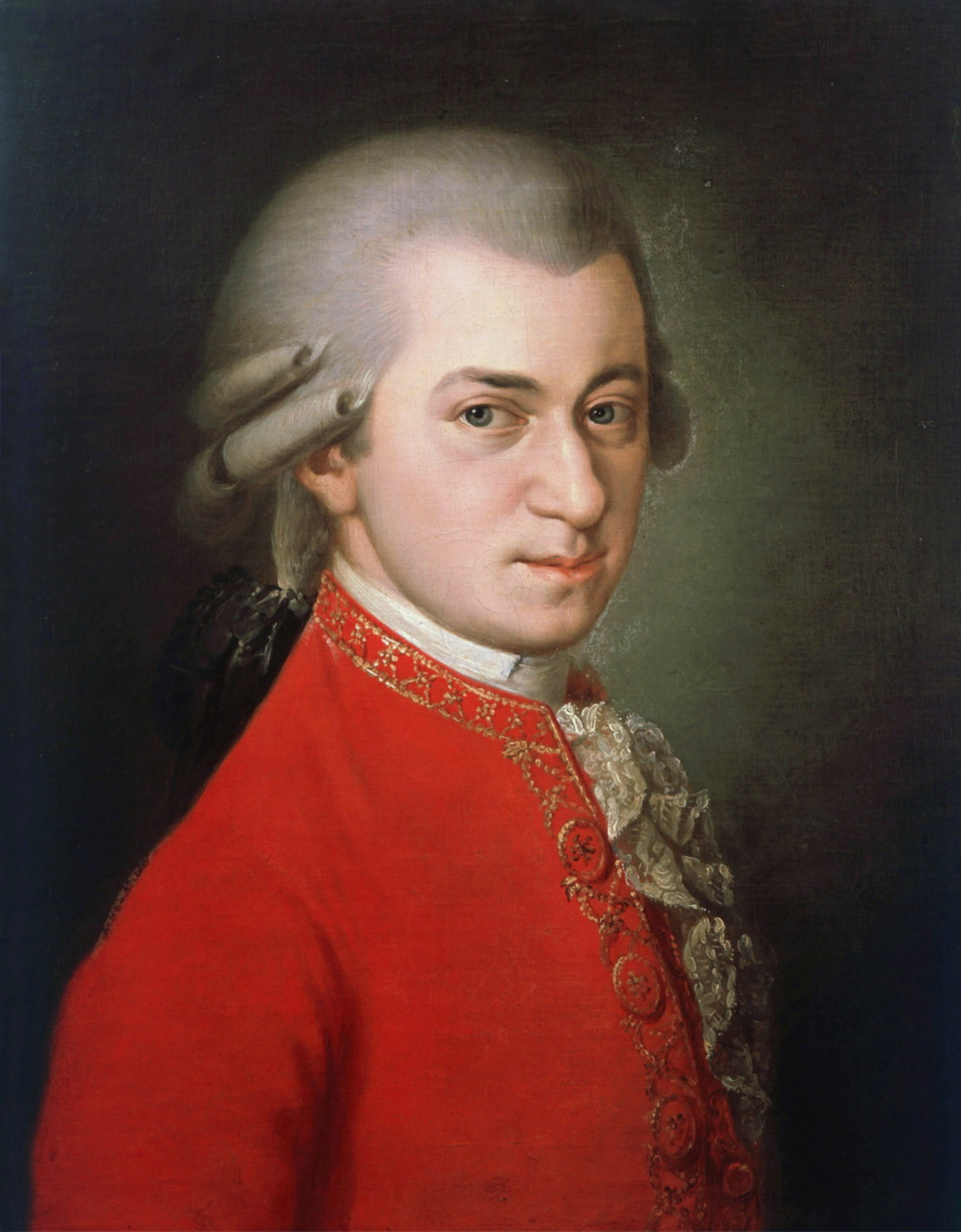
Wolfgang Amadeus Mozart, posthumous 1819
