= Landeshoheit =

Territorial sovereignty

In the Holy Roman Empire, Landeshoheit (Note: German, also Landesherrschaft or Obrigkeit) (German pronunciation: [ˈlandəsˌhoːhaɪt]) or superioritas territorialis (Note: Latin, sometimes ius territoriale) (translated as territorial superiority, territorial supremacy or territorial sovereignty) was the authority possessed by the immediate lords within their own territories. It was possessed by all imperial estates and imperial knights. It has often been conflated with the concept of sovereignty, but, while it "carried with it nearly all the ingredients or attributes of true sovereignty, [it] was legally distinct from it, and was everywhere in Germany admitted to be so."

The Peace of Westphalia has frequently been portrayed as conferring full sovereignty on at least the imperial princes. In fact, the princes' powers were not expanded, but the right of their aristocratic subjects (mediate lords) to maintain military forces was removed. The princes' rights to make treaties and to enter into alliances and thus to engage in foreign relations was not affected but remained "constrained by the obligation not to harm the emperor or Empire". Their authority in their own territories remained "circumscribed by imperial law and by the emperor's formal position as their feudal overlord".

Landeshoheit was unique to the Empire, where the relationship between the crown and its vassals evolved in a direction opposite that of other European monarchies. "Whereas in most other European states, [the precursor of modern statehood] evolved on the central governmental level and on the basis of the monarchical sphere of authority", in the Empire hallmarks of modern statehood appeared first among the imperial estates.

Although the fiefs that were part of the Kingdom of Italy had no representation in the imperial diet, and did therefore not constitute imperial estates, some of them possessed Landeshoheit. The two primary examples of this are the Langhe fiefs, ruled by the Duke of Savoy, and the fiefs held by the Malaspina family.

== Works cited ==
- Gagliardo, John G. (1980). Reich and Nation: The Holy Roman Empire as Idea and Reality, 1763–1806. Bloomington, IN: Indiana University Press.
- Renault, Rachel (2014). "Landeshoheit". «Les mots du Saint-Empire» – un glossaire.
- Simon, Thomas (2015). "Territorial sovereignty (Holy Roman Empire)". In Graeme Dunphy; Andrew Gow (eds.). Encyclopedia of Early Modern History Online. doi:10.1163/2352-0272_emho_COM_023031.
- Walker, Mack (1980). Johann Jacob Moser and the Holy Roman Empire of the German Nation. University of North Carolina Press.
- Wilson, Peter H. (2016). Heart of Europe: A History of the Holy Roman Empire. Cambridge, MA: Belknap Press.
