= Cliff Eisen =

Canadian musicologist (born 1952)

Cliff Eisen (born 21 January 1952 in Toronto) is a Canadian musicologist and Mozart expert. He was based in the Department of Music at King's College London. He studied at the University of Toronto and at Cornell University, and has taught at the University of Western Ontario and New York University.

His research focuses on the Classical period, particularly Mozart and performance practice. He has written extensively on the issues of authenticity surrounding the works of Leopold Mozart and his son, Wolfgang. Other publications of his deal with Mozart's chamber music, life in Salzburg, biography and his life in contemporary documentation, as well as Cole Porter.

In 1997, Eisen was terminated by New York University after a student filed a lawsuit against the university alleging sexual harassment. The university had previously reprimanded him after complaints from four other students.
