= List of concert arias, songs and canons by Wolfgang Amadeus Mozart =

This is a list of concert arias, songs and canons by Wolfgang Amadeus Mozart.

== Concert arias ==
=== Soprano ===
K^{1}	K^{6}	Composition, score and critical report (NMA)	Librettist	Date
23		"Conservati fedele" (Score/Crit. report); Aria for soprano and orchestra	Metastasio, Artaserse I,1	October 1765
70	61c	"A Berenice ... Sol nascente" (Score/Crit. report); Recitative and aria (Licenza) for soprano and orchestra	unknown	28 February 1767 or 1769
	74b	"Non curo l'affetto" (Score/Crit. report); Aria for soprano and orchestra	Metastasio, Demofoonte I,7	early 1771
77	73e	"Misero me! ... Misero pargoletto" (Score/Crit. report); Recitative and aria for soprano and orchestra	Metastasio, Demofoonte III, 4&5	12 March 1770
78	73b	"Per pietà, bell'idol mio" (Score/Crit. report); Aria for soprano and orchestra	Metastasio, Artaserse I,5	1766, or Count Firmian's audition party, Milan, 12 March 1770
79	73d	"O temerario Arbace! ... Per quel paterno amplesso" (Score/Crit. report); Recitative and aria for soprano and orchestra	Metastasio, Artaserse II,11	1766, or Count Firmian's audition party, Milan, 12 March 1770
deest KV^{9} 646		"Cara, se le mie pene" (Score/Crit. report); Aria for soprano and orchestra	unknown	1769
82	73o	"Se ardire, e speranza" (Score/Crit. report); Aria for soprano and orchestra	Metastasio, Demofoonte, I, 13	25 April 1770
83	73p	"Se tutti i mali miei" (Score/Crit. report); Aria for soprano and orchestra	Metastasio; Demofoonte, II, 6	1770
88	73c	"Fra cento affanni e cento" (Score/Crit. report); Aria for soprano and orchestra	Metastasio, Artaserse, I,2	1770
119	382h	"Der Liebe himmlisches Gefühl" (Score/Crit. report); Aria for soprano and orchestra (piano reduction); This is possibly (Kunze) the aria for Gretl Marchand from K. deest	unknown	1782
146	317b	"Kommet her, ihr frechen Sünder"; Aria for soprano and strings	unknown	between March and April 1779
152	210a	"Ridente la calma" (Score/Crit. report); Aria for voice and piano, transcription of an aria that originally appeared in Josef Mysliveček's Armida (1780) as sung by Luigi Marchesi. The text "Ridente la calma" comes from the text of another aria sung by Marchesi, in this case in Francesco Bianchi's Il trionfo della pace (1782). Mozart used the music from Mysliveček's opera and the text from Bianchi's opera probably when Marchesi and Mozart were both present in Vienna in 1785.	Cesare Oliveri, Il trionfo della pace II, 12	ca. 1785
178	417e	"Ah, spiegarti, oh Dio" (Score/Crit. report); Aria for soprano and orchestra (piano reduction)	unknown	June 1783
217		"Voi avete un cor fedele" (Score/Crit. report); Aria for soprano and orchestra	Carlo Goldoni; Le nozze di Dorina I,4	26 October 1775
272		"Ah, lo previdi! ... Ah, t'invola ... Misera! ... Deh, non varcar" (Score/Crit. report); Recitative, aria, recitative and cavatina for soprano and orchestra	Vittorio Amedeo Cigna-Santi; Andromeda III,10	August 1777
294		"Alcandro, Io confesso ... Non sò d'onde viene" (Score/Crit. report); Recitative and aria for soprano and orchestra	Metastasio; L'Olimpiade III,6	24 February 1778
316	300b	"Popoli di Tessaglia! ... Io non chiedo, eterni Dei" (Score/Crit. report); Recitative and aria for soprano and orchestra	Ranieri de' Calzabigi; Alceste I,2	8 January 1779
	365a	"Zittre, töricht Herz"; Aria for soprano and orchestra (lost)	Friedrich August Clemens Werthes	November 1780
368		"Ma che vi fece, o stelle ... Sperai vicino il lido" (Score/Crit. report); Recitative and aria for soprano and orchestra	Metastasio; Demofoonte, I,4	January 1781
369		"Misera, dove son! ... Ah! non son io che parlo" (Score/Crit. report); Recitative and aria for soprano and orchestra	Metastasio; Ezio, III, 12	8 March 1781
374		"A questo seno deh vieni ... Or che il cielo a me ti rende" (Score/Crit. report); Recitative and aria for soprano and orchestra	Giovanni de Gamerra; Sismano nel Mogol III,7	April 1781
383		"Nehmt meinen Dank, ihr holden Gönner!" (Score/Crit. report); Aria for soprano and orchestra	unknown	10 April 1782
416		"Mia speranza adorata! ... Ah, non sai qual pena" (Score/Crit. report); Recitavo and aria (rondo) for soprano and orchestra	Gaetano Sertor; Zemira II,5	8 January 1783
418		"Vorrei spiegarvi, oh Dio!" (Score/Crit. report); Aria for soprano and orchestra	unknown	20 June 1783
419		"No, che non sei capace" (Score/Crit. report); Aria for soprano and orchestra	unknown	June 1783
440	383h	"In te spero, oh sposo amato" (Score/Crit. report); Aria for soprano and orchestra (sketch)	Metastasio; Demofoonte, I,2	February 1782
486a	295a	"Basta, vincesti ... Ah, non lasciarmi, no" (Score/Crit. report); Recitative and aria for soprano and orchestra	Metastasio; Didone abbandonata, II, 4	28 February 1778
505		"Ch'io mi scordi di te? ... Non temer, amato bene" (Score/Crit. report); Recitative and aria (rondo) for soprano, piano obbligato and orchestra	Giambattista Varesco	26 December 1786
528		"Bella mia fiamma, addio! ... Resta, oh cara!" (Score/Crit. report); Recitative and aria for soprano and orchestra	Michele Sarcone; Cerere placata II,5	3 November 1787
538		"Ah se in ciel, benigne stelle" (Score/Crit. report); Aria for soprano and orchestra	Metastasio; L'eroe cinese, I,2	4 March 1788
	540c	"In quali eccessi ... Mi tradì quell'alma ingrata" Replacement recitative and aria for the character Donna Elvira (soprano) and orchestra in Don Giovanni	Lorenzo Da Ponte	1788
569		"Ohne Zwang aus eignem Triebe"; Aria for soprano and orchestra (lost)	Michel-Jean Sedaine, Le roi et le fermier, tr. Johann Heinrich Faber	January 1789
577		"Al desio di chi t'adora" (Score); Replacement aria for the character Susanna (soprano) and orchestra in The Marriage of Figaro	Lorenzo Da Ponte	1789
578		"Alma grande e nobil core" (Score/Crit. report); Aria for soprano and orchestra	Giuseppe Palomba; I due baroni di Rocca Azzurra I,4	August 1789
579		"Un moto di gioia mi sento" (Score); Replacement aria for the character Susanna (soprano) and orchestra in The Marriage of Figaro	Lorenzo Da Ponte	1789
580		"Schon lacht der holde Frühling" (Score/Crit. report); Aria for soprano and orchestra (fragment)	unknown	17 September 1789
582		"Chi sà, chi sà, qual sia" (Score/Crit. report); Aria for soprano and orchestra	Lorenzo Da Ponte; Il burbero di buon cuore I,14	October 1789
583		"Vado, ma dove? oh Dei!" (Score/Crit. report); Aria for soprano and orchestra	Lorenzo Da Ponte; Il burbero di buon cuore II,4	October 1789

=== Contralto ===
K^{1}	K^{6}	Composition, score and critical report (NMA)	Librettist	Date
255		"Ombra felice! ... Io ti lascio" (Score/Crit. report); Recitative and aria (rondo) for contralto and orchestra	Giovanni de Gamerra; Arsace II,8	September 1776

=== Tenor ===
K^{1}	K^{6}	Composition, score and critical report (NMA)	Librettist	Date
21	19c	"Va, dal furor portata" (Score/Crit. report); Aria for tenor and orchestra	Metastasio; Ezio, II,4	1765
36	33i	"Or che il dover – Tali e cotanti sono" (Score/Crit. report); Recitative and aria for tenor and orchestra	unknown	December 1766
71		"Ah, più tremar non voglio" (Score/Crit. report); Aria for tenor and orchestra (fragment)	Metastasio; Demofoonte, I,1	1769 or 1770
209		"Si mostra la sorte" (Score/Crit. report); Aria for tenor and orchestra	unknown	19 May 1775
210		"Con ossequio, con rispetto" (Score/Crit. report); Aria for tenor and orchestra	unknown	May 1775
256		"Clarice cara mia sposa" (Score/Crit. report); Aria for tenor and orchestra	unknown	September 1776
295		"Se al labbro mio non credi" (Score/Crit. report); Aria for tenor and orchestra	Antonio Salvi; Artaserse, I,14	28 February 1778
420		"Per pietà, non ricercate" (Score/Crit. report); Aria (rondo) for tenor and orchestra	unknown	21 June 1783
431	425b	"Misero! O sogno ... Aura, che intorno spiri" (Score/Crit. report); Recitative and aria for tenor and orchestra	Caterino Mazzolà	December 1783
435	416b	"Müßt' ich auch durch tausend Drachen" (Score/Crit. report); Aria for tenor and orchestra (sketch)	unknown	1783
490		"Non più, tutto ascoltai... Non temer, amato bene" Replacement recitative and aria for the character Idamante (tenor) and orchestra in Idomeneo	Giambattista Varesco	1786
	540a	"Dalla sua pace" Replacement aria for the character Don Ottavio (tenor) and orchestra in Don Giovanni	Lorenzo Da Ponte	1788

=== Bass ===
K^{1}	K^{6}	Composition, score and critical report (NMA)	Librettist	Date
	209a	"Un dente guasto e gelato" (Score/Crit. report); Aria for bass and orchestra (fragment)	unknown	1775
432	421a	"Così dunque tradisci ... Aspri rimorsi atroci" (Score/Crit. report); Recitative and aria for bass and orchestra	Metastasio; Temistocle, III,8	1783
433	416c	"Männer suchen stets zu naschen" (Score/Crit. report); Aria for bass and orchestra (sketch)	unknown	1783
512		"Alcandro, Io confesso ... Non sò d'onde viene" (Score/Crit. report); Recitative and aria for bass and orchestra	Metastasio; L'Olimpiade III,6	18 or 19 March 1787
513		"Mentre ti lascio, oh figlia" (Score/Crit. report); Aria for bass and orchestra	Duca Sant'Angioli-Morbilli; La disfatta di Dario II,9	23 March 1787
539		"Ich möchte wohl der Kaiser sein" (Score/Crit. report); Aria for bass and orchestra	Johann Wilhelm Ludwig Gleim	5 March 1788
541		"Un bacio di mano" (Score/Crit. report); Arietta for bass and orchestra	Lorenzo Da Ponte; Le gelosie fortunate II,4	June 1788
584		"Rivolgete a lui lo sguardo" Aria for bass and orchestra, intended for Così fan tutte, but discarded at the first performance	Lorenzo Da Ponte	December 1789
612		"Per questa bella mano" (Score/Crit. report); Aria for bass, contrabass obbligato, and orchestra	unknown	8 March 1791
Anh. 245	621a	"Io ti lascio, oh cara, addio" (Score/Crit. report); Aria for bass and orchestra	unknown	1788

=== Group ===
K^{1}	K^{6}	Composition, score and critical report (NMA)	Librettist	Date
Anh. 24a	43a	"Ach, was müssen wir erfahren!" (Score); Duet for two sopranos (fragment)	unknown	15 October 1767
346	439a	"Luci care, luci belle" (Score); Notturno (terzet) for two sopranos, bass and three basset horns	Angelo Lungi, La Pupilla (some sources attribute libretto to Metastasio)	possibly 1783
389	384A	"Welch ängstliches Beben"; Duet for two tenors and orchestra, intended for Die Entführung aus dem Serail, but discarded at the first performance (fragment)	Christoph Friedrich Bretzner	between April and May 1782
434	480b	"Del gran regno delle amazzoni" (Score/Crit. report); Aria for tenor, two basses and orchestra (fragment)	Giuseppe Petrosellini; Il regno delle amazzoni I,1	end of 1785
436		"Ecco quel fiero istante" (Score); Notturno (terzet) for two sopranos and bass and three basset horns	Metastasio; La partenza	possibly 1783
437		"Mi lagnerò tacendo" (Score); Notturno (terzet) for two sopranos, bass, two clarinets and basset horn	Metastasio; Siroe, II, 1	possibly 1783
438		"Se lontan, ben mio, tu sei" (Score); Notturno (terzet) for two sopranos, bass, two clarinets and basset horn (fragment)	Metastasio; Strofe per musica	possibly 1783
439		"Due pupille amabili" (Score); Notturno (terzet) for two sopranos, bass and three basset horns	Giuseppe Petrosellini, L'incognita perseguitata	possibly 1783
441		"Liebes Manndel, wo ist's Bandel?" (Score); Terzet for soprano, tenor, bass and strings	Wolfgang Amadeus Mozart	possibly 1783
479		"Dite almeno, in che mancai" (Score/Crit. report); Aria for soprano, tenor, two basses and orchestra	unknown	5 November 1785
480		"Mandina amabile" (Score/Crit. report); Aria for soprano, tenor, bass and orchestra	unknown	21 November 1785
483		"Zerfließet heut', geliebte Brüder" (Score); Song with voice, 3-part male choir and organ	Augustin Veith Edler von Schittlersberg	December 1785
484		"Ihr unsre neuen Leiter" (Score); Song with voice, 3-part male choir and organ	Augustin Veith Edler von Schittlersberg	December 1785
489		"Spiegarti non poss'io" Duet for soprano and tenor Replacement duet for the characters Ilia (soprano), Idamante (tenor) and orchestra in Idomeneo	Giambattista Varesco	1786
532		"Grazie agl'inganni tuoi" (Score); Terzet for soprano, tenor, bass and orchestra (fragment)	Metastasio; La Libertà a Nice	possibly 1787
	540b	"Per queste tue manine" Duet for soprano and bass Replacement duet for the characters Zerlina (soprano), Leporello (bass) and orchestra in Don Giovanni	Lorenzo Da Ponte	1788
549		"Più non si trovano" (Score); Notturno (terzet) for two sopranos, bass and three basset horns	Metastasio; L'Olimpiade, I, 7	16 July 1788
Anh. 5	571a	"Caro mio Druck und Schluck" (Score); Quartet for soprano, two tenors, bass and piano (fragment)	Wolfgang Amadeus Mozart	beginning of 1789
615		"Viviamo felici in dolce contento" Choir of amateurs and strings (fragment)	Tommaso Grandi	1791
625	592a	"Nun, liebes Weibchen"; Duet for soprano, bass and orchestra	Emanuel Schikaneder	August 1790

== Songs ==
K^{1}	K^{6}	Composition, score and critical report (NMA)	Librettist	Date
53	47e	"An die Freude" (Score/Crit. report); Freude, Königin der Weisen; Possibly (Einstein) the aria for the daughter of Joseph Wolf from K. deest	Johann Peter Uz (1720–1796)	November 1768
147	125g	"Wie unglücklich bin ich nit" (Score/Crit. report)	unknown	1772
148	125h	"Lobgesang auf die feierliche Johannisloge" (Score/Crit. report); O heiliges Band der Freundschaft treuer Brüder	Ludwig Friedrich Lenz (1717–1780)	1772
307	284d	"Oiseaux, si tous les ans" (Score/Crit. report)	Antoine Houdart Ferrand (1678–1719)	30 October 1777
308	295b	"Dans un bois solitaire" (Score/Crit. report)	Antoine Houdar de la Motte (1672–1731)	between 30 October 1777 and 13/14 March 1778
343	336c	"Zwei deutsche Kirchenlieder" (Score/Crit. report); O Gotteslamm, Als aus Ägypten Israel	unknown	Spring 1787
349	367a	"Die Zufriedenheit" (Score/Crit. report); Was frag' ich viel nach Geld und Gut	Johann Martin Miller (1750–1814)	between 8 November 1780 and mid-March 1781
351	367b	"Komm, liebe Zither, komm" (Score/Crit. report)	unknown	between 8 November 1780 and mid-March 1781
390	340c	"Ich würd' auf meinem Pfad" (Score/Crit. report)	Johann Timotheus Hermes (1738–1821)	between August 1781 and May 1782
391	340b	"Sei du mein Trost" (Score/Crit. report)	Johann Timotheus Hermes (1738–1821)	between August 1781 and May 1782
392	340a	"Verdankt sei es dem Glanz der Großen" (Score/Crit. report)	Johann Timotheus Hermes (1738–1821)	between August 1781 and May 1782
Anh. 25	386d	"Bardengesang auf Gibraltar" (Score/Crit. report); O Calpe! Dir donnert's am Fusse (sketch)	Michael Denis (1729–1800)	end of December 1782
468		"Lied zur Gesellenreise" (Score/Crit. report); Die ihr einem neuen Grad	Joseph Franz von Ratschky (1757–1810)	26 March 1785
472		"Der Zauberer" (Score/Crit. report); Ihr Mädchen, flieht Damöten [Damoetas] ja!	Christian Felix Weiße (1726–1804)	7 May 1785
473		"Die Zufriedenheit" (Score/Crit. report); Wie sanft, wie ruhig	Christian Felix Weiße (1726–1804)	7 May 1785
474		"Die betrogene Welt" (Score/Crit. report); Der reiche Tor	Christian Felix Weiße (1726–1804)	7 May 1785
476		"Das Veilchen" (Score/Crit. report); Ein Veilchen auf der Wiese stand	Johann Wolfgang von Goethe	8 June 1785
506		"Lied der Freiheit" (Score/Crit. report); Wer unter eines Mädchens Hand	Aloys Blumauer (1755–1798)	end of 1785
Anh. 26	475a	"Einsam bin ich, meine Liebe" (Score/Crit. report) fragment	Johann Martin Miller (1750–1814)	possibly 1785
517		"Die Alte" (Score/Crit. report); Zu meiner Zeit, zu meiner Zeit	Friedrich von Hagedorn (1708–1754)	18 May 1787
518		"Die Verschweigung" (Score/Crit. report); Sobald Damötas Chloen sieht	Christian Felix Weiße (1726–1804)	20 May 1787
519		"Das Lied der Trennung" (Score/Crit. report); Die Engel Gottes weinen	Klamer Eberhard Karl Schmidt (1746–1824)	23 May 1787
520		"Als Luise die Briefe ihres ungetreuen Liebhabers verbrannte" (Score/Crit. report); Erzeugt von heißer Phantasie	Gabriele von Baumberg (1766–1839)	26 May 1787
523		"Abendempfindung" (Score/Crit. report); Abend ist's, die Sonne ist verschwunden	unknown	24 June 1787
524		"An Chloe" (Score/Crit. report); Wenn die Lieb' aus deinen blauen, hellen, offnen Augen sieht	Johann Georg Jacobi (1740–1814)	24 June 1787
529		"Des kleinen Friedrichs Geburtstag" (Score/Crit. report); Es war einmal, ihr Leute	Johann Eberhard Friedrich Schall (1742–1790), last verse by Joachim Heinrich Campe (1746–1818)	6 November 1787
530		"Das Traumbild" (Score/Crit. report); Wo bist du, Bild	Ludwig Christoph Heinrich Hölty (1748–1776)	6 November 1787
531		"Die kleine Spinnerin" (Score/Crit. report); Was spinnst du?	unknown	11 December 1787
552		"Lied beim Auszug in das Feld" (Score/Crit. report); Dem hohen Kaiserworte treu	unknown	11 August 1788
596		"Sehnsucht nach dem Frühlinge" (Score/Crit. report); Komm, lieber Mai, und mache	Christian Adolph Overbeck (1755–1821)	14 January 1791
597		"Der Frühling" (Score/Crit. report); Erwacht zum neuen Leben	Christoph Christian Sturm (1740–1786)	14 January 1791
598		"Das Kinderspiel" (Score/Crit. report); Wir Kinder, wir schmecken der Freuden recht viel!	Christian Adolph Overbeck (1755–1821)	14 January 1791

== Canons ==
K^{1}	K^{6}	Composition, score and critical report (NMA)	Librettist	Date
89	73k	"Kyrie in G" (Score); Kyrie a cinque con diversi canoni	liturgical text	May 1770
89a II	73r	"Four Riddle Canons" (Score); Sit trium series una: Incipe Menalios for 3 voices; Ter ternis canite vocibus: Cantate Domino for 9 voices; Canon ad duodecimam: Confitebor tibi Domine for 3 voices; Canon. Ter voce ciemus: Thebana bella for 6 voices	unknown	Summer 1770
89a	73i	"Canon for 4 instruments" (Score)	—	April 1770
228	515b	"Ach! zu kurz" (Score); Double canon for 4 voices	unknown	before 24 June 1787
229	382a	"Sie ist dahin" (Score); Canon for 3 voices	Ludwig Heinrich Christoph Hölty (1748–1776)	1782
230	382b	"Selig, selig" (Score); Canon for 2 voices	Ludwig Heinrich Christoph Hölty (1748–1776)	1782
231	382c	"Leck mich im Arsch" / "Lasst uns froh sein") (Score); Canon for 6 voices	probably WA Mozart himself	1782
232	509a	"Lieber Freistädtler, lieber Gaulimauli" (Score); Canon for 4 voices	probably WA Mozart himself	after 4 June 1787
233	382d	"Leck mir den Arsch fein recht schön sauber" (Score) / "Nichts labt mich mehr als Wein" – Canon for 3 voices	probably WA Mozart himself	1782
234	382e	"Bei der Hitz im Sommer eß ich" (Score) / "Essen, Trinken" – Canon for 3 voices	probably WA Mozart himself	1782
347	382f	"Wo der perlende Wein im Glase blinkt" (Score); Canon for 6 voices	unknown	1782
348	382g	"V'amo di core" (Score); Quadruple canon for 12 voices (3 choirs)	unknown	1782
deest		1. "Canon for 6" (sketch) (Score)	—	1781/82 or later
deest		2. "Canon for 4" (sketch) (Score)	—	1781/82 or later
deest		3. "Canon for 4" (sketch) (Score)	—	1781/82 or later
deest		4. "Canon for 4" (sketch) (Score)	—	end of 1785/1786
507		"Heiterkeit und leichtes Blut" (Score); Canon for 3 voices		after 3 June 1786
508		"Auf das Wohl aller Freunde" (Score); Canon for 3 voices (sopranos)	unknown	after 3 June 1786
	508a	2 canons for 3 sopranos / 14 Interval canons (8 movements/sections) (Score); Canons for various voices (sketches)	—	after 3 June 1786
deest		6. "Canon for 3" (sketch) (Score)	—	after 3 June 1786
deest		7. "Canon for 2" (sketch) (Score)	—	after 3 June 1786
deest		"Canon for 4" (Score)	—	Summer 1786
553		"Alleluia" (Score); Canon for 4 voices	liturgical text	2 September 1788
554		"Ave Maria" (Score); Canon for 3 voices	liturgical text	2 September 1788
555		"Lacrimoso son'io" (Score); Canon for 4 voices	liturgical text	2 September 1788
556		"Grechtelt's enk" (Score); Canon for 4 voices	unknown	2 September 1788
557		"Nascoso è il mio sol" (Score); Canon for 4 voices	unknown	2 September 1788
558		"Gehn wir im Prater, gehn wir in d'Hetz" (Score); Canon for 4 voices	unknown	2 September 1788
559		"Difficile lectu mihi mars" (Score); Canon for 3 voices	probably WA Mozart himself	2 September 1788
560a	559a	"O du eselhafter Peierl" (Score); Canon for 3 voices	probably WA Mozart himself	between 1785 and 1787
560b	560	"O du eselhafter Martin (Jakob)" (Score); Canon for 4 voices	probably WA Mozart himself	2 September 1788
deest		9. "Canon for 4" (sketch) (Score)	—	1787 or 1788
deest		10. "Canon for 4" (sketch) (Score)	—	1787 or 1788
deest		11. "Canon for 4" (sketch) (Score)	—	1787 or 1788
561		"Bona nox! bist a rechta Ox" (Score); Canon for 4 voices	WA Mozart	2 September 1788
562		"Caro bell' idol mio" (Score); Canon for 4 voices	unknown	2 September 1788
	562a	"Canon for 4" (Score)	—	unknown
	562c	"Canon for 4 Instruments" (Score); Canon for 2 violins, viola, bass	—	unknown
	616b	"Canonical Study for 4" (Score)	—	Summer 1787

== See also ==
- List of compositions by Wolfgang Amadeus Mozart
- Köchel catalogue
