= Ch'io mi scordi di te? =

1786 soprano aria by W. A. Mozart

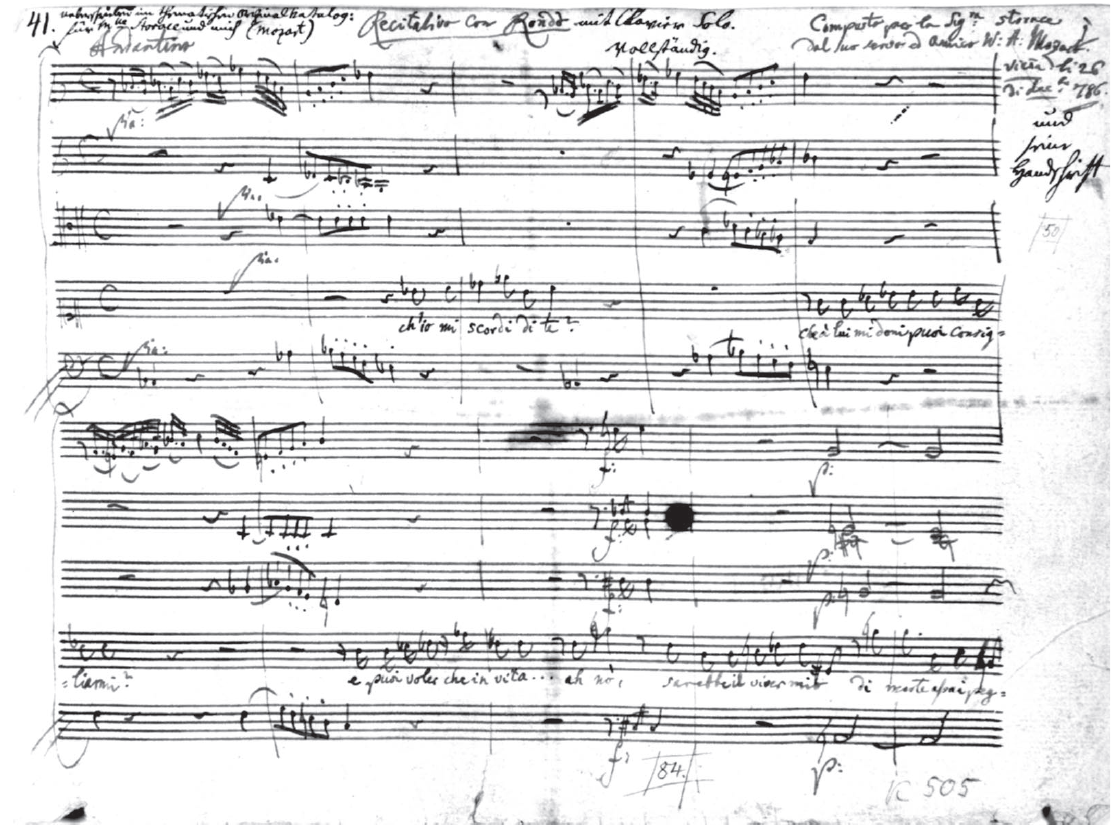
First page of the autograph manuscript

"Ch'io mi scordi di te? ... Non temer, amato bene" (Will I forget you? ... Fear not, beloved), K. 505, is a concert aria by Wolfgang Amadeus Mozart for soprano, piano obbligato and orchestra, composed in December 1786 in Vienna.

== History ==
Earlier in 1786, Mozart had composed a previous score, musically only distantly related on the same text, as an insertion aria for the character Idamante in a revised version of his 1781 opera Idomeneo. It was made for a private performance in Prince Auersperg's palace in Vienna. For that concert, Mozart reworked the role of Idamante (originally a castrato) for the tenor voice, and the substitution of this scena (recitative and rondò "Non più. Tutto ascoltai... Non temer, amato bene", K. 490) for that of 1781 was only one of many changes that resulted from this recasting.

The K. 505 setting was written for Nancy Storace, probably for her farewell concert from Vienna on 23 February 1787 at the Theater am Kärntnertor. Mozart himself very likely played the obbligato piano part (K. 490 has an extensive violin obbligato). The words to the aria have been thought to be by Lorenzo Da Ponte; Cuthbert Girdlestone writes that they are in both cases (K. 490 and K. 505), with the exception of the short recitative, exactly those of Giambattista Varesco's original Idomeneo libretto of 1781, but according to the Neue Mozart-Ausgabe the writer is unknown. Mozart entered the work on 27 December 1786 into his catalogue with the remark: "for Mlle Storace and me". He performed it again with Josepha Duschek on 12 May 1789 in the Gewandhaus in Leipzig on his Berlin journey.

== Structure ==
The work is scored for two clarinets, two bassoons, two horns in E♭, strings with divided violas, soprano, piano.

The aria consists of two sections, the recitative, 27 bars in G minor ("Ch'io mi scordi di te?") and the aria itself, 219 bars, a rondò in E-flat major ("Non temer, amato bene"). A performance takes approximately ten minutes.

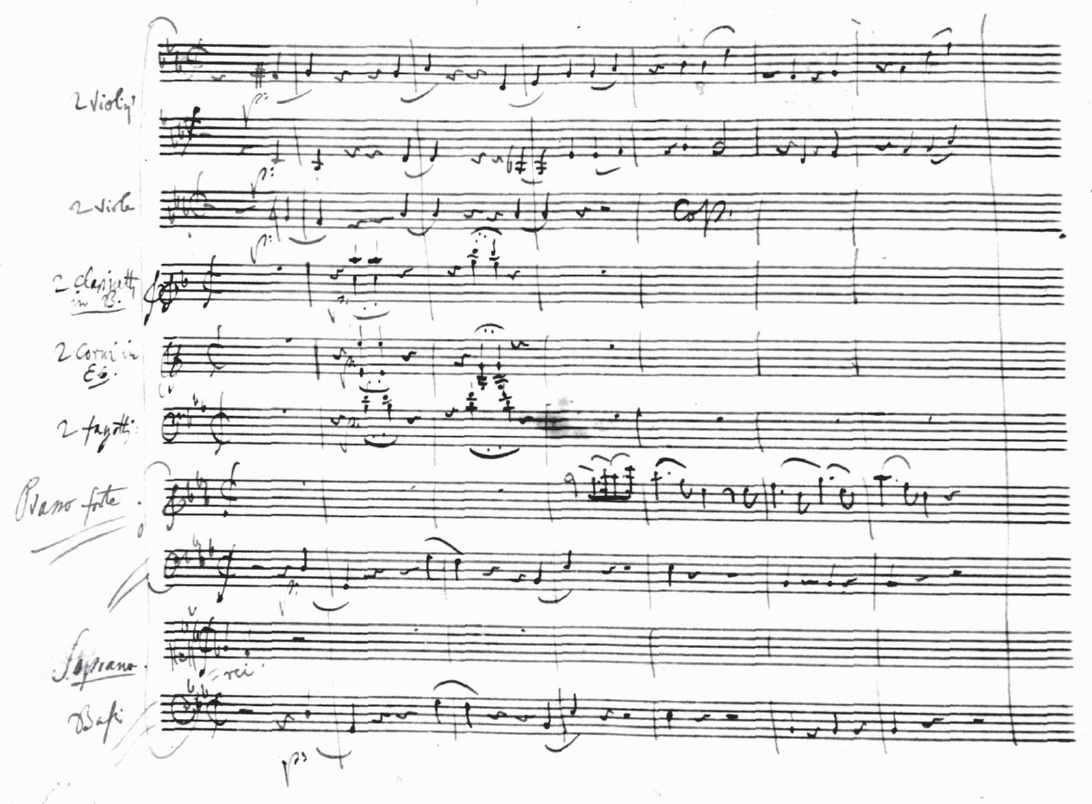
First bars of the rondò (autograph manuscript)

The piece opens with strings alone, followed by an alternation with the soprano solo. After the opening few phrases the tempo briefly becomes faster and more rigorous, but soon returns to that of the beginning, with the voice now accompanied by the strings. This is followed by the winds' introduction of a modulation to E-flat major, at which point the piano enters in a light, gentle almost flirtatious upwards moving passage which sets the theme of the opening of the rondò. The soprano then re-enters, the piano providing a more prominent accompaniment interspersed with solo passages. Throughout the rondò there is a considerable amount of coloratura and sustained notes. There is a sudden tempo change ushered in by the piano in rapid scales. There is then a brief passage in which only the piano accompanies the orchestra. A new theme is then introduced and repeated, after which another intense moment is introduced with repetition of the word perchè ? (why?) by the soprano. After this there is a passage in the minor with only the piano and soprano. However, the winds and piano soon lead back to the major, at which point the theme of the rondò is repeated at the faster tempo. A considerable amount of coloratura from the soprano follows, culminating in two high notes which then further lead to a trill, and to the glorious ending accompanied by arpeggios in the piano.

== Libretto ==
Recitativo
Ch'io mi scordi di te?
Che a lui mi doni puoi consigliarmi?
E puoi voler che in vita…
Ah no! Sarebbe il viver mio di morte assai peggior.
Venga la morte, intrepida l'attendo.
Ma, ch'io possa struggermi ad altra face,
ad altr'oggetto donar gl'affetti miei, come tentarlo?
Ah, di dolor morrei!

Aria
Non temer, amato bene,
per te sempre il cor sarà.
Più non reggo a tante pene,
l'alma mia mancando va.
Tu sospiri? O duol funesto!
Pensa almen, che istante è questo!
Non mi posso, oh Dio! spiegar.
Stelle barbare, stelle spietate,
perchè mai tanto rigor?
Alme belle, che vedete
le mie pene in tal momento,
dite voi, s'egual tormento
può soffrir un fido cor?

Recitative
You ask that I forget you?
You can advise me to give myself to him?
And this while yet I live?
Ah no! My life would be far worse than death!
Let death come, I await it fearlessly.
But how could I attempt to warm myself at another flame,
to lavish my affections on another?
Ah! I should die of grief!

Aria
Fear nothing, my beloved,
my heart will always be yours.
I can no longer suffer such distress,
my spirit begins to fail me.
You sigh? O mournful sorrow!
Just think what a moment this is!
O God! I cannot express myself.
Barbarous stars, pitiless stars,
why ever are you so stern?
Fair souls who see
my sufferings at such a moment,
tell me if a faithful heart
can suffer such torment?
