= Beim Auszug in das Feld =

1788 patriotic art song by W. A. Mozart

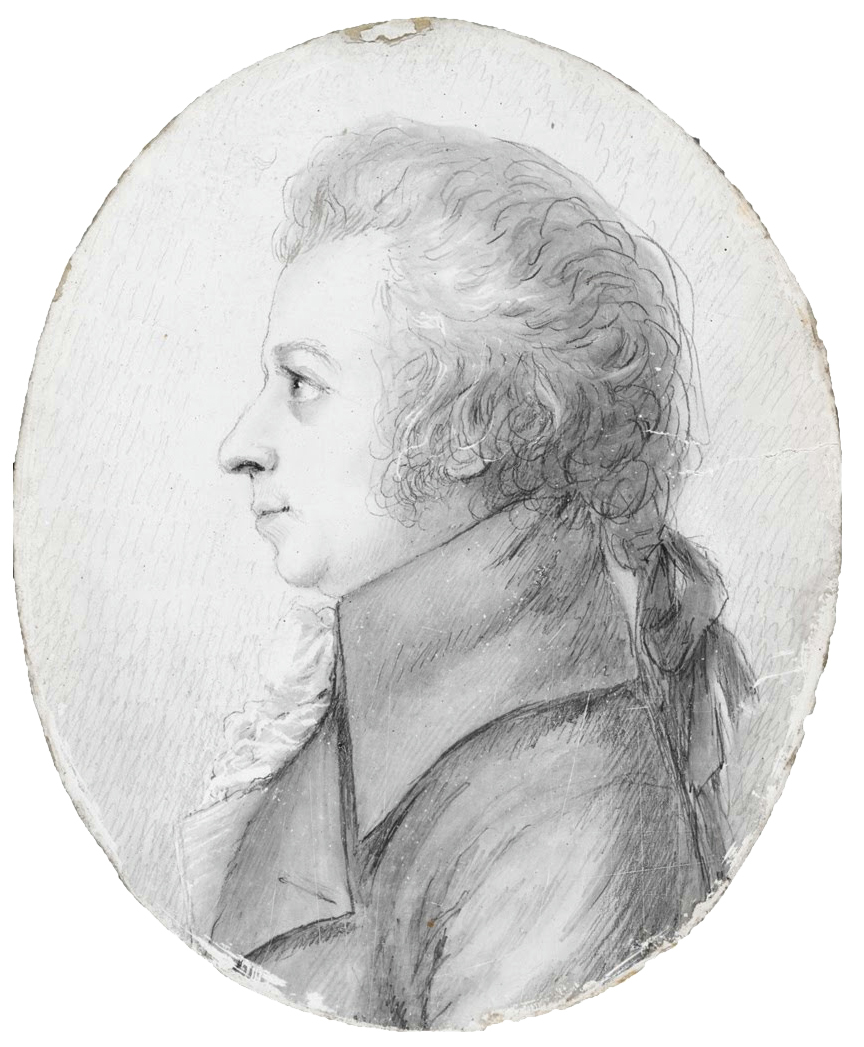
Dora Stock's 1789 miniature of Mozart

"Beim Auszug in das Feld", K. 552, is a military-patriotic art song composed for tenor voice and piano accompaniment by Wolfgang Amadeus Mozart. The title may be translated "On going forth to the field" (i.e., of battle).

== Composition and publication ==
Mozart entered the composition into his personal catalog of completed works on 11 August 1788, one day after he had similarly recorded the completion of his celebrated Symphony No. 41 (Jupiter Symphony). The song was a response to the war against Turkey that had been launched by the Austrian emperor (and Mozart's patron) Joseph II; said war initially gave rise to a highly patriotic public response, though later on it proved a fiasco (negligible territorial gains, severe economic stress, and the loss of political freedom).

The song was one of three patriotic works written by Mozart in response to the war. Christoph Wolff writes that Mozart "paid patriotic tribute when he wrote the orchestral contradanse La bataille, K. 535, a piece of martial music on the siege of Belgrade for the entertainment of the Redoubtensaal society" (the Redoubtensäle were the Imperial ballrooms, and Mozart's job with the Emperor required him to write music to be danced there). Wolff also mentions "the war song 'Ich möchte wohl der Kaiser sein' ('I wish I were the emperor'), K. 539, for bass and a Turkish-style military band"; it was sung by the comedian Friedrich Baumann in a patriotic concert in the Theater in der Leopoldstadt in Vienna, 7 March 1788. (Note: Elaine Sisman speculates that Mozart's Symphony No. 41 (Jupiter Symphony), completed the day before "Beim Auszug in das Feld", may be patriotic music prompted by the war; she observes that he began work on it the month that the war broke out (February 1788) and places the work in "the Austrian tradition of grand C-major symphonies, scored for trumpets and drums [and] employing the fanfares and rhythmic gestures of the military".)

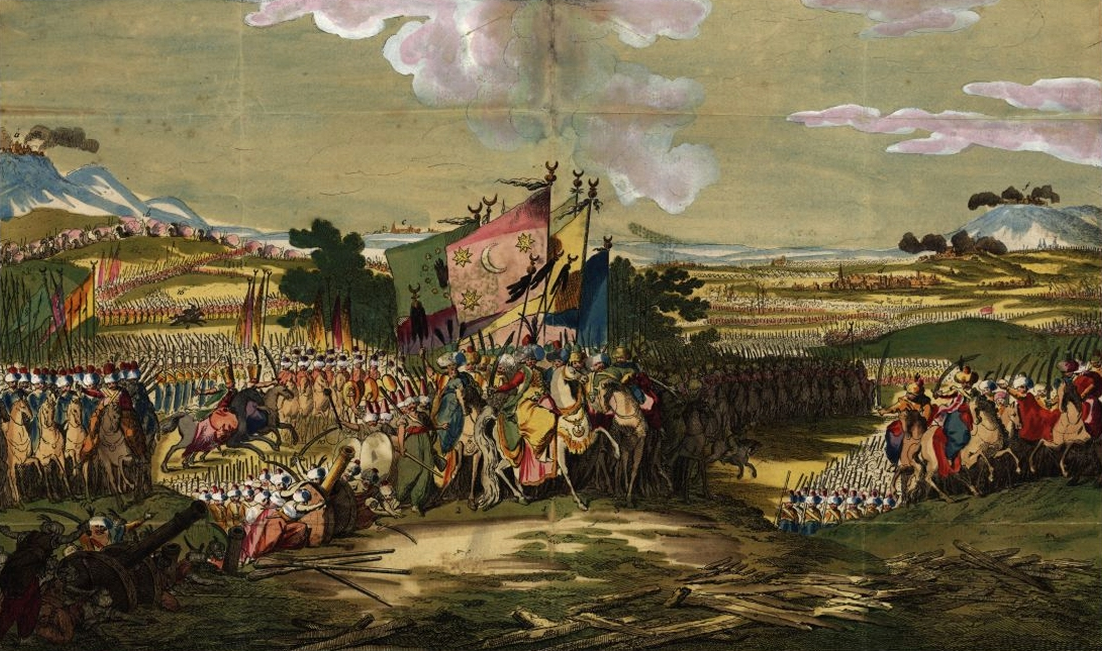
The enemy portrayed in the song: the Turks advance on Sofia, May 1788

"Beim Auszug in das Feld" was published in "a short-lived periodical, to which Mozart subscribed, entitled Wochenblatt für Kinder zur angenehmen und lehrreichen Beschäftigung in ihren Freystunden ('Weekly for children, providing Pleasant and Instructive Occupation in their Leisure Hours'; iv, 1788)". The journal publication also provided some annotation and commentary, highly patriotic in tone.

According to Alexander Hyatt King, only three copies of the original publication survive today; Mozart's autograph (hand-written original) is lost.

== Lyrics ==
Mozart set 18 stanzas of verse by an unknown poet; each repetition of the music covers two stanzas, so the music is sung nine times to cover the whole poem.

Dem hohen Kaiserworte treu,
rief Joseph seinen Heeren:
Sie eilten flügelschnell herbei,
voll Durst nach Sieg und Ehren.

Gern zieht man ja dem Vater nach,
der seine Kinder liebet
und sorgt, daß sie kein Ungemach,
selbst nicht Gefahr betrübet.

Joseph called forth his armies;
faithful to the emperor's lofty words,
they hurried to him as if on wings,
thirsting for victory and honor.

For one gladly heeds the call of a father
who loves and cares for his children,
so that no misfortune
or even danger can trouble them.

Wo sie erschienen, fanden sie
von Speis' und Trank die Fülle;
und lohnt nicht schon des Helden Müh'
oft Dank und guter Wille?

Doch mehr als alles dieses stählt
der Männer Brust zum Streite
der Trostgedanke, daß ins Feld
Gott selber sie geleite.

Wherever they appeared, they found
their fill of food and drink;
and do not thanks and good will of themselves
reward the hero's efforts?

Yet more than anything else,
the breasts of men are steeled for combat
by the comforting thought that God Himself
leads them into battle.

Denn Vater Josephs Beispiel schnitt
sich tief in ihre Herzen:
Wo ungerecht die Menschheit litt,
da fühlten sie auch Schmerzen.

Denn alle Menschheit, alle, ist
vom großen Gott gekommen,
der Heid' und Türk', wie Jud' und Christ
zum Kind ihm angenommen.

Because father Joseph's example cut
deep into their hearts:
Where humanity unjustly suffered
they also felt the pains.

'Cause all humanity, all, has
come from mighty God,
Heathen and Turk, Jew and Christian
are accepted as His children.

Drum läßt er seinen Regen so
für Jud' und Türk' und Heiden,
wie für den Christen reich und froh
die nackten Felder kleiden.

Drum aber will er auch, daß nie
die Menschen Menschen kränken,
gesetzt auch, daß oft anders sie
als ihre Brüder denken.

That's why He lets the rain
for Jew and Turk and heathen,
as for the Christian rich and joyful
cover the naked fields.

But that's also why He wants
that man never offend man,
even if they often
think different to their brothers.

Ein Gott auf Erden duldete
so Joseph Türk' und Jüden
und schützte sie vor Druck und Weh
und suchte Völkerfrieden.

Den gab ihm auch die ganze Welt,
nur ein Volk war zuwider:
Dies glaubt allein sich auserwählt
und kennt sonst keine Brüder;

Thus Joseph, like a god on earth,
extended toleration to the Turks and the Jews
protecting them from oppression and harm
and seeking peace among all peoples.

And peace was granted him by all the people of the world,
save one single nation that resisted,
that imagines itself a chosen people
and knows no outsider for a brother.

Und kennt kein Recht als seine Hand
und keine Pflicht als Morden,
wodurch so manches schöne Land
zu Wüst' und Graus geworden.

Doch nimmt es eine Larve vor,
schwätzt viel von Treu' und Glauben
und raunet andern in das Ohr,
als wolle man's berauben.

And knows no justice but its own fist
and no duty other than to murder,
so that many a beautiful country
has been reduced to a horrific wasteland.

Yet it hides behind a mask,
and prattles about fidelity and belief,
and whispers in other's ears
as if it itself were the victim.

Und möchte so durch Heuchellist
der Brüder Herz bestricken,
daß manche, aufgereizt im Zwist,
ihm gar noch Hilfe schicken.

Doch dies wird unser guter Gott
wohl gnädiglich verhüten:
Er will ja nicht der Brüder Tod,
will Unrecht ja vergüten!

And so it seeks through cunning sham
to bewitch the brothers' hearts
that some, inflamed in quarrel,
will even send it aid.

But this will our good God
prevent with his grace:
He does not want the brothers' death,
He even rewards injustice.

Bei uns wird jeder Bruder steh'n,
der Recht und Menschheit schätzet,
denn ihre Wohlfahrt zu erhöh'n.
ist unser Schwert gewätzet!

Drum, tapfre Streiter, kämpft mit Mut
um eure Ehrenkronen!
Gott selbst wird euer Heldenblut
an seinem Thron belohnen!

Every brother who values justice and humanity
will stand by us,
for it is to help the cause of humanity
that our swords are sharpened.

So, bold warriors, fight with spirit
for your crowns of honour!
god Himself will reward your heroes' blood
at his throne.

Und eure Enkel segnen euch
mit heißem Dankentzücken
für jeden angebrachten Streich,
der einst sie half beglücken:

Denn eure Namen sammeln wir
hier, wie ins Buch des Lebens,
für ihre Lieb' und Dankbegier,
ihr Helden, nicht vergebens!

And your descendents will also bless you
with warm, delighted thanks
for every well-aimed blow
that secured their happiness in times past:

For we're recording your names
here and in the Book of Life,
to show love and gratitude,
Ye heroes, let it not be in vain!

Derek Beales describes the lyrics as "manifestly propagandist, directed at persuading young men of the justice of the emperor's cause". Another English translation, in metrical verse, may be found in his book Enlightenment and Reform in Eighteenth-Century Europe.

== Music ==
The song is short (21 bars long) and the music includes many dotted rhythms, characteristic of a military march. Its key signature is A major and its time signature is (2/2) with a tempo indication of Mäßig (moderate). The music combines pairs of stanzas into its Strophic form.

== History and critical reception ==
After Mozart's death, the work went missing and was restored to the awareness of scholars and musicians only early in the 20th century; further decades were needed before the work was printed in standard scholarly editions.

Beales' essay "Court, Government and Society in Mozart's Vienna" suggests that a certain degree of taboo has shrouded the work, based perhaps in scholars' reluctance to imagine Mozart participating in the creation of truculent military propaganda. One early published English-language edition eliminated the lyrics entirely, substituting a poem entitled "The Maiden and the Faun". Subsequent recordings and publications have omitted certain verses in a way that "minimiz[es] the song's bellicosity". One apologist viewpoint is offered by pianist Ulrich Eisenlohr in commentary for his Naxos Records recording of the song; he suggests that while the words are bellicose, Mozart's setting is (subversively) not so:

[The song can be] regarded as a commission. It was intended as propaganda for young people to support the unpopular Turkish campaign of Emperor Joseph II in 1788. Whether Mozart himself took the commission and subject-matter entirely seriously is open to doubt, if the subtle and humorous music is anything to go by. The big pause between "... rief Joseph seinen Heeren" ("...Joseph summoned his armies") and "sie eilten flügelschnell herbei" (“they hurried quickly to him”) has the effect of an irritating delay in the alleged lightning-quick and eager drawing-up of the army, while the violent and somewhat grotesque outburst right at the start of the piano postlude can be seen as having subversive potential.

The work is widely unknown today and is seldom performed or recorded; Beales calls it "one of the most obscure of Mozart's published and completed works".

== Notes and references ==
Notes

Sources

- Beales, Derek (1996). "Court, Government and Society in Mozart's Vienna". In Stanley Sadie (ed.). Wolfgang Amadè Mozart: Essays on his Life and Music. Oxford: Clarendon Press. pp. 3–20. ISBN 978-0-19-816443-2.
