= Elaine Sisman =

American musicologist (born 1952)

Elaine Rochelle Sisman
- Born: January 20, 1952 (age 74)

Academic background
- Education: Princeton University; Harvard University

Academic work
- Discipline: Musicology
- Institutions: University of Michigan; Columbia University

Elaine Rochelle Sisman (born January 20, 1952) is an American musicologist. The Anne Parsons Bender Professor of Music at Columbia University, Sisman specializes in music, rhetoric, and aesthetics of the 18th and 19th centuries, and has written on such topics as memory and invention in late Beethoven, ideas of pathétique and fantasia around 1800, Haydn's theater symphonies, the sublime in Mozart's music, and Brahms's slow movements. She is the author of Haydn and the Classical Variation and Mozart: The 'Jupiter' Symphony and editor of Haydn and His World. Her monograph-length article on "variations" appears in the revised New Grove Dictionary of Music and Musicians, and she is at work on studies of music and melancholy, of Don Giovanni, and of the opus-concept in the eighteenth century.

== Education ==
Sisman studied piano at the Juilliard pre-college division. She graduated from Cornell University in 1972, studying with Malcolm Bilson and received her doctorate in music history at Princeton University in 1978.

== Career ==
Sisman has taught at the University of Michigan and Harvard University, as well as Columbia University where she currently teaches, having joined the faculty in 1982. Sisman served for six years as chair of Columbia's Department of Music (1999–2005). She serves on the board of directors of the Joseph Haydn-Institut in Cologne, the Akademie für Mozartforschung in Salzburg, and the American Brahms Society, and is an editor of Beethoven Forum and associate editor of The Musical Quarterly and 19th-Century Music. She was President of the American Musicological Society in 2005–06.

Sisman's work has been highly regarded. Reviewing Haydn and the Classical Variation, Laszlo Somfai wrote, "Elaine Sisman's excellent book will be a major inspiration for younger scholars and for the vast majority of readers in and outside English-speaking countries."

== Examples ==
Some examples of Sisman's creative thinking in musicology are described in this encyclopedia; see:

- Autobiographical sketch (Haydn). Sisman suggests that Haydn wrote this document following principles of Latin rhetoric that he had learned in his youth.
- Double variation. Sisman shows that this musical form was a favorite not just of Haydn, but later on, in slightly disguised form, of Beethoven.
- Beim Auszug in das Feld. Sisman suggests that Mozart's celebrated final symphony (No. 41), was written in part to address the patriotic fervor that had arisen from the Austro-Turkish War of 1788-1791. In this respect it would resemble the now-obscure song "Beim Auszug in das Feld," written at the same time.

== Awards ==
Sisman has been awarded grants from the National Endowment for the Humanities and the American Council of Learned Societies. In 1983 she received the Alfred Einstein Award of the American Musicological Society for best article by a younger scholar. Columbia has honored her with its Great Teacher Award in 1992 and the Award for Distinguished Service to the Core Curriculum in 2000. In 2014 Sisman was elected to the American Academy of Arts and Sciences.

== Selected publications ==
- ed. Haydn and His World (Princeton: Princeton University Press, 1997)
- Mozart: The "Jupiter" Symphony No. 41 in C major, K. 551 (Cambridge: Cambridge University Press, 1993)
- Haydn and the Classical Variation (Cambridge: Harvard University Press, 1993)
- "After the Heroic Style: Fantasia and Beethoven's 'Characteristic' Sonatas of 1809," Beethoven Forum 6 (1997)
- "Genre, Gesture, and Meaning in Mozart's 'Prague Symphony,'" in Mozart Studies 2 (Oxford: Oxford University Press, 1997)
- "Pathos and Pathetique: Rhetorical Stance in Beethoven's Piano Sonata in C minor, Op.13," Beethoven Forum 3 (1994)
- "Brahms and the Variation Canon," 19th-Century Music 14 (1990), 132-53
- "Haydn's Theater Symphonies," Journal of the American Musicological Society 43 (1990)
- "Small and Expanded Forms: Koch's Model and Haydn's Music," The Musical Quarterly 68 (1982)

== See also ==
- Women in musicology
