= An Chloe =

1787 art song by W. A. Mozart

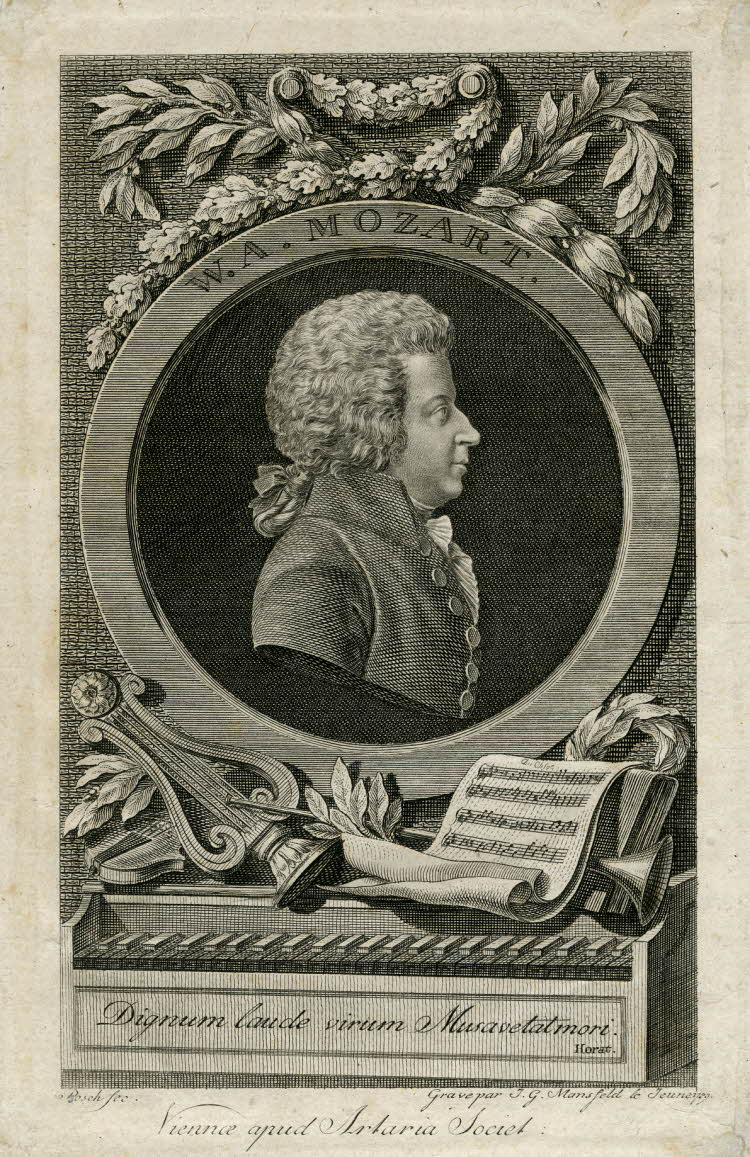
Mozart bust medallion by Joseph Georg Mansfeld, with the score of "An Chloe", published in 1789 by Artaria

"An Chloe" (To Chloe), K. 524, is an art song for voice and piano by Wolfgang Amadeus Mozart to a poem by Johann Georg Jacobi. Mozart composed it on 24 June 1787 in Vienna.

== Text ==
Jacobi's poem consists of 13 four-line stanzas with an A–B–A–B rhyme scheme. Mozart, who found it in the Göttinger Musenalmanach from 1785, used only the first four. The stanzas not used tell how the lovers' happiness was cut short by betrayal and death. The "death" in the third stanza refers to the height of passion after which the lovers release their embrace – la petite mort. From the ancient Greek novel Daphnis and Chloe, Chloe is the name of a shepherdess often used in poetic pastoral settings.

Wenn die Lieb' aus deinen blauen,
hellen, offnen Augen sieht,
und vor Lust hinein zu schauen
mir's im Herzen klopft und glüht;

Und ich halte dich und küsse
deine Rosenwangen warm,
liebes Mädchen, und ich schließe
zitternd dich in meinem Arm,

Mädchen, Mädchen, und ich drücke
dich an meinen Busen fest,
der im letzten Augenblicke
sterbend nur dich von sich läßt;

den berauschten Blick umschattet
eine düstre Wolke mir,
und ich sitze dann ermattet,
aber selig neben dir.

When love shines from your blue,
bright, open eyes,
and the joy of gazing into them
makes my heart pound and glows;

And I hold you and kiss
Your rosy cheeks warm,
dear girl, and I clasp
you trembling in my arms,

Girl, girl, and I press
you firmly to my breast,
which at the last moment,
only dying, lets you go;

My intoxicated gaze is shadowed
by a gloomy cloud,
and then I sit, exhausted,
but blissful, next to you.

== Music ==
Apart from the first six bars that Mozart entered into his catalogue, the autograph is lost, presumably by the first publisher, Artaria, where it was published in 1789. It was so popular that it was published in Munich and in Denmark (in a Danish translation) during Mozart's lifetime, and in many editions in the following decades.

Mozart's catalogue entry gives the tempo as allegretto, Artaria gives it as allegro. The key signature is E-flat major, the time signature is alla breve (2/2), the vocal range is from D_{4} to A♭_{5}, and the work consists of 74 bars, taking about 2 1/2 minutes to perform.

The form of the composition is not strophic, but a rondo (A–B–A–C–A′) with a coda. The vocal line is independent from the keyboard accompaniment. Upward leaps in the melody in bars 8, 9, 13 indicate the lovers' delight, piano staccato in bars 21 and 23 depicts heartbeats, there are shivers (piano bars 24, 25, voice melisma 35, 36), breathlessness (mid-word rests in bars 41, 43), and fatigue (longer rests in bars 49 and 50, leading to a general pause in bar 51). The coda invokes operatic style in bars 65 to 70, and bars 62 to 65 employ sudden dynamic changes from the Mannheim school. The piano reuses its prelude below the voice in bar 67 and extends it to form a postlude. The first three verses are covered in 39 bars, while the fourth alone takes 30.

Several engravers used that score in their depictions of Mozart.
