= Symphony No. 41 (Mozart) =

Last symphony (1788) by W. A. Mozart

- Jupiter
- by W. A. Mozart
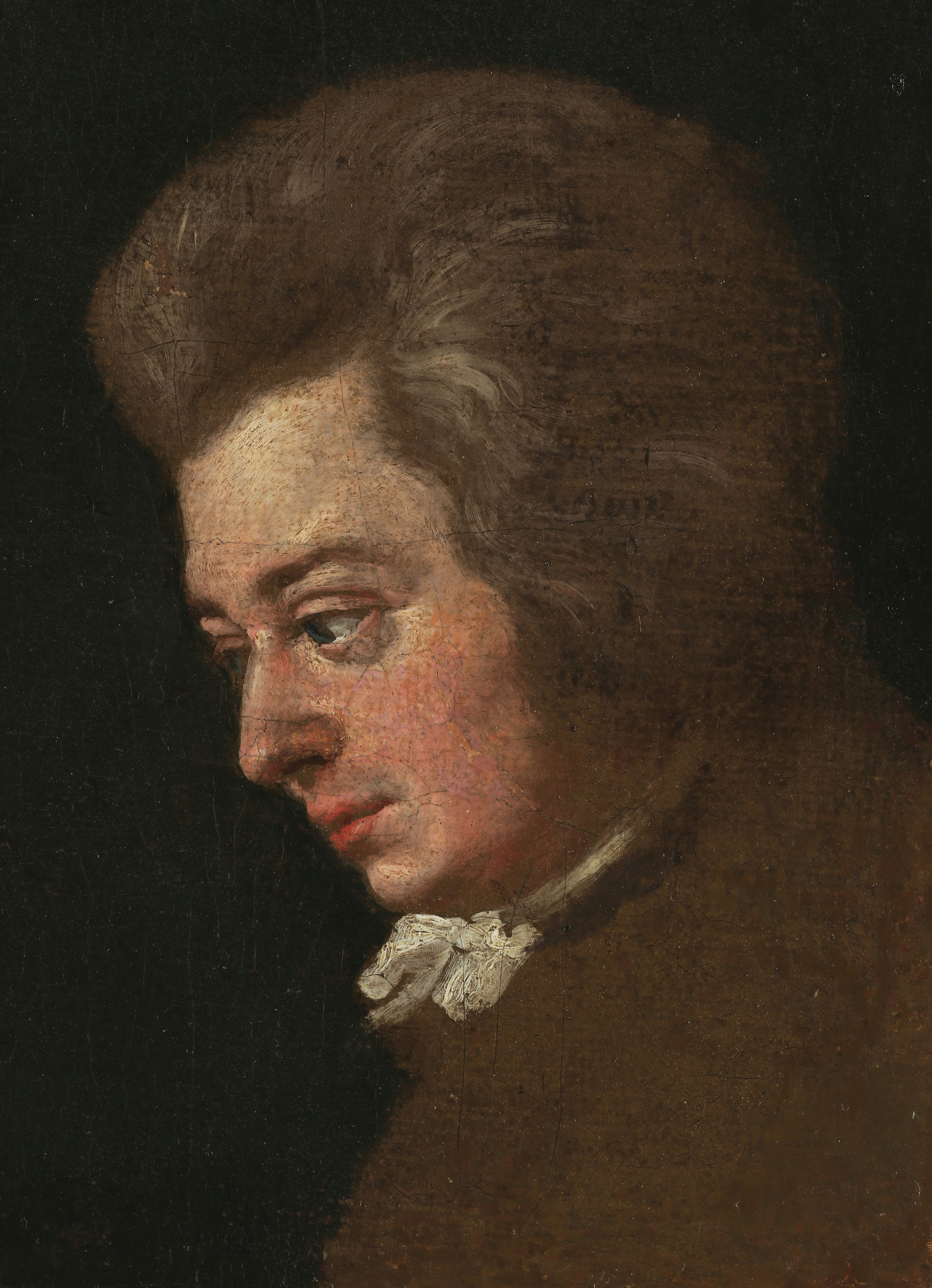
- Mozart, c. 1783
- Key: C major
- Catalogue: K. 551
- Composed: 1788
- Duration: ca. 33 minutes
- Movements: 4
- Scoring: Orchestra

Wolfgang Amadeus Mozart completed his Symphony No. 41 in C major, K. 551, on 10 August 1788. The longest and last symphony that he composed, it is regarded by many critics as among the greatest symphonies in classical music. The work is nicknamed the Jupiter Symphony, probably coined by the impresario Johann Peter Salomon.

The autograph manuscript of the symphony is preserved in the Berlin State Library.

== Instrumentation ==
- Woodwinds: flute, 2 oboes, 2 bassoons
- Brass: 2 horns in C (and in F in the Andante), 2 trumpets in C
- Percussion: timpani
- Strings: first and second violins, violas, cellos, double basses

== History ==
The work is the final of a set of three symphonies Mozart composed in rapid succession during the summer of 1788: no. 39 was completed on 26 June and no. 40 on 25 July. Nikolaus Harnoncourt argues that Mozart composed the three as a unified work, pointing among other things to the fact that the Symphony No. 41, as the final work, has no introduction (unlike no. 39) but has a grand finale.

Around the same time as he composed the three symphonies, Mozart was writing his piano trios in E major (K. 542) and C major (K. 548), his piano sonata No. 16 in C (K. 545)—the so-called Sonata facile, and a violin sonatina (K. 547).

It is not known for certain whether the symphony was ever performed in the composer's lifetime. According to Otto Erich Deutsch, Mozart was preparing to hold a series of "Concerts in the Casino" around this time in a new casino in the Spiegelgasse owned by Philipp Otto. Mozart even sent a pair of tickets for this series to his friend Michael Puchberg. Historians have not determined whether the concert series was held or was cancelled for lack of interest. However, the new symphony in C was performed at the Gewandhaus in Leipzig in 1789—at least according to its concert programme.

The musicologist Elaine Sisman proposed that the symphony might have been a patriotic work. Its key and orchestration fit with the "Austrian tradition of grand C-major symphonies, scored for trumpets and drums, employing the fanfares and rhythmic gestures of the military, the throne, and even the church". She suggests that it may have been occasioned by the Austro-Turkish War of 1788–1791, pointing out that the day following the completion of the symphony, Mozart completed a patriotic song "Beim Auszug in das Feld", K. 552.

== Movements ==
Symphony No. 41
I. Allegro vivace

II. Andante cantabile

III. Menuetto: Allegretto – Trio

IV. Molto allegro
The New York Philharmonic conducted by Bruno Walter, 1945

The four movements are arranged in the traditional symphonic form of the Classical era:

1. Allegro vivace,
2. Andante cantabile, 3/4 in F major
3. Menuetto: Allegretto – Trio, 3/4
4. Molto allegro,

The symphony typically has a duration of about 33 minutes.

=== I. Allegro vivace ===
The opening movement is in sonata form. Its main theme begins with contrasting motifs: a threefold tutti outburst on the fundamental tone (respectively, by an ascending motion leading in a triplet from the dominant tone underneath to the fundamental one), followed by a more lyrical response.

This exchange is heard twice and then followed by an extended series of fanfares. What follows is a transitional passage where the two contrasting motifs are expanded and developed. From there, the second theme group begins with a lyrical section in G major which ends suspended on a seventh chord and is followed by a stormy section in C minor. Following a full stop, the expositional coda begins which quotes Mozart's insertion aria "Un bacio di mano", K. 541 and then ends the exposition on a series of fanfares.

The development begins with a modulation from G major to E♭ major where the insertion-aria theme is then repeated and extensively developed. A false recapitulation then occurs where the movement's opening theme returns but softly and in F major. The first theme group's final flourishes then are extensively developed against a chromatically falling bass followed by a restatement of the end of the insertion aria then leading to C major for the true recapitulation. With the exception of the usual key transpositions and some expansion of the minor key sections, the recapitulation proceeds in a regular fashion.

=== II. Andante cantabile ===
The second movement, also in sonata form, is a sarabande of the French type in F major (the subdominant key of C major) similar to those found in the keyboard suites of J. S. Bach. This is the only symphonic slow movement of Mozart's to bear the indication cantabile. The opening melody, played by muted violins, is never allowed to conclude without interruption. After a development section, the recapitulation begins in the subdominant key of B♭ major, though a secondary development section disrupts the recapitulation with rhythmic figures before the return to F.

=== III. Menuetto: Allegretto – Trio ===
The third movement, a menuetto marked "allegretto", is similar to a Ländler, a popular Austrian folk dance form. Midway through the movement, there is a chromatic progression in which sparse imitative textures are presented by the woodwinds (bars 43–51) before the full orchestra returns. In the trio section of the movement, the four-note figure that will form the main theme of the last movement (C–D–F–E) appears prominently (bars 9–12 of the Trio), but on the seventh degree of the A minor scale (G♯–A–C–B), giving it a very different character.

=== IV. Molto allegro ===
The last movement is in sonata form. The main theme consists of the first four notes above. Four more themes are introduced in the course of the movement. Mozart develops these themes individually or in combination, as seen in the interplay between the woodwinds in the example below. These five themes are combined in the fugato at the end of the movement.

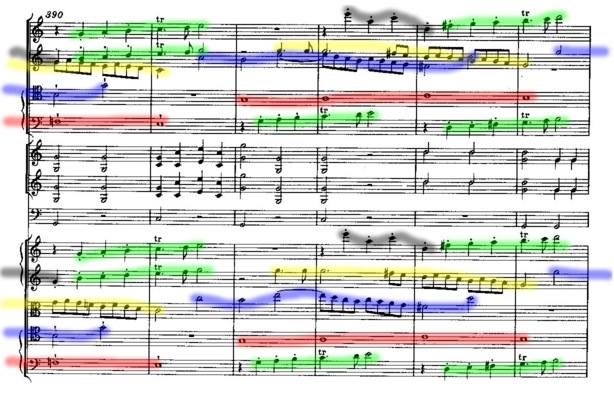

In an article about the symphony, Sir George Grove wrote that "it is for the finale that Mozart has reserved all the resources of his science, and all the power, which no one seems to have possessed to the same degree with himself, of concealing that science, and making it the vehicle for music as pleasing as it is learned. Nowhere has he achieved more." Of the piece as a whole, he wrote that "It is the greatest orchestral work of the world which preceded the French Revolution."

The four-note theme is a common plainchant motif which can be traced back at least as far as Thomas Aquinas's "Pange lingua gloriosi corporis mysterium" from the 13th century. Mozart often used it; it makes a brief appearance as early as his Symphony No. 1 in 1764. Later, he used it in the Credo of an early Missa Brevis in F major, the first movement of his Symphony No. 33 and trio of the minuet of this symphony. It also appears at bar 105 in the first movement of the Violin Sonata No. 33 where it is used as the fresh thematic material that forms the basis for the development section, making a final appearance in the movement's coda.

Scholars are certain Mozart studied Michael Haydn's Symphony No. 28 in C major, which also has a fugato in its finale and whose coda he very closely paraphrases for his own coda. Charles Sherman speculates that Mozart also studied Michael Haydn's Symphony No. 23 in D major because he "often requested his father Leopold to send him the latest fugue that Haydn had written". The Michael Haydn Symphony No. 39, written only a few weeks before Mozart's, also has a fugato in the finale, the theme of which begins with two whole notes. Sherman has pointed out other similarities between the two almost perfectly contemporaneous works. The four-note motif is also the main theme of the contrapuntal finale of Michael's elder brother Joseph's Symphony No. 13 in D major (1764).

== Origin of the nickname ==
According to the composer's younger son Franz Xaver Wolfgang Mozart, the symphony was given the name Jupiter by Johann Peter Salomon, who had settled in London in around 1781. The name has also been attributed to Johann Baptist Cramer, an English music publisher. Reportedly, from the first chords, Mozart's Symphony No. 41 reminded Cramer of Jupiter and his thunderbolts.

The Bath Journal of Monday, 19 April 1813, carried an advertisement for a concert to be given in the Bath Assembly Rooms on Easter Wednesday, 21 April, to include "Grand Sinfonia (Jupiter). Mozart". A symphony by Mozart of this name also appeared in the 22 April 1813 issue of The Morning Chronicle in a report on the third concert of the Royal Philharmonic Society on 19 April. The 3 June 1817 issue of The Morning Post carried an advertisement for printed music that includes: "The celebrated movement from Mozart's sympathy [sic], called 'Jupiter', arranged as a Duet, by J. Wilkins, 4s. [4 shillings]".

== Responses and reception ==
In her book Mozart: The 'Jupiter' Symphony, musicologist Elaine Sisman noted that the majority of responses ranged "from admiring to adulatory, a gamut from A to A".

The symphony has been praised by critics, theorists, composers and biographers. It has come to be viewed as a canonized masterwork both for its brilliant use of counterpoint that never obscures the work's clarity. Sisman quotes these reviews:

- E. L. Gerber in Neues Historisch-biographisches Lexicon der Tonkünstler (1812–1814): "...overpoweringly great, fiery, artistic, pathetic, sublime, Symphony in C ... we would already have to perceive him as one of the first[-ranked] geniuses of modern times and the century just past".
- A review in the Allgemeine musikalische Zeitung (1846): "How pure and clear are all the images within! No more and no less than that which each requires according to its nature. ... Here is revealed how the master first collects his material separately, then explores how everything can proceed from it, and finally builds and elaborates upon it. That even Beethoven worked this way is revealed in his sketchbooks".
- In 1896, Johannes Brahms remarked: "I am able to understand too that Beethoven's first symphony did impress people colossally. But the last three symphonies by Mozart are much more important. Some people are beginning to feel that now".

== First recording ==
The symphony's oldest recording dates to around the beginning of World War I. It was issued by the Victor Talking Machine Company in its black label series, making it one of the first symphonies to be recorded using the acoustic recording technology.

The record labels list the Victor Concert Orchestra as the performers; they omit the conductor, who according to company ledgers was Walter B. Rogers.

The music was heavily abridged and issued on two records: 10-inch 17707 and 12-inch 35430. Victor published two widely separated takes of each of the first two movements under the same catalogue numbers. The distribution, recording dates, and approximate timings were as follows (data from corresponding matrix pages in the Discography of American Historical Recordings as indicated and physical copies of the records):

- 1st movement (17707-A, 10"), 5 August 1913 (if take 1) or 27 January 1915 (if take 6), 2:45
- 2nd movement (35430-A, 12"), 5 August 1913 (if take 1) or 18 January 1915 (if take 7), 3:32
- 3rd movement (17707-B, 10"), 22 December 1914, 2:40
- 4th movement (35430-B, 12"), 22 December 1914, 3:41
