= Das Traumbild =

1787 art song by W. A. Mozart

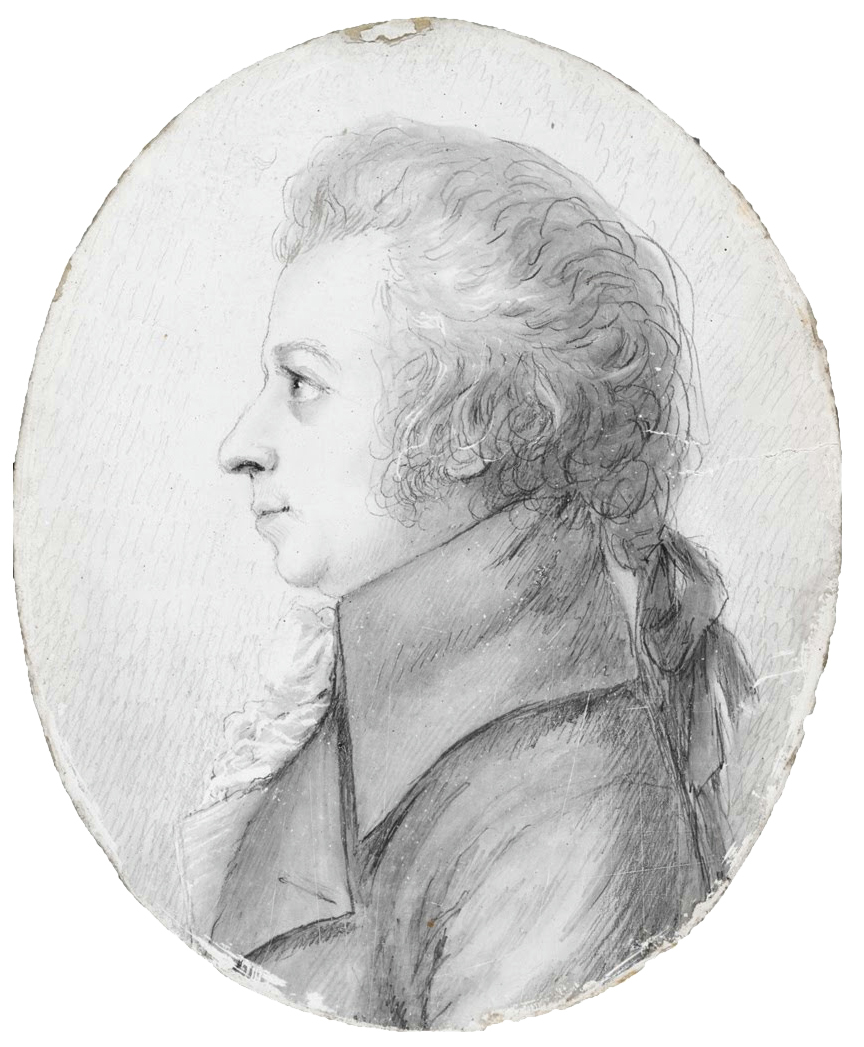
Dora Stock's 1789 miniature of Mozart

"Das Traumbild" ("The Dream Song"), K. 530, is an art song, or Lied, for piano and voice by Wolfgang Amadeus Mozart to a poem by Ludwig Hölty.

== History ==
Mozart wrote the song on 6 November 1787 in Prague where here prepared the premiere of his opera Don Giovanni. He sent the song by mail on 9 November to his friend and occasional composer Gottfried von Jacquin, who had it copied – with Mozart's knowledge – into a songbook of six songs under his own attribution. Four of the songs were indeed by Jacquin, Mozart's other contribution to this collection was "Als Luise die Briefe ihres ungetreuen Liebhabers verbrannte", K. 520.

Emil Gottfried Edler von Jacquin was a son of Nikolaus Joseph von Jacquin and younger brother of Joseph Franz von Jacquin. Nikolaus and Mozart often gave house concerts together where Nikolaus played the flute. Gottfried also had a younger sister, Franziska (9 October 1769 – 12 August 1850) who received piano lesson from Mozart. Mozart dedicated a considerable number of his works to the Jacquin family, notably the Kegelstatt Trio. This was first played at the Jacquins' house in August 1786 with Mozart playing the viola, Anton Stadler the clarinet, and Franziska the piano.

Gottfried von Jacquin added different dedications to each of the six songs, and had his booklet published in Vienna by Laurenz Lausch in 1791; he died the following year, 25 years old. His family had it published again as part of his estate in about 1803 by Johann Cappi. Jacquin dedicated this song to Marianne von Natorp, sister of Joseph Franz von Jaquin's wife, Babette; both the Natorp sisters were also the dedicatees of Mozart's Sonata in C major for piano four-hands, K. 521, composed earlier in 1787. Mozart indicates in a letter from 4 November 1787 that this song may have improved Marianne Natorp's affection towards Jacquin.

Constanze Mozart offered both songs, K. 520 and K. 530, in 1799 to Breitkopf & Härtel for publication. The work was unknown to Ludwig von Köchel and is not catalogued in the first Köchel catalogue.

It was published in English by Broderip & Wilkinson in London in c. 1800 under the title "The Exile".

== The poem ==
Wo bist du, Bild, das vor mir stand,
als ich im Garten träumte,
ins Haar den Rosmarin mir wand,
der um mein Lager keimte?
Wo bist du, Bild, das vor mir stand,
mir in die Seele blickte,
und eine warme Mädchenhand
mir an die Wangen drückte?

Nun such' ich dich, mit Harm erfüllt,
Bald bei des Dorfes Linden,
Bald in der Stadt, geliebtes Bild,
Und kann dich nirgends finden.
Nach jedem Fenster blick' ich hin,
Wo nur ein Schleier wehet,
Und habe meine Lieblingin
Noch nirgends ausgespähet.

Komm selber, süßes Bild der Nacht,
Komm mit den Engelsmienen,
Und in der leichten Schäfertracht,
Worin du mir erschienen!
Bring' mit die schwanenweiße Hand,
Die mir das Herz gestohlen,
Das purpurrote Busenband,
Das Sträußchen von Violen.

Dein großes blaues Augenpaar,
Woraus ein Engel blickte;
Die Stirne, die so freundlich war,
Und guten Abend nickte;
Den Mund, der Liebe Paradies,
Die kleinen Wangengrübchen,
Wo sich der Himmel offen wies:
Bring' alles mit, mein Liebchen!

Where are you, vision, that stood before me
as I was dreaming in the garden,
winding rosemary into my hair,
that sprouted near my bed?
Where are you, vision, that stood before me,
who gazed into my soul,
and a maiden's warm hand
pressed against my cheeks?

Now I search for you, full of pain,
now by the village linden tree,
now in the town, beloved image,
and cannot find you anywhere.
At every window do I stare
where just a veil might flutter,
and have my dear darling
not espied anywhere.

Come you, sweet image of the night,
come with angelic mien,
and in that light shephard's costume,
in which you appeared to me!
And bring that swan-white hand,
that has my heart stolen,
that purple-red bodice ribbon,
that bunch of violets.

Your pair of large blue eyes,
from which an angel gazed;
the brow that was so kind,
and nodded good evening;
the mouth, that paradise of love,
the little dimples in your cheeks,
where open heaven did appear:
bring all of it, my love!

Ludwig Hölty wrote the poem "An ein Traummädchen" (To a Dream Girl) in 1771. It was first published in the Göttinger Musenalmanach of 1775 under the title "Das Traumbild". This text was used by Franz Schubert in 1815, D. 204A, but that music is lost. However, the version Mozart used is very different, following the publication of a collection of Hölty's poems by Friedrich Leopold zu Stolberg-Stolberg and Johann Heinrich Voß in 1783.

Each of the four stanzas consists of eight lines as a pair of two ballad metre four-line segments, each consisting of a iambic tetrameter followed by a iambic trimeter with feminine rhyme of ABAB–ACAC.

== The music ==
The song is written in the time signature of 6/8 and in the key signature of E-flat major, the key that Mozart used for the Countess in The Marriage of Figaro. The tempo instruction is ruhig (quiet), equivalent to andante. The vocal range is mainly from E-flat_{4} to F_{5}, with one G_{5}–A-flat_{5} figure.

The song begins with a two-bar piano introduction. The first four lines of each stanza take four bars, followed by a two-bar interlude, and four bars for the next four lines. A postlude, based on the theme from the interlude, then leads into the next stanza.

The structure is not through-composed but strophic (all four verses are identical). The text and the music leave it undecided whether the vision can ever be found. Amanda Glauert suggests that, compared other Lieder by Mozart, especially to "Das Veilchen", K. 476, "Das Lied der Trennung", K. 519, "Abendempfindung", K. 523, and "Als Luise die Briefe ihres ungetreuen Liebhabers verbrannte", K. 520, "Das Traumbild" lacks responsiveness to the text and melodic tautness.

A performance of all four stanzas takes between five and six minutes, but some recordings consist only of one, two or three stanzas.
