= Liebes Manndel, wo ist's Bandel? =

Terzet composed by Mozart

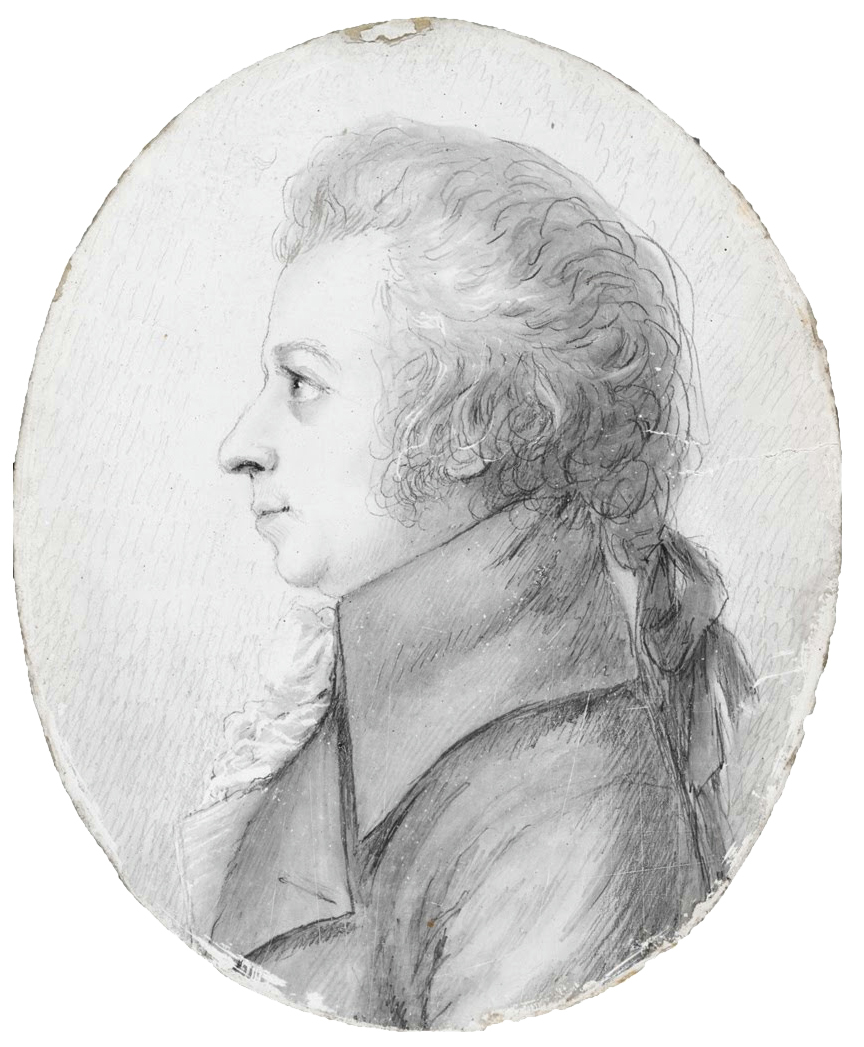
Stock's 1789 miniature of Mozart

"Liebes Manndel, wo ist's Bandel?" ("Dearest husband, where's my hatband?"), otherwise known as "Das Bandel" is a terzet (song for three voices) with string accompaniment composed by Wolfgang Amadeus Mozart, K. 441, with lyrics in the Viennese dialect. The vocal parts are designated as Constanze (soprano), Mozart (tenor) and Jacquin (bass).

The piece is humorous and light-hearted and owes its existence to an incident in which Constanze lost the ribbon for her hat. Gottfried von Jacquin, a friend, arrives and finds it. All three celebrate together. It was long believed to have been written in 1783, however Alan Tyson determined that the autograph is copied on a very rare type of paper that was used by Mozart only in the year 1786. Tyson noted that a number of small-scale pieces not included in Mozart's own catalog of compositions (begun in February 1784) were believed to have been written before it was started, whereas they may simply have been considered too inconsequential for Mozart to record. In a letter from Prague of 15 January 1787, Mozart mentioned a performance of the terzet with some of his friends at the palace in which he was staying. Naturally, it makes more sense to imagine it being performed in Prague as a piece recently composed rather than a piece that was nearly four years old.
