= Die Alte (song) =

1787 art song by W. A. Mozart

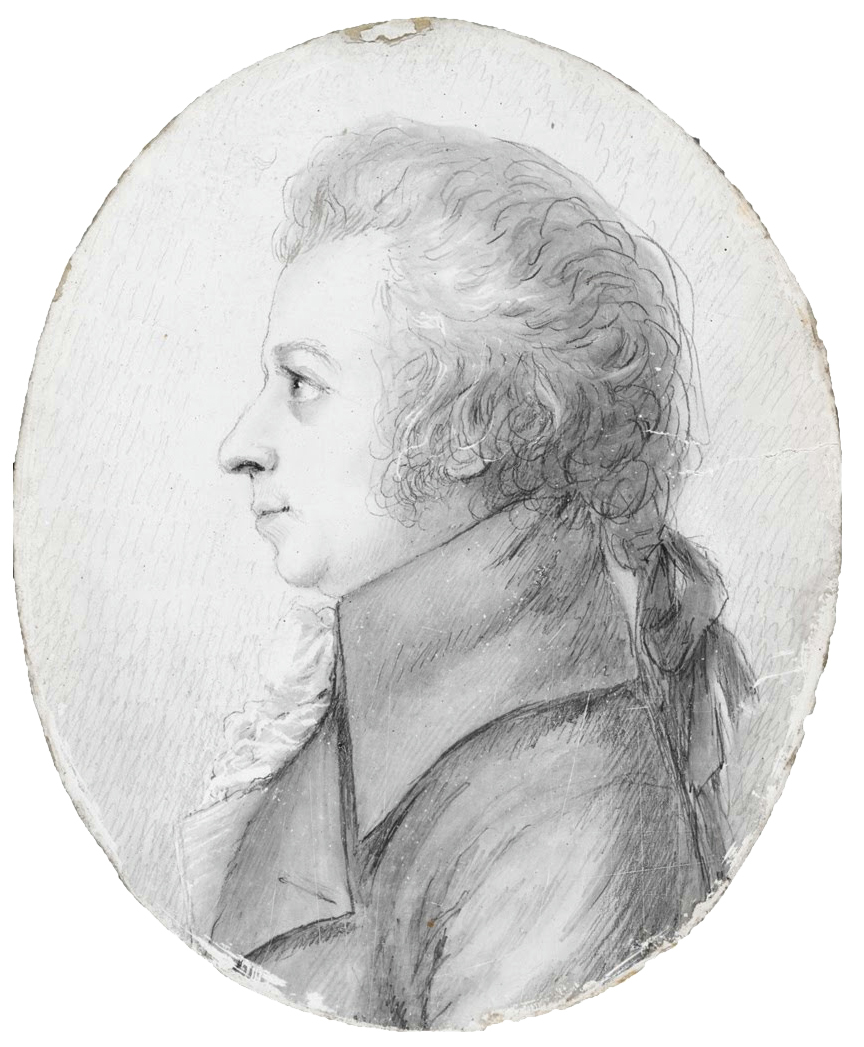
Dora Stock's 1789 miniature of Mozart

"Die Alte" ("The Old Woman"), K. 517, is an art song for voice and piano by Wolfgang Amadeus Mozart to a poem by Friedrich von Hagedorn.

== History ==
The work was completed in Vienna on 18 May 1787, at the same time as the demanding string quintets K. 515 and K. 516. The song features a dramatic musical portrait of an old woman reminiscing of the good old days. The Great Comet of 1744 is mentioned in the lyrics. Mozart found the text in the composer Anton Steffan's Sammlung Deutscher Lieder, nr. 24 in part 2, Vienna 1779; Hagedorn's second verse was not present in this version.

== Music ==
The song is written in the key of E minor, a key rarely used by Mozart, with a time signature of 2/4. The text is set in strophic form to 24 bars. The vocal range reaches from B_{3} to E_{5} with a tessitura from E_{4} to D_{5}.

A performance lasts between three-and-a-half and four-and-a-half minutes.

== Lyrics ==
Zu meiner Zeit, zu meiner Zeit
Bestand noch Recht und Billigkeit.
Da wurden auch aus Kindern Leute,
Aus tugendhaften Mädchen Bräute;
Doch alles mit Bescheidenheit.
O gute Zeit, o gute Zeit!
Es ward kein Jüngling zum Verräter,
Und unsre Jungfern freiten später,
Sie reizten nicht der Mütter Neid.
O gute, Zeit, o gute Zeit!

Zu meiner Zeit, zu meiner Zeit
Befliß man sich der Heimlichkeit.
Genoß der Jüngling ein Vergnügen,
So war er dankbar und verschwiegen;
Doch jetzt entdeckt er's ungescheut.
O schlimme Zeit, o schlimme Zeit!
Die Regung mütterlicher Triebe,
Der Vorwitz und der Geist der Liebe
Fährt jetzt oft schon in's Flügelkleid.
O schlimme Zeit, o schlimme Zeit!

Zu meiner Zeit, zu meiner Zeit
ward Pflicht und Ordnung nicht entweiht.
Der Mann ward, wie es sich gebühret,
Von einer lieben Frau regieret,
Trotz seiner stolzen Männlichkeit.
O gute Zeit, o gute Zeit!
Die Fromme herrschte nur gelinder,
Uns blieb der Hut und ihm die Kinder;
Das war die Mode weit und breit.
O gute Zeit, o gute Zeit!

Zu meiner Zeit, zu meiner Zeit
war noch in Ehen Einigkeit.
Jetzt darf der Mann uns fast gebieten,
Uns widersprechen und uns hüten,
Wo man mit Freunden sich erfreut.
O schlimme Zeit, o schlimme Zeit!
Mit dieser Neuerung im Lande,
Mit diesem Fluch im Ehestande
Hat ein Komet uns längst bedräut.
O schlimme Zeit, o schlimme Zeit!

In my day, in my day
there was law and equity
children grew to become good citizens
and virtuous girls became brides;
but everything in modesty.
O good old days, o good old days!
No young man became unfaithful,
and our maidens married later,
they didn't irritate their mothers.
O good old days, o good old days!

In my day, in my day
we went about our private business
When young folk were enjoying themselves
They were grateful and discreet;
but now they reveal all, unafraid.
O bad times, o bad times!
The sentiment of motherly urges,
the cheekiness and the spirit of love
can be seen in young babes.
O bad times, o bad times!

In my day, in my day
duties and order were accepted.
The husband was, as is proper,
governed by a beloved wife,
despite his proud manliness.
O good old days, o good old days!
The pious wife ruled gently,
we kept our hats, and they the children;
this used to be a widespread custom.
O good old days, o good old days!

In my day, in my day
there was agreement in the bond of matrimony.
Now the husband has command over us,
contradicts us and is critical
when we have pleasure with friends.
O bad times, o bad times!
With this new behaviour in our land,
and this curse upon married life
a comet has threatened us for a long time.
O bad times, o bad times!
