= Non piu, tutto ascoltai =

Concert aria for soprano and orchestra by Wolfgang Amadeus Mozart

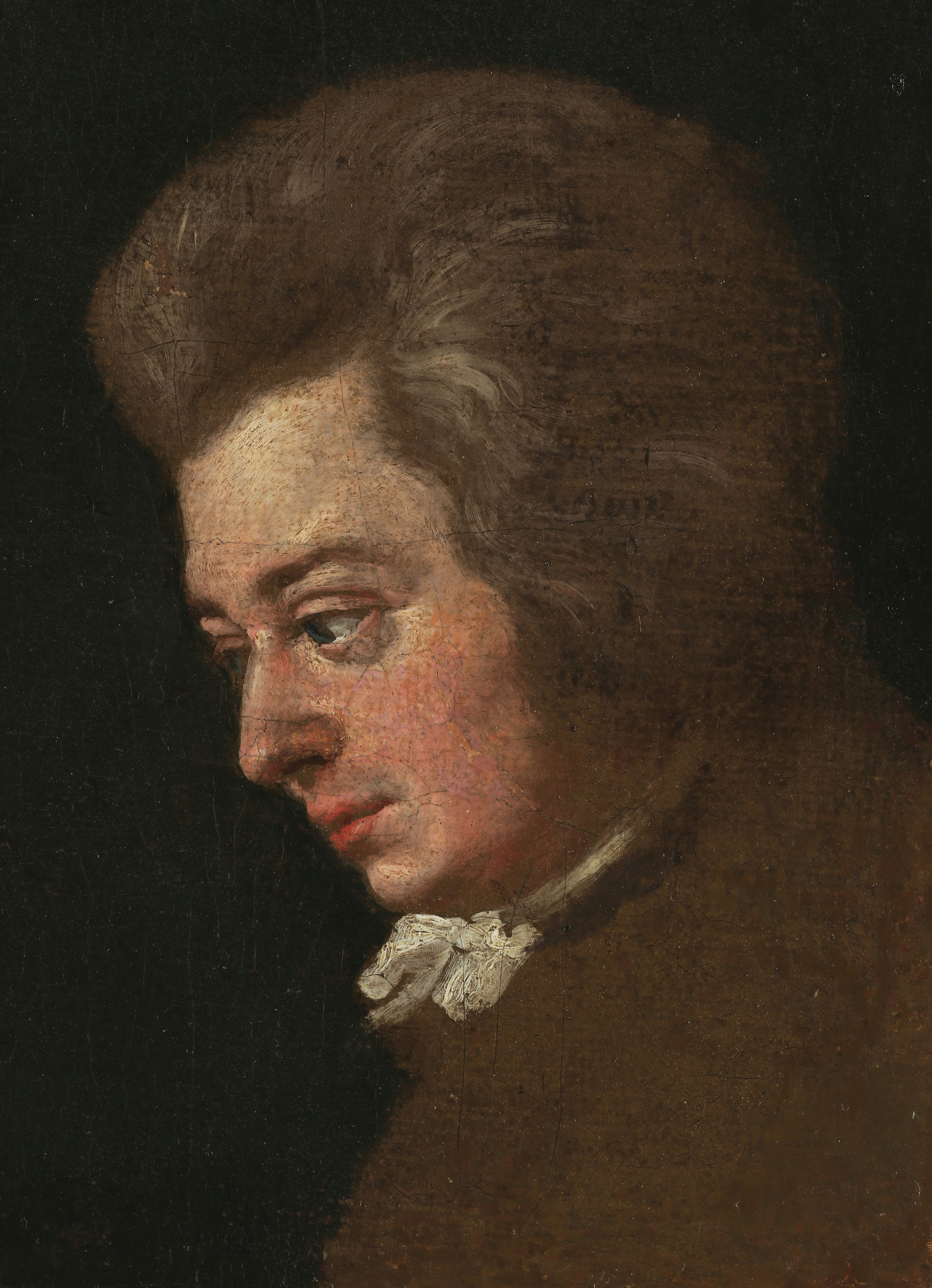
Detail of Lange's 1782–83 Mozart portrait

"Non più. Tutto ascoltai...Non temer, amato bene", K. 490, is a concert aria by Wolfgang Amadeus Mozart for solo tenor and orchestra, composed in Vienna in 1786. Originally written for the tenor voice, the aria is mostly now performed by sopranos. The text of this aria is taken from Mozart's 1781 opera Idomeneo, by Giambattista Varesco. The aria was published by Breitkopf & Härtel in 1881.

== Description ==
The recitative "Non più. Tutto ascoltai" (No more! I have heard all) begins in allegro tempo in the key of C major. The aria commences at bar 52, marked "Rondo – Andante" in B-flat major, introduced by the solo violin, which accompanies the singer to the finale at bar 172. Both are in common time and written in the treble clef. The orchestra consists of two clarinets, two bassoons, two natural horns, a solo violin and a string section. A typical performance takes around ten minutes.

The characters are Ilia, princess of Troy and her beloved Idamante, prince of Crete. (Idamante was a castrato soprano in the original Idomeneo, but here a tenor.) Ilia begs Idamante to forget her and choose Elektra for his bride, but Idamante romantically refuses this request, stating he would die of grief if this occurred. In concert performances, both parts are usually sung by the same recitalist.

== History ==
A concert performance of Idomeneo was given at the Palais Auersperg in Vienna mostly by aristocratic amateur players in March 1786. Two new pieces were added to the 1781 opera, more suited to such a concert performance rather than a full opera production. "Non piu. Tutto ascoltai" was inserted as the new beginning of the second act and was sung by the tenor Baron Pulini. The solo violin accompaniment was played by Mozart's friend, Count August Hatzfeld from the House of Hatzfeld.

The solo violin part was described as "ravishingly beautiful" by the scholar H. C. Robbins Landon, who also declared the aria "the equal of anything of in The Marriage of Figaro" on which Mozart was working at the time. Other performers included Countess Hortense Hatzfeld, nee Comtesse Zierotin (the wife of August's half-brother, Clemens), as Elettra, and Giuseppe Antonio Bridi from Rovereto as Idomeneo.

== Text ==
Ilia:
Non più. Tutto ascoltai, tutto compresi.
D'Elettra e d'Idamante noti sono gli amori,
al caro impegno omai mancar non dei,
va, scordati di me, donati a lei.

Idamante:
Ch'io mi scordi di te? Che a lei mi doni
Puoi consigliarmi?
E puoi voler ch'io viva?

Ilia:
Non congiurar, mia vita,
Contro la mia costanza!
Il colpo atroce mi distrugge abbastanza!

Idamante:
Ah no, sarebbe il viver mio di morte
Assai peggior! Fosti il mio primo amore,
E l'ultimo sarai. Venga la morte!
Intrepido l'attendo, ma ch'io possa
Struggermi ad altra face, ad altr'oggetto
Donar gl'affetti miei,
Come tentarlo? Ah! di dolor morrei!

Non temer, amato bene,
Per te sempre il cor sarà.
Più non reggo a tante pene,
L'alma mia mancando va.
Tu sospiri? o duol funesto!
Pensa almen, che istante è questo!
Non mi posso, oh Dio! spiegar.
Stelle barbare, stelle spietate,
Perché mai tanto rigor?
Alme belle, che vedete
Le mie pene in tal momento,
Dite voi, s'egual tormento
Può soffrir un fido cor!

No more, I have heard and understood everything.
Electra and Idamante's bond is well known.
You must not betray the sweet commitment any longer.
Go, forget me, give yourself to her.

You wish that I should forget you?
And give myself to her?
Then you expect me to live?

My beloved
Do not attempt to shake my firm resolve
This dreadful blow has given me too much grief!

Ah no! My life would be far worse than death!
You were my first love and shall be the last.
Let death come, I await it fearlessly.
But how could I attempt
to warm myself at another flame,
to lavish my affections on another?
Ah! I would die of grief!

Fear nothing, my beloved,
my heart will always be yours.
I can no longer suffer such distress,
my spirit begins to fail me.
You sigh? O mournful sorrow!
Just think what a moment this is!
O God! I cannot express myself.
Barbarous stars, pitiless stars,
why ever are you so stern?
Fair souls who see
my sufferings at such a moment,
tell me if a faithful heart
can suffer such torment?
