= Friedrich von Hagedorn =

German poet (1708–1754)

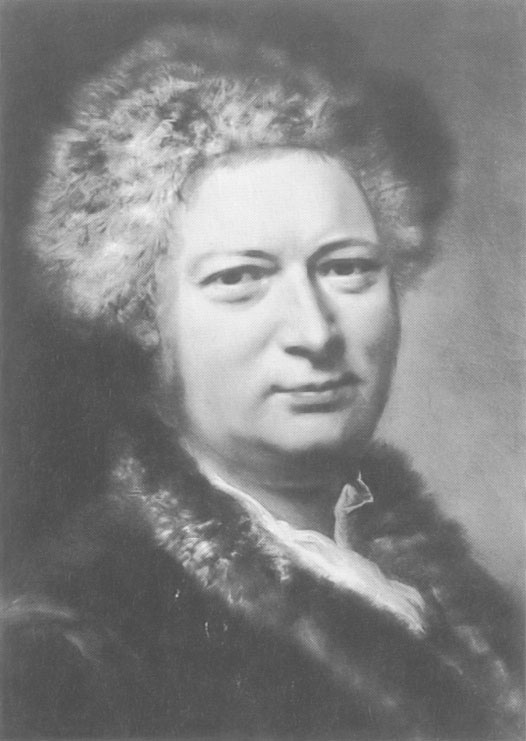
Friedrich von Hagedorn; portrait by Dominicus van der Smissen (1741)

Friedrich von Hagedorn (23 April 1708 – 28 October 1754) was a German Rococo poet. He was born in Hamburg, where his father, a man of scientific and literary taste, was the Danish ambassador. His younger brother, Christian Ludwig, was a well known art historian and collector.

== Biography ==
=== Life ===
He was educated at the Gymnasium of Hamburg and in 1726 became a student of law at the University of Jena. Returning to Hamburg in 1729, he obtained the appointment of unpaid private secretary to the Danish ambassador in London, where he lived until 1731. Hagedorn's return to Hamburg was followed by a period of great poverty and hardship but, in 1733, he was appointed secretary to the so-called "English Court" (Englischer Hof) in Hamburg, a trading company founded in the 13th century. He shortly afterwards married, and from this time had sufficient leisure to pursue his literary occupations until his death.

=== Career ===
The first collection of Hagedorn's poems was published at Hamburg shortly after his return from Jena in 1729, under the title Versuch einiger Gedichte (reprinted by A. Sauer, Heilbronn, 1883). Versuch in poetischen Fabeln und Erzählungen appeared in 1738 a collection of his lyric poems, under the title Sammlung neuer Oden und Lieder in 1742 and his Moralische Gedichte in 1750. A collection of his entire works was published at Hamburg in 1757 after his death. The best is J.J. Eschenburg's edition (5 vols., Hamburg, 1800). Selections of his poetry with an excellent introduction appear in F. Muncker's Anakreontiker und preussisch-patriotische Lyriker (Stuttgart, 1894).

Mozart set his poem Die Alte (The Old Woman) to music in his song of the same name (K. 517) in 1787. Joseph Haydn used two of his poems in his canons (a capella songs) (Hob. XXVIIb).
