= Als Luise die Briefe ihres ungetreuen Liebhabers verbrannte =

1787 art song by W. A. Mozart

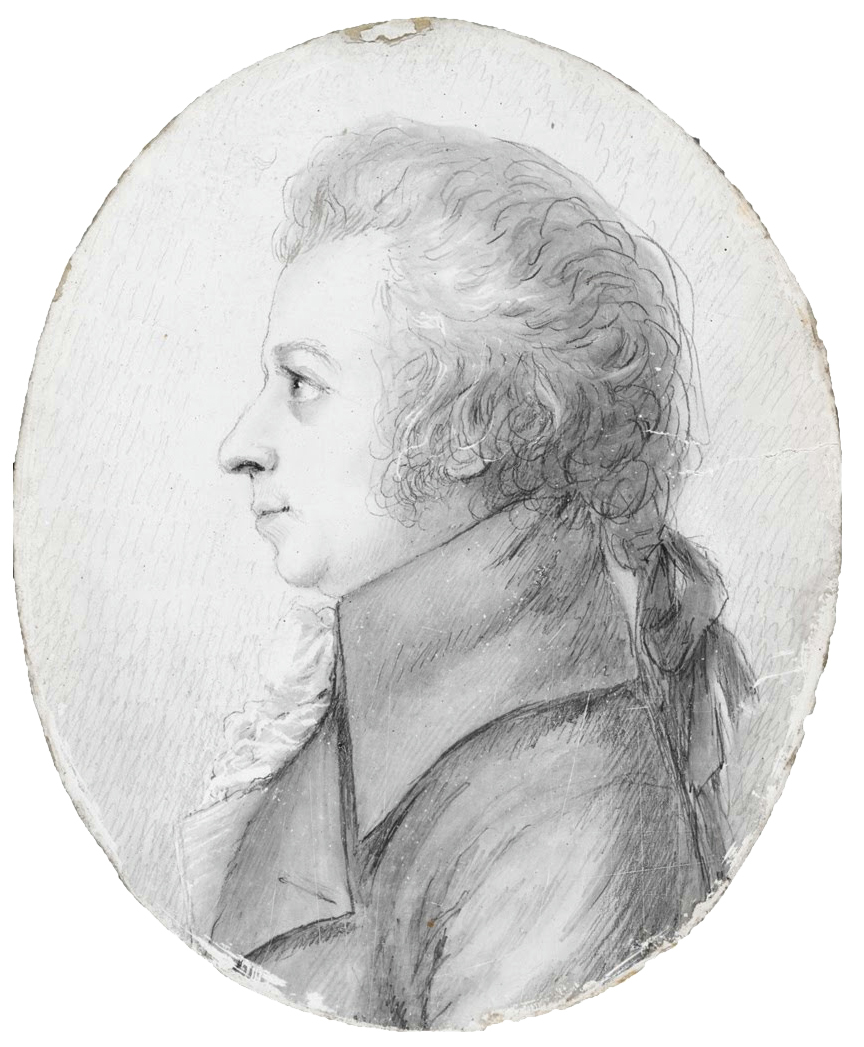
Dora Stock's 1789 miniature of Mozart

"Als Luise die Briefe ihres ungetreuen Liebhabers verbrannte" ("As Luise Was Burning the Letters of Her Unfaithful Lover" (Note: The title is usually translated into English as "When Luise Burnt the Letters of Her Unfaithful Lover"; however, from the text of the poem, the translation "As Luise Was Burning the Letters of Her Unfaithful Lover" seems more fitting.)), K. 520, is an art song for piano and voice (soprano) by Wolfgang Amadeus Mozart to a poem by Gabriele von Baumberg.

== History ==
Mozart wrote the piece on 26 May 1787, (Note: Mozart's father, Leopold, died two days later.) when he had just started to write Don Giovanni, in the Vienna district of Landstraße in the room of his friend and occasional composer Gottfried von Jacquin (1767–1792), who was then 21 years old. It is set to words of the poet Gabriele von Baumberg (1768–1839), an acquaintance of Mozart and Jacquin. In fact, Mozart wrote this piece for Jacquin's use, who had it copied – with Mozart's knowledge – into a songbook of six songs under his own attribution; the four other songs were by Jacquin. Mozart's other contribution for this songbook was "Das Traumbild", K. 530, which Mozart posted to Jacquin later that year from Prague where he prepared Don Giovanni.

Emil Gottfried Edler von Jacquin was a son of Nikolaus Joseph von Jacquin and younger brother of Joseph Franz von Jacquin. Nikolaus and Mozart often gave house concerts together where Nikolaus played the flute. Gottfried also had a younger sister, Franziska (9 October 1769 – 12 August 1850) who received piano lesson from Mozart. In a letter to Gottfried from 15 January 1787 he praises her studiousness and diligence. Mozart dedicated a considerable number of his works to the Jacquin family, notably the Kegelstatt Trio. This was first played at the Jacquins' house in August 1786 with Mozart playing the viola, Anton Stadler the clarinet, and Franziska the piano.

Gottfried von Jacquin added different dedications to each of the six songs, and had his booklet published in Vienna by Laurenz Lausch in 1791; he died the following year, 25 years old. His family had it published again as part of his estate in about 1803 by Johann Cappi. Jacquin's dedication for this work (K. 520) was Dem Fräulein von Altomonte. Sybille Dahms believes this to be the contralto singer Katharina von Altomonte who sang – alongside Mozart's sister-in-law and former love interest Maria Aloysia Lange, the "incomparable" (Joseph II) tenor Valentin Adamberger, and the bass Ignaz Saal – in the March 1789 performance of Handel's Messiah in Mozart's orchestration. Katharina von Altomonte was presumably related to the painter Bartolomeo Altomonte (1694–1783) who was famous for his painted ceilings in many Austrian churches.

On 27 March 1799 Constanze Mozart wrote to the publishers Breitkopf & Härtel:

In considering the above songs I must state for your and the public's benefit that the two: "Erzeugt von heisser Phantasie" [K520] and "Wo bist du, bild etc" [K530] did pass here, and thus most likely also in other places, for the work of the here deceased Emil Gotfried Edler v. Jacquin, a close friend of my husband. However, the original score shows that it is from my husband himself; on one of them [K520] it is even written in his own hand that it was made in Jacquin's home at the Landstraße (a suburb here)." Subsequently, K. 520 was first published under Mozart's name in the 1799 Breitkopf & Härtel Œuvres, where it was titled by the publishers "Unglückliche Liebe" ("Unhappy Love").

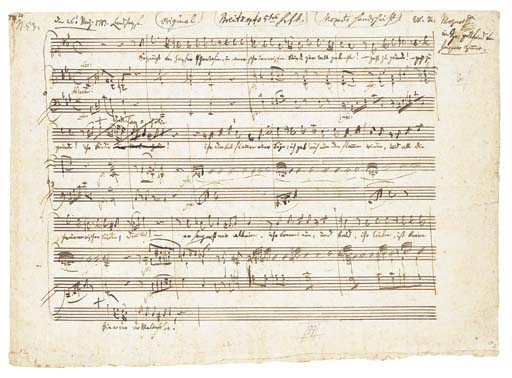
Page 1 of 2 of the autograph

After Constanze sold the autograph as part of a large collection to the Kapellmeister Johann Anton André, it passed on to his son Johann August André. It came then to the Austrian ambassador in Berlin, Count György Esterházy (1809–1856) and was later purchased by Louisa Emily Charlotte, Lady Revelstoke, wife of Edward Baring, 1st Baron Revelstoke; at her death in 1892 it fell to her second daughter, Margaret, wife of Charles Spencer, 6th Earl Spencer. It remained in the Spencer family until it was put up for sale on 16 October 1985 as lot 146 at Christie's, London, when a Janez Mercun in Geneva acquired it. It came up for auction again at Christie's on 3 December 2003 where it was sold for £251,650 (then US$435,355).

== The poem ==
Though famous in her time as "the German Sappho" and praised by Goethe, not much of Gabriele von Baumberg's work is notable today, but Franz Schubert set six of her poems (Note: Schubert's six songs to poems by Baumberg are: "Lebenstraum" (D. 39) (a rather unsuccessful attempt by Schubert); "Lob des Tokayers" (D. 248); "Cora an die Sonne" (D. 263); "Der Morgenkuss" (D. 264); "Abendständchen – An Lina" (D. 265); "An die Sonne" (D. 270). All these have been described by Fischer-Dieskau in Schubert's Songs (1977) as "mere miniatures of little importance". (Harry Peter Clive: Schubert and His World, Oxford University Press 1997, p. 9, ISBN 978-0-19-816582-8)) to music. Baumberg was born on 25 March 1768 in Linz; she was married to the Hungarian radical liberation poet János Batsányi; she died on 24 July 1839 in Linz. She wrote this poem probably in 1786 when she was 18 years old, presumably in the wake of a personal experience.

Mozart found the poem in the Wiener Musenalmanch auf das Jahr 1786 (Vienna Almanc of the Muses for the Year 1786).

"Als Luise die Briefe ihres ungetreuen Liebhabers verbrannte"
Performed in 1952 by Janny van Wering (piano), Elisabeth Margano (soprano)

Instrumental version (1:30)
Flute, piano

Erzeugt von heißer Phantasie,
In einer schwärmerischen Stunde
Zur Welt gebrachte, geht zu Grunde,
Ihr Kinder der Melancholie!

Ihr danket Flammen euer Sein,
Ich geb' euch nun den Flammen wieder,
Und all' die schwärmerischen Lieder,
Denn ach! er sang nicht mir allein.

Ihr brennet nun, und bald, ihr Lieben,
Ist keine Spur von euch mehr hier.
Doch ach! der Mann, der euch geschrieben,
Brennt lange noch vielleicht in mir.

You borne of such hot phantasy,
In revelry and so much gushing
Brought to the world, o perish
You offspring from melancholy!

The flames which made you into being,
I give you now back to the flames,
And all those songs of revelry,
Alas! he sang not just for me.

You cherish'd letters, there you burn,
And soon there is no trace of you.
Alas! the man who once has penn'd you,
Will possibly burn long in me.

== The music ==
The song is written in the time signature of common time and in the key signature of C minor; it is 20 bars long. As was usual in that period, Mozart wrote the piece using the soprano clef. (Note: The soprano clef fell soon after out of use in favour of the treble clef, in which it is shown here.) The song contains almost no melismata, (Note: The song's lyrics consist of 84 syllables; 10 are melismatic, 9 of those over 2 notes, 1 over 3.) and several passages provide a considerable element of operatic drama. The arpeggiating rolls in the left hand in bars 6 to 9 illustrate both the burning flames and the singer's fury about the unfaithful lover. This is followed by pauses and chromatic figures to express hesitation and despair. The rising thirty-second notes to "Ihr brennet nun, und bald, ihr Lieben, ist keine Spur von euch mehr hier" (bars 12 to 14) return to the image of licking, rising flames and sparks, before again chromatically falling into doubt about the act just committed and the singer's lingering feelings towards the unfaithful lover.

The musical language in bars 12 to 14 often occurs in Mozart's operas to heighten emotional effect; we find a recitativo-like voice rising over the progression minor dominant→major dominant→3rd inversion of the seventh chord→diminished seventh→major dominant in La finta giardiniera (no. 12 "Numi! che incanto è questo", bars 295–299), Idomeneo (no. 6 "Vedrommi intorno", bars 52–58), Figaro (no. 18 "Hai già vinta la causa!", bars 40–44), and in the Entführung (no. 4 "Konstanze, dich wiederzusehen", bars 34–39); in all these, as well as here, the effect is enforced with sforzando or crescendo dynamics.

Mozart's first attempt for bar 5

The second attempt, slightly changed syllable distribution

Final version

Mozart took three attempts at one particular phrase: "Kinder der Melancholie". See his first attempt on the right. He then crossed out the words and re-arranged them slightly for his second version. Both these versions resulted in undue stresses for the word "Me-lan-cho-lie" (stressed on the 2nd and 4th syllables in German). Finally, he crossed out the whole section and wrote a new version (see right) in some free space at the bottom of the sheet. This now gets the stresses right, and by abandoning the earlier syncopation, it also renders more mournfully.

A further change was the ending, which was originally a simple tonic chord on the last syllable of the vocal line; Mozart crossed out the closing double bar-line emphatically with eight marks and added the little piano postlude which rounds the piece off by echoing the opening figure.

Alfred Einstein wrote:

[The song is] "not really a song at all, but a dramatically conceived scena, in which one not only feels the injured mood of the young lady, in the complaining chromaticism in C minor, but also sees the fire in the hearth – a little masterpiece, at once free and perfectly rounded."
