= Popoli di Tessaglia! =

1779 concert aria by W. A. Mozart

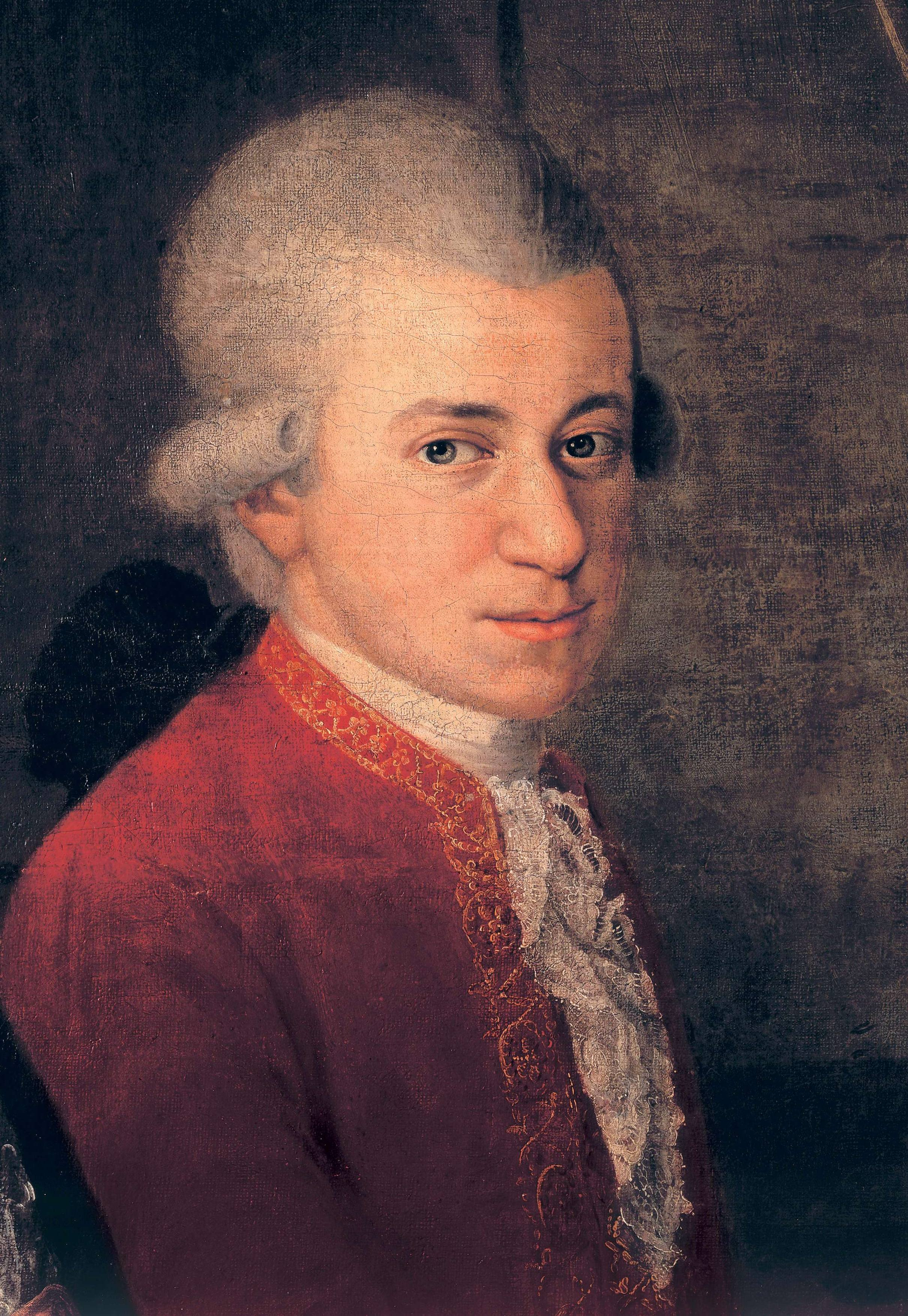
Detail of Wolfgang from the 1780–81 Portrait of the Mozart Family

"Popoli di Tessaglia! – Io non chiedo, eterni Dei" (K. 316/300b) is a recitative and aria for soprano and orchestra that Wolfgang Amadeus Mozart wrote for Aloysia Weber. It is famous for including two occurrences of a G_{6}, i.e. the G in altissimo above high C, or 1568 Hz by modern concert pitch – according to the Guinness Book of Records, the highest musical note ever scored for the human voice. (However, an A_{6} is scored in Ignaz Umlauf's Das Irrlicht, also sung by Aloysia Weber.)

== History ==
Mozart completed this recitative and aria in Munich on 8 January 1779, as an insertion aria in act, scene 2, for the opera Alceste by Christoph Willibald Gluck. It was written specifically to showcase the superlative vocal skills of Mozart's future sister-in-law, Aloysia Weber, who was only 18 at the time. However, sopranos who are able to cope with the aria's demands have been few and far between, and hence the aria is usually omitted from performances of Alceste. It has been therefore redesignated a concert aria, to be presented in concerts by such rare singers as are able to deliver its fiendishly difficult coloratura.

== Music ==
The aria is scored for solo oboe, solo bassoon, 2 horns in C, and strings. The opening recitative is 47 bars long and is in C minor with a time signature of, with the detailed tempo direction Andantino sostenuto e languido. The following aria is 192 bars long and in C major. The aria is divided into two parts: the first part with a time signature of 2/4 and tempo Andantino sostenuto e cantabile, ends in bar 85; the second part then begins, and the tempo then accelerates to Allegro assai to the words of the final four lines. The aria has a vocal range of two octaves and a major second, from F_{4} to G_{6}; the latter note occurs only twice (in bars 165 and 172 of the aria):

== Libretto ==
The text of the aria is from the opera Alceste, and was written by Ranieri de' Calzabigi in traditional forms of Italian poetry; the recitative uses occasionally rhymed endecasillabi (hendecasyllabic) (11 syllables) and settenari (7 syllables) verses. The aria is written in two quatrains, each containing four ottonari (octonary) lines, with a rhyme scheme of A–B–B–C–A–D–D–C where the fourth an eighth lines are oxytones.

Popoli di Tessaglia, ah mai più giusto
fu il vostro pianto; a voi non men che a questi
innocenti fanciulli
Admeto è padre. Io perdo
il caro sposo, e voi
l'amato re. La nostra
sola speranza, il nostro amor c'invola
questo fato crudel; né so chi prima
in sì grave sciagura
a compianger m'appigli
del regno, di me stessa, o de' miei figli.
La pietà degli dei sola ci resta
a implorare, a ottener; verrò compagna
alle vostre preghiere,
a' vostri sacrifizi: avanti all'are
una misera madre,
due bambini infelici,
tutto un popolo in pianto
presenterò così. Forse con questo
spettacolo funesto, in cui dolente
gli affetti, i voti suoi dichiara un regno,
placato alfin sarà del ciel lo sdegno.

Io non chiedo, eterni Dei
tutto il ciel per me sereno,
ma il mio duol consoli almeno,
qualche raggio di pietà.
Non comprende i mali miei
ne il terror, che m'empie il petto,
chi di moglie il vivo affetto,
chi di madre il cor non hà.

Peoples of Thessaly, ah, your tears
were never more just; to you no less than to these
innocent children
Admetus is a father. I lose
the dear husband, and you
the beloved king. Our
only hope, our love this cruel fate
takes us away, nor do I know who before
in such a grave disaster
to feel sorry for me
of the kingdom, of myself, or of my children.
The mercy of the gods alone
it remains for us to beg, to obtain. I will come as a companion
to your prayers,
to your sacrifices before thee are
a miserable mother,
two unhappy children,
a whole people in tears,
I will present like this. Perhaps with this
fatal sight, in which painful
the affections, his vows declare a kingdom,
at last, there will be no more disdain from heaven.

I don't ask, eternal gods
all the sky for me is clear.
But my grief consoles at least,
some ray of pity.
He does not understand my ills
nor the terror that fills my chest,
who of a wife the keen affection,
who does not have the heart of a mother.
