= Ein deutsches Kriegslied =

1788 concert aria by W. A. Mozart

"Ein deutsches Kriegslied" (A German War Song), K. 539, also known by its first line, "Ich möchte wohl der Kaiser sein" (I would like to be Emperor), is a concert aria by Wolfgang Amadeus Mozart to a poem by Johann Wilhelm Ludwig Gleim. The song is in strophic form and is in the key of A major.

The aria was completed on 5 March 1788. It was first performed at a benefit concert at the Leopoldstädter Theater on 7 March 1788 with comic actor Friedrich Baumann singing. It is written for a bass singer. The instrumentation incorporates instruments that were considered to be of Turkish style, such as piccolo, cymbals and bass drum as the song was in support of the Austro-Turkish War that had broken out that year. Other instruments include 2 oboes, 2 bassoons, 2 natural horns and string section.

The lyrics have the singer describing what he would do if he were the Austrian emperor. In the first verse he sings that he would conquer Constantinople. In the second verse he sings that he would revive the ancient glories of Athens, Sparta and Rome. In the third verse he sings that he would sing praises to the great heroes. And in the fourth and final verse he sings that since the current emperor, Josef II, is doing all these things he is content to let him remain emperor in perpetuity.

According to Interlude critic Georg Predota, the melody of "Ein deutsches Kriegslied" was adapted from a melody Joseph Haydn had used for an aria with the line "Nor does stupidity like to be alone; everything goes better by twos. Listen, my dear people, it’s the same today as it ever was, the world is full of foolishness." By using this melody, Predota suggested that Mozart was actually intending the song to be seen as a satire indicating his opposition to the Astro-Turkish War and the resulting tax.
