= Abendempfindung =

1787 composition by Wolfgang Amadeus Mozart

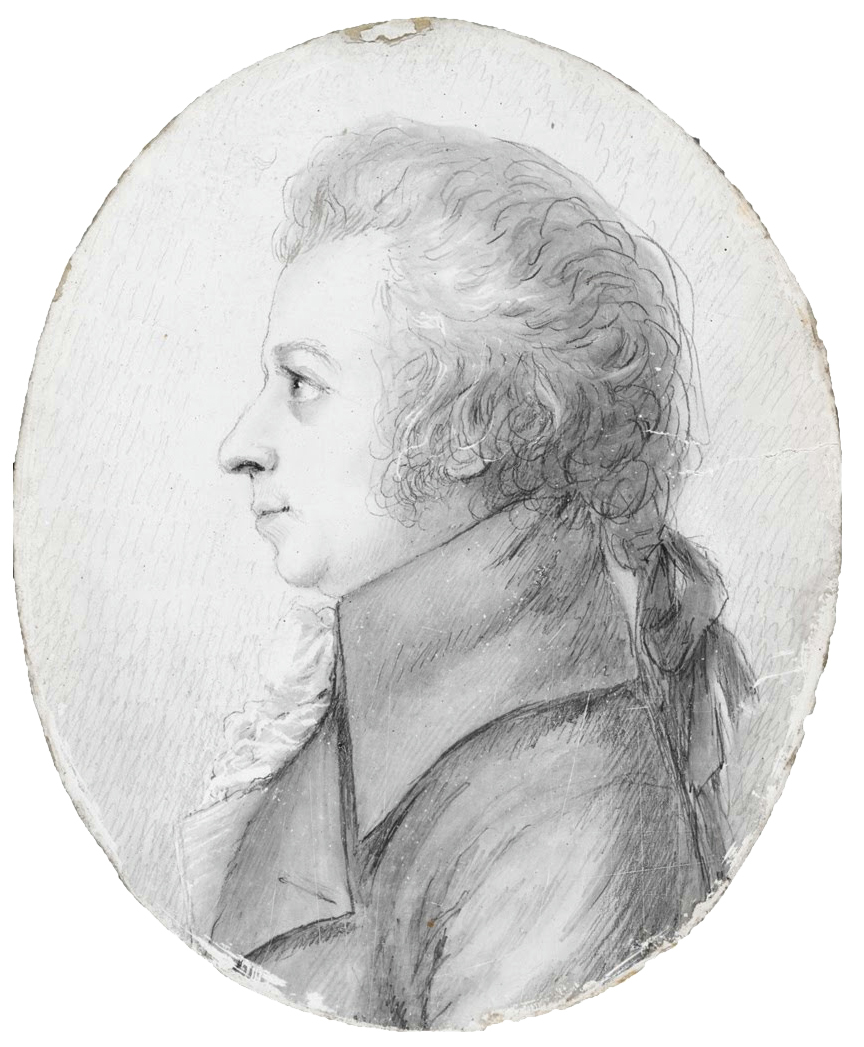
Dora Stock's 1789 miniature of Mozart

"Abendempfindung an Laura", K. 523, is a song by Wolfgang Amadeus Mozart dated 24 June 1787 in Vienna, written at the time of the opera Don Giovanni and Eine kleine Nachtmusik.

== Text ==
The title translates as "Evening Sentiment". The poet is unknown, but scholars speculate the text may be written by Joachim Heinrich Campe. The song is in a melancholy mood, with the singer reviewing his failed romantic relationship and the inevitability of death.

Abend ist's, die Sonne ist verschwunden,
Und der Mond strahlt Silberglanz;
So entflieh'n des Lebens schönste Stunden,
Flieh'n vorüber wie im Tanz!

Bald entflieht des Lebens bunte Szene,
Und der Vorhang rollt herab.
Aus ist unser Spiel! Des Freundes Träne
Fließet schon auf unser Grab.

Bald vielleicht (mir weht, wie Westwind leise,
Eine stille Ahnung zu)
Schließ' ich dieses Lebens Pilgerreise,
Fliege in das Land der Ruh'.

Werdet ihr dann an meinem Grabe weinen,
Trauernd meine Asche seh'n,
Dann, o Freunde, will ich euch erscheinen
Und will Himmel auf euch weh'n.

Schenk' auch du ein Tränchen mir
Und pflücke mir ein Veilchen auf mein Grab;
Und mit deinem seelenvollen Blicke
Sieh' dann sanft auf mich herab.

Weih mir eine Träne, und ach!
Schäme dich nur nicht, sie mir zu weih'n,
Oh, sie wird in meinem Diademe
Dann die schönste Perle sein.

It is evening, the sun has disappeared,
and the moon shines silver lustre;
Thus flee life's fairest hours,
Flee away as if in a dance.

Soon flees life's colorful scene,
And the curtain comes down;
Done is our play, the friend's tear
Flow already on our grave.

Soon, perhaps (like a gentle west wind,
A quiet foreboding blows toward me)
I close this life's pilgrimage,
And fly to the land of rest.

Will you then weep at my grave,
Look in mourning at my ashes,
Then, o friends, I will appear
And wave you towards heaven.

You too gift me a little tear and pluck
Me a violet for my grave,
And with your soulful gaze
Look then gently down on me.

Consecrate a tear to me, and alas!
Do not be ashamed for such dedication;
O, it will be in my diadem
Then the most beautiful pearl!

== Music ==
Mozart's longest song, lasting 110 bars, is in the time signature of in alla breve and in the key of F major. The varying music moods, wide ranging tonal scheme and contemplation of sadness are reminiscent of Schubert. The composer is in an unusually restrained and contemplative mood. A typical performance lasts around 5 minutes.
