= Mozart's personal catalog of works =

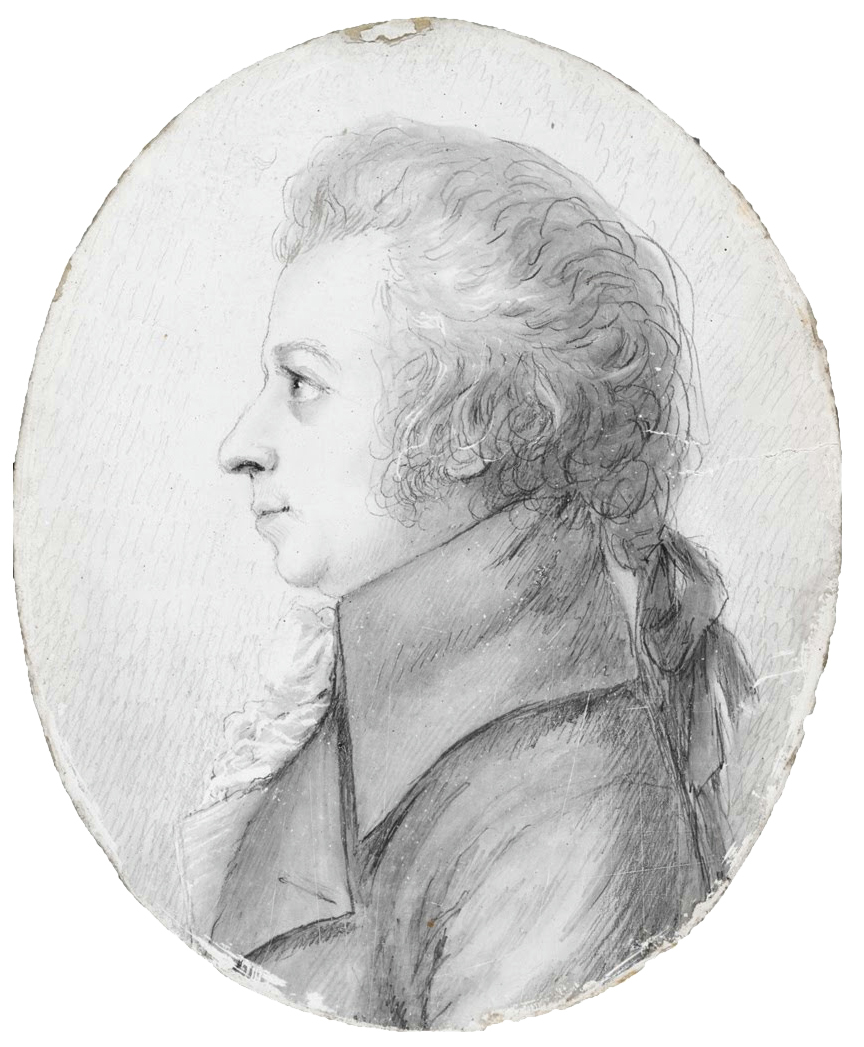
Drawing of Mozart in silverpoint, made by Dora Stock during Mozart's visit to Dresden, April 1789

Mozart's personal catalog of works is a hand-written document that the composer Wolfgang Amadeus Mozart created over the years 1784 to 1791. In it, he attempted to provide a clear description, with both verbal annotation and musical incipit, of every work he wrote during that time. The catalog survives today (in both original and published form) and serves as a standard basis for dating and authenticating Mozart's works.

== Title ==
Mozart entitled the document "Verzeichnüss aller meiner Werke vom Monath Febraio 1784 bis Monath _____ 1 _______", meaning "Catalog of all my works from the month of February 1784 to the month of _____ 1 _______" (underscores designate blank space). As Dexter Edge notes, "He has left both the month and year blank for the closing date of the catalogue, poignantly writing a single “1” instead of “17" in the expectation that the catalogue might serve him into the 1800s." (Mozart died in 1791, at age 35.)

The spelling "Verzeichnüss" is an oddity, occasionally found in earlier 18th century sources; modern Standard German has "Verzeichnis". Scholars sometimes echo Mozart's spelling simply to indicate which catalog they are referring to, since any other catalog (e.g., the Köchel catalogue) would bear the standard spelling "Verzeichnis".

== Format ==
Mozart used the verso (left-side) page of each opening (i.e., page-pair) for verbal descriptions, and the recto (right-side) page for the corresponding incipits. There are five works recorded on each opening.

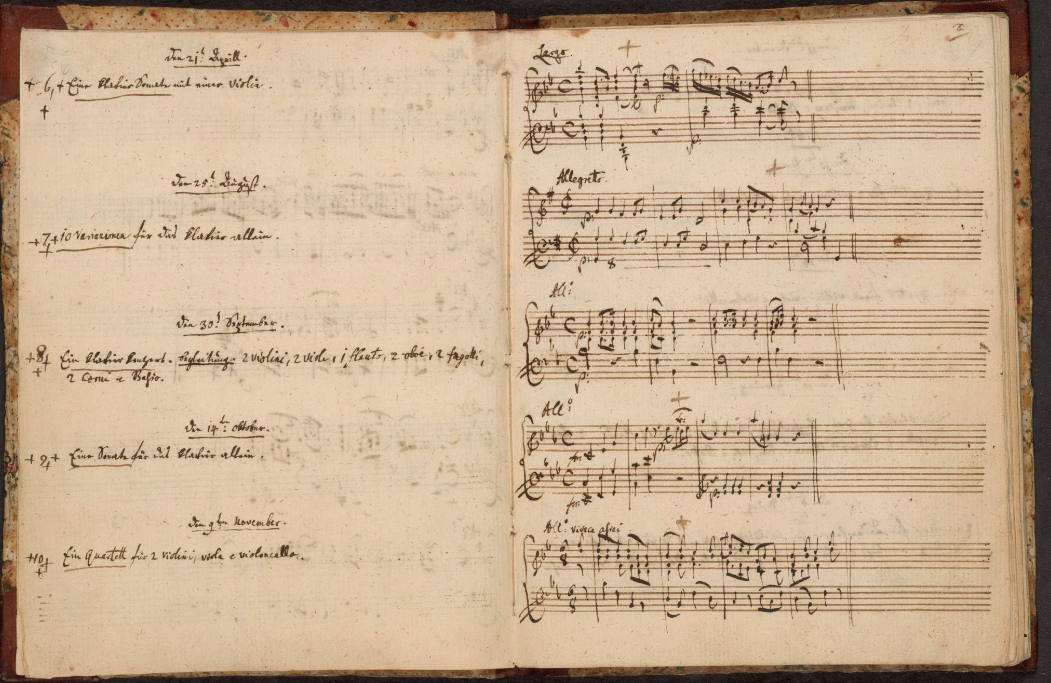
Page 8, 1784

The five works on this particular opening are as follows (Mozart's identifications):

- Den 21ten April. No. 6. Eine Klavier Sonata mit einer Violin
- Den 25ten August. No. 7. 10 Variationen für das Klavier allein
- Den 30ten September. No. 8. Ein Klavier Konzert Begleitung. 2 Violini, 2 Viole, 1 Flauto, 2 Oboe, 2 Fagotti, 2 Corni et Basso
- Den 14ten October. No. 9. Eine Sonata für das Klavier allein
- Den 9ten November. No. 10. Ein Quartett für 2 Violini, Viola e Violoncello

Mozart's combination of German and Italian may be translated thus:

- 21 April. No. 6. A piano sonata with a violin
- 25 August. No. 7. 10 variations for piano solo
- 30 September. No. 8. A piano concerto. Accompaniment: 2 violin (parts), 2 violas, 1 flute, 2 oboes, 2 bassoons, 2 horns, and bass [instruments]
- 14 October. No. 9. A sonata for piano solo.
- 9 November. No. 10. A quartet for 2 violins, viola, and violoncello

In modern terminology, these works might referred to as follows:

- Violin Sonata in B♭ major, K. 454
- Ten Variations on an Air by Gluck for solo piano, K. 455
- Piano Concerto in B♭ major, K. 456
- Piano Sonata in C minor, K. 457
- String Quartet in B♭ major, "Hunt", K. 458

The consecutive numbers in the Köchel catalogue (the primary compilation by scholars of Mozart's works) attest the importance of Mozart's personal catalogue in establishing dates.

== Scripts ==
Alan Tyson writes, "For his entries Mozart uses two styles of handwriting, with different forms for many letters: 'German script' and 'Roman script'. He used the former for most of the German-language entries, and the latter for most of the Italian words." The difference in handwriting can be seen in the detail image below, which represents the entry given above for the piano concerto K. 456.

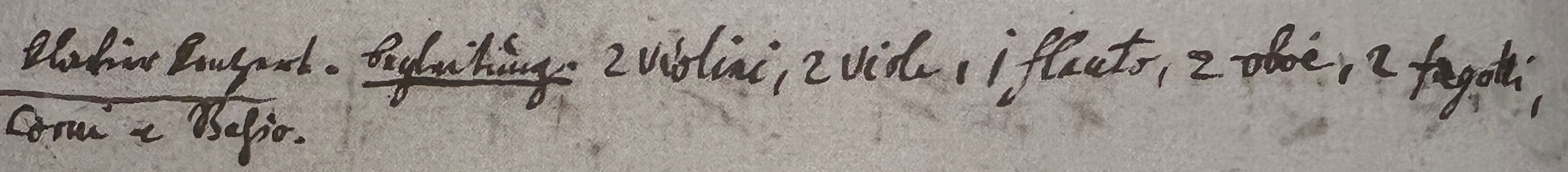
[German] Klavier Konzert begleitung. [Italian] 2 Violini, 2 Viole, 1 Flauto, 2 Oboé [= Oboi], 2 Fagotti, 2 Corni et Basso, i.e. "Piano concerto. Accompaniment: 2 violin (parts), 2 violas, 1 flute, 2 oboes, 2 bassoons, 2 horns, and bass [instruments]"

== History ==
Hermann Abert treats the origin of the catalog as part of his assessment of Mozart's personality: "It is entirely typical of Mozart that from time to time he made a sincere effort to put his affairs in order." Abert notes that at the same time Mozart began to keep his musical catalog, he also made a catalog of all household expenditures (in which, for instance, he recorded his purchase of a pet starling). The expenditures catalog, unlike the musical one, was soon abandoned.

The first entry in the musical catalog was on 9 February 1784 for the Piano Concerto No. 14, K. 449. It was continued up to the last possible moment: Mozart recorded his last completed work, the Little Masonic Cantata K. 623, on 15 November 1791, and took to (what turned out to be) his deathbed five days later.

The catalog was retained for a time after Mozart's death (5 December 1791) by his widow Constanze, who used it as a resource for her campaign of publishing her husband's works. Constanze first revealed the existence of the catalog in a 1798 letter to the publishers Breitkopf & Härtel, then in 1800 sold the catalog (along with many musical works) to a different publisher, Johann Anton André, who published it in 1805. The original was kept first by André's heirs, then made its way into the prodigious autograph collection of Stefan Zweig; according to Rosenthal Zweig "regarded it as the most precious of all his musical treasures." Zweig's heirs first lent his collection (1956) to the British Museum, then finally donated it in 1986 to the British Library (the successor institution of the British Museum for its purpose as national library). It remains in the British Library today.

The work is currently available in published form, both as a facsimile (photographs of what Mozart wrote) and in versions (such as André's) that convert Mozart's handwriting into more legible printed form. Both are provided, along with commentary, in the facsimile edition of Rosenthal and Tyson (1990).

The catalog is evidently not a perfect characterization of what Mozart wrote during the period, as there are attested works that have no entry. Further, there are entries for which the piece described had been lost.

== Significance ==
The catalog, which the music critic Nicholas Kenyon called "priceless," serves as a major source for the dating and authentication of Mozart's works. It provides facts that are sometimes encountered in commentary about various works by Mozart:

- Commentators sometimes express a sense of astonishment that the last three symphonies (39, 40, 41), all pinnacles of the classical literature, were composed according to the catalog within a very short period in 1788 (catalog entry dates 26 June, 25 July, 10 August, respectively).
- The famous Mozart serenade Eine kleine Nachtmusik probably owes its familiar title to its catalog entry, where Mozart probably was not inventing a title but simply recording that he had finished a short notturno or night-music.

The catalog also sometimes gives a glimpse into how Mozart himself felt about his works or compositional practice.

- The view that Mozart's final opera The Magic Flute is not best regarded as a mere Singspiel receives, perhaps, some support from the fact that in the catalog Mozart calls it "A German opera".
- Mozart's characterization of K. 454 as "a piano sonata with a violin" is in line with the general view that, through the late 18th century, so-called "violin sonatas" were normally dominated by the piano part.
- The entries for operas typically list the particular singers for whom Mozart wrote the roles, even though this would hardly be necessary to identify the music. This can be related to the great emphasis Mozart placed on composing music suited to a particular singer, as in the oft-quoted, "I like an aria to fit a singer as accurately as a well-made suit of clothes."
- A number of works list a different tempo marking from what appears in the autograph. Tyson suggests that this can tell us which pairs of tempo markings were intuitively close for Mozart, who lived before the age of the metronome.

== Proposed later dates of origin ==
Leeson & Whitwell (1973) point out some datings in the catalog that fail to make sense in light of other facts known about Mozart's career.

- The piano variations K. 455, noted above, were unlikely to have been finished on the catalog date of 7 August 1784 given evidence that Mozart performed them in public "as early as 23 March 1783."
- The violin sonata K. 454 seems to be dated too early, 21 April 1784, because Mozart wrote to his father 24 April that he was working on it. Moreover, at the premiere performance on 29 April with the violinist Regina Strinasacchi, Mozart played his own part mostly from memory, it being not yet written out.
- The piano concerto K. 456 could not have been premiered by Maria Theresia Paradis in Paris any later than 2 October 1784, since she left the city then. This makes the catalog completion date of 30 September anomalous, in light of how fast mss. could be shipped in Mozart's day (it is approximately 1200 kilometers from Vienna to Paris). Even with a remarkable delivery speed, the pianist Paradis was blind and would have needed some time to memorize her part.

Leeson and Whitwell have a theory of these anomalies: that Mozart decided to start his catalog in late, not early 1784, and, choosing to begin at the beginning of the current year, did some sloppy guessing about the dates of the works he had already finished. In support of their hypothesis, Leeson and Whitwell suggest that the anomalies cease after 1784; which makes sense assuming that Mozart thereafter entered every work promptly on completion. Moreover, Leeson and Whitwell were able to access the original manuscript, and from their inspection concluded that the inks and handwriting are uniform for 1784 but vary work-by-work afterwards, as would be expected under their scenario. Tyson (1990:14-15) is however skeptical of their proposal and offers alternative accounts of the anomalies.

A more radical proposal concerning the preparation of the catalog was put forth by the Mozart scholar Ulrich Konrad, and summarized on the British Library website thus: "[Konrad suggests], on the basis of the inks used, that a much larger group of entries occupying the first ten leaves of the Verzeichnüss may have been taken from an earlier catalogue and transferred to the present book in 1786." Tyson (1990:15) acknowledges, without further discussion, a long sequence of entries (far more than the first ten) that "look as if they have been made with the same ink and the same writing instrument."

== See also ==
- List of compositions by Wolfgang Amadeus Mozart

== Notes ==
=== Sources ===
- Abert, Hermann (2016). W. A. Mozart. Translated by Stewart Spencer. new footnotes by Cliff Eisen (revised ed.). New Haven: Yale University Press.
- Bandy, Dorian (2021). "Mozart's operatic embellishments". Cambridge Opera Journal (33): 1–23.
- Branscombe, Peter; Bauman, Thomas (2001). "Singspiel (Ger.: 'sung play')". Grove Music Online (8th ed.). Oxford University Press. doi:10.1093/gmo/9781561592630.article.25877. ISBN 978-1-56159-263-0. (subscription, Wikilibrary access, or UK public library membership required)
- Chesser, Richard (2006). "Turning the pages: Mozart's own thematic catalogue" (PDF). to IAML-IAMIC-IMS Conference, Göteborg, Sweden, June 18–23, 2006: Contemporary classical music – via International Association of Music Libraries, Archives and Documentation Centres.
- Konrad, Ulrich (1992) Mozarts Schaffensweise . Studien zu den Werkautographen , Skizzen und Entwürfen. ("Mozart's compositional method: Studies of the autographs of the works, sketches, and drafts"). Göttingen: Vandenhoeck und Ruprecht. [Not seen.]
- Deutsch, Otto Erich (1965). Mozart: A Documentary Biography. Stanford, California: Stanford University Press.
- Edge, Dexter (2001). Mozart's Viennese copyists (Ph.D. dissertation). University of Southern California – via academia.edu.
- Leeson, Daniel N.; Whitwell, David (August 1973). "Mozart's Thematic Catalogue". The Musical Times. 114 (1566): 781–783. doi:10.2307/957557. JSTOR 957557.
- Albi Rosenthal and Alan Tyson (1990) Mozart's Thematic Catalogue: A Facsimile. Ithaca, NY: Cornell University Press.
- Tyson, Alan (1987) Mozart: Studies of the Autograph Scores. Cambridge, MA: Harvard University Press.
