= Giambattista Varesco =

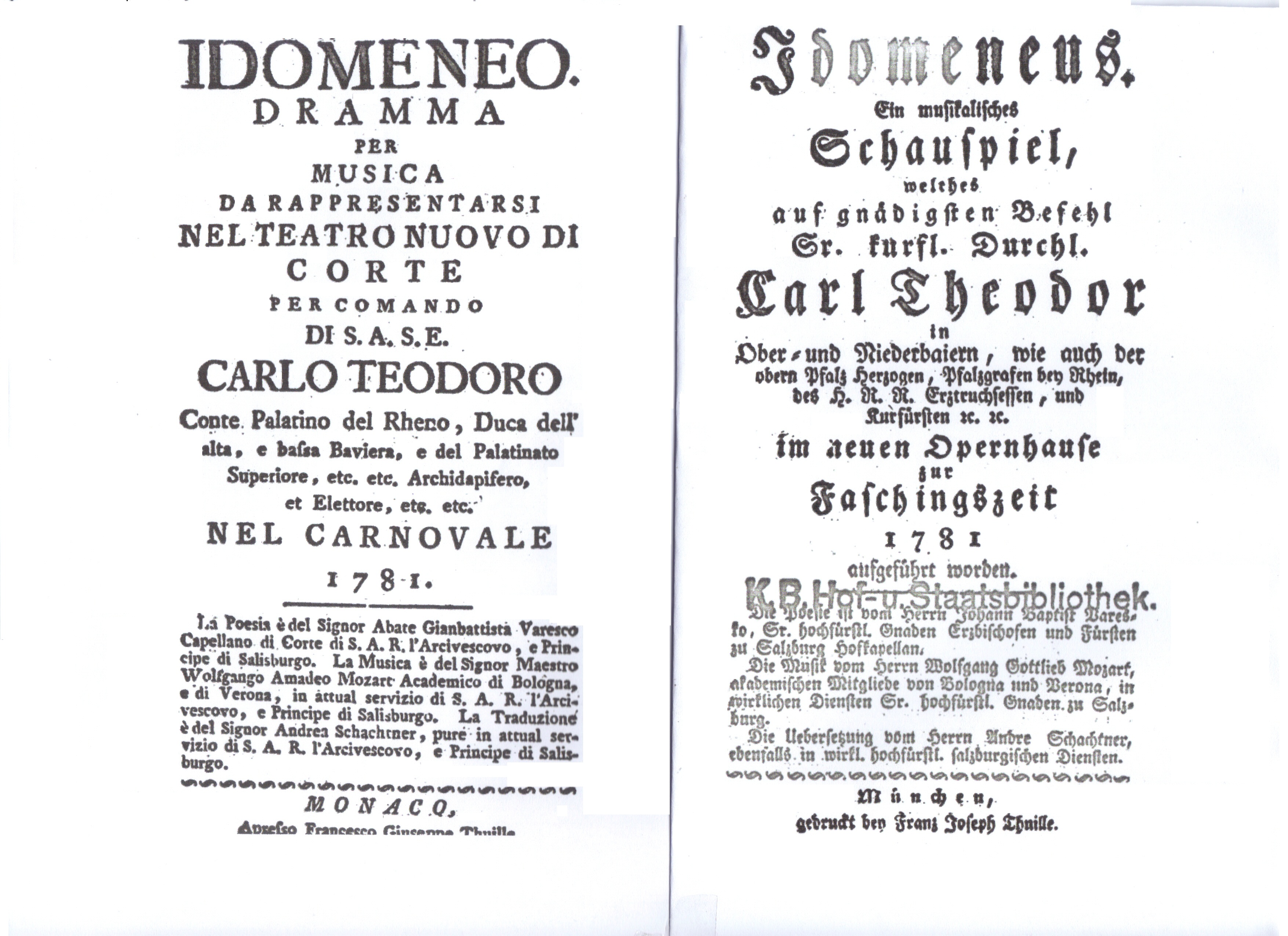
Italian and German title pages of the original libretto of Mozart's opera, Idomeneo

Father Giambattista Varesco (26 November 1735 – 25 August 1805) was a chaplain, musician, poet and (most famously) librettist to Wolfgang Amadeus Mozart. His given name variously appears as Giambattista, Gianbattista, Giovanni Battista and Girolamo Giovanni Battista. He is sometimes referred to with the Italian title Abate or the French Abbé, both used for priests:

he was chaplain at the Salzburg court chapel from 1766.

== Life and career ==
Giambattista Battista Varesco was born in Trento, Italy on 26 November 1735. He attended the Jesuit college in his home town where he was educated in the liberal arts as well as music. In 1766 he became a chaplain in the Roman Catholic Archdiocese of Salzburg in the service of Archbishop Sigismund von Schrattenbach. In addition to his duties as a chaplain, he was a musician in the archbishop’s orchestra.

Varesco's presence in the Salzburg court and his background as an Italian with a thorough liberal arts education made him an attractive candidate to Wolfgang Amadeus Mozart when he was searching for a new opera librettist to work on the opera Idomeneo. Mozart approach Varesco with the offer after receiving a commission to create an opera for the Munich court in 1780 from Karl Theodor, Elector of Bavaria. He accepted and the Bavarian Court paid Varesco 90 gulden.

Idomeneo was based on Antoine Danchet's libretto for the earlier opera Idoménée. Varesco translated Danchet's French-language libretto into Italian and rewrote a considerable portion with new text under Mozart's supervision.. Leopold Mozart acted as a local intermediary for his son, and their correspondence left many details on the collaboration, and showed the composer's dissatisfaction, primarily with the excessive length of the text. In a letter in December 1780 Mozart wrote:

Ask the Abbate Varesco if we could not break off at the chorus in the second act, Placido e il mare after Elettra's first verse, when the chorus is repeated,--at all events after the second, for it is really far too long. (V.1. - 43/46)

Varesco resented the many cuts and changes that Mozart demanded, and insisted that his original text be published in full, which Mozart used as an excuse for cuts he made without the librettist's approval. In a letter from Mozart to his father, who acted as a go-between for him in Salzburg, Mozart notes Varesco's admission that he had "not the slightest knowledge or experience of the theatre." After completing the work, the opera premiered at the Vienna Court Opera on 29 January 1781.

Beginning in 1783, Mozart and Varesco collaborated again on a lesser known opera, L'oca del Cairo, which they ultimately did not complete; abandoning the project in 1784. Varesco also edited Metastasio's libretto for Il re pastore, one of Mozart's lesser operas. He later collaborated with Michael Haydn on the opera seria Andromeda e Perseo (1787).

Varesco died in poverty in Salzburg on 25 August 1805.
