= Leck mich im Arsch (Insane Clown Posse song) =

Single by Insane Clown Posse and Jack White
- B-side: "Mountain Girl"
- Released: September 13, 2011
- Recorded: August 2011
- Genre: Rap metal
- Length: 3:06
- Label: Third Man
- Songwriters: Violent J, Shaggy 2 Dope, Wolfgang Amadeus Mozart and Jack White
- Producer: Jack White

Insane Clown Posse singles chronology
"Fonz Pond" (2011)	"Leck mich im Arsch" (2011)	"It's All Over" (2012)

Jack White singles chronology
"Fly Farm Blues" (2009)	"Leck Mich Im Arsch" (2011)	"Love Interruption" (2012)

"Leck mich im Arsch" is a song by Insane Clown Posse and Jack White. The lyrics are inspired by "Leck mich im Arsch", a scatological canon by Wolfgang Amadeus Mozart (K. 231/382c), while the music is based on a canon called "Leck mir den Arsch fein recht schön sauber" (K. 233/382d). The latter has for two centuries been attributed to Mozart but evidence has shown that the music of the piece was composed by Wenzel Trnka and Mozart merely replaced the original lyrics with his own.

== Background ==
In August 2011, Insane Clown Posse was contacted by Jack White, who invited Joseph Bruce and Joseph Utsler to his mansion, because he wanted to collaborate with them. White played the track he was working on, an arrangement of Wolfgang Amadeus Mozart's "Leck mich im Arsch" (German for "Lick my ass!") with live instrumentation by JEFF the Brotherhood, for Bruce and Utsler and explained what the title of the track translated to.

Insane Clown Posse were surprised that White wanted to work with them, and said that they had respect for White, who is also from Detroit. Violent J said, "The most respected musician in the world and one of the most hated musicians in the world. We didn't expect that call, brother. I told him, 'I gotta know—why us?'. He said, 'I find myself going to your web site and looking at it. Some stuff I think is genius, some stuff I don't understand at all, but I always find myself going back there and seeing what you're up to."

== Production and release ==
Bruce perceived that the scatological nature of the composition was the reason why White asked Bruce and Utsler to appear on the song, but once White explained Mozart's sense of humor, they became excited to work on it. Insane Clown Posse went back to their hotel room to write their lyrics, and returned to record with White and JEFF the Brotherhood in White's home recording studio. Bruce and Utsler's vocals were recorded in one take. Insane Clown Posse said that the song was a collaboration and that White asked them for their feedback throughout the recording process. The song was released as a single on September 13, 2011 by White's label Third Man Records.

== Reception ==
Response to the song was first marked by surprise at the collaboration, CBS News calling it "a head-scratcher". It was described as "combin[ing] Violent J and Shaggy 2 Dope's wacky rhymes with Mozart's pristine melody, all thanks to Jack White".

On the German website The Circle, Victoria Schaffrath wrote: "But not everything that works in theory should be put into practice. The result of this collaboration is hard to describe: questionably produced strings, women crooning operetta-like "Kiss my ass" with American accents. Then "Violent J" and "Shaggy 2 Dope" join in, impressing with lines like "Mozart, dope for the most part / respected, cause he knows art." We'd rather not quote the rest of the lyrics here. The "homage," if you can even call it that, lasts a total of 185 seconds." Charlie Jones, of DMY, depicted the song as follows: "Set over the urgent German vocals which continuously demand "Leck Mich Im Arsch", the contribution from the masked hip hop outfit consists mainly of drawn-out skits and more exploration on the theme of bum-licking than you ever thought possible."

Ray Finlayson, of Beats per Minute, was very critical of the result. A review for Glide warned the audience: "If you don't like it, well I can understand good taste. But how can you not laugh at lines like this: Call it a fetish, call him a freak, callin' in need of a tongue on his butt cheek."
