= Anilingus =

Orally stimulating the anus of another person

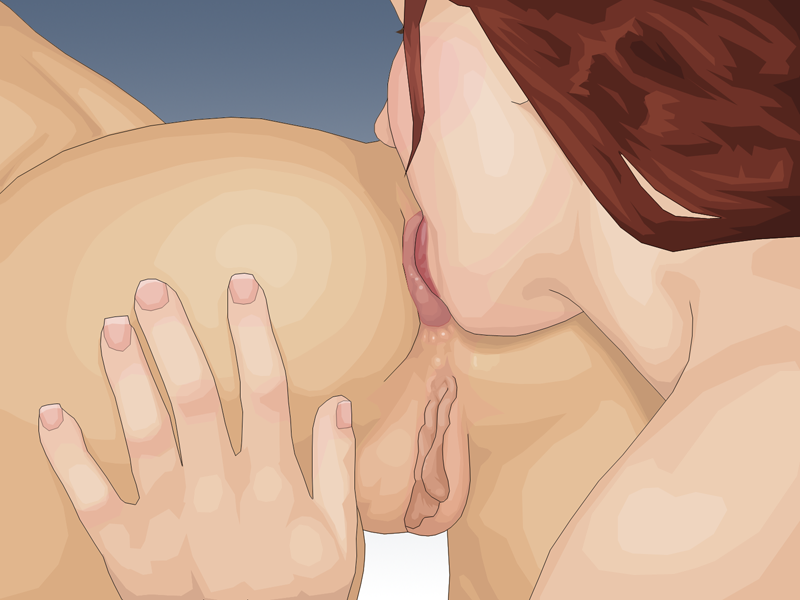
Lesbian anilingus, illustrated by Seedfeeder

Anilingus (also spelled analingus) is an oral and anal sex act (anal–oral contact or anal–oral sex) in which one person stimulates the anus of another by using their tongue or lips.

The anus has a relatively high concentration of nerve endings and can be an erogenous zone, so the recipient may receive pleasure from external anal stimulation, whereas pleasure for the giver is usually based more on the principle of the act. People may engage in anilingus for its own sake, before anal penetration, or as part of foreplay. All sexual orientations may participate in the act. Studies confirm anilingus to be one of the sexual practices between women, though only practiced by a minority.

Safer sex practices generally revolve around hygiene so as to prevent fecal–oral route transmission of diseases. Extra precautions include STI testing, dental dams, or enemas.

== Slang terms ==
Analingus is also known in slang terminology as rimming (or rim-job), or salad tossing. The etymological origin of the term "toss someone's salad" is a 1970s gay-slang glossary, described as "encapsulat[ing] the act's pleasure while retaining its delicacy [and being] the precursor to the main sexual event." It has since appeared in prison slang in the United States prison system, where performing anilingus on another inmate is one way of paying dues or gaining favor.

== Etymology ==
The term anilingus comes from the Latin words anus and -lingus, from lingere, meaning "to lick" and is based on the pattern of cunnilingus. It entered English through the 1899 F. J. Rebman translation of Edition 10 of sexologist Richard von Krafft-Ebing's 1886 book Psychopathia Sexualis.

== Practice ==
Anilingus can involve a variety of techniques to stimulate the anus, including use of the lips or licking; it may also involve the tongue moving around the edge of the anus or up and down the insides of the cheeks of the buttocks. Insertion of the tongue into the rectum is another possible technique.

== Health risks and prevention ==
=== Health risk ===
Anilingus has potential health risks arising from the oral contact with feces. Diseases which may be transmitted by contact with feces include: bacterial diseases including shigellosis (bacillary dysentery); viral systemic diseases including hepatitis A, hepatitis B, hepatitis C, poliomyelitis, human papillomavirus (HPV) and herpes simplex virus; parasites including intestinal parasites; and infections and inflammations chlamydia infection, gastroenteritis, conjunctivitis, gonorrhea, lymphogranuloma venereum and other sexually transmitted infections.

Applying the mouth to the genitals immediately after applying it to the anus can introduce the bacterium Escherichia coli ("E. coli") into the urethra, leading to a urinary tract infection. HIV/AIDS is not believed to be easily transmitted through anilingus.

Anilingus with a number of casual partners increases the health risks associated with the practice. Generally, people carrying infections that may be passed on during anilingus appear healthy. Parasites may be in the feces if undercooked meat was consumed. The feces contain traces of hepatitis A only if the infected person has eaten contaminated food.

=== Prevention ===
Safe sex practices may include thorough washing of the anal region before anilingus to wash away most external fecal particles and reduce the risk of contraction of fecal-sourced infection.

== In popular culture ==
In the 18th century, Wolfgang Amadeus Mozart wrote several canons on the topic, including the 1782 6-voice canon "Leck mich im Arsch", which repeats the request throughout. Similarly, he wrote the 1782 lyrics for "Leck mir den Arsch fein recht schön sauber" ("Lick my arse right well and clean"). Circa 1786, Mozart composed the 4-voice canon "O du eselhafter Peierl" which jokingly implores his friend to "lick his ass" alongside humorous insults and death threats.

In 2020, the Mozarteum uncovered a 21-year-old Mozart's humorous 1777 commission of a gay rimming scene for his family and friend's Bölzlschiessen target shooting practise. Knowing he would be out of town, he commissioned a target of (in Mozart's own words):

"...a small man with fair hair, bending over and showing his bare arse. From his mouth come the words: Enjoy the spread. The other figure should be shown in boots and spurs, a red suit and a beautiful wig according to the latest fashion; he must be of medium height and positioned in such a way that he appears to be licking the other man's arse. From his mouth come the words: Just go ahead."

In 2025, Men's Health published an explanation and list of techniques on the topic.

== See also ==
- Anal eroticism
- Anal fingering
- Facesitting
- Fecal bacteriotherapy
- Felching
