= Bei der Hitz im Sommer eß ich =

1782 canon for 3 voices, formerly attributed to W. A. Mozart

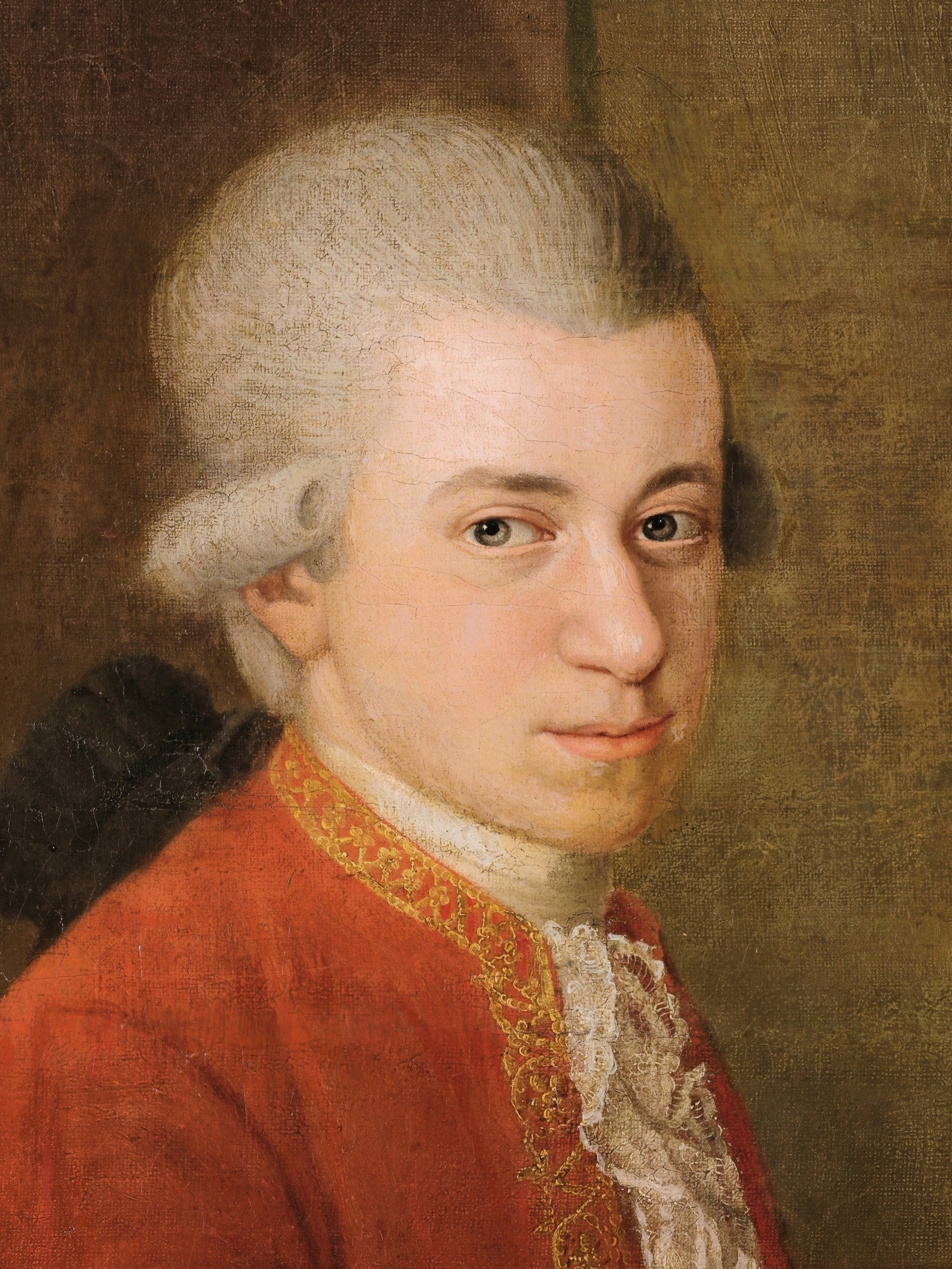
Detail from Portrait of the Mozart Family, c. 1781

"Bei der Hitz im Sommer eß ich" (English: In the heat of summer I eat) is a canon for three voices in G major, K. 234/382e/Anh.A 40. The music was long thought to have been composed by Wolfgang Amadeus Mozart during 1782 in Vienna, but now thought to be the work of Wenzel Trnka. The lyrics appear to stem from Mozart.

== Authenticity ==
In 1988, Wolfgang Plath presented evidence that the composer of this piece, as well as "Leck mir den Arsch fein recht schön sauber", K. 233/382d/Anh.A 39, was in fact Wenzel Trnka (1739–1791). That Mozart might not be the author of the canons K. 229, K. 230, "Leck mich im Arsch", K. 231, K. 233, K. 234 (this work) was already mentioned in the Bärenreiter Neue Mozart-Ausgabe (NMA) in 1974. Mozart's widow Constanze Mozart submitted the modified canon to publisher Breitkopf & Härtel.

== Lyrics ==
The rediscovered, probably original text reads:

Bei der Hitz im Sommer eß ich gerne
Wurzl und Kräuter auch Butter und Rettig;
treibt fürtreflich Wind und kühlet mich ab.
Ich nehm Limonade, Mandelmilch,
auch zu Zeiten Horner Bier;
das im heißen Sommer nur.
Ich für mich in Eis gekühlts Glas Wein,
Auch mein Glas Gefrohrnes.

In the heat of summer I like to eat
roots and spices, also butter and radish;
they expel a lovely wind and cool me.
I take lemonade, almond milk,
and at time beer from Horn;
that only in a hot summer.
I for me an ice-cooled glass of wine,
Also my glass of sorbet.

=== Alternative lyrics ===
Shown in Bärenreiter's Neue Mozart-Ausgabe is the text as changed for the 1804 edition of the canons in Œuvres Complettes by Breitkopf & Härtel.

Essen, Trinken, das erhält den Leib;
's ist doch mein liebster Zeitvertreib,
das Essen und Trinken!
Labt mich Speis und Trank nicht mehr,
dann ade, dann Welt, gute Nacht!
So ein Brätchen, ein Pastetchen, ach!
wenn die meinem Gaumen winken,
dann, dann ist mein Tag vollbracht!
Ach! und wenn im lieben Gläschen
Sorg und Gram darniedersinken,
dann aller Welt dann gute Nacht!

Eating, drinking, that sustains the body;
'tis my dearest pastime,
eating and drinking!
If food and drink refresh me no more,
the adieu, then world, good night!
Such a roast, a pie, alas!
when they greet my tongue,
then, then my day is made!
Alas! and when in a dear glass
worries and grief are drowned,
then to all the world: good night!

== See also ==
- Wenzel Trnka § The Mozart misattribution, for more on the canon's misattribution to Mozart
