= Swabian salute =

Humorous, euphemistic reference to the profanity Leck mich am Arsch ("kiss my arse")

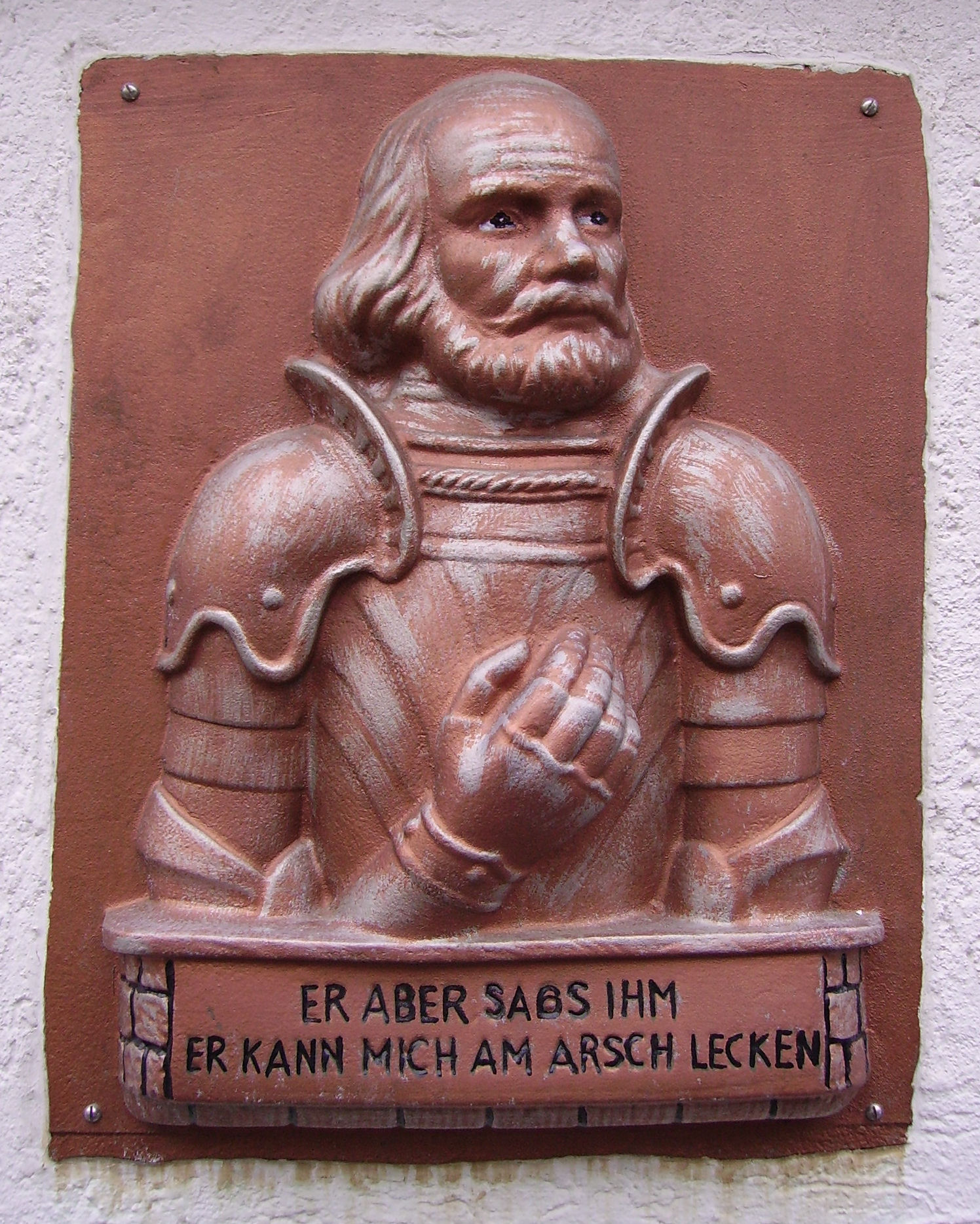
Götz von Berlichingen and the Swabian salute

The term Swabian salute (German: schwäbischer Gruß) is a partly humorous, partly euphemistic reference to the expression Leck mich am Arsch (akin to expression "kiss my arse", but literally "lick me on the arse") which is a common profanity.

== Origin ==
Perhaps the idea which is expressed in the literal meaning goes back to ancient magic conceptions that turning the bare bottom towards a danger or unwanted person (a demon, a witch, a curse) will work as a protection spell – see Anasyrma. Also, a reference to the feudal homage kiss could be recognized. Stone depictions of this act can be found on gates and walls of medieval buildings such as castles, town fortifications, monasteries and even churches in south Germany (not limited to Swabia), Austria, eastern France and some other places in Spain and Italy.

== Use ==
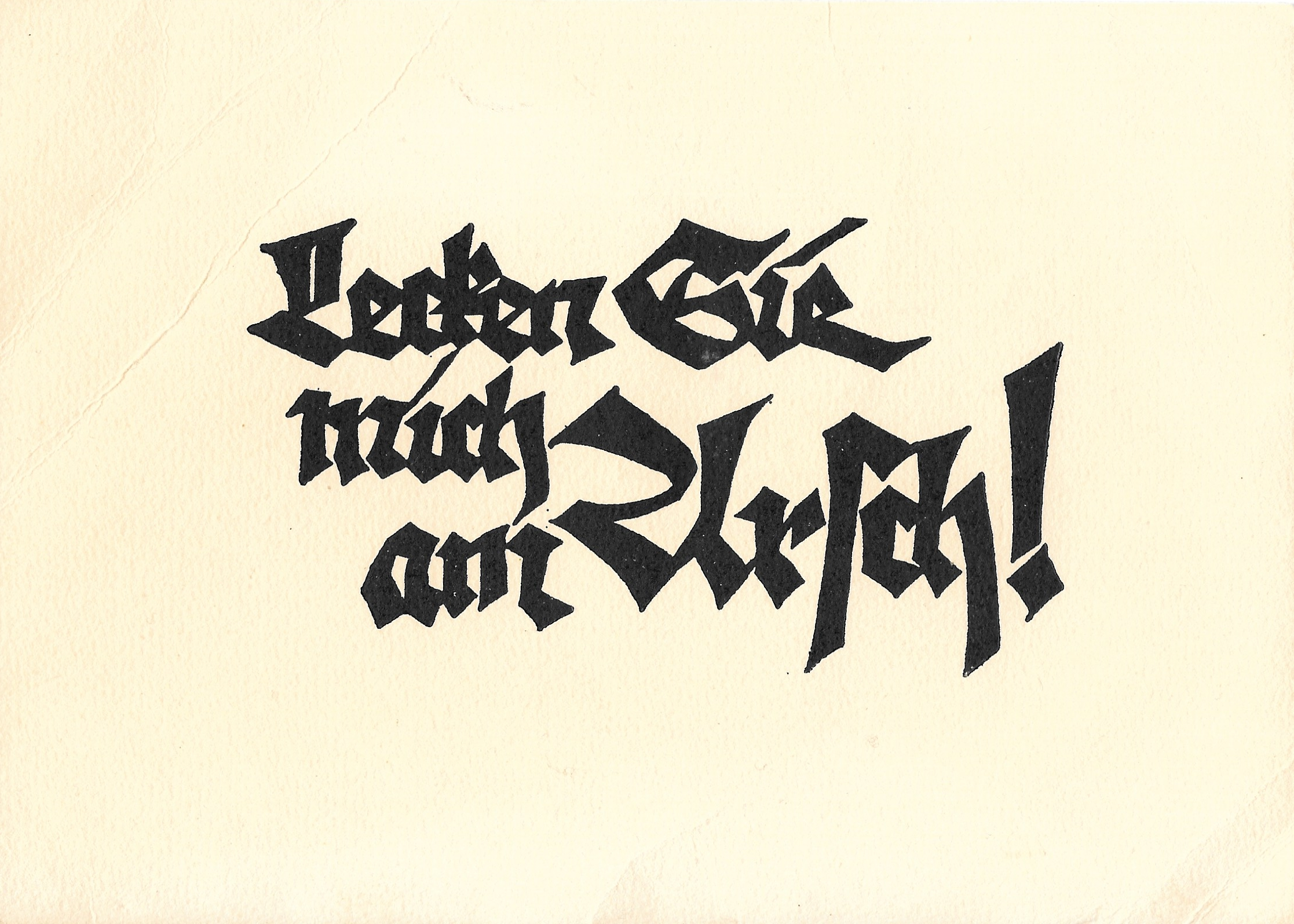
Postcard of Rudolf Koch

Although very common in most German-speaking areas with the possible exception of the extreme north of Germany, the Swabian salute is used for a whole number of purposes among the people of Swabia, Baden, parts of Bavaria and Austria, while in most other regions it is regarded merely as a rather vulgar insult.

According to the reasons given for a judgement of a German court, the mentioned words can serve the purpose of "picking up an earlier conversation, continuing a stagnating conversation, giving new impulses to a conversation, ultimately end a conversation". Writer Thaddäus Troll, who cited the court in his 1975 book Preisend mit viel schönen Reden, added more reasons: "to express surprise, to express joy about unexpectedly meeting a fellow Swabian, to turn down a request regarded unacceptable". Naturally, the salute is also used as an insult in the mentioned regions. The intended sense must be carefully judged by context and intonation.

As with any popular phrase of this kind, a multitude of variations and more or less humorous replies exist. A very common abbreviation which is understood anywhere is LMAA (simplified variant: LMA); it is also used in spoken language. The short form Leck mich is widely known as well. The term can be emphasised by adding kreuzweise (crosswise), and that term alone is also used as a pars pro toto abbreviation.

== In the arts ==
The Swabian salute was immortalized in Goethe's drama Götz von Berlichingen and can also be found in title and text of two of Mozart's 1782 canons, "Leck mich im Arsch" and "Leck mir den Arsch fein recht schön sauber"; the composer of the second is now thought to be Wenzel Trnka, but the words are attributed Mozart.

== See also ==
- Mooning
