= K231 =

K231 or K-231 may refer to:

- K-231 (Kansas highway), a former state highway in Kansas
- HMCS Calgary (K231), a former Canadian Navy ship
- Klub 231, an organisation of former political prisoners in 1968 Czechoslovakia

== See also ==
- Leck mich im Arsch, by W A Mozart; K.231 in the Kochel catalogue
