= Mozart and scatology =

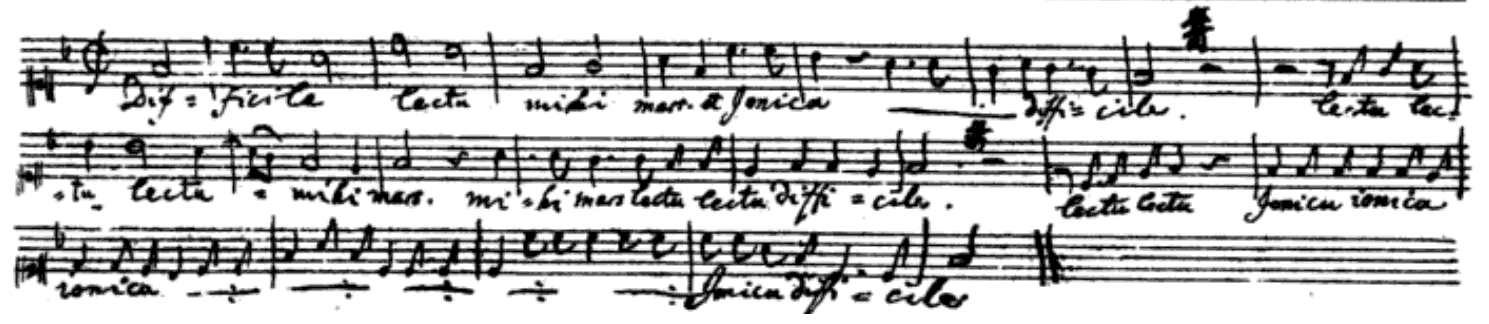
Reproduction of the original manuscript of Mozart's canon "Difficile lectu". The words "lectu mihi mars" were intended to be heard as "Leck du mich im Arsch" ("lick my arse"), a phrase commonly used in Mozart's family circle.

Wolfgang Amadeus Mozart used scatological humour in his letters and multiple recreational compositions. This material has puzzled Mozart scholars; some have attempted to understand it in relation to an "impressive list" of psychiatric conditions Mozart is claimed to have had. Others have noted that the scatology is understood in terms of its role in Mozart's family, his society and his times.

== Examples ==
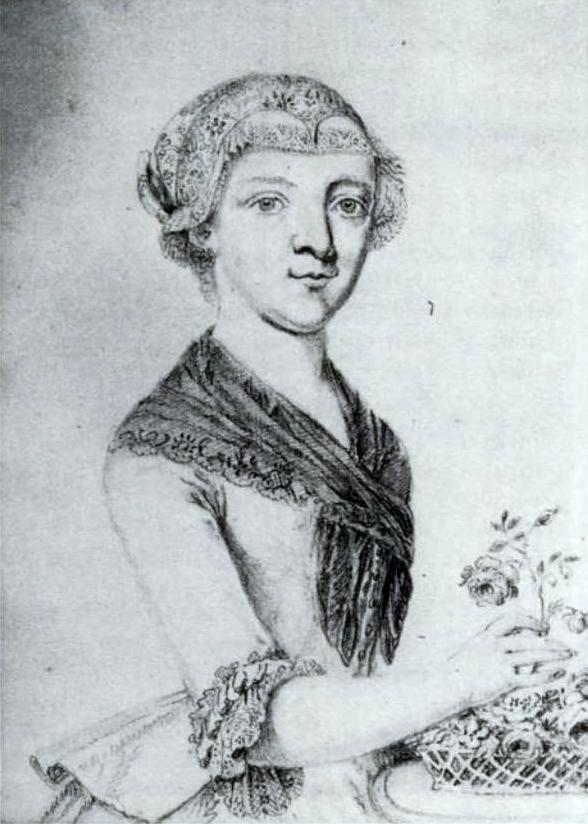
Self-portrait in pencil of Maria Anna Thekla Mozart, from 1777 or 1778

A letter dated 5 November 1777 to Mozart's cousin (and probable love-interest) Maria Anna Thekla Mozart is an example of Mozart's use of scatology. The German original is in rhymed verse.

Well, I wish you good night, but first,
Shit in your bed and make it burst.
Sleep soundly, my love
Into your mouth your arse you'll shove.

Mozart's canon "Leck mich im Arsch" K. 231 (K^{6} 382c) includes the lyrics:

Leck mich im A[rsch] g'schwindi, g'schwindi!
Lick me in the arse, quickly, quickly!

"Leck mich im Arsch" is a standard vulgarism in German, euphemistically called the Swabian salute (German: schwäbischer Gruß). Although contemporary German would rather say "Leck mich am Arsch."

== Context ==
Musicologist David Schroeder wrote in 1999:

The passage of time has created an almost unbridgeable gulf between ourselves and Mozart's time, forcing us to misread his scatological letters even more drastically than his other letters. Very simply, these letters embarrass us, and we have tried to suppress them, trivialize them, or explain them out of the epistolary canon with pathological excuses.

When Margaret Thatcher was apprised of Mozart's scatology while seeing Peter Shaffer's play Amadeus, director Peter Hall relates:

She was not pleased ...[and] gave me a severe wigging for putting on a play that depicted Mozart as a scatological imp with a love of four-letter words. It was inconceivable, she said, that a man who wrote such exquisite and elegant music could be so foul-mouthed. I said that Mozart's letters proved he was just that: he had an extraordinarily infantile sense of humour ... I offered (and sent) a copy of Mozart's letters to Number Ten the next day; I was even thanked by the appropriate Private Secretary. But it was useless: the Prime Minister said I was wrong, so wrong I was.

=== Letters ===
Benjamin Simkin, an endocrinologist, estimates that 39 of Mozart's letters include scatological passages. Almost all of these are directed to Mozart's own family, specifically his father Leopold, his mother Anna Maria, his sister Nannerl, and his cousin Maria Anna Thekla Mozart. According to Simkin, Leopold, Anna Maria and Nannerl also included scatological humour in their own letters. Thus, Anna Maria wrote to her husband (26 September 1777; original is in rhyme):

Addio, ben mio. Keep well, my love.
Into your mouth your arse you'll shove.
I wish you good night, my dear, but first,
Shit in your bed and make it burst.

Even the relatively straitlaced Leopold used a scatological expression in one letter.

Several of Mozart's scatological letters were written to Maria Anna Thekla Mozart, his cousin (and probable love interest, according to the musicologist Maynard Solomon). These are often called the "Bäsle letters", after the German word Bäsle, a diminutive form meaning "little cousin". In these letters, written after Mozart had spent a pleasant two weeks with his cousin in her native Augsburg, the scatology is combined with word play and sexual references. American academic Robert Spaethling's rendered translation of part of a letter Mozart sent from Mannheim 5 November 1777:

Dearest cozz buzz!

I have received reprieved your highly esteemed writing biting, and I have noted doted thy my uncle Garfuncle, my aunt Slant, and you too, are all well mell. We, too thank God, are in good fettle kettle ... You write further, indeed you let it all out, you expose yourself, you let yourself be heard, you give me notice, you declare yourself, you indicate to me, you bring me the news, you announce unto me, you state in broad daylight, you demand, you desire, you wish, you want, you like, you command that I, too, should could send you my Portrait. Eh bien, I shall mail fail it for sure. Oui, by the love of my skin, I shit on your nose, so it runs down your chin...

One of the letters Mozart wrote to his father while visiting Augsburg reports an encounter Mozart and his cousin had with a priest named Father Emilian:

[He was] an arrogant ass and a simple-minded little wit of his profession ... finally when he was a little drunk, which happened soon, he started on about music. He sang a canon, and said: I have never in my life heard anything more beautiful ... He started. I took the third voice, but I slipped in an entirely different text: 'P[ater] E: o du schwanz, leck mich im arsch' ["Father Emilian, oh you prick, lick me in the arse"]. Sotto voce, to my cousin. Then we laughed together for another half hour.

=== Music ===
Mozart's scatological music was most likely recreational and shared among a closed group of inebriated friends. All of it takes the form of canons (rounds), in which each voice enters with the same words and music following a delay after the previous voice. Musicologist David J. Buch writes:

It may seem strange that Mozart made fair copies, entered these items into his personal works catalogue (in which he tended to omit ephemeral works) and allowed them to be copied. The reason he favored these small and crude pieces in ways similar to his more serious and important works remains a mystery.

=== Reactions of family and friends ===
Historian Lucy Coatman argues that Maria Anna Thekla and Mozart likely had a shared sense of humour, something which she believes has been "discounted throughout much of the historiography on this set of correspondence". While scholars are not aware of her replies to her cousin, it can be assumed from what is known of their relationship and his continued correspondence that she was likely not offended by Mozart's vulgar references.

In 1798, Constanze sent her late husband's Bäsle letters to the publishers Breitkopf & Härtel, who at the time were gathering material in hopes of preparing a Mozart biography. In the accompanying letter she wrote "Although in dubious taste, the letters to his cousin are full of wit and deserve mentioning, although they cannot of course be published in their entirety." K.A. Aterman suggests that this ambivalence is a result of the "change in the taste and the 'refinement' spreading to, and in, the rising middle class" in the early 19th century.

=== In the 18th century ===
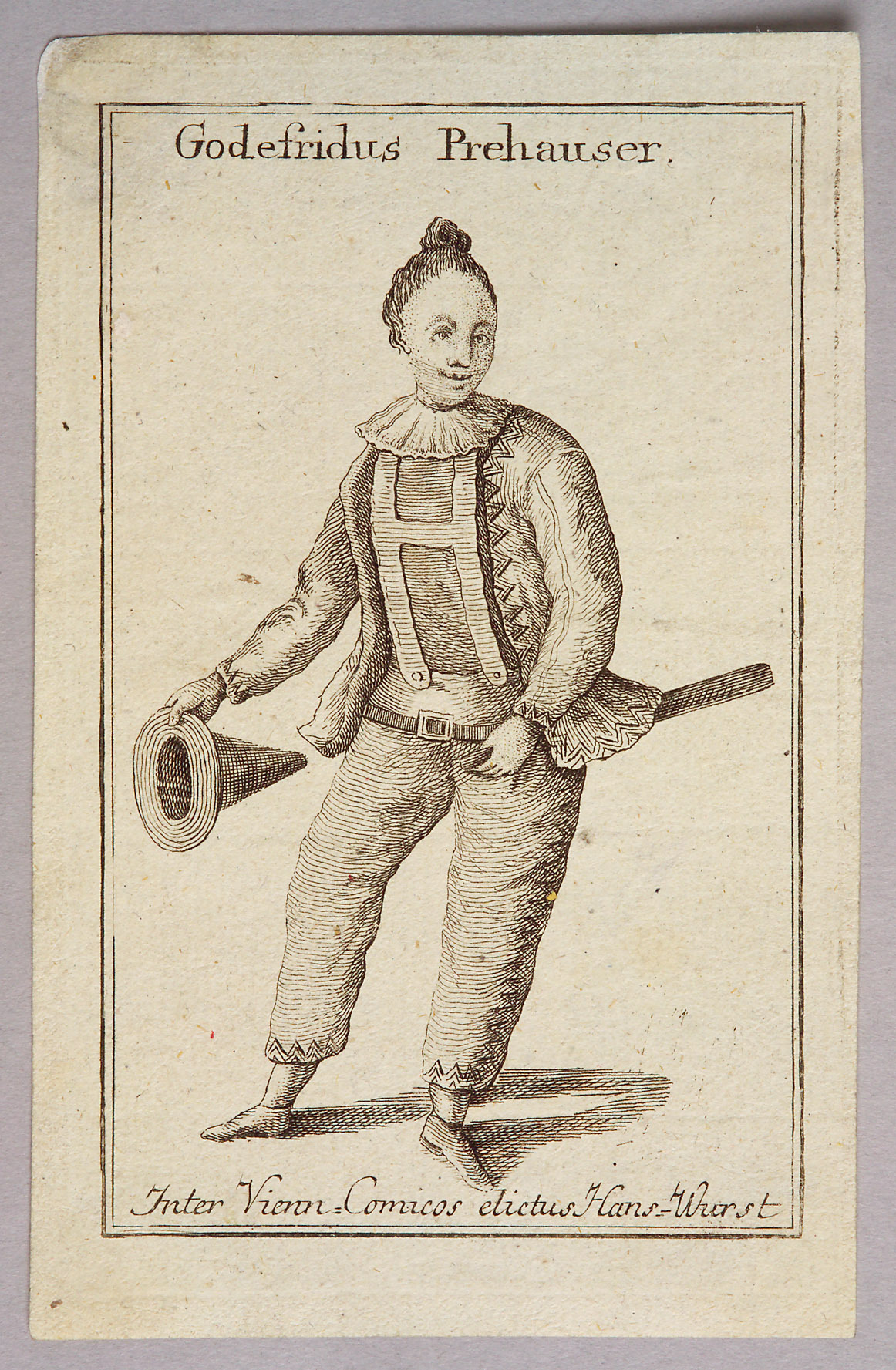
Gottfried Prehauser, an actor of 18th-century Vienna, playing Hanswurst

Schroeder (1999) suggests that in the 18th century scatological humour was far more public and "mainstream". The German-language popular theatre of Mozart's time was influenced by the Italian commedia dell'arte and emphasized the stock character of Hanswurst, a coarse and robust character who would entertain his audience by pretending to eat large and unlikely objects (for instance, a whole calf), then defecating them.

Schroeder suggests a political underlay to the scatology in popular theatre: its viewers lived under a system of hereditary aristocracy that excluded them from political participation. The vulgarity of scatological popular theatre was a counterpoint to the refined culture imposed from above. One of Mozart's own letters describes aristocrats in scatological terms; he identified the aristocrats present at a concert in Augsburg (1777) as "the Duchess Smackarse, the Countess Pleasurepisser, the Princess Stinkmess, and the two Princes Potbelly von Pigdick".

=== In German culture ===
The folklorist and cultural anthropologist Alan Dundes suggested that interest in or tolerance for scatological matters is a specific trait of German national culture, one which is retained to this day:

In German folklore, one finds an inordinate number of texts concerned with anality. Scheiße (shit), Dreck (dirt), Mist (manure), Arsch (ass), and other locutions are commonplace. Folksongs, folktales, proverbs, folk speech—all attest to the Germans' longstanding special interest in this area of human activity. I am not claiming that other peoples of the world do not express a healthy concern for this area, but rather that the Germans appear to be preoccupied with such themes. It is thus not so much a matter of difference as it is of degree.

Dundes (1984) provides ample coverage of scatological humor in Mozart, but also cites scatological texts from Martin Luther, Johann Wolfgang von Goethe, Heinrich Heine, and others who helped shape German culture. Karhausen (1993) asserts that "scatology was common in Mitteleuropa [central Europe]", noting for instance that Mozart's Salzburg colleague Michael Haydn also wrote a scatological canon.

Some of the phrases used by Mozart in his scatological material were not original with him but were part of the folklore and culture of his day: professor of German Mieder (2003) describes the Bäsle letters as involving "Mozart's intentional play with what is for the most part preformulated folk speech". An example given by Robert Spaethling is the folkloric origin of a phrase seen above, "Gute Nacht, scheiß ins Bett dass' Kracht", claimed by Spaethling to be a "children's rhyme that is still current in south German language areas today". Likewise, when Mozart sang to Aloysia Weber the words "Leck mich das Mensch im Arsch, das mich nicht will" ("Whoever doesn't want me can lick my arse") on the occasion of being romantically rejected by her, he was evidently singing an existing folk tune, not a song of his own invention.

== Medical accounts ==
An early 20th-century observer who suspected that Mozart's scatological materials could be interpreted by psychological pathologies was the Austrian writer Stefan Zweig, who amassed a large collection of musical manuscripts. His collection included the Bäsle letters (at the time, unpublished) as well as the autographs of Mozart's scatological canons "Difficile lectu" and "O du eselhafter Peierl". Zweig sent copies of the Bäsle letters to the psychiatrist Sigmund Freud with the following suggestion:

These nine letters ... throw a psychologically very remarkable light on his erotic nature, which, more so than any other important man, has elements of infantilism and coprophilia. It would actually be a very interesting study for one of your pupils.

Freud apparently declined Zweig's suggestion. As Schroeder notes, later psychobiographers seized on the letters as evidence for psychopathological tendencies in Mozart.

Some authors in the 1990s interpreted the material as evidence that Mozart had Tourette syndrome (TS). Simkin catalogued the scatological letters and compared their frequencies with similar vulgarisms from other members of Mozart's family—they are far more frequent. The scatological materials were combined by Simkin with biographical accounts from Mozart's own time that suggested that Mozart had tics characteristic of TS. His claim was picked up by newspapers worldwide, causing an international sensation, and internet websites fueled the speculation.

German psychiatrist Thomas Kammer (2007) states that the work proposing that Mozart had TS has been "promptly and harshly" criticized. The critical commentary asserts both medical misdiagnosis and errors of Mozart scholarship. Kammer concluded that "Tourette's syndrome is an inventive but implausible diagnosis in the medical history of Mozart". Evidence of motor tics was found lacking and the notion that involuntary vocal tics are transferred to the written form was labeled "problematic". Neurologist and author Oliver Sacks published an editorial disputing Simkin's claim, and the Tourette Syndrome Association pointed out the speculative nature of this information. No Tourette's syndrome expert or organization has voiced concurrence that there is credible evidence to conclude that Mozart had Tourette's. One TS specialist stated that "although some websites list Mozart as an individual who had Tourette's or OCD, it's not clear from the descriptions of his behavior that he actually had either".

Coatman, who supports a social and philological explanation of Mozart's scatology, has suggested that such retrospective diagnoses reveal a problem with the perusal of letters as a genre. Following ethicist Osamu Muramoto, she states that "retrospective diagnosis can be challenged not only on an epistemic level but also on the ontological and ethical ones". She notes that by projecting modern sensibilities back onto the letters, scholars from a range of fields have "failed to understand the historical context, language usage of eighteenth-century Salzburg, and indeed, the personality of Mozart".

== Scatological materials ==
=== In letters ===
Benjamin Simkin's compilation lists scatological letters by Mozart to the following individuals:

- his father, Leopold Mozart: twenty letters
- his wife, Constanze Mozart: six letters
- his cousin Maria Anna Thekla Mozart: six letters
- his sister Maria Anna Mozart (Nannerl): four letters
- his mother Anna Maria Mozart: one letter
- his mother and sister jointly: one letter
- his Salzburg friend Abbé Joseph Bullinger: one letter
- his friend, the choirmaster Anton Stoll, for whom he wrote Ave verum corpus: one letter

=== In music ===
The canons were first published after Mozart's death with bowdlerized lyrics; for instance, "Leck mir den Arsch fein rein" ("Lick me in the arse nice and clean") became "Nichts labt mich mehr als Wein" ("Nothing refreshes me more than wine"). In some cases, only the first line of the original scatological lyrics is preserved. The following list is ordered by Köchel catalog number. Voices and conjectured dates are from Zaslaw & Cowdery (1990:101–105); and links marked "score" lead to the online edition of the Neue Mozart-Ausgabe.

- "Leck mich im Arsch" ("Lick me in the arse"), K. 231 (K^{6} 382c), for six voices. (Score). Composed some time in the 1780s. First published as "Lass froh uns sein" ("Let us be joyful").
- "Leck mir den Arsch fein recht schön sauber" ("Lick my arse right well and clean"), K. 233 (K^{6} 382d). (Score). First published as "Nichts labt mich mehr als Wein" ("Nothing pleases me more than wine"). The music of this canon was once thought to be by Mozart but was shown in 1988 by Wolfgang Plath to be by Wenzel Trnka, originally to the Italian words "Tu sei gelosa, è vero". As the editors of the Neue Mozart-Ausgabe note, the work almost certainly should be considered a work of Mozart's, but as the author of the lyrics rather than as the composer.
- "Gehn wir im Prater, gehn wir in d' Hetz", K. 558, for four voices. (Score). 1788 or earlier.
- Difficile lectu mihi Mars, K. 559, for three voices. (Score). C. 1786–1787.
- O du eselhafter Peierl, ("Oh, you asinine Peierl") for four voices, K. 560a. (Score). C. 1786–1787. A slightly revised version, "O du eselhafter Martin", is catalogued as K. 560b.
- "Bona nox" ("Good night") K. 561, for four voices. (Score). 1788 or earlier.

== See also ==
- Toilet humour
- Scatolinguistics
