= Gottfried Weber =

German writer, composer, and jurist (1779–1839)

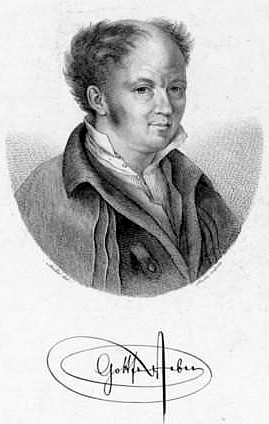
Gottfried Weber

Jacob Gottfried Weber (1 March 1779 – 21 September 1839) was a German writer on music (especially on music theory), composer, and jurist.

== Biography ==
Weber was born at Freinsheim. From 1824 to 1839, he was the editor of Cäcilia, a musical periodical published in Mainz, which influenced musical thought in Germany during the early Romantic era.

His most important work is his Versuch einer geordneten Theorie der Tonsetzkunst ("Theory of Musical Composition") (Mainz: B. Schott, 1817–21), which introduced several concepts that have since become important in the study of music theory. In this work, Weber develops the idea of "Mehrdeutigkeit" (that is, "multiple meaning"), a term initially introduced by Georg Joseph Vogler. Weber's "multiple meaning" refers to individual tones and harmonies, based on their context in a piece of music. For example, a C major triad may serve as I in C major, IV in G major, V in F major, etc. "To analyze a chord, a theorist must ask not only 'What notes are in it?' but also 'How is it behaving in the harmonic progression?'" (Thompson); see diatonic function. In the same work, Weber also further develops Vogler's idea of Roman numeral designations applied to chords. Unlike Vogler, Weber implements upper and lower case symbols to show not only the position of each chord related to the scale degree upon which it is built, but also the quality of each chord, i.e. major, minor, diminished, etc. Weber's Roman numeral system of analysis is in wide use in universities all over the world today to varying degrees, albeit with some modifications.

Weber's Theory of Musical Composition was the first work on music theory to be translated into English for publication in the United States (transl. by James F. Warner, Boston: Oliver Ditson, 1846).

He died in Bad Kreuznach.

== See also ==
- Difficile lectu#First performance, a tale Weber told about Mozart in the pages of Caecilia
