= Ernst von Gemmingen =

German composer and aristocrat

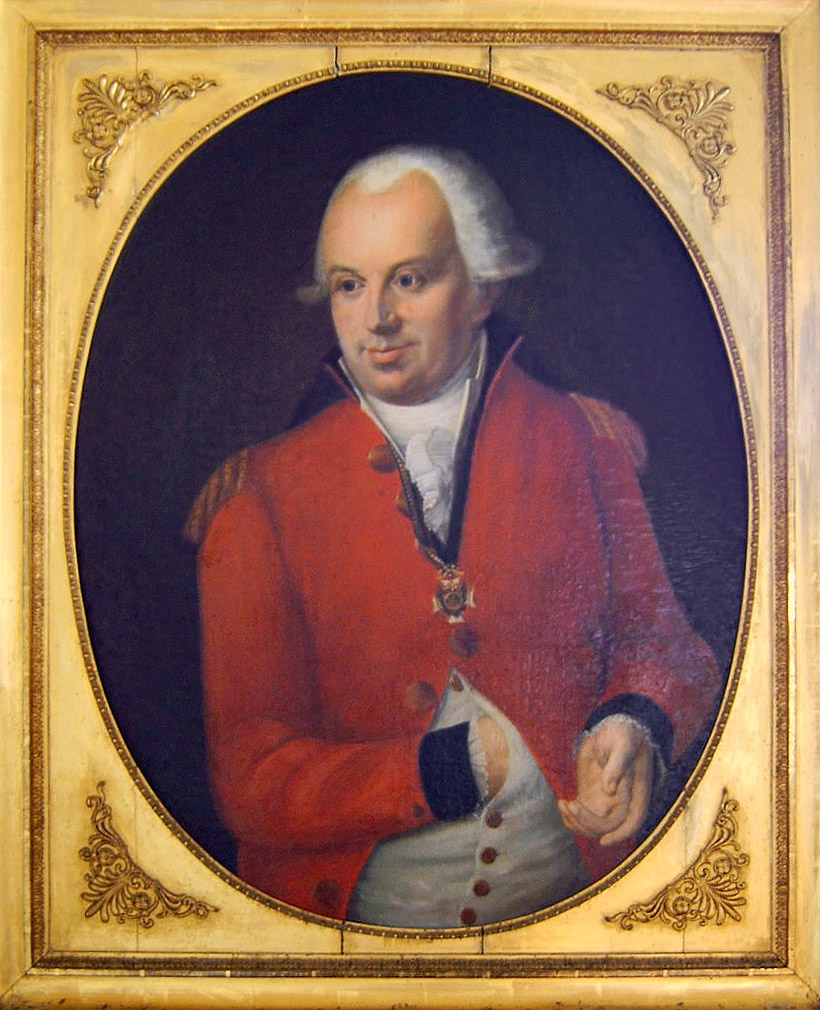
Ernst von Gemmingen

Ernst von Gemmingen (11 February 1759 - 3 March 1813) was a German composer and aristocrat. Born in Celle, von Gemmingen attended the University of Göttingen. He was not a professional composer but was evidently a highly proficient musician. He collected the works of Mozart and Haydn, including a number of first editions. In or around 1800 he composed four concertos for violin and orchestra, his only major extant compositions, the autograph copies of which were discovered in Hornberg Castle, his family's seat, in 1993. The existence of separate orchestral parts for three of the concertos suggests that they were performed in public.
