= Intestinal parasite infection =

Infection of the gastro-intestinal tract

Intestinal parasite
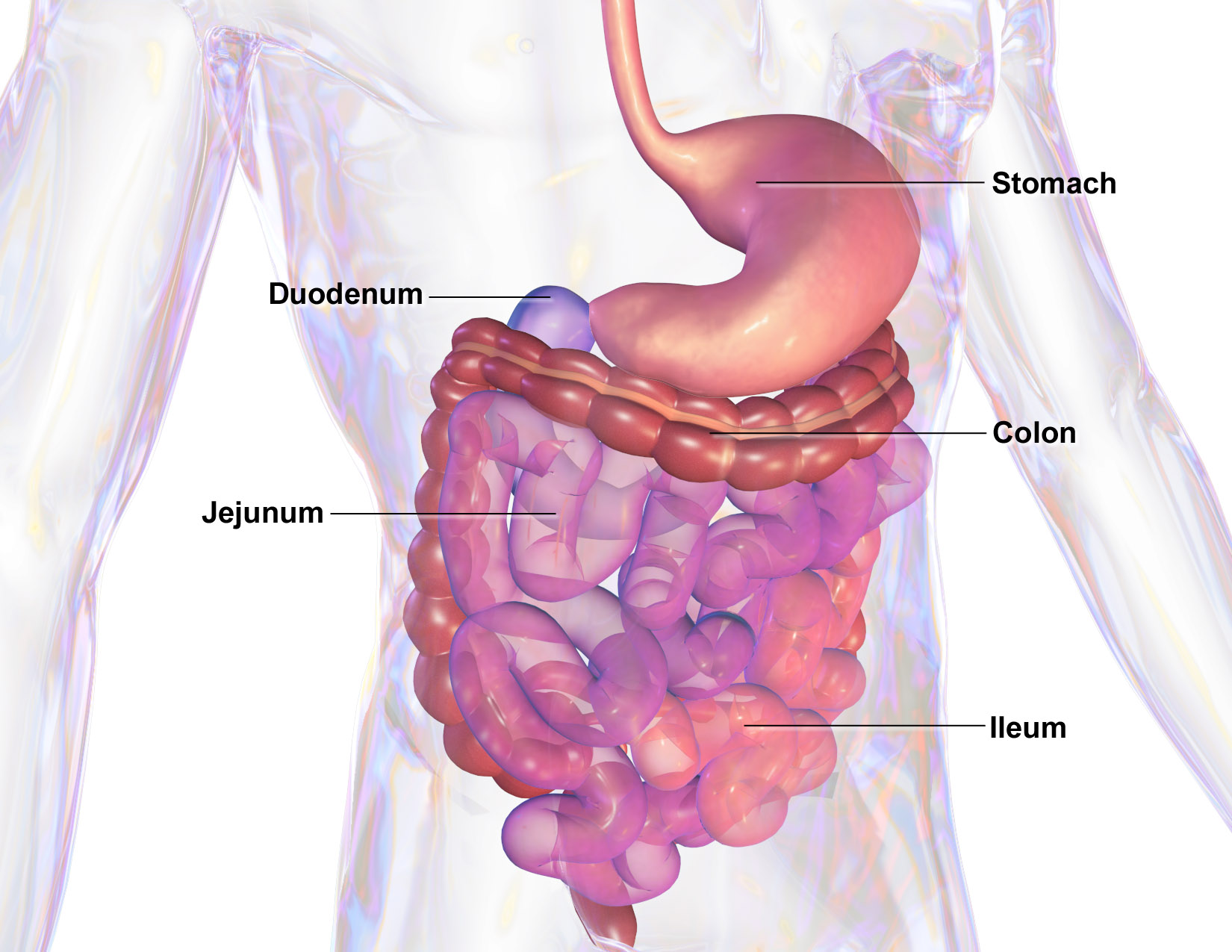
- Human gastro-intestinal system
- Specialty: Infectious disease

An intestinal parasite infection is a condition in which a parasite infects the gastro-intestinal tract of humans and other animals. Such parasites can live anywhere in the body, but most prefer the intestinal wall.

Routes of exposure and infection include ingestion of undercooked meat, drinking infected water, fecal–oral transmission and skin absorption.

Some types of helminths and protozoa are classified as intestinal parasites that cause infection—those that reside in the intestines. These infections can damage or sicken the host (humans or other animals). If the intestinal parasite infection is caused by helminths, the infection is called helminthiasis.

== Signs and symptoms ==
Signs and symptoms depend on the type of infection. Intestinal parasites produce a variety of symptoms in those affected, most of which manifest themselves in gastrointestinal complications and general weakness. Gastrointestinal conditions include inflammation of the small and/or large intestine, diarrhea/dysentery, abdominal pains, and nausea/vomiting. These symptoms negatively impact nutritional status, including decreased absorption of micronutrients, loss of appetite, weight loss, and intestinal blood loss that can often result in anemia. It may also cause physical and mental disabilities, delayed growth in children, and skin irritation around the anus and vulva.

== Cause ==
The prevalence of intestinal parasites is the highest among children that are living in the poorest communities in developing nations. The most common causes of intestinal parasites are through consumption of contaminated water, infected soil, inadequate sanitation and hygiene, and improper hygiene. Specifically, lack of access to facilities for safe disposal of human waste can result in intestinal parasites and disease. Poor hygiene habits or a lack of available hygiene resources, such as hand washing facilities, also negatively impact rates of disease. Parasitic contamination can also occur from eating raw produce, soil-eating behaviour, and low availability of safe drinking water.

Parasites can get into the intestines by going through the mouth from uncooked or unwashed food, contaminated water or hands, or by skin contact with larva infected soil; they can also be transferred by the sexual act of anilingus in some cases. When the organisms are swallowed, they move into the intestines, where they can reproduce and cause symptoms. Children are particularly susceptible if they are not thoroughly cleaned after coming into contact with infected soil that is present in environments that they may frequently visit, such as sandboxes and school playgrounds. People in developing countries are also at particular risk due to drinking water from sources that may be contaminated with parasites that colonize the gastrointestinal tract.

== Diagnosis ==
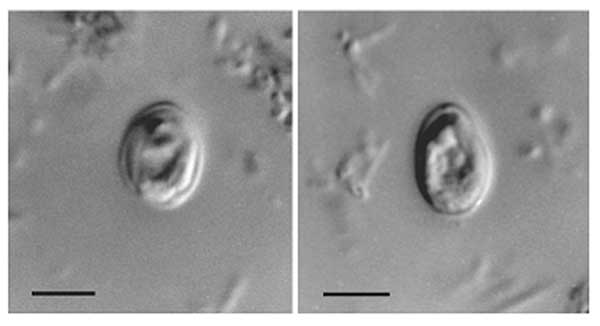
Cryptosporidium muris

Due to the wide variety of intestinal parasites, a description of the symptoms is rarely sufficient for diagnosis. Instead, medical personnel use one of two common tests: they search stool samples for the parasites, or apply an adhesive to the anus to search for eggs.

=== Types ===
Major groups of parasites include protozoans (organisms having only one cell) and parasitic worms (helminths). Of these, protozoans, including cryptosporidium, microsporidia, and isospora, are most common in HIV-infected persons. Each of these parasites can infect the digestive tract, and sometimes two or more can cause infection at the same time.

== Prevention ==
Good hygiene is necessary to avoid reinfection. The Rockefeller Foundation's hookworm campaign in Mexico in the 1920s was extremely effective at eliminating hookworm from humans with the use of anthelmintics. However, preventative measures were not adequately introduced to the people who were treated. Therefore, the rate of reinfection was extremely high, and the project evaluated through any sort of scientific method was a marked failure. More education was needed to inform the people of the importance of wearing shoes, using latrines (better access to sanitation), and good hygiene.

Intestinal parasite prevention methods are not isolated to specific geographical areas; however, many of the research-based interventions have primarily taken place in underdeveloped countries and regions, where sanitation is a large concern for spreading disease.Current best practice behaviors that prevent intestinal parasites include: using proper hand washing practices, using correctly-built latrines with ample ventilation, having a piped water source, and wearing shoes. Currently, in some parts of Ethiopia where disease prevalence is high, up to 80% of people in a population lack access to washing facilities. While this is high, 93% did have access to a latrine, but only 29.2% of those latrines had proper construction to decrease parasitic infections. Behavioral interventions have focused on promoting washing, sometimes with soap, in the context of education at schools and child care facilities. In recent studies, the best interventions follow a multidisciplinary approach by:

- Increasing environmental sanitation to promote hand washing and shoe-wearing habits
- Educating children at a young age at school and at home

Specific evidence-based interventions that may lower disease prevalence include:

- Interventions at schools, focusing on the construction of pit latrines (ventilated and improved), providing clean drinking water and educating the students about hygiene
- The SAFE (surgery, antibiotics, facial cleanliness, environmental sanitation) strategy to address trachoma, primarily the facial cleanliness and the environmental sanitation components
- Hand-washing with soap at critical times and nail clipping to decrease reinfection rates, although further research is needed to develop and implement similar interventions at scale
- Programs combining anthelmintic drug administration with interventions to increase environmental sanitation (such as decreasing fecal contamination)

== Treatment ==
Praziquantel

Drugs are frequently used to kill parasites in the host. In earlier times, turpentine was often used for this, but modern drugs do not poison intestinal worms directly. Rather, anthelmintic drugs now inhibit an enzyme that is necessary for the worm to make the substance that prevents the worm from being digested.

For example, tapeworms are usually treated with a medicine taken by mouth. The most commonly used medicine for tapeworms is praziquantel.
