= Hornberg Castle (Neckarzimmern) =

Castle in Neckarzimmern, Germany

- Burg Hornberg
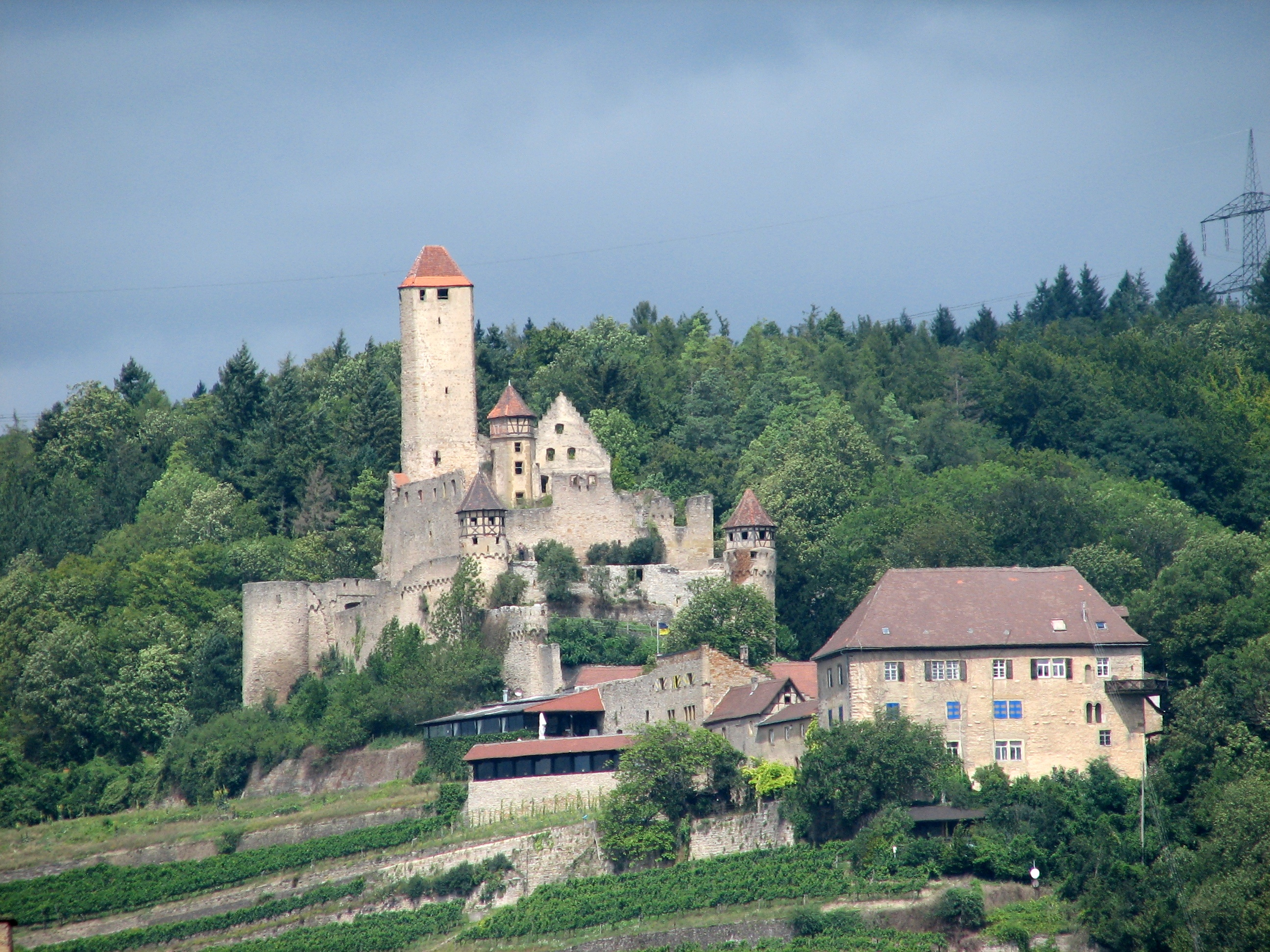

Site information
- Type: Castle
- Open to the public: Yes

Location
- Coordinates: 49°18′50″N 9°08′45″E

Site history
- Built: 11th century

Hornberg Castle (German: Burg Hornberg) is a partially ruined castle located on a steep outcrop above the Neckar valley above the village Neckarzimmern, between Bad Wimpfen and Mosbach. It is the largest and oldest of the castles in the valley.

== History ==
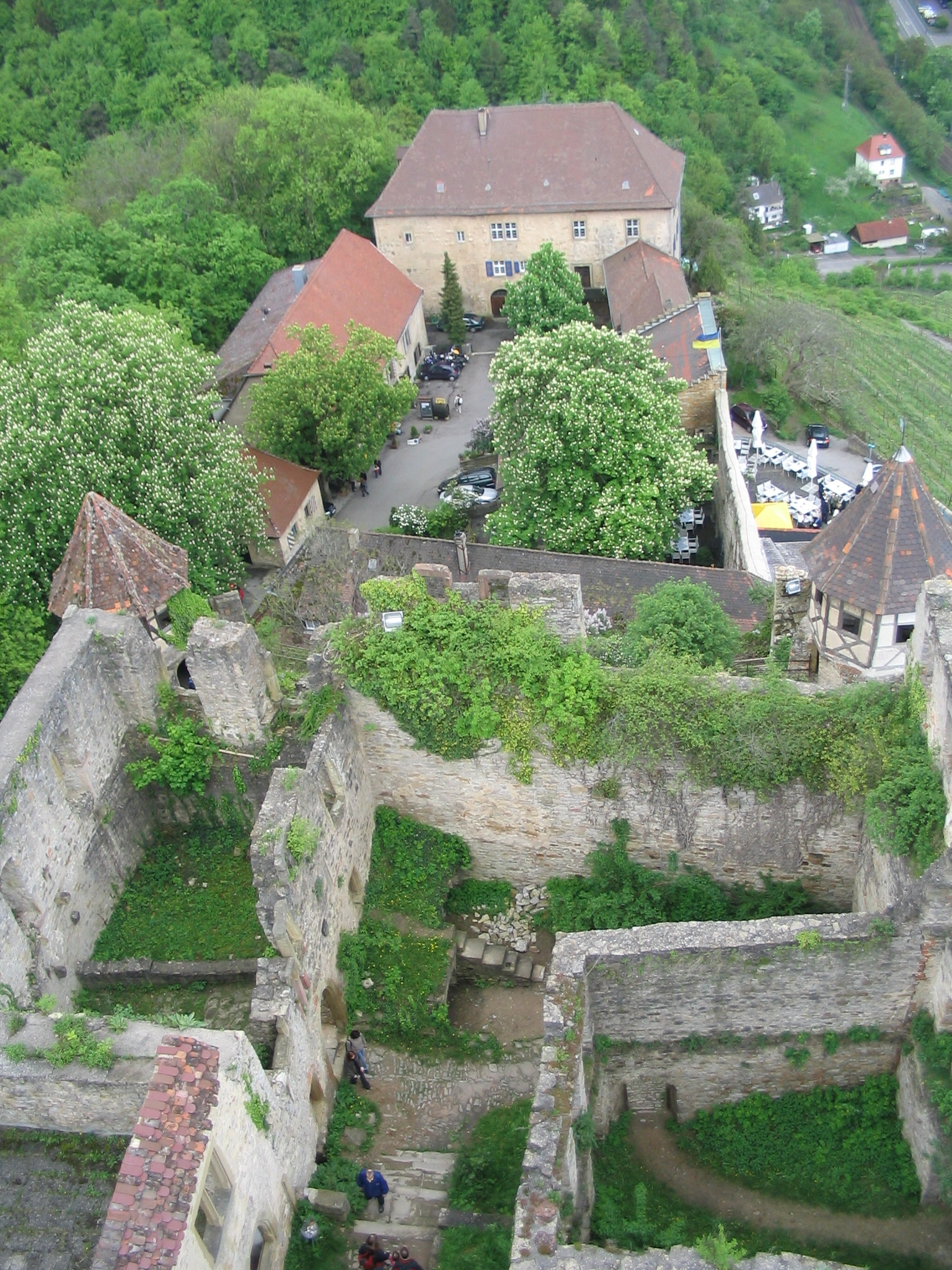
Overview of the Castle

The original castle was built in the 11th century. It is notable as the stronghold of Götz von Berlichingen, who bought it in 1517 and died there in 1562. The castle was bought by Reinhard of Gemmingen in 1612 and remains in possession of the Gemmingen-Hornberg family today. It was uninhabited from 1738 and left to decay until 1825, when it was partially restored. It has housed a museum since 1968.

It also housed students from the University of Wisconsin–Stevens Point College of Natural Resources for an annual summer exchange program.

== See also ==
- List of castles in Baden-Württemberg
