= Neckarzimmern =

- Municipality
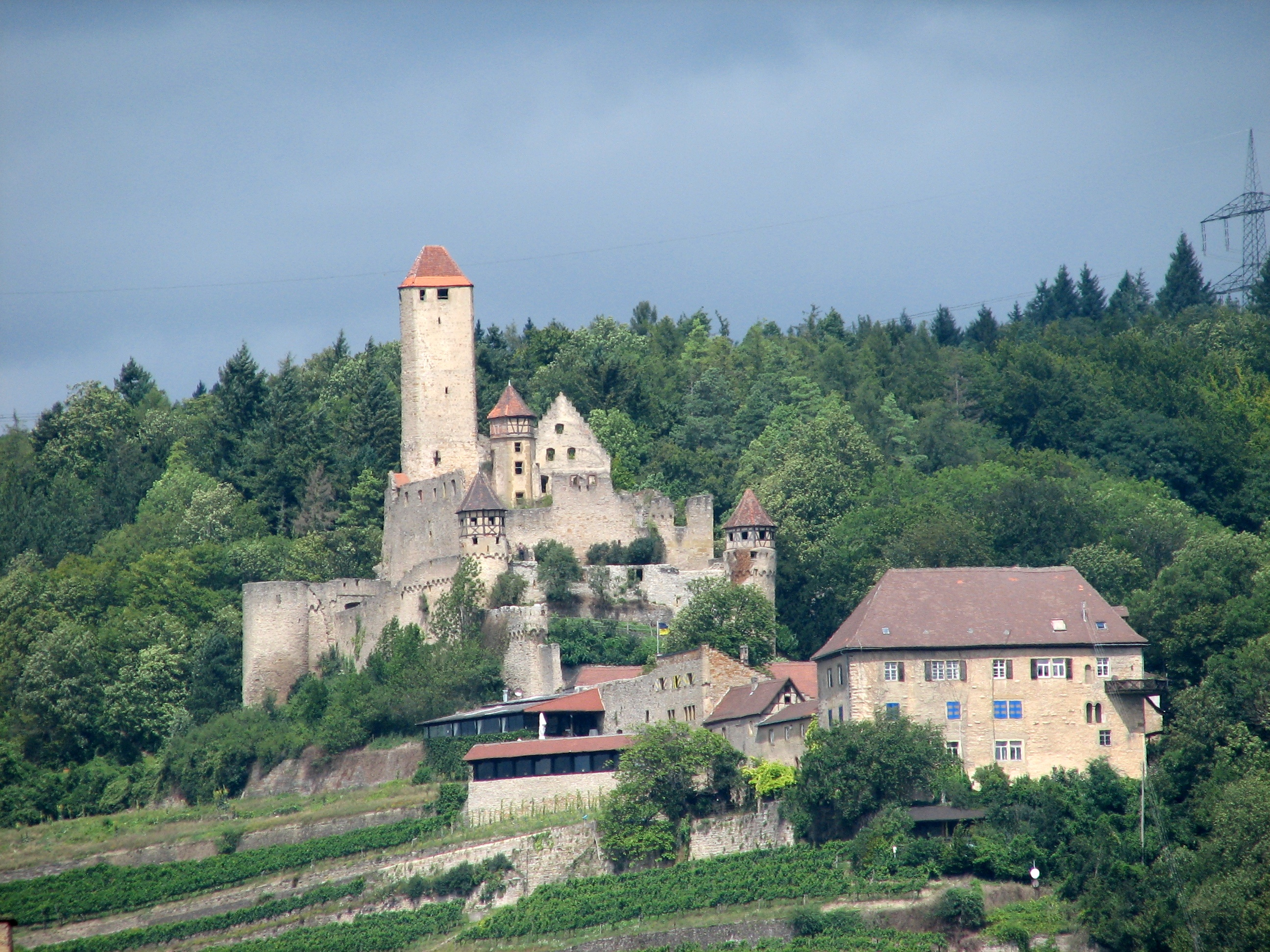
- Hornberg Castle

- Coat of arms

- Location of Neckarzimmern within Neckar-Odenwald-Kreis district
- Interactive map of Neckarzimmern
- Location within Germany Location within Baden-Württemberg
- Coordinates: 49°19′6″N 9°7′57″E
- Country: Germany
- State: Baden-Württemberg
- Admin. region: Karlsruhe
- District: Neckar-Odenwald-Kreis

Government
  - Mayor (2022–30): Christian Stuber (Ind.)

Area
  - Total: 8.18 km^{2} (3.16 sq mi)
- Elevation: 160 m (520 ft)

Population (2025-12-31)
  - Total: 1,415
  - Density: 173/km^{2} (448/sq mi)
- Time zone: UTC+01:00 (CET)
  - Summer (DST): UTC+02:00 (CEST)
- Postal codes: 74865
- Dialling codes: 06261
- Vehicle registration: MOS, BCH
- Website: www.neckarzimmern.de

Neckarzimmern is a municipality in the district of Neckar-Odenwald-Kreis, in Baden-Württemberg, Germany. Neckarzimmern also was the main site of dispersal for the German Anti-Friction Bearings Industry during the Allied bombing of Germany. This site was chosen because an abandoned mine provided excellent protection for the machinery. Most of the machines that were transferred here were from the Schweinfurt factory.

== Demographics ==
Population development:

Year	Inhabitants
1990	1,676
2001	1,567
2011	1,539
2021	1,469

== Sons and Daughters of the Community ==
- Emil Stumpp (1886-1941), press drawer

== Other persons associated with the place ==
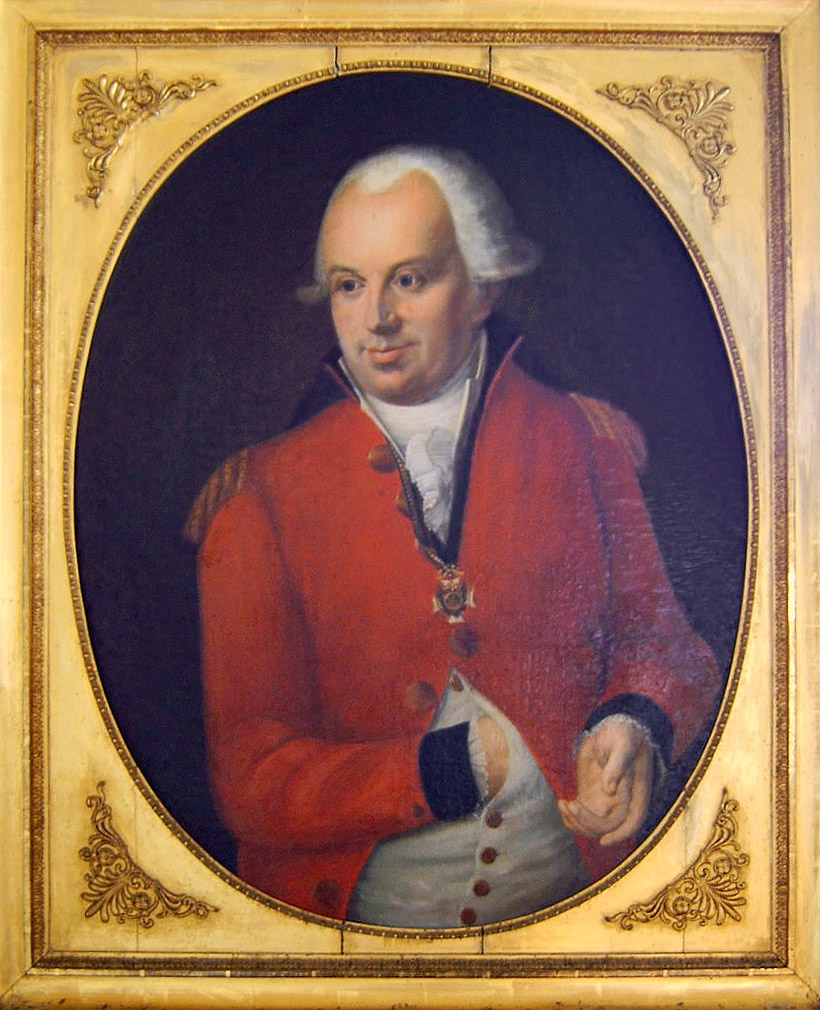
Ernst von Gemmingen

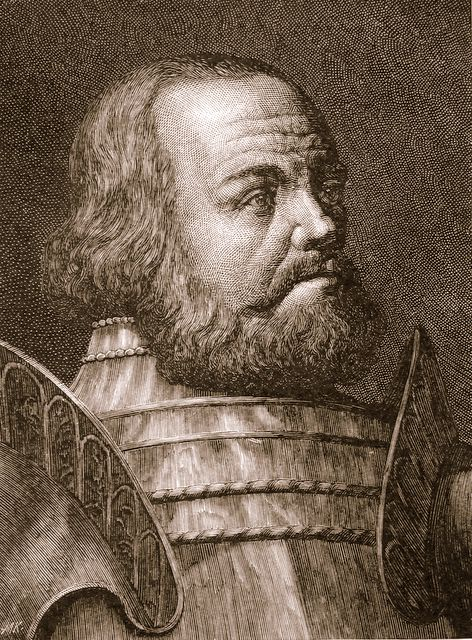
Götz von Berlichingen

- Ernst von Gemmingen (1759-1813), composer and aristocrat
- Götz von Berlichingen († 1562), owner of Burg Hornberg
