= O du eselhafter Peierl =

1788 canon in 4 voices by W. A. Mozart

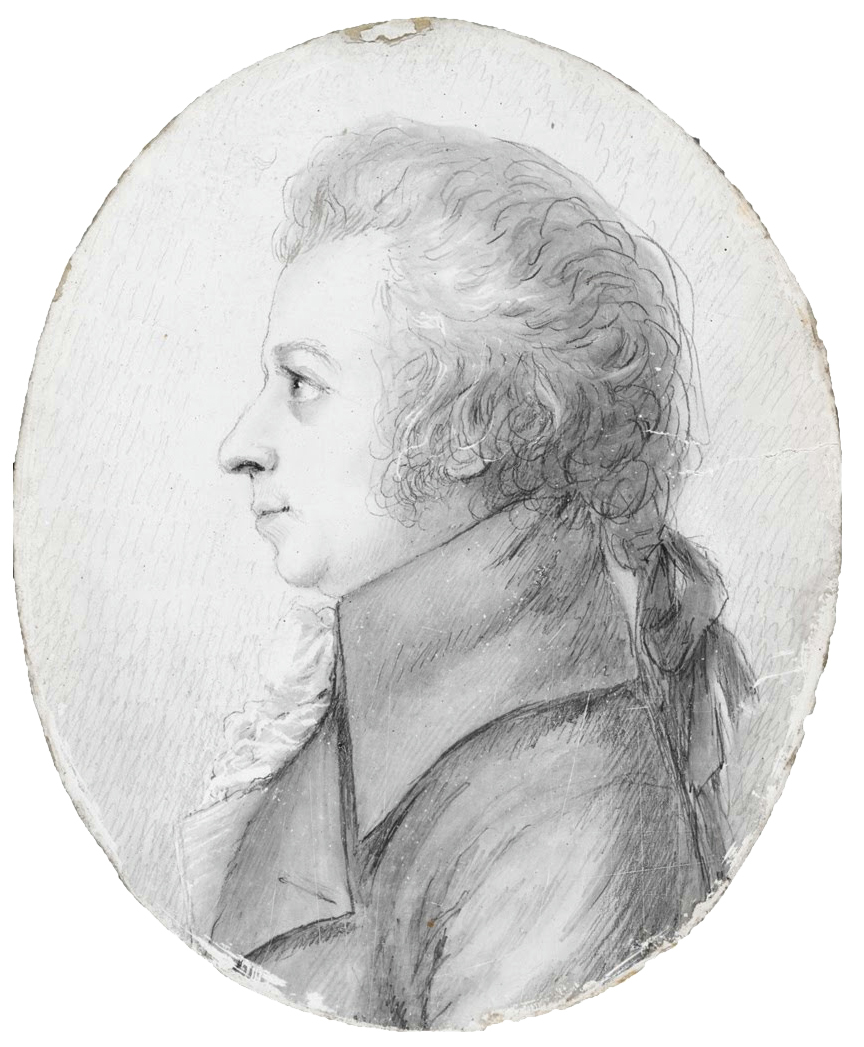
Dora Stock's 1789 miniature of Mozart

"O du eselhafter Peierl", K. 559a, is a canon composed by Wolfgang Amadeus Mozart. The music, originally in F major, is set for four singers. The words are probably by Mozart himself.

== Origin ==
The work was written sometime between 1785 and 1787. (Note: The evidence for this is that the singer for whom the canon was written, Johann Nepomuk Peierl, was resident in Vienna only during this time.) On 2 September 1788, Mozart entered it into his personal catalog of works as part of a set of ten canons. Although some of the canons in the set of ten have serious (that is, religious) lyrics, K. 559a was meant for fun, a gesture of mocking, scatological humor directed at a friend of Mozart's, the baritone Johann Nepomuk Peyerl (1761–1800). The canon begins:

O, du eselhafter Peierl
O, du peierlhafter Esel

Oh, you asinine Peierl
oh you Peierline ass. (Note: Here, "ass", translating "Esel", means "donkey"; as an insult it might also be translated "jackass". (Although, to translate it thus here would make the similarity between "asinine Peierl" and "Peierline ass" less apparent).) (Note: "Arse" is the British English version of the American English word "ass" meaning buttocks. In both British and American English, the word "ass" is also, distinctly, an insult meaning donkey (equivalent to the insult "jackass". As this canon discusses both Arsch and Esel, the term "arse" has been used in translation when the bottom meaning is intended and the term "ass" has been used when the donkey meaning is intended.)

Later, the lyrics include "O leck mich doch geschwind im Arsch" ("Oh lick me real quick in the arse"), a favorite expression in Mozart's scatological works. For more examples and discussion, see Mozart and scatology.

"O du eselhafter Peierl" was originally intended to be sung immediately following "Difficile lectu", which humiliated Peierl by forcing him to pronounce fake Latin words that also sounded like leck du mi im Arsch (lick me in the ass). For the tale of how these two canons originated, see "Difficile lectu".

Zaslaw and Cowdery (1990) express admiration for the work, saying "it makes brilliant use of imitative and hocket-like devices" and "possesses the clockwork-like vocal interplay of a well-wrought opera buffa ensemble."

== Revised version ==
Mozart later transposed "O du eselhafter Peierl" into G major, in versions that replaced "Peierl" with the names of two other individuals, named Martin and Jakob. There are other minor differences in words and notes.

According to Link (2007), "Martin" was the composer Vicente Martín y Soler. Mozart scholar Alfred Einstein suggested a different hypothesis, that "Martin" was Philipp Jakob Martin, who served as impresario for Mozart's concerts in the Mehlgrube and in the Augarten. The lyrics of the revised canon replace "Nepomuk" (see above) with "Lipperl", a German diminutive form of "Philipp".

== Autographs ==
The autograph (original manuscript copy) of K. 559a has survived; it is a "tiny slip of paper" (Searle) on the reverse side of which is the original of K. 559. For discussion, see Difficile lectu. The later G major version, K. 560, is also preserved and is currently in the Mozarteum in Salzburg.

== Lyrics ==
Original F major version, K. 559a.

O du eselhafter Peierl!
o du peierlhafter Esel!
du bist so faul als wie ein Gaul,
der weder Kopf noch Haxen hat.
Mit dir ist gar nichts anzufangen;
ich seh dich noch am Galgen hangen.
Du dummer Gaul, du bist so faul,
du dummer Peierl bist so faul als wie ein Gaul.
O lieber Freund, ich bitte dich,
o leck mich doch geschwind im Arsch!
Ach, lieber Freund, verzeihe mir,
den Arsch, den Arsch petschier ich dir
Peierl! Nepomuk! Peierl! verzeihe mir!

O, you asinine Peierl!
O, you Peierline ass!
You're as idle as a nag
with neither head nor legs!
There's nothing to be done with you
I'll see you hanged yet.
You stupid nag, you're so idle
You stupid Peierl, you're idle as a nag
Oh dear friend, I beg you
Oh kiss (Note: "Leck" is literally "lick"; "kiss" forms a more idiomatic English translation.) my arse real quick!
Oh dear friend, forgive me,
I'm going to whip your arse.
Nepomuk! Peierl! Forgive me!

Revised G major version, K. 560.

O du eselhafter [Jakob|Martin]!
o du [Jakobischer|Martinischer] Esel!
du bist so faul als wie ein Gaul,
der weder Kopf noch Haxen hat.
Mit dir ist gar nichts anzufangen;
ich seh dich noch am Galgen hangen.
Du dummer Paul, halt du nurs Maul,
Ich scheiß dir aufs Maul, so hoff' ich wirst doch erwachen.
O lieber Lipperl, ich bitte dich recht schön,
o leck mich doch geschwind im Arsch!
O, lieber Freund, verzeihe mir,
den Arsch, den Arsch petschier ich dir.
Lipperl! [Jakob|Martin]! Lipperl! verzeihe mir!

O, you asinine [Jakob|Martin]!
O, you [Jakobite|Martinine] ass!
You're as idle as a nag
with neither head nor legs!
There's nothing to be done with you
I'll see you hanged yet.
You stupid Paul, shut your trap.
I'll shit on your mouth, (Note: "Maul" means "mouth" but is said only of animals.) I hope that wakes you up.
Oh dear Lipperl, I ask you so sweetly
Oh kiss my arse real quick!
Oh dear friend, forgive me,
I'm going to whip your arse.
Lipperl! [Jakob|Martin]! Lipperl! Forgive me!

== See also ==
- Bona nox
- Leck mich im Arsch
- Leck mir den Arsch fein recht schön sauber
