= Bona nox =

1788 canon in 4 voices by W. A. Mozart

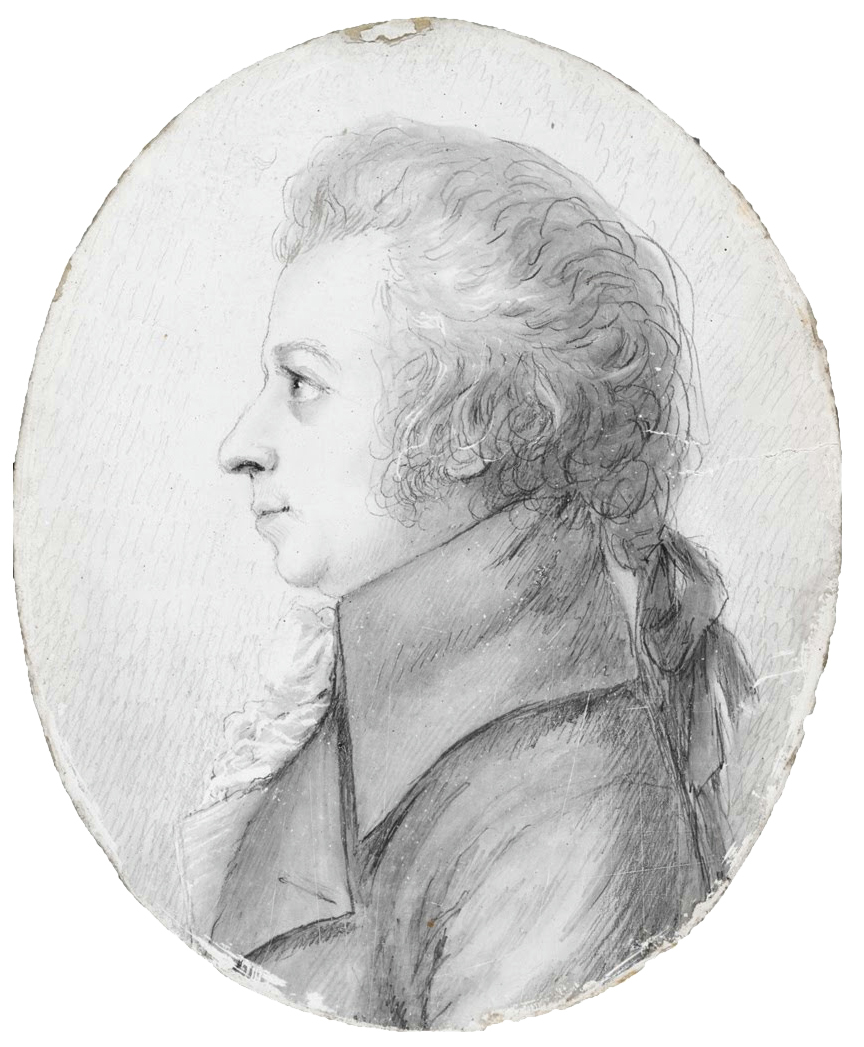
Dora Stock's 1789 miniature of Mozart

Bona nox! bist a rechta Ox, K. 561, is a canon in A major for four voices a cappella by Wolfgang Amadeus Mozart; Mozart entered this work into his personal catalogue on 1788 as part of a set of ten canons.

== Music ==
The canon is written in the time signature of cut common time and in the key signature of A major. The theme is 16 bars long; each of the four voices enters after four bars.

== Text ==
The original lyrics are probably by Mozart himself; they include the words for "good night" in five different languages (Latin, Italian, French, English, and German). The phrase "gute Nacht, gute Nacht, / scheiß ins Bett daß' kracht", found in the fourth-to-last and third-to-last lines, closely resembles a similar expression found in a postscript to one of Wolfgang's letters by his mother, written 26 September 1777 to his father; also in Mozart's letter from 7 July 1770 to his sister.

"Bona nox! bist a rechta Ox" (MIDI rendition)

Original version

Bona nox!
bist a rechta Ochs;
bona notte,
liebe Lotte;
bonne nuit,
pfui, pfui;
good night, good night,
heut müßma noch weit;
gute Nacht, gute Nacht,
scheiß ins Bett daß' kracht;
gute Nacht, schlaf fei g'sund
und reck' den Arsch zum Mund.

Good night! [Latin]
You are quite an ox;
Good night, [Italian]
My dear Lotte;
Good night, [French]
Phooey, phooey;
Good night, good night, [English]
We still have far to go today;
Good night, good night,
Shit your bed so hard it explodes; []
Good night, sleep tight,
And stick your ass to your mouth. []

Partially expurgated version

Bona nox!
bist a rechter Ochs,
bona notte,
liebe Lotte;
bonne nuit,
pfui, pfui;
good night, good night,
heut' müßma noch weit;
gute Nacht, gute Nacht,
's wird höchste Zeit, gute Nacht,
schlaf' fei g'sund und
bleib' recht kugelrund.

Bona nox!
You're quite an ox;
Good night,
My dear Lotte;
Good night,
Fie, fie;
Good night, good night,
We still have far to go today;
Good night, good night,
'Tis highest time, good night,
Sleep very well and
Stay perfectly rotund.

Completely expurgated version

Gute Nacht!
bis der Tag erwacht!
Alle Sorgen,
ruht bis morgen!
Euch gute Nacht!
Schlaf wohl!
schliess(t) nur die Augen (jetzt) zu,
schlaf mein Liebchen,
fein sanft, schlaf in guter Ruh,
gute Nacht!
Schlaft fein süss,
bis nun der Tag erwacht!

Good night!
Until the morning breaks!
All you sorrows,
Rest till morrow!
Good night to you!
Sleep well!
Close the eyes now fast,
Sleep, my darling,
Very gently, sleep resting well,
Good night!
Have sweet dreams,
Until the morning breaks!

== Reception ==
The completely expurgated version found widespread distribution in traditional German Hausmusik.

== See also ==
- Other canons which Mozart also entered on the 2 September 1788 into his catalogue are: "Difficile lectu mihi Mars", K. 559, and "O du eselhafter Peierl", K. 560a; other canons which also use a similarly robust language are "Leck mich im Arsch", K. 231, and "Leck mir den Arsch fein recht schön sauber", K. 233.
- Mozart and scatology
