= Difficile lectu =

1788 canon in 3 voices by W. A. Mozart

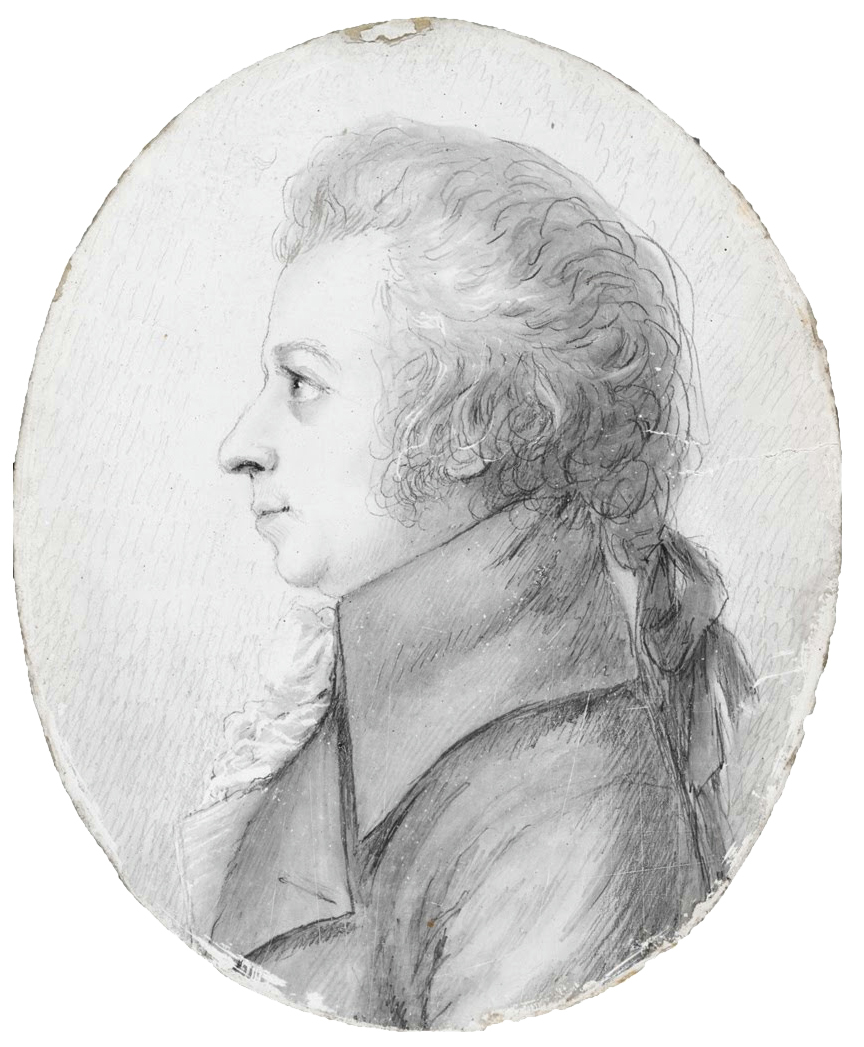
Dora Stock's 1789 miniature of Mozart

"Difficile lectu", K. 559, is a canon composed by Wolfgang Amadeus Mozart. The music, in F major, is set for three singers. The words are most likely written by Mozart himself.

The work was entered by the composer into his personal catalog on 2 September 1788 as part of a set of ten canons; it was probably written some time during the years 1786–87.

== Text ==
Although some of the canons in this 1788 set contain religious texts, K. 559 was evidently meant entirely for fun. The work features two bilingual puns and some scatological humor. The lyrics are—ostensibly—in Latin, but they do not make sense in this language: Difficile lectu mihi mars et jonicu difficile. The humor of the work consists of hearing these words instead as vulgar phrases of German and Italian.

According to one theory, the German pun is based on the strong Bavarian accent of the tenor-baritone Johann Nepomuk Peyerl (1761–1800), who can be presumed to have been the lead singer in the first performance (see below). As Jean-Victor Hocquard points out, the pseudo-Latin lyrics lectu mihi mars, as Peyerl would have sung them, resemble Bavarian German leck du mi im Arsch, which in a literal English rendering is "[you] lick me in the arse". More idiomatically, the phrase could be translated "kiss my arse" (American English "kiss my ass"). The second pun in the canon is based on the single Latin word jonicu. Emanuel Winternitz explains that when this word is sung repeatedly and rapidly, as in the canon, its syllables are liable to be heard as the Italian word cujoni, or in modern writing coglioni, meaning "balls, testicles". The line thus translates as "It is difficult to lick my arse and balls".

Michael Quinn writes, "Mozart clearly relished the incongruity resulting from ribald verse set as a canon, traditionally regarded as the most learned of all compositional techniques."

== First performance ==
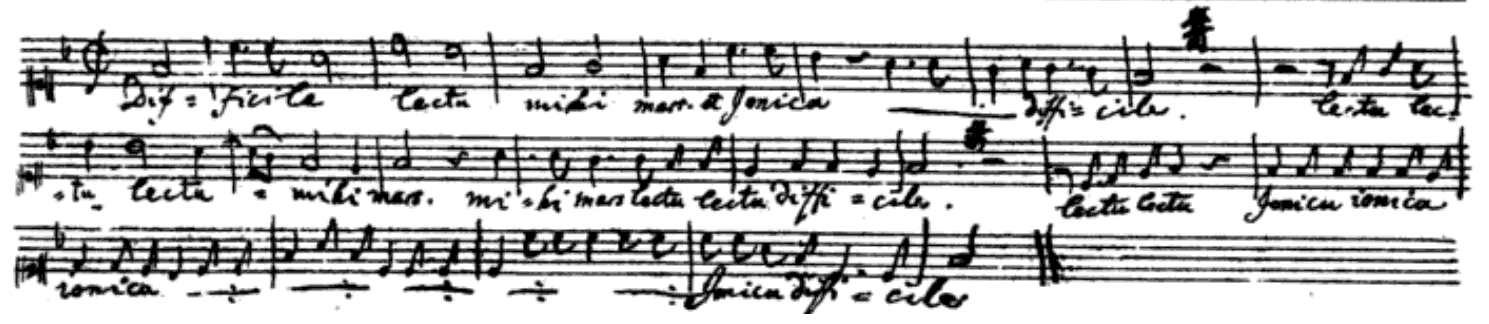
Autograph score (facsimile published by Gottfried Weber)

A tale concerning how the canon was composed and first sung was offered by Gottfried Weber, a musicologist and editor of the early 19th century. In an 1824 issue of Caecilia, the journal he edited, Weber published a facsimile of the original manuscript of the canon (see figure). In his commentary, Weber included the following.

The story is as follows. The otherwise outstanding Peierl had a number of remarkable idiosyncrasies of pronunciation, which Mozart often poked fun of in friendly interactions with him and with other friends. One evening, at a merry gathering, Mozart had the idea of writing a canon in which the few Latin words "Difficile lectu" etc. would emerge in Peyerl's pronunciation in a comical way, with the expectation that he would not notice this and would be fooled. At the same time, on the reverse side of the same sheet of paper Mozart wrote the mocking canon "O du eselhafter Peierl" ("Oh, you asinine Peierl"), K. 560a. The joke succeeded. After the strange Latin words had emerged from Peyerl's mouth in the anticipated comical way—to the satisfaction of all present—Mozart turned over the page, and had the group, instead of applauding, sing the triumphal mocking canon "O du eselhafter Peierl".

Weber does not say where his story came from.

== Autograph ==
The autograph (original manuscript copy, shown above) has survived; it is a "tiny slip of paper" on the reverse side of which is—as Weber noted—the original copy of K. 560a. In a number of places the lyrics are blurry and difficult to read, a condition Weber attributed to stray droplets of champagne.

A nineteenth-century scholar, thought perhaps to be Weber, repaired the manuscript by attaching new paper to its right edge, and on the added material wrote "Originalhandschrift von Mozart", that is, "original manuscript by Mozart". The manuscript can be traced through various auctions in Germany in the late 19th and early 20th centuries. In 1922 it became part of the collections of the Austrian author Stefan Zweig, and in 1986 was given along with the rest of Zweig's collections to the British Library, where it currently resides.

A sketch for K. 559 is also preserved; its existence suggests that, contrary to what Weber recounted, Mozart must have planned his joke in advance. Both the autograph and the sketch can be viewed at the NMA website; see External links below. The sketch was sold by the Sotheby's auction house in 2011 for £361,250.

== See also ==
- More scatological canons:
  - Leck mich im Arsch
  - Leck mir den Arsch fein recht schön sauber
  - Bona nox
- Mozart and scatology
- Joseph Leutgeb, another friend Mozart teased

== Notes ==
=== Sources ===
- Copeman, Harold; Scheer, Vera U. G. (1996). "German Latin". In Timothy McGee (ed.). Singing Early Music – The Pronunciation of European Languages in the Late Middle Ages and Renaissance. Vol. 1. Bloomington: Indiana University Press. ISBN 9780253210265.
- Hocquard, Jean-Victor (1999). Mozart ou la voix du comique (in French). Maisonneuve & Larose. p. 203. ISBN 978-2706813924.
- Quinn, Michael (2007). "Canon". In Cliff Eisen; Simon P. Keefe (eds.). The Cambridge Mozart Encyclopedia. Cambridge: Cambridge University Press.
- Searle, Arthur (November 1986). "Stefan Zweig Collection". Early Music. 14 (4): 616–618. JSTOR 3127545.
- Weber, Gottfried (1824). "Originalhandschrift von Mozart" [Original manuscript of Mozart]. Cäcilia (in German). 1: 179–182 – via Google Books.
- Winternitz, Emanuel (Summer–Autumn 1958). "Gnagflow Trazom: An Essay on Mozart's Script, Pastimes, and Nonsense Letters". Journal of the American Musicological Society. 11 (2/3): 200–216. doi:10.2307/829906. JSTOR 829906. 'Gnagflow Trazom' is 'Wolfgang Mozart' written backwards.
