= Emanuel Winternitz =

Austrian museum curator (1898 – 1983)

Emanuel Winternitz (4 August 1898 in Vienna, Austria – 20 August 1983 in New York City) was an Austrian-born museum professional who became the first curator of the Department of Musical Instruments at the Metropolitan Museum of Art in New York City.

== Career ==
Born in Vienna, then capital of the Austro-Hungarian empire, Austria, Winternitz served in World War I. He then practiced law in Vienna in the 1920s and 1930s.

Winternitz emigrated to the United States in 1938, after the Anschluss. In 1941, He started work at the Metropolitan as a lecturer. He became "Keeper" of the instruments the following year, and was named Curator in 1949 when Musical Instruments was made a curatorial department.

At the Department of Musical Instruments, Winternitz was responsible for saving the musical instruments collection from a plan to turn them over to a Music Library proposed by Juilliard. He was also a musical instruments researcher, credited as the "father of the field of musical iconography".

In 1973 Winternitz was named curator emeritus at the museum. He continued to teach at the Graduate Center of the City University of New York until his death.
