= Götz von Berlichingen =

German feudal knight (1480–1562)

Reichsritter Götz von Berlichingen
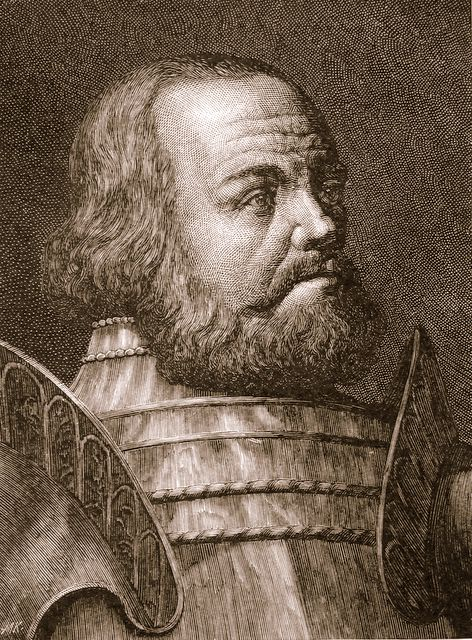
- Götz von Berlichingen, 17th century engraving
- Born: 15 November 1480; Burg Jagsthausen, County of Württemberg, Holy Roman Empire
- Died: 23 July 1562 (aged 81); Hornberg Castle, Electoral Palatinate, Holy Roman Empire
- Resting place: Schöntal Abbey, Schöntal, Germany
- Other name: Gottfried von Berlichingen
- Occupations: Imperial Knight; Mercenary
- Years active: 1497–1544
- Known for: His iron prosthetic hand, inventing the phrase "lick my ass"
- Children: Hans Jakob von Berlichingen
- Parents: Kilian von Berlichingen (father); Margarete von Thüngen (mother)

Signature
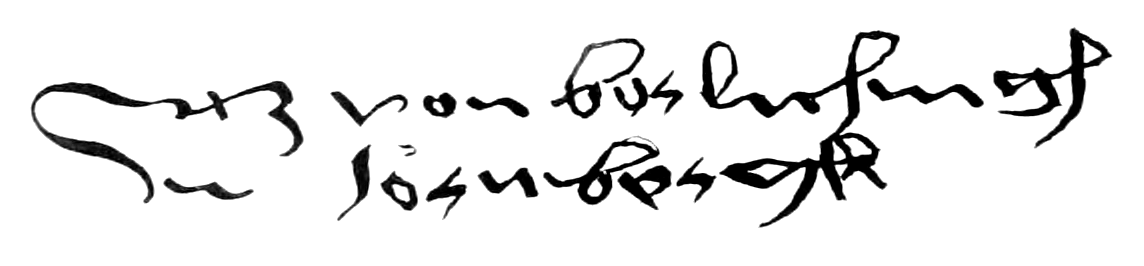

Gottfried "Götz" von Berlichingen zu Hornberg (pronounced [ˈgɔtfʁiːd fɔn ˈbɛʁlɪçɪŋən], [ˈgœts]; 15 November 1480 – 23 July 1562), also known as Götz of the Iron Fist (German: Eisenfaust), was a German (Franconian) Imperial Knight (Reichsritter), mercenary, and poet. He was born around 1480 into the noble family of Berlichingen in modern-day Baden-Württemberg. Götz bought Hornberg Castle (Neckarzimmern) in 1517, and lived there until his death in 1562.

He was active in numerous military campaigns during a period of 47 years from 1498 to 1544, including the German Peasants' War, besides numerous feuds; in his autobiography he estimates that he fought 15 feuds in his own name, besides many cases where he lent assistance to his friends, including feuds against the cities of Cologne, Ulm, Augsburg and the Swabian League, as well as the bishop of Bamberg.

His name became famous as a euphemism for the vulgar expression (also known as the Swabian Salute): "Er kann mich am Arsch lecken" (lit: He can lick my ass). This saying was attributed to him by writer and poet Johann Wolfgang von Goethe (1749–1832), who wrote a play based on his life.

== Life ==
In 1497, Berlichingen entered the service of Frederick I, Margrave of Brandenburg-Ansbach. In 1498, he fought in the armies of Holy Roman Emperor Maximilian I, seeing action in Burgundy, Lorraine, and the Brabant, and in the Swabian War the following year. By 1500, Berlichingen had left the service of Frederick of Brandenburg, and formed a company of mercenaries, selling his services to various dukes, margraves, and barons.

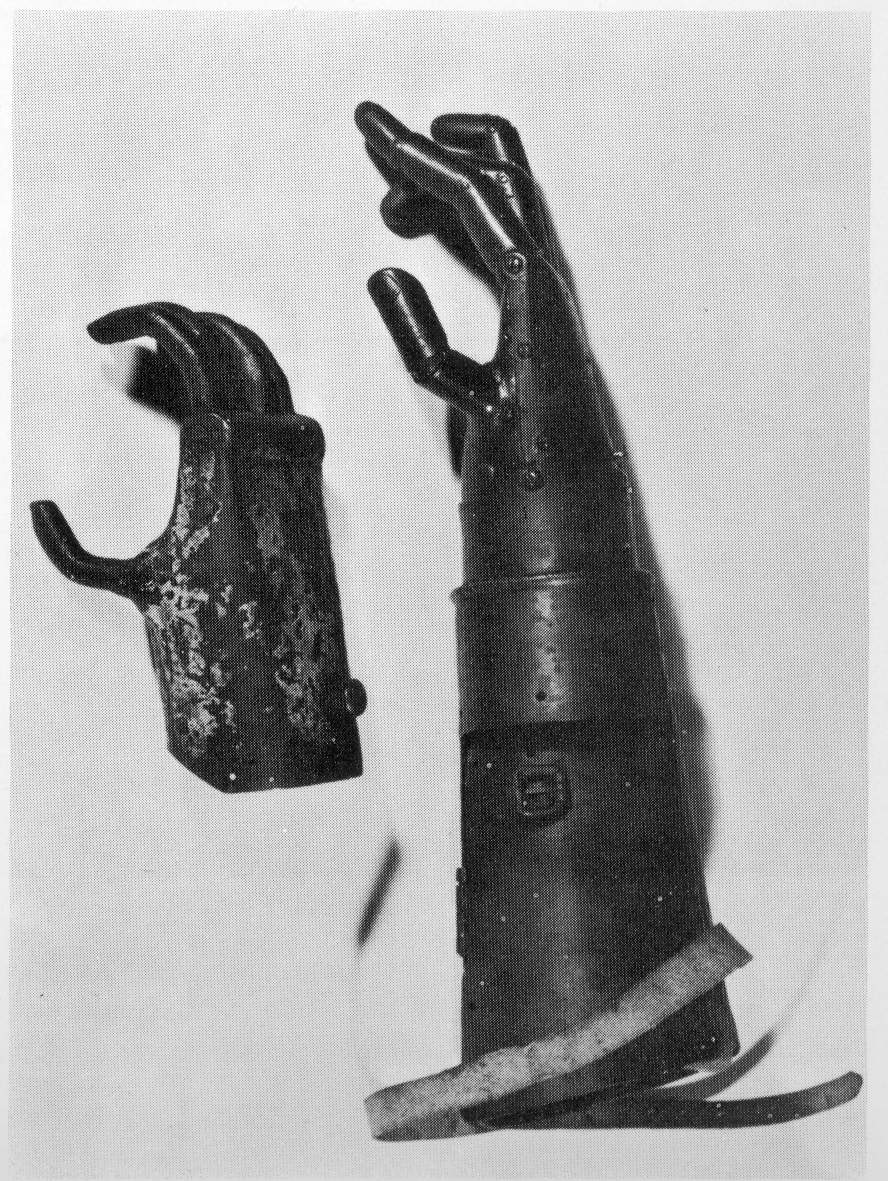
The two iron prosthetic hands, on display at Jagsthausen Castle

In 1504, during the War of the Succession of Landshut, Berlichingen and his mercenary army fought for Albert IV, Duke of Bavaria. During the siege of the city of Landshut, he lost his right arm at the wrist when cannon fire forced his sword against him. In the following years, he had two mechanical prosthetic iron replacements made. The first iron hand was a more simple device, claimed to have been made by a local blacksmith and a saddle maker. The second, more famous prosthetic hand was capable of holding objects from a shield or reins to a quill. Both are on display today at the Burg Jagsthausen. In spite of this injury, Berlichingen continued his military activities. In the subsequent years he was involved in numerous feuds, both of his own and in support of friends and employers.

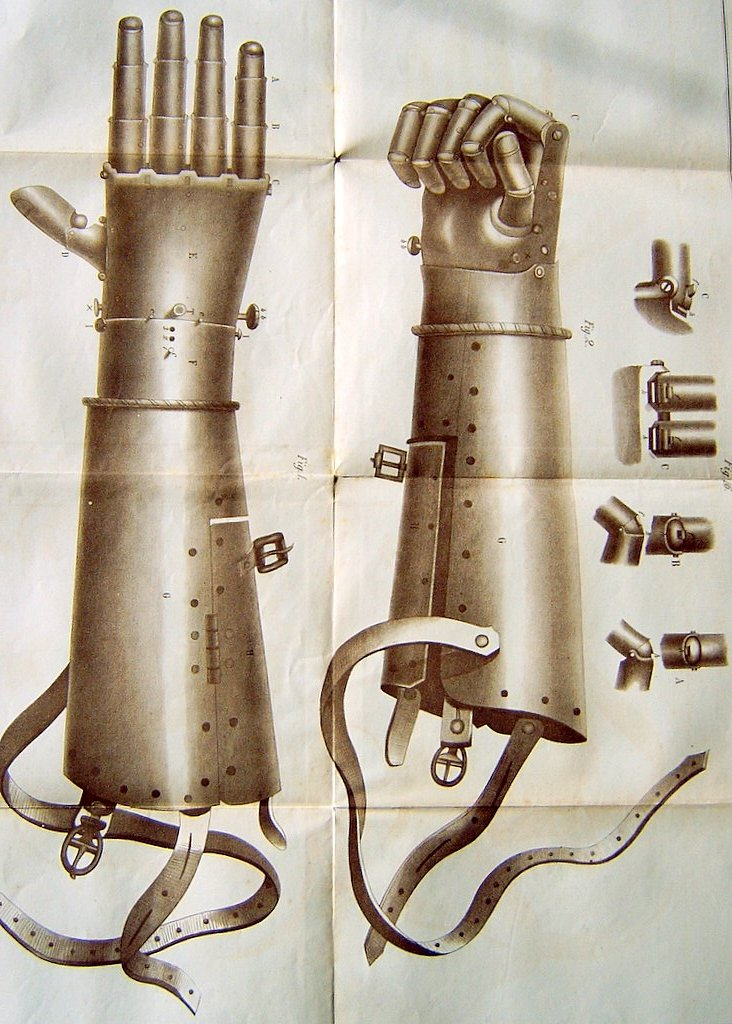
Diagram of the second iron prosthetic hand, which featured leather straps and jointed fingers that Berlichingen could set to grip weapons.

In 1512, near the town of Forchheim, due to a long running and bitter feud with Nuremberg he raided a group of Nuremberg merchants returning from the great fair at Leipzig. On hearing this, Emperor Maximilian placed Berlichingen under an Imperial ban. He was only released from this in 1514, when he paid the large sum of 14,000 gulden. In 1516, in a feud with the Principality of Mainz and its Prince-Archbishop, Berlichingen and his company mounted a raid into Hesse, capturing Philip II, Count of Waldeck, in the process. A ransom of 8,400 gulden was paid for the safe return of the Count. For this action, he was again placed under an Imperial ban in 1518.

In 1519, he signed up in the service of Ulrich, Duke of Württemberg, who was at war with the Swabian League. He fought in the defence of Möckmühl, but eventually was forced to surrender the town, owing to a lack of supplies and ammunition. In violation of the terms of surrender, he was held prisoner and handed over to the citizens of Heilbronn, a town he had raided several times. His fellow knights Georg von Frundsberg and Franz von Sickingen successfully argued for his release in 1522, but only after he paid a ransom of 2,000 gulden and swore not to take vengeance on the League.

In 1525, with the outbreak of the German Peasants' War, Berlichingen led the rebel army in the district of Odenwald against the Ecclesiastical Princes of the Holy Roman Empire. Despite this, he was (according to his own account) not a fervent supporter of their cause. He agreed to lead the rebels partly because he had no other option, and partly in an effort to curb the excesses of the rebellion. Despite his wishes to stop wanton violence, Berlichingen found himself powerless to control the rebels and after a month of nominal leadership he deserted his command and returned to the Burg Jagsthausen to sit out the rest of the rebellion in his castle.

After the Imperial victory, he was called before the Diet of Speyer to account for his actions. On 17 October 1526, he was acquitted by the Imperial chamber. Despite this, in November 1528 he was lured to Augsburg by the Swabian League, who were eager to settle old scores. After reaching Augsburg under promise of safe passage, and while preparing to clear himself of the old charges against him made by the league, he was seized and made prisoner until 1530 when he was liberated, but only after repeating his oath of 1522 and agreeing to return to his Burg Hornberg and remain in that area.

Berlichingen agreed to this and remained near the Hornberg until Emperor Charles V released him from his oath in 1540. He later served under Charles in the Kingdom of Hungary during the 1542 campaign against the Ottoman Empire of Suleiman the Magnificent. In 1544, he also participated in the Imperial invasion of France against Francis I of France. After the French campaign, Berlichingen returned to the Hornberg and lived out the rest of his life in relative peace. He died on 23 July 1562 in Hornberg Castle at the age of 81 or 82. Berlichingen married twice and left three daughters and seven sons to carry on his family name.

== Legacy ==
Berlichingen left an autobiography in manuscript form (Rossacher Handschrift). The text was published in 1731 as Lebens-Beschreibung des Herrn Gözens von Berlichingen ("Biography of Sir Götz von Berlichingen"), and republished in 1843 as Ritterliche Thaten Götz von Berlichingen's mit der eisernen Hand ("Knightly Deeds of Götz von Berlichingen with the Iron Hand") (ed. M. A. Gessert). A scholarly edition of the manuscript text was published in 1981 by Helgard Ulmschneider as Mein Fehd und Handlungen ("My Feuds and Actions").

When invited to surrender by the Swabian League, Götz reportedly said of the Swabian general: "He can lick my ass!" This anecdote helped popularise the phrase, which came to be called the Swabian salute in his honour.

Johann Wolfgang von Goethe in 1773 published the play Götz von Berlichingen based on the 1731 edition of the autobiography. The play, which catapulted Berlichingen as a prominent figure of German nationalism, depicted him as an upright man facing new and smothering political changes in the feudal German society. Other plays about Götz's life are The Devil and the Good Lord by Jean-Paul Sartre and Ironhand by John Arden. English composer Havergal Brian was inspired by Goethe's play when composing his Symphony No. 2 in E minor, initially creating an almost programmatic depiction of the character as portrayed in the play. The French composer Paul Dukas also wrote a Götz von Berlichingen concert overture for orchestra in 1883 while a student at the Conservatoire de Paris.

In addition, though technically unofficial, Hitler did propose naming one of the H-class battleships after Götz von Berlichingen, prior to their cancellation. The Panzer-Grenadier-Division "Götz von Berlichingen", later designated the 17th SS Panzergrenadier Division "Götz von Berlichingen" was named after him.

== Sources ==
- Goethe, Johann Wolfgang von – Götz von Berlichingen (1773).
- R. Pallmann – Der historische Götz von Berlichingen (Berlin, 1894).
- F. W. G. Graf von Berlichingen-Rossach – Geschichte des Ritters Götz von Berlichingen und seiner Familie (Leipzig, 1861).
- Lebens-Beschreibung des Herrn Gözens von Berlichingen – Götz's Autobiography, published Nürnberg 1731 (reprint Halle 1886).
