= Wenzel Trnka =

Wenzel Trnka von Krzowitz (Czech: Václav Trnka z Křovic; (16 October 1739 – 12 May 1791)) was an Austrian-Czech medical doctor, professor, and amateur composer. He is thought to have composed the canons Bei der Hitz im Sommer eß ich (English: In the heat of summer I eat) and Leck mir den Arsch fein recht schön sauber (English: Lick my arse right well and clean), which were previously attributed to Wolfgang Amadeus Mozart.

== Life ==
He was born 16 October 1739 in Tábor in Bohemia. In 1769, during his medical studies, the famous medical doctor Gerard van Swieten named him to serve as his assistant in the military hospital (Militärkrankenhaus). He received his doctorate 19 February 1770 with a treatise entitled "De morbo coxario"; ("On disease of the hip"). In June of the same year he was appointed to a professorial chair in anatomy at the University of Nagyszombat. Trnka thus became one of five who first formed the medical faculty there. He continued his service when the university was moved, first to Buda in 1777 and later to Pest, in 1784. He switched academic chairs twice, becoming the professor of general pathology in 1781 and of special pathology in 1786.

19th-century sources describe Trnka's medical career as a distinguished one; for instance Baas (1876) lists him among the eminent medical doctors of the "older Vienna School". He was a prolific author.

Trnka composed music, but apparently composition was only a hobby for him, and he was not judged sufficiently important as a composer to merit an article in the Grove Dictionary of Music and Musicians. According to Link, Trnka was a friend of the famous musical patron and organizer Gottfried van Swieten, son of Gerhard.

He died in Pest on 12 May 1791.

== The Mozart misattribution ==
Trnka emerged into public view in 1988 when it was revealed by Wolfgang Plath that he was the composer of two minor works previously attributed to Wolfgang Amadeus Mozart. Trnka's compositional specialization appears to have been canons, a form of music at the time often sung recreationally among friends. According to Link, at least 61 canons by Trnka survive, and all but one are to lyrics by the famous librettist Metastasio. Mozart enjoyed singing canons with his friends (see "Difficile lectu"), and particularly liked canons with humorous scatological lyrics, of which he composed several himself (see Mozart and scatology). In the present case, Mozart evidently took two canons by Trnka and gave them new lyrics, which he probably wrote himself. Trnka's "Tu sei gelosa, è vero" became Mozart's "Leck mir den Arsch fein recht schön sauber" ("Lick me in the ass right well and clean"), and Trnka's "So che vanti un cor ingrato" became Mozart's "Bei der Hitz im Sommer eß ich" ("In the heat of summer I eat"). These works were mistaken as Mozart's compositions when his widow Constanze sent them as part of a bundle of canons in 1800 to the publisher Breitkopf & Härtel, who four years later duly published them as Mozart's work. They entered the standard Köchel catalogue as K. 233 and K. 234 (K^{6} 382e).

The Dutch musicologist Albert Dunning anticipated Plath's findings: in his prefatory remarks to the 1974 Neue Mozart-Ausgabe edition of the canons he suggested (based on stylistic grounds and the lack of primary sources) that the two canons (and one other) were not by Mozart.

== Works (partial) ==
- (1775) Historia febrium intermittentium, omnis aevi observata et inventa illustriora medica ad has febres pertinentia complectens [on malaria]. Vienna: Ehelen.
- (1777) Commentarius de Tetans. Vienna. [on tetanus]
- (1778) De diabete commentarius. Vienna: Aug. Bernardi. [on diabetes]
- (1781) Historia Leucorrhoeae omnis aevi Observata Medica Continens.. [on leukorrhea]
- (1781) Geschichte der Wechselfieber oder Sammlung der vornehmsten medicinischen Beobachtungen und Erfindungen zur Erläuterung und Cur der Wechselfieber. Helmstädt: Kühnlin. [German translation of Historia febrium intermittentium]
- (1783) Historia ophthalmiæ: omnis ævi observata medica continens. Vienna: Rud. Græfferum.
- (1785) Historia cardialgiae. Vienna: I. D. Horlingianus.
- (1787) Historia rachitidis. Vienna: R. Graefferum. [on rickets]
- (1788) Historia tymphanitidis omnis aevi observata medica continens. Vienna: Joan. Dav. Hörling. [on flatulence]
- (1789) Geschichte der englischen Krankheit. Leipzig: Böhme. Translation of Historia rachitidis.
- (1794–1795) Historia haemorrhoidum omnis aevi observata medica continens. ("The history of hemorrhoids, containing the medical observations of all ages on that subject")
