= Götz von Berlichingen (Goethe) =

1773 play by Goethe

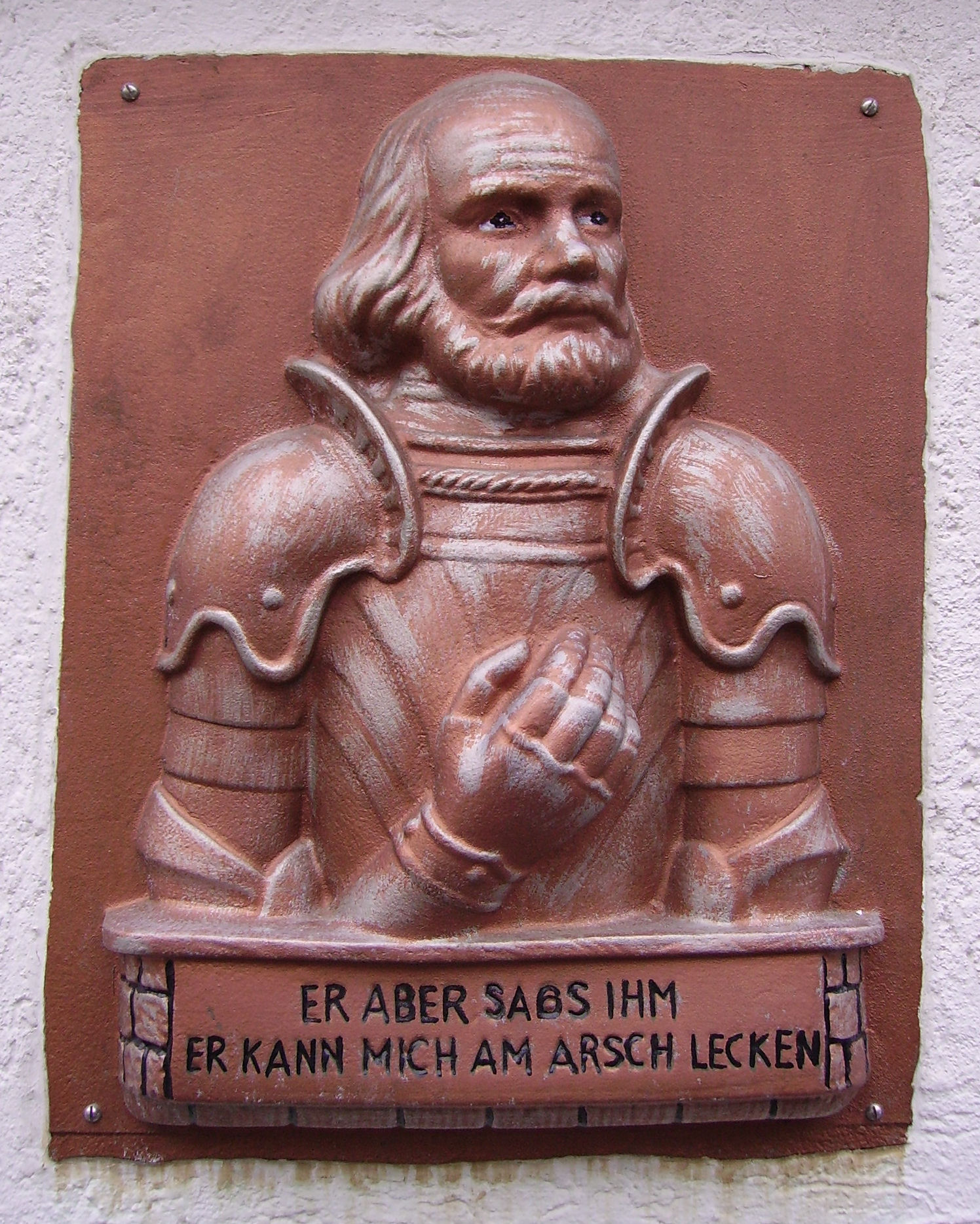
Representation of Götz with his famous quote: "But he, tell him, he can lick my arse" from Goethe's play (plaque in Weisenheim am Sand)

Götz von Berlichingen is a successful 1773 drama by Johann Wolfgang von Goethe, based on the memoirs of the historical adventurer-poet Gottfried or Götz von Berlichingen (c. 1480–1562). It first appeared in English in 1799 as Goetz of Berlichingen of the Iron Hand in a rather free version by Walter Scott.

Goethe's plot treats events freely: while the historical Götz died in his eighties, Goethe's hero is a free spirit, a maverick, intended to be a pillar of national integrity against a deceitful and over-refined society, and the way in which he tragically succumbs to the abstract concepts of law and justice shows the submission of the individual in that society.

Götz von Berlichingen was one of Goethe's early successes, but its large cast size, frequent quick scene changes, and long running time caused the original version to eventually fall out of favour. The play has been re-arranged and cut many times, including two versions by Goethe that were published posthumously. A 1925 silent film Goetz von Berlichingen of the Iron Hand was directed by Hubert Moest, while a 1955 Austrian production Goetz von Berlichingen starred Ewald Balser in the title role. In 1979 Wolfgang Liebeneiner directed Raimund Harmstorf in a film version, Goetz von Berlichingen of the Iron Hand.

== Famous quote ==
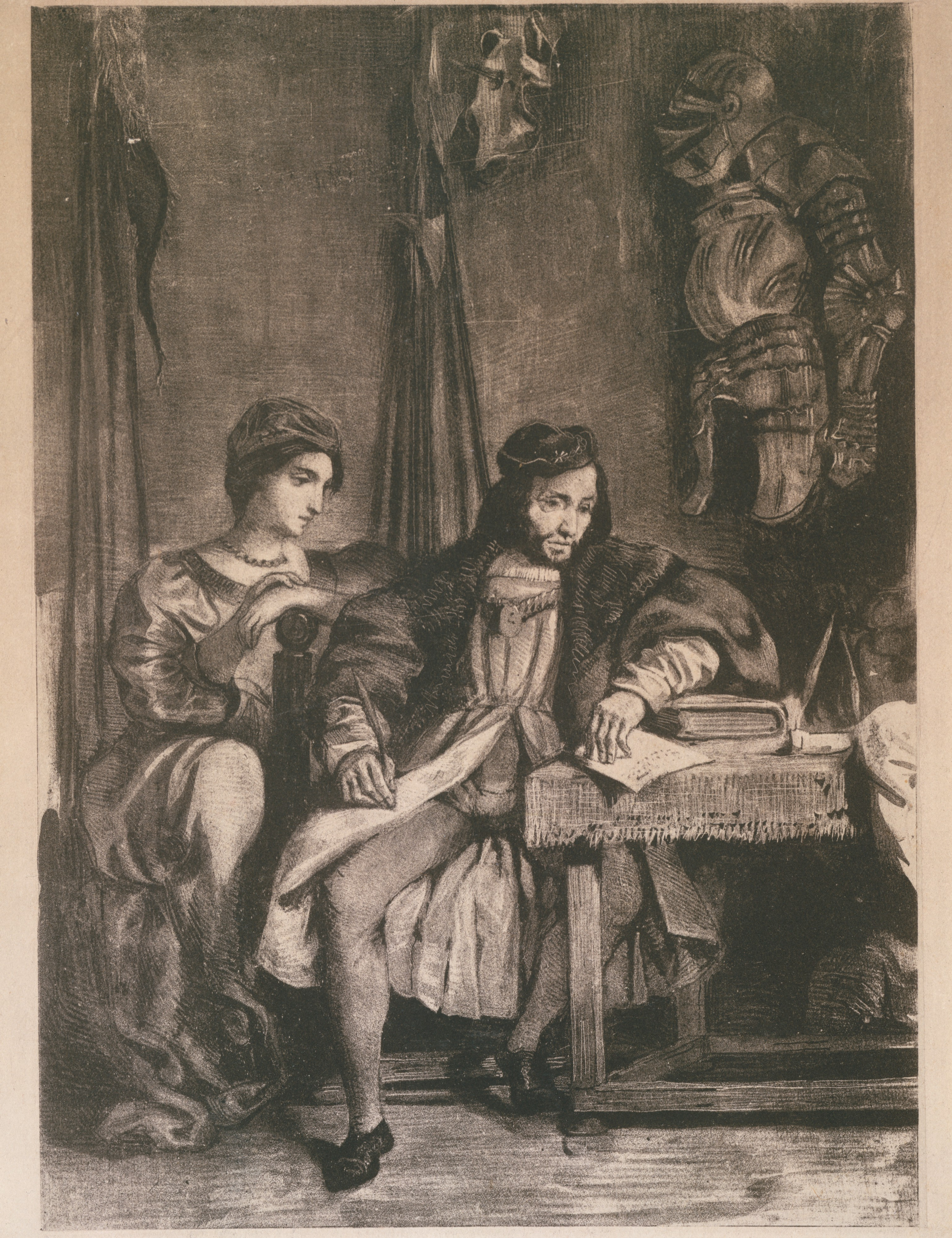
Scene from Goethe's 'Götz' (Götz von Berlichingen Writing his Memoirs. 1836–63, by Eugène Delacroix, The Metropolitan Museum of Art

The first version of the drama included a quote that gained fame fast. In the third act, Götz is under siege by the Imperial Army in his castle at Jagsthausen. The captain of the army asked him to surrender; from a window, he gives his answer:

Mich ergeben! Auf Gnad und Ungnad! Mit wem redet Ihr! Bin ich ein Räuber! Sag deinem Hauptmann: Vor Ihro Kaiserliche Majestät hab ich, wie immer, schuldigen Respekt. Er aber, sag's ihm, er kann mich im Arsch lecken!

— Johann Wolfgang von Goethe, Götz von Berlichingen mit der eisernen Hand, act 3, Goethe's Werke, vol. 8 (1889), p. 109

It can be translated as:

Me, surrender! At mercy! With whom do you speak? Am I a robber! Tell your captain that for His Imperial Majesty, I have, as always, due respect. But he, tell him that, he can lick me in the arse!

Goethe based this passage on the autobiography of the historical Götz, who records himself as saying (in a different context) "er solte mich hinden lecken" ("He can lick me on the behind"). (In reality, the besieger was Götz himself.)

The "he can lick me in the arse" quote became known euphemistically as the Swabian salute or the Götz quote. Only the editions of 1773 and 1774 had the full quote. After that, it was long common practice in printed editions to truncate the quote to "er kann mich — — — ".
