= Leck mich im Arsch =

1782 canon in 6 voices by W. A. Mozart

- Canon by W. A. Mozart
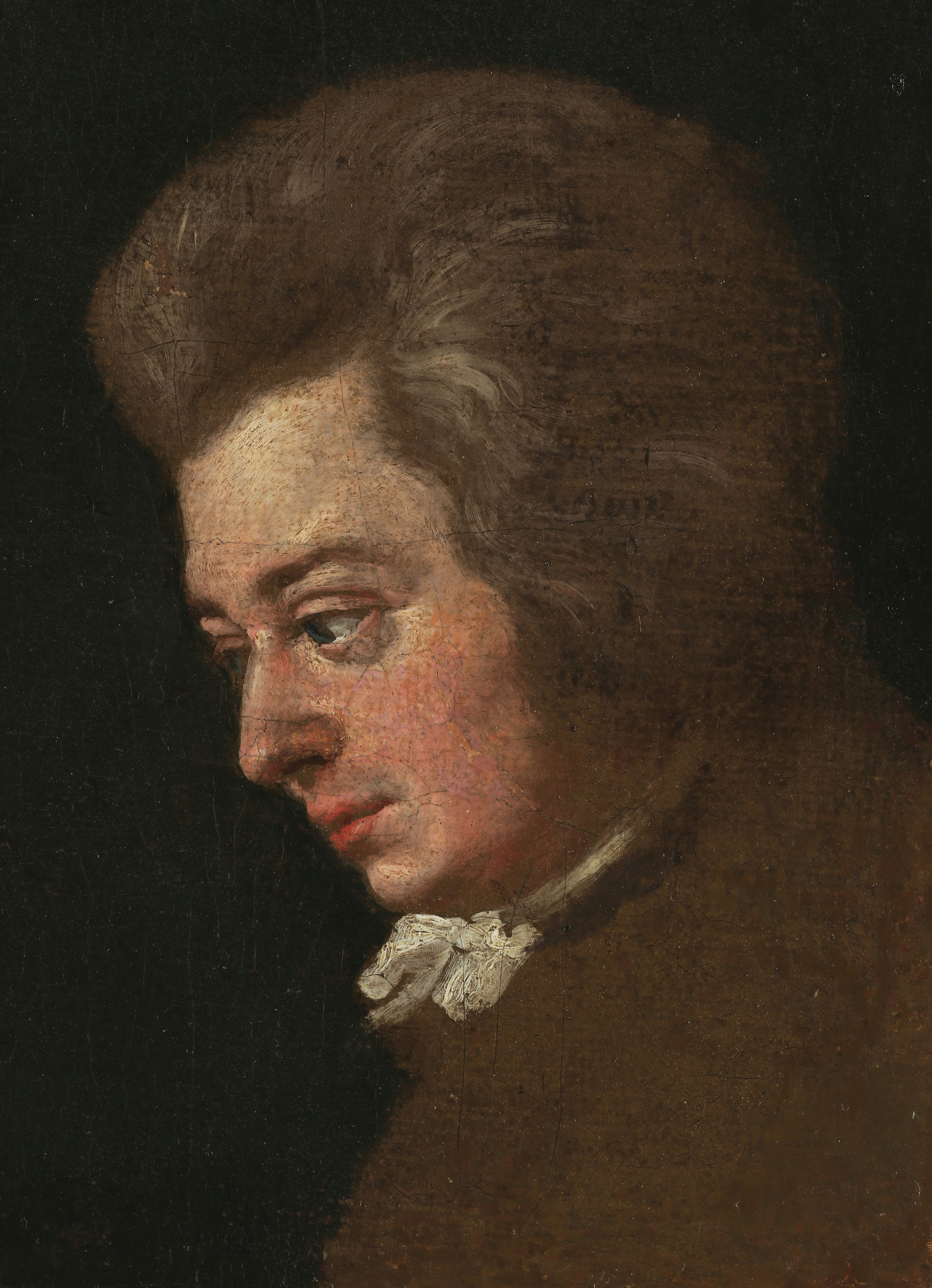
- Detail of Joseph Lange's 1782–83 Mozart portrait
- English: Lick me in the arse
- Other name: Laßt froh uns sein [Let us be glad]
- Key: B♭ major
- Catalogue: K. 231/382c
- Text: probably Mozart himself
- Language: German
- Composed: 1782, Vienna
- Published: 1799, Leipzig
- Publisher: Breitkopf & Härtel
- Scoring: 6 voices

"Leck mich im Arsch" (German for "Lick me in the arse") is a canon in B♭ major composed by Wolfgang Amadeus Mozart, K. 231 (K. 382c), with lyrics in German. It was one of a set of at least six canons probably written in Vienna in 1782. Sung by six voices, it is thought to be a party piece for his friends.

== English translation ==
The German idiom used as the title of the work is equivalent to the British English "Kiss my arse!" or American English "Kiss my ass!"

== Publication and modern discovery ==
After Mozart's death in 1791, his widow, Constanze, sent the manuscripts of the canons to publishers Breitkopf & Härtel in 1799 for publication. The publisher changed the vulgar title and lyrics of this canon to the more decorous "Laßt froh uns sein" ("Let us be glad!"). Of Mozart's original text, only the first words were documented in the catalogue of his works produced by Breitkopf & Härtel.

A score containing what may possibly be the original text was discovered in 1991. Handwritten texts to this and several other similar canons were found added to a printed score of the work in a historical printed edition acquired by Harvard University's Music Library. They had evidently been added to the book sometime after publication. However, since in six of the pieces these entries matched texts that had, in the meantime, independently come to light in original manuscripts, it was hypothesised that the remaining three may, too, have been original, including texts for K. 231 ("Leck mich im Arsch" itself), and another Mozart work, "Leck mir den Arsch fein recht schön sauber" ("Lick my arse nice and clean", K. 233; K. 382d in the revised numbering). Later research revealed that the latter work was likely composed by Wenzel Trnka.

== Lyrics ==
The text rediscovered in 1991 consists only of the repeated phrases and words: Leck mich im A... g'schwindi, g'schwindi! where "A..." obviously stands for Arsch; g'schwindi is a dialect word corresponding to standard German geschwind, meaning 'quickly'.

"Leck mich im Arsch"
MIDI file, 2:16

The bowdlerised text of the early printed editions reads:

Laßt uns froh sein!
Murren ist vergebens!
Knurren, Brummen ist vergebens,
ist das wahre Kreuz des Lebens,
das Brummen ist vergebens,
Knurren, Brummen ist vergebens, vergebens!
Drum laßt uns froh und fröhlich, froh sein!

Let us be glad!
Grumbling is in vain!
Growling, droning is in vain,
is the true bane of life,
Droning is in vain,
Growling, droning is in vain, in vain!
Thus let us be cheerful and merry, be glad!

Another semi-bowdlerized adaptation is found in the recordings of The Complete Mozart edition by Brilliant Classics:

Leck mich im Arsch!
Goethe, Goethe!
Götz von Berlichingen! Zweiter Akt;
Die Szene kennt ihr ja!
Rufen wir nur ganz summarisch:
Hier wird Mozart literarisch!

Kiss my arse!
Goethe, Goethe!
Götz von Berlichingen! Second act;
You know the scene too well!
Let us now shout the summary:
Mozart here gets literary!

This is a clear allusion to the line ... er kann mich im Arsche lecken! (literally, "he can lick me in the arse" or idiomatically "he can kiss my arse") attributed to the late medieval German knight Götz von Berlichingen, known best as the title hero of the 1773 play by Johann Wolfgang von Goethe. The text of the canon contains a slight error about the Goethe source: the line occurs in scene 3 the third act.

== See also ==
- "Difficile lectu" – a canon with a disguised Latin version of the same text, meant to fool Peierl before the singing of "O du eselhafter Peierl"
- "Bona nox" – "Good night", a multilingual scatological canon
- Mozart and scatology
