= Leck mir den Arsch fein recht schön sauber =

Canon attributed to Mozart

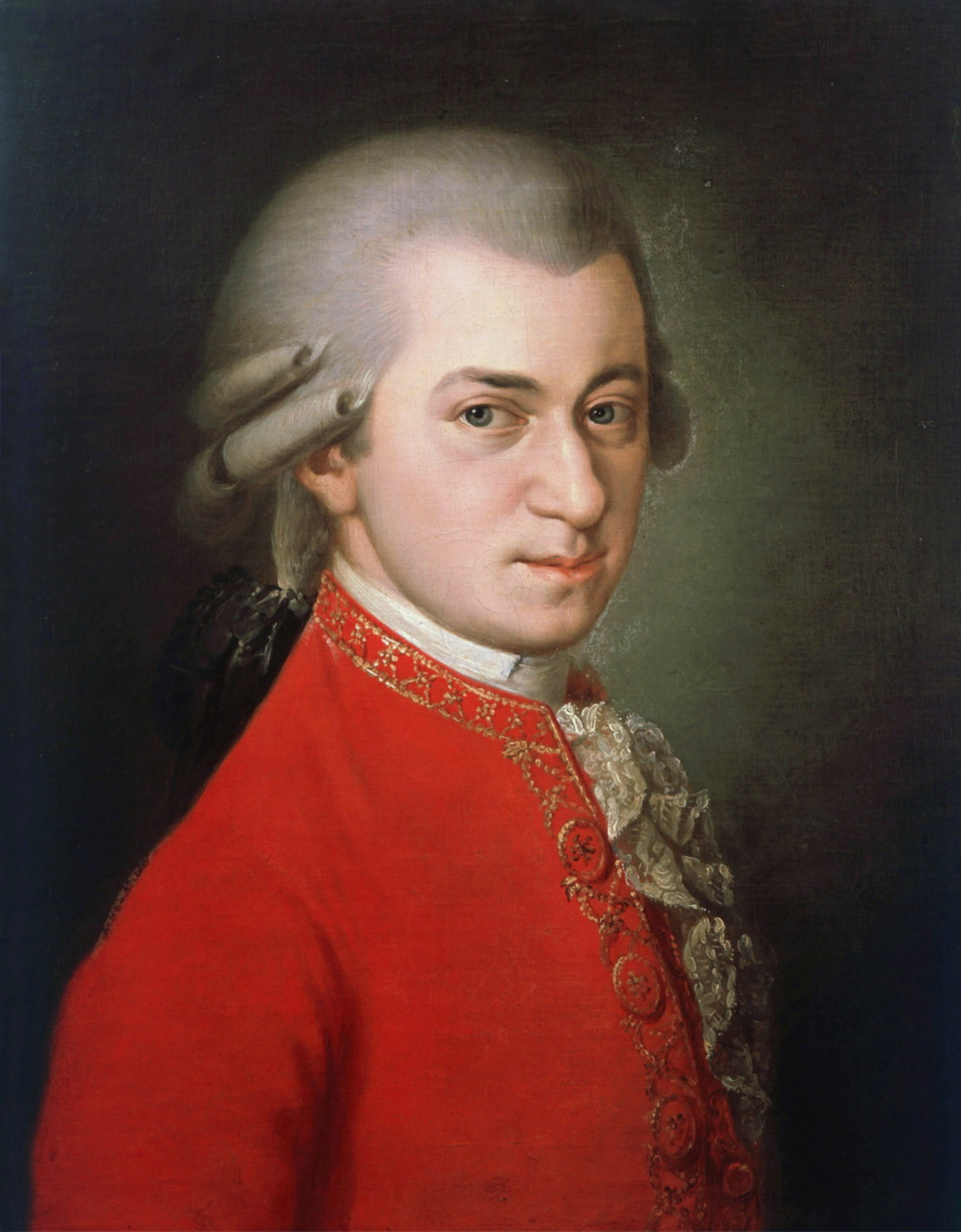
Wolfgang Amadeus Mozart, posthumous painting by Barbara Krafft (1819)

"Leck mir den Arsch fein recht schön sauber" ("Lick my arse right well and clean") is a canon for three voices in B-flat major, K. 233/382d/Anh.A 39. The lyrics appear to stem from Mozart. The music was long thought to have been composed by Wolfgang Amadeus Mozart during 1782 in Vienna, but now thought to be the work of Wenzel Trnka.

== Authenticity ==
In 1988, Wolfgang Plath presented evidence that the composer of this piece, as well as "Bei der Hitz im Sommer eß ich", K. 234/382e/Anh.A 40, was in fact Wenzel Trnka (1739–1791). That Mozart might not be the author of "Sie ist dahin", K. 229, "Selig, selig", K. 230, "Leck mich im Arsch", K. 231, this work, K. 233, and "Bei der Hitz im Sommer eß ich", was already mentioned in the Bärenreiter Neue Mozart-Ausgabe (NMA) in 1974. The Trnka canon's original lyrics were "Tu sei gelosa, è vero", but Mozart set the canon to his own scatological lyrics. Mozart's widow Constanze Mozart submitted the modified canon to publisher Breitkopf & Härtel.

== Lyrics ==
The rediscovered, probably original, text reads:

Leck mire den A... recht schon,
fein sauber lecke ihn,
fein sauber lecke, leck mire den A…
Das ist ein fettigs Begehren,
nur gut mit Butter geschmiert,
den das Lecken der Braten mein tagliches Thun.
Drei lecken mehr als Zweie,
nur her, machet die Prob'
und leckt, leckt, leckt.
Jeder leckt sein A… fur sich.

Lick my arse nicely,
lick it nice and clean,
nice and clean, lick my arse.
That's a greasy desire,
nicely buttered,
like the licking of roast meat, my daily activity.
Three will lick more than two,
come on, just try it,
and lick, lick, lick.
Everybody lick their arse for themselves.

=== Alternative lyrics ===
Shown in Bärenreiter's Neue Mozart Edition is the text as changed either by Johann Christoph Härtel (1763–1827) or by Christoph Gottlob Breitkopf (1750–1800) for the 1804 edition of the canons in Œvres Complettes by Breitkopf & Härtel.

Nichts labt mich mehr als Wein;
er schleicht so sacht hinein,
er schleicht so sacht, er schleicht sacht hinein!
Er netzt, wenn alles gleich lechzet,
die trockenen Kehlen allein;
läßt wenn Murrkopf auch ächzet,
stets fröhlich mich sein.
Drum schwingt mit mir die Gläser! Stoßt an!
Laßt alle Sorgen sein! Stoßt an!
Wir ersäufen sie im Wein!

Nothing refreshes me more than wine;
It sneaks so gently in,
It sneaks so gently, it sneaks so gently in!
It wets, when everything yearns,
The dry throats alone;
Even when I grumpily groan
It always cheers me up.
So let's raise the glasses! Let's toast!
Let all sorrows be! Let's toast!
We'll drown them in wine!

In Brilliant Classics' Mozart Complete Edition a different adaptation is used:

Leck mir den Arsch fein rein.
Soll das denn Urtext sein?
Soll das denn Mozarts Urtext sein?!
Leck mir?! O nein, o nein!
Dies Bildnis ist so rein,
ist so weiss wie ein Schwan!
Leck mir? Das kann nicht sein, nein!
O nein!
Soll das denn wirklich Urtext sein?
Nein, der Mozart war ein feiner Mann!

Lick me in the arse fine and clean.
Should that be the Urtext?
Should that then be Mozart's Urtext?!
Lick me?! Oh no, oh no!
This image is so pure,
Is as white as a swan!
Lick me? That cannot be, no!
Oh no!
Should that then really be the Urtext?
No, that Mozart was a decent man!

== See also ==
- "Leck mich im Arsch", K. 231
- "Difficile lectu mihi mars", K. 559
- "Bona nox", K. 561
- Mozart and scatology
- Wenzel Trnka § The Mozart misattribution, for more on the canon's misattribution to Mozart
