= Wolfgang Plath =

German musicologist

Wolfgang Plath (27 December 1930 – 19 March 1995) was a German musicologist specialising in research on Wolfgang Amadeus Mozart.

== Life ==
Born in Riga, Plath studied musicology under Walter Gerstenberg, first at the Free University of Berlin, then at University of Tübingen. His PhD thesis in 1958 dealt with the Klavierbüchlein für Wilhelm Friedemann Bach.

In 1959, he became the assistant of Ernst Fritz Schmid in Augsburg and the International Mozarteum Foundation appointed him, together with Wolfgang Rehm, editor of the Neue Mozart-Ausgabe; Plath held this position until his death. He also worked as honorary professor at the universities of Augsburg and Salzburg.

In 1977, he received the Austrian Decoration for Science and Art, 1st Class.

On the occasion of Plath's 60th birthday, Marianne Danckwardt edited a selection of his writings, along with a bibliography.

He died in Augsburg, aged 64.
