= Boßler family =

Hessian family of the tribe Ruede

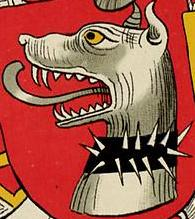
Coat of arms (Stammwappen) of the aristocratic family Rüde von Bödigheim and its collateral lines to which the Boßler named branch belongs

Boßler German: [ˈbɔslɐ], also spelled Bossler or Bosler in some family branches or testimonies of earlier centuries, is the changed name of a patrilineal lateral branch of the patrician family Rüde German: [ˈʁyːdə] based in the electoral palatinate chief administrative city Mosbach. Again, the Mosbach line, and thus its Boßler named branch, originates lawfully from the aristocratic House of the Rüden von Bödigheim (Uradel).

Crafts and trade were reserved for the burghers and forbidden to the German nobility. In order to establish themselves successfully in these trades the Mosbach Rüden deliberately obscure off their old nobility. Its branch the southern Hessian family was particularly notable in the manufacture of air guns, in the field of music journalism and music engraving and in German inland passenger and freight shipping on the rivers Neckar and Rhine. In addition, individual members of the family achieved importance in scientific or cultural terms over the course of time.

The unbroken line of the family dynasty, which settled in 1738 with a branch in colonial British Pennsylvania and has had another branch in France since 1791, has been documented in the area of the historic district of Lichtenberg (district Darmstadt-Dieburg) since 1616. Members of the dynasty appeared there as local lower and higher judicial court officials, as princely state officials in the forestry and cameral system of the Landgraviate of Hesse-Darmstadt and as burgraves belonging to the hesse court officials. Due to their social standing, they belonged to the regional notables.

== History ==
=== The Origin of the Family ===
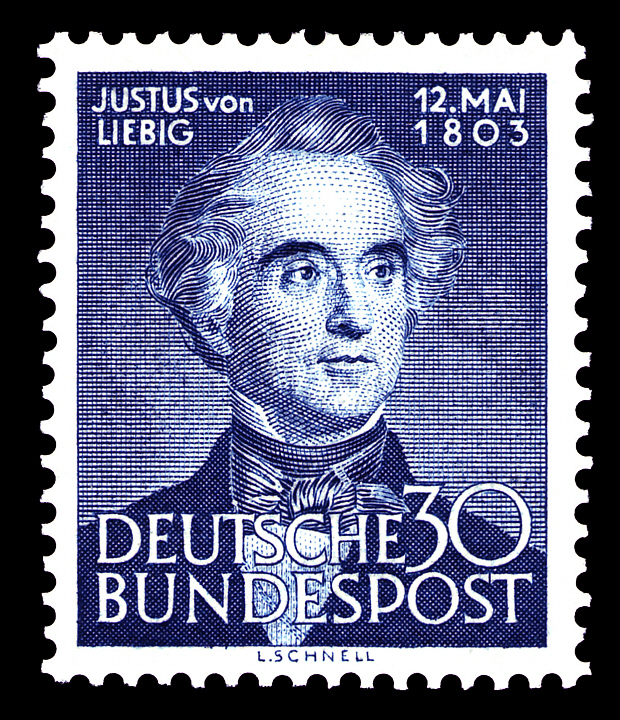
Johann Jacob Liebig (1752–1809) was married to a Boßler and was an uncle of the eminent scientist Justus von Liebig

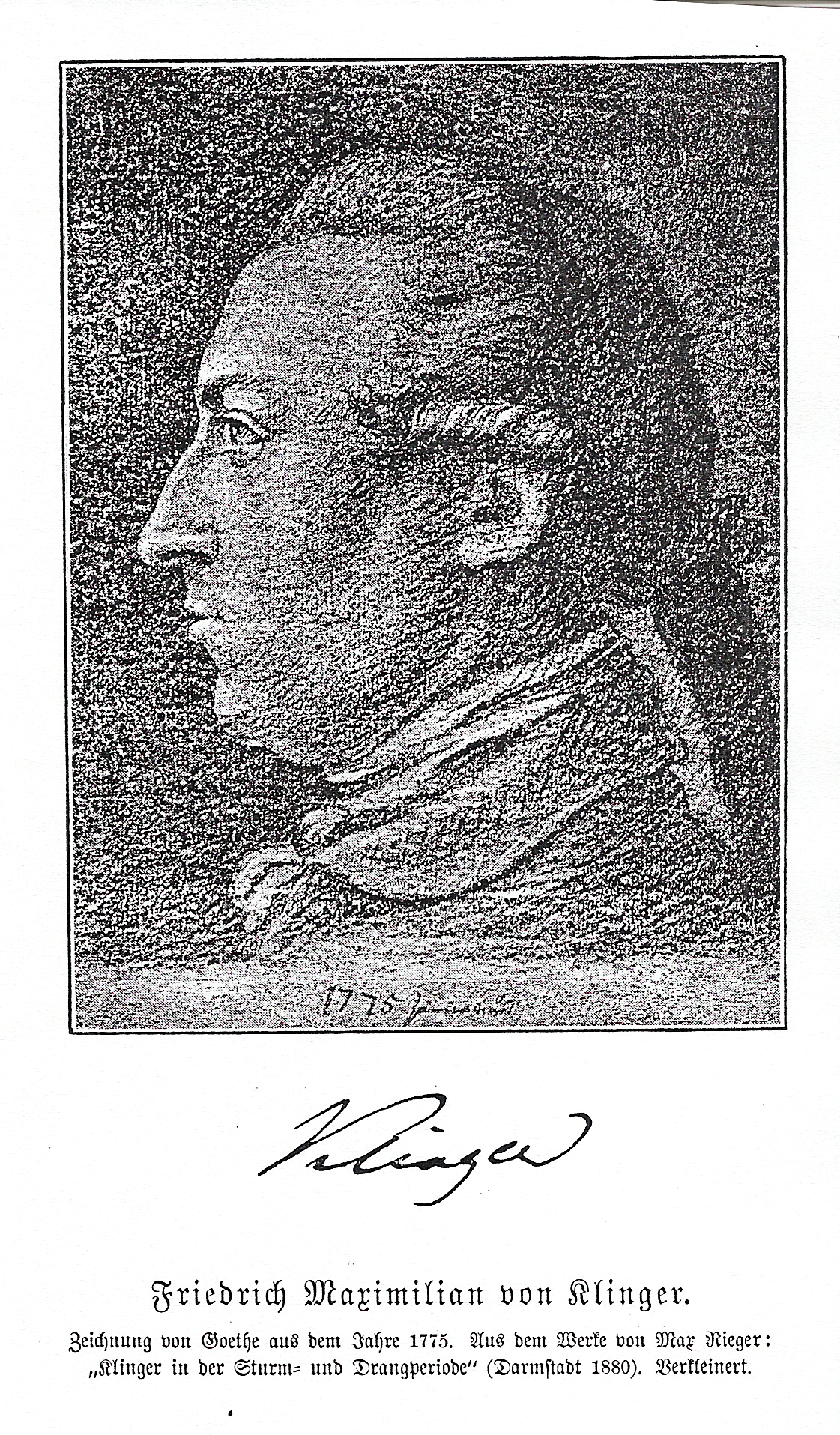
F. M. Klinger belonged to the family through his grandmother Anna Barbara Boßler (1674–1747)

Rüde is a nomen gentilicium, which was changed for business reasons and to conceal family relationships to the dialectal occupational surname Boßler at the request of the bearer of the name between 1633 and 1640. The Boßler family represent a lawful patrilineal branch of the patricians Rüde, who had lived in Mosbach since 1482.

The Rüden, who ranked among the wealthiest burghers of the chief administrative city, practised crafts and trade. As councillors and mayors, the patrician family was involved in the local government and was one of Mosbach's lenders. The Rüde family of Mosbach also became part of the patriciate of the imperial city of Heilbronn and were related to the Heilbronn patriciate as well as the patriciate of the imperial city of Hall and families ennobled by imperial letters patent.

Rüde is a nomen gentilicium, which was changed to the dialectal occupational surname Boßler at the request of the bearer of the name between 1633 and 1640. The Boßler family tree begins in 1616 in the Hessian Amt Lichtenberg. At Asbach, now a district of the municipality of Modautal the family survived the Thirty Years' War unharmed.

Martin Rüde dictus Boßler (1616–1694) is the progenitor of the family. He had four sons: Christian (1643–1690) burgrave and gunsmith, Matthaeus (1645–1716), Peter (1654–1697) and Johann Valentin (1661–1719). All four of them were born under the freely adopted surname Boßler, which had replaced the nomen gentilicium Rüde.

==== One of the first families of America ====
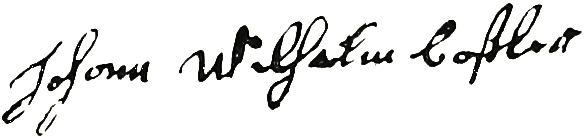
Signature of Johann Wilhelm Boßler on the occasion of the Oath of Allegiance taken on 28 October 1738

Johann Wilhelm (1714–1782) from Ernsthofen, the youngest son of Johann Valentin Boßler, was among the pioneer settlers of the Province of Pennsylvania. In 1767, William Bossler farmed his 150-acre plantation in Windsor Township. By 1779, William and his son John Heinrich (Henry) Bossler (1747–1790), also named Bassler, owned a combined 280 acres of plantations and no slaves.

The German inscription on the 1773 decorated Pennsylvania–Dutch chest belonging to Catharina Bossler (1750–1836) reflects her upbringing in a prosperous family of plantation owners. Alfred J. Bossler (1836–1895), through his grandfather Jacob (1784–1846) a great-grandson of the farmer Henry Bossler, “belongs to an old and respected ancestry, the American branch of which has always resided in the eastern part of the State”.

Among the veterans of the American Revolutionary War is William's son George Bossler (1749–1805) and one of his sons-in-law. George's son John Bassler (1780–1859) married Catharina (1789–1856), the eldest daughter of Captain John Conrad Weiser († 1803) and thus a great-grandchild of Conrad Weiser. Georges granddaughter Catharina Bossler (Bussler) (1815–1892) was the mother of Wilson Arbogast, co-founder of the Arbogast & Bastian slaughterhouse. Georges daughter-in-law Catharina Weiser was related to the Muhlenberg family.

William's youngest son Christian Bossler (1758–1808) married Elizabeth Rieser (Reeser) (*1760). Elizabeth Bossler was a cousin of Susanna Rieser (Reeser) (1761–1823), married Hiester, both through her maternal line (LeVan) and through her father's family. Christian Hiester (1756–1827), who with Susanna Rieser had a maternal and paternal cousin of Elizabeth Bossler as his wife, belonged to the third generation of the Hiester family and was therefore a cousin of Daniel, John and Gabriel Hiester. Elizabeth Bossler, née Rieser, had an aunt on her mother's side, Esther LeVan (1752–1798), whose first marriage was to diplomat Conrad Weiser's nephew Benjamin Weiser (1740–1782).

The influential families Muhlenberg and Hiester are political, religious and military dynasties of the United States. Samuel Keagy Royer (1816–1896), whose grandfather Samule Royer (1738–1823) served as a captain in the Revolutionary War, had married Elizabeth Bossler (1820–1889), a granddaughter of Christian Bossler. Elisabeth Bossler Royer's husband was a nephew of the Ironmasters and state legislators of Pennsylvania Daniel (1762–1838) and John Royer (1778–1850), father-in-law of Edward D. Hamilton and through his wife's family in relation to Edmund Alexander de Schweinitz.

== Coat of arms ==
As rightful male side line and thus a member of the agnatic legal community of the aristocratic House of the Rüde von Bödigheim, the Boßlers bear the same coat of arms, which shows a right-facing, white or silver head of a Rüde with a red tongue on a red shield. On the helmet with its red and silver mantle.

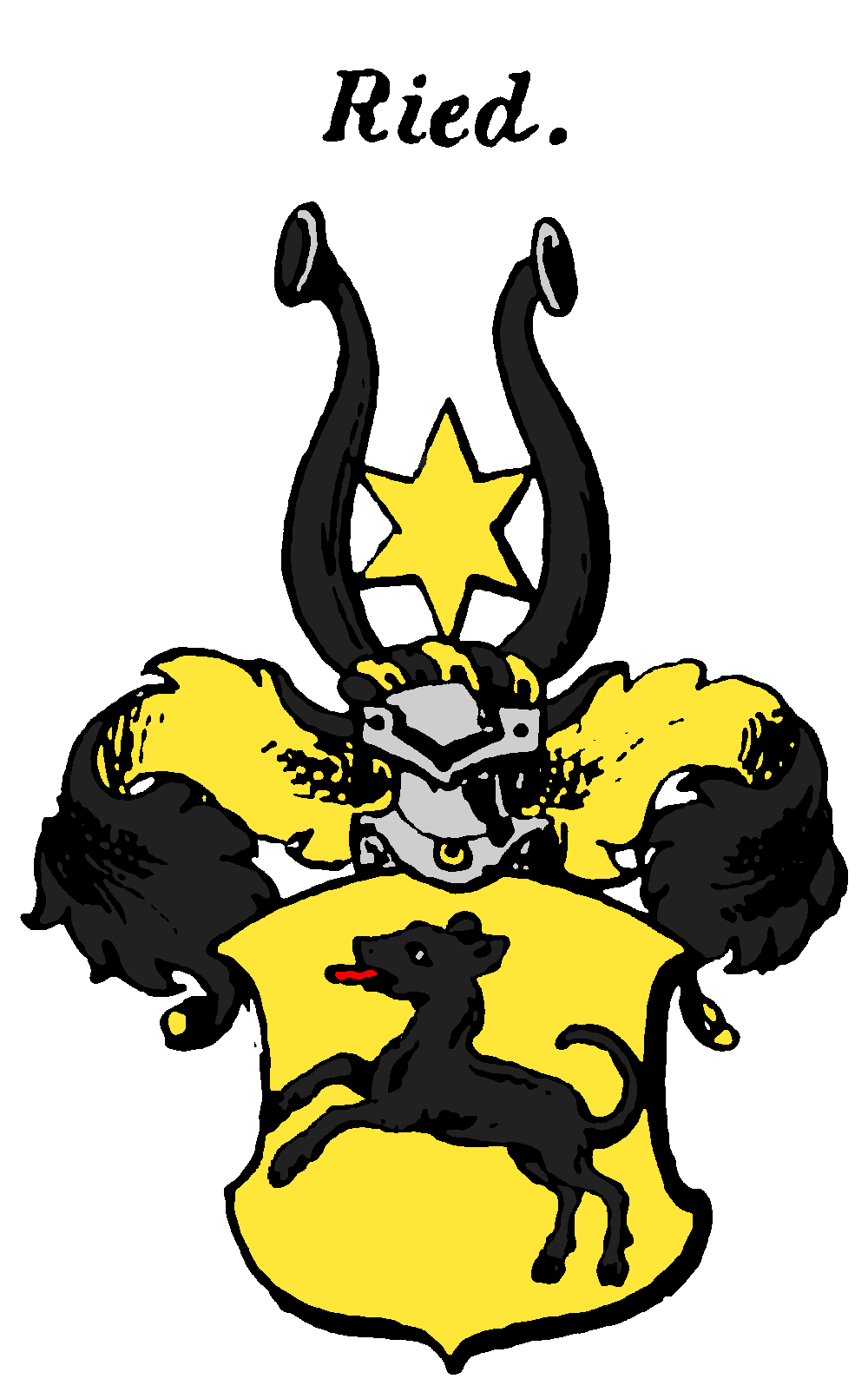
Burgher arms from 1607, obscuring the old nobility of the Rüden

Formal the Mosbach line changed its coat of arms to obscure its aristocratic ancestry to a black, smooth-haired Rüde pointing upwards towards the jump with open mouth, craving red tongue and tail curved over itself on a yellow or golden escutcheon with a frog-mouth helm.

To use aristocratic rights even as burghers in 1607, prince-elector Frederick IV of the Palatinate confirmed the above blazoned family coat of arms by grant of arms with feudal fief article and granted an augmentation of honour consisting of a tilting helmet with black mantling on the outside and a yellow or golden on the inside, from which two black horns emerge at the top and a yellow or golden six-pointed star between them.

Prince-elector Frederick V of the Palatinate increased the burgher arms Rüde again in 1619 by grant of arms with feudal fief article. An imperial or electoral issuance of arms with a feudal fief article is recognised as a patent of nobility by the Almanach de Gotha.

=== cultural and social significance ===
In the field of music and drama, the fine arts were shaped by two descendants of the South Hessian dynasty who were among the active participants in the cultural and musical life of their era. The first was the renowned music publisher Heinrich Philipp Boßler (1744–1812), a figure who shaped music publishing in the 18th century. On the other hand, there was Friedrich Maximilian Klinger, a childhood friend of Goethe and one of the most important poets in literary history, whose work Sturm und Drang gave its name to an entire literary epoch in the Age of Enlightenment.

Klinger found a connection to the Boßler family through his paternal grandmother's line. Both descend from the gunsmith Christian Boßler. The baltic knighthoods itself points out that Klinger was married to an illegitimate daughter of the Russian empress Catherine the Great.

Some branches of the Boßler family are related to notable figures in theology,science, politics, and culture, or have close familial connections to them. These include, for example, the outstanding chemist Justus Liebig or Georg Gottfried Gervinus (1805–1871) as well as Friedrich Ludwig Weidig. At this point, the social-genealogical reference to the internationally known Merck family of Darmstadt also seems remarkable. In addition, there are recurring genealogical links to families of forestry and hunting officials or members of the Lutheran clergy.

The Paris branch, i.e. the French part of the family descended from Matthäus Boßler. The most famous scientific representative was the astronomer Jean Bosler (1878–1973), whose work was shaped by his work as director at the Marseille Observatory. His scientific work was award-winning, even the Nobel Prize winner Erwin Schrödinger considered him for his work. Jean Boslers great-grandfather came from Reinheim and went to Paris. In France the surname Boßler was changed to the form Bosler.

In the natural sciences, the chemical element Darmstadtium, with atomic number 110 in the group 10 elements of the periodic table, is also associated with the name Bossler.

== Entrepreneurship ==
=== Court gunsmith of the landgraves of Darmstadt ===
Members of the dynasty and descendants of the gunsmith Christian Boßler made a name for themselves as hesse-darmstadt court gunsmiths. They created rifles that can still be found in public or private collections throughout Europe and have even found their way into the catalogues of Christie's, the global auction house. All in all, these family members have achieved a high social standing, are part of Hesse-Darmstadt's hunting history and they gained recognition for their skillful craftsmanship in the production of air rifles.

The air rifles of the hesse-darmstadt court gunsmiths Johann Peter (1689–1742) and Friedrich Jacob Boßler (1717–1793) so famous that they were copied during the lifetime of their creators.

House flag of the Bossler shipping companies

=== Inland shipping company in Neckarsteinach ===
The Neckarsteinach branch, ergo the entire family from Neckarsteinach, is divided into an older and a younger family line and belongs to the history of shipping on the Neckar. The older line was active in cargo shipping on the Rhine and its tributaries. The Boßlers in Neckarsteinach are also descended from Matthaeus Boßler through the schoolmaster and merchant Johannes Boßler (1796–1834) from Nieder-Modau (near Ober-Ramstadt).

The younger line concentrated on the business of passenger shipping (white shipping). It operated a passenger shipping company based in Bad Friedrichshall as well as two shipping companies in Neckarsteinach and Heidelberg. In the process, the family tradition of operating passenger transport on the Neckar since 1796 was advertised for tourist purposes. Members of the younger family line are considered pioneers of passenger shipping on the Neckar, as they were already active in this business field in the 1920s.

The guest list of the passenger companies run by the younger line included government officials, political figures, and foreign representatives Descendants of the shipping entrepreneur Andreas Boßler (1884–1961) are today shareholders in the passenger shipping company Weisse Flotte Heidelberg.

Thus a family branch of the younger line is involved in one of the largest tourism companies in the shipping industry in southern Germany.

Incidentally, the piano manufacturer Henry Ackerman (1845–1923) in Marion, Ohio (Ackerman & Lowe) belonged to the nephews of Johannes Boßler through his mother, Margaretta Ackerman(n) a née Bossler from Nieder-Modau.

== Bibliography in German language ==
- Marcel Christian Boßler: Die hessischen Büchsenmacher Boßler. Two Parts, in: Archiv für hessische Geschichte und Altertumskunde, Darmstadt 2022–2023, ISSN 0066-636X.
  - Part 1. Eine Waffenmanufaktur als Komponente der hessen-darmstädtischen Jagdhistorie und Diplomatie. (2022), p. 91–130.
  - Part 2. Drei Brüder, ein feurig-pulvriges Kunsthandwerk und die europäisch funkende Vetternschaft von Heinrich Philipp Boßler mit Friedrich Maximilian Klinger. (2023), p. 45–84.
- Marcel Christian Boßler: Er war nicht zu Zella geboren! Der Hessen-Darmstädtische Hofbüchsenmacher Johann Peter Boßler und seine Dynastie, in: Waffen- und Kostümkunde. Zeitschrift für Waffen- und Kleidungsgeschichte, Sonnefeld 2020, ISSN 0042-9945, p. 151–174.
- Beethoven-Haus Bonn: Die musikalische Welt des jungen Beethoven. Beethovens Verleger Heinrich Philipp Boßler, Bonn 2001.
- Helmut Betz: Historisches vom Strom. Die Neckarschiffahrt vom Treidelkahn zum Groß-Motorschiff, Vol. 5, Duisburg 1989, ISBN 3-924999-04-X, p. 53, 122, 128, 142–148.
- Hans Schneider: Der Musikverleger Heinrich Philipp Bossler 1744–1812. Mit bibliographischen Übersichten und einem Anhang Mariane Kirchgeßner und Boßler, Tutzing 1985, ISBN 3-7952-0500-X.
- Günter Benja: Personenschiffahrt in deutschen Gewässern. Vollständiges Verzeichnis aller Fahrgastschiffe und -dienste, mit 115 Schiffsfotos, Oldenburg 1975, ISBN 3-7979-1853-4, p. 34–35.
- Europa-Verkehr = European transport = Transports européens. Band 18, Otto Elsner, Darmstadt 1970, ISSN 0014-262X, p. 122–123.
