= Johann Peter Boßler =

German master gunsmith and hunting arms manufacturer (1689–1742)

Johann Peter Boßler [ˈbɔslɐ] also written Bossler and Bosler (born between 6 and 9 April 1689 in the liberty of castle Lichtenberg; died 31 July 1742 in Darmstadt) was a German master gunsmith and hunting arms manufacturer. He was in the service of the House of Hesse-Darmstadt and is considered an outstanding figure in the history of hunting in Hesse-Darmstadt.

Even before his son Friedrich Jacob, Johann Peter Boßler had been the most famous European specialist for air rifles. Even while he was still alive, his elegant and engineeringly outstanding air guns were imitated by other gunsmiths.

It is also known that Johann Peter Boßler made hybrid air-powder rifles that could be used with explosive material and with air rifle mechanisms.

== Family and early life ==
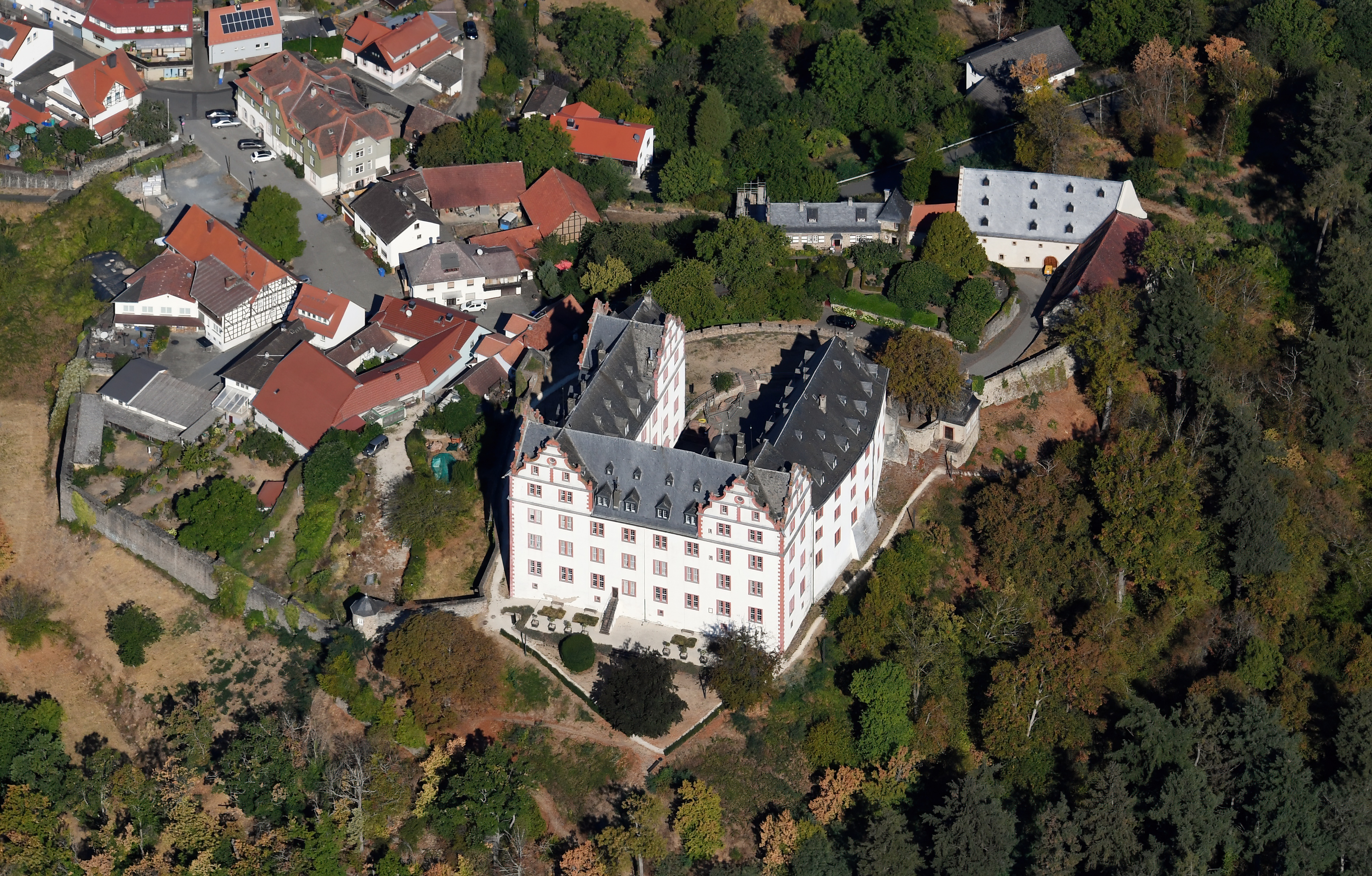
The liberty of castle Lichtenberg

Johann Peter Boßler is said to have learned the gunsmith's trade in Zella in Thuringia. He is also said to have been born there, which can be read in much of the older literature. A documentary source on Boßler's place of birth and training is not to be found in any of these books.

When Johann Peter Boßler took over the godparenthood of a son of the master gunsmith Andreas Boßler the Elder (1673 – 1741) in Umstadt in 1719, he was named as the brother of the child's father. The origin of Johann Peter Boßler is therefore beyond doubt, since his brother Andreas Boßler the Elder clearly came from Lichtenberg and Johann Peter Boßler was confirmed there in 1701.

The ancestry of Boßler was thoroughly investigated by a relative. In the process, a Boßler gunsmith family from Lichtenberg (Fischbachtal) has been reconstructed, which held the court office of the Burgrave of Lichtenberg and from which Johann Peter Boßler also descended. Thus the court gunsmith belongs to the Lichtenberg tribe of the hessian Boßler family.

Through this evidence of Johann Peter Boßler's origins, secured in scholarly periodicals, it also became clear that he had been a great uncle of the dramatist and novelist Friedrich Maximilian Klinger. Johann Peter's grandson Heinrich Philipp Boßler was the original publisher of Haydn, Beethoven and Mozart.

== Legacy ==
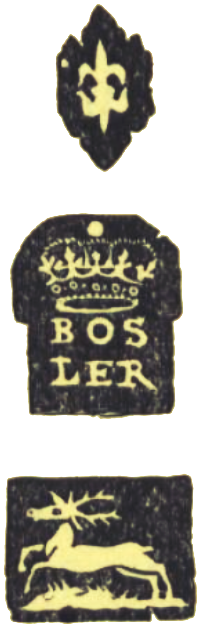
The crowned signature BOS/LER, the red deer master mark and the fleur-de-lis motif

Rifles made by Johann Peter Boßler can be found in the Dresden Armoury, the Danish War Museum or the Jagdmuseum Kranichstein, among others.

A flintlock shotgun made around 1730 for Günther XLIII of Schwarzburg-Sondershausen was wrongly attributed to Johann Peter's son Friedrich Jacob Boßler, who should have made this firearm when he was 13 years old.

The historical shotgun on display in the Dresden Armoury is masterfully crafted from both a technical and aesthetic point of view. Especially the impressive technical construction shows that Johann Peter Boßler was ahead of his time in terms of engineering. On the gun barrel of the shotgun, surrounded by six heraldic fleurs-de-lis, is a red deer, Boßler's master mark. Next to it is the signature BOS/LER crowned with the crown of the Hessian landgraves.

Not only Johann Peter Boßler explicitly used the signature Bosler a Darmstadt, but also his son Friedrich Jacob Boßler used it to sign his windchests.

Another wind rifle in the Dresden Armoury, erroneously attributed to Johann Peter Boßler in the older literature, was correctly made by his son Friedrich Jacob Boßler. The air rifle shows that the signature Bosler a Darmstadt was not used exclusively by Johann Peter but also by his son.
