= Through-composed music =

Relatively continuous, non-sectional, or non-repetitive music

In the theory of musical form, through-composed music is a continuous, non-sectional, and non-repetitive piece of music. The term is typically used to describe songs, but can also apply to instrumental music.

While most musical forms such as ternary form (ABA), rondo form (ABACABA), and sonata form (ABA') rely on repetition, through-composed music does not re-use material (ABCD). This constant introduction of new material is most noticeable in musical settings of poems, in contrast to the often used strophic form (AAA). Through-composed songs have different music for each stanza of the lyrics. The direct German translation durchkomponiert is also used to indicate this concept.

== Examples ==
Musicologist James Webster defines through-composed music in the following manner:

In general usage, a 'through-composed' work is one based on run-on movements without internal repetitions. (The distinction is especially characteristic of the literature of the art-song, where such works are contrasted with strophic settings.)

Many examples of this form can be found in Schubert's lieder, in which the words of a poem are set to music, and each line is different. In his lied "Erlkönig", in which the setting proceeds to a different musical arrangement for each new stanza and whenever the piece comes to each character, the character portrays its own voice register and tonality. Another example within instrumental music is Haydn's 'Farewell Symphony'.

== Opera and musicals ==
The term "through-composed" is also applied to opera and musical theater to indicate a work that consists of an uninterrupted stream of music from beginning to end, as in the operas of Wagner. This stands in contrast to the practice, as for example occurs in Mozart's Italian- and German-language operas, of having a collection of songs interrupted by recitative or spoken dialogue. Examples of the modern trend towards through-composed works in musical theater include the works of Andrew Lloyd Webber and Claude-Michel Schönberg. In musical theater, works with clear delineations between songs yet no spoken dialogue – such as Les Misérables or Hamilton – are usually instead referred to by the term "through-sung".

== In popular music ==
While through-composed form is very uncommon in popular music, several notable examples do exist:

- John Coltrane's album A Love Supreme avoids repeated themes through the entire suite.
- "2 + 2 = 5" by Radiohead shifts through four main sections, none of which repeat. Starting with the first part (in 7/8), each section gets progressively louder until the climax of the song's final portion.
- Trey Anastasio, guitarist and vocalist of the band Phish, has written many compositions that utilize through-composed structure. Examples include "You Enjoy Myself" (the band's signature song), "Guyute", "Divided Sky", "Reba", and "Foam".
- "In Dreams" by Roy Orbison features seven distinct sections, none of which repeat.
- "Happiness Is a Warm Gun" by The Beatles
- "Moodles" by Stereolab
- "Rudy" by Supertramp from the album "Crime of the Century"
- "Halo of Flies" by Alice Cooper
- "Down in a Hole" by Alice in Chains
- "Pretty in Possible" by Caroline Polachek features four main sections, none of which repeat.
- [Number[s] by Woe, is me is an entire album consisting only of songs where nothing repeats.
