= Friedrich Jacob Boßler =

German master gunsmith and airgun maker (1717–1793)

Friedrich Jacob Boßler [ˈbɔslɐ] also written Bossler and Bosler (18 March 1717 in Darmstadt; 7 April 1793 in Darmstadt) was a German master gunsmith and airgun maker of the 18th century.

As a court wind gun maker, he was in the service of Louis VIII of Hesse-Darmstadt, who was known as the hunting landgrave. Thanks to the outstanding craftsmanship and technical excellence of his wind rifles, Boßler is one of the most prominent figures in the history of hunting in Hesse-Darmstadt.

Along with his father Johann Peter Boßler, Friedrich Jacob Boßler was one of the few specialists for wind rifles among the gunsmiths of Europe. Already during his lifetime, technically high-value airguns made by Boßler were copied.

Boßler made hybrid hunting firearms that could be used with both flintlock and compressed air.

== Family ==
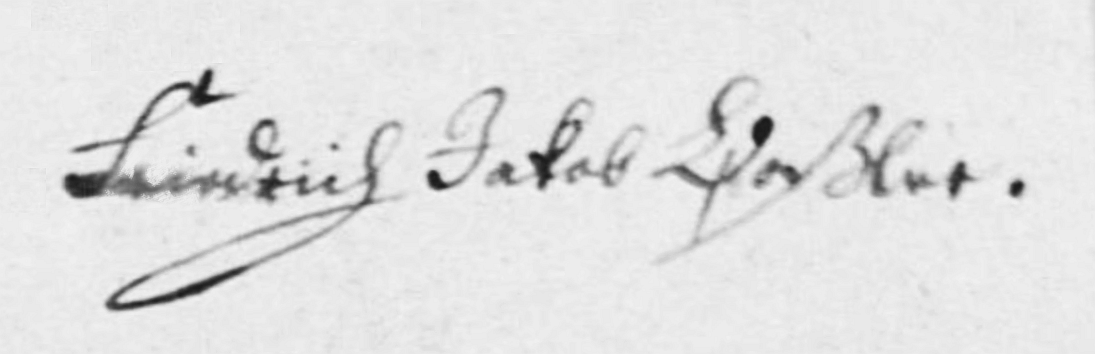
The legally valid signature of Friedrich Jacob Boßler differs from the artistic signature of F. J. Bosler on the rifles.

As the son of the master gunsmith and hesse-darmstadt court gunsmith Johann Peter Boßler, Friedrich Jacob came from the Boßler family in southern Hesse, which has been documented since 1616.

Friedrich Jacob Boßler's godfather was the valet of the Landgrave of Hesse-Darmstadt. His younger brother Johann Philipp Boßler (1731 – 1793) was also a court gunsmith but in Pirmasens. There he also belonged to the Leib-Grenadier-Garde-Regiment Erbprinz.

In 1743, the court wind gun maker Boßler married Catharina Justina Fischer (1717 – 1772) in Braubach, who was one of the daughters of a councillor and Stadtschultheiß. The marriage resulted from Heinrich Philipp Boßler one of the most renowned music publishers of his time and impresario of Mariane Kirchgessner, who associated with the greatest literary figures and composers of the 18th century.

Following tradition, Friedrich Jacob Boßler learned the exclusive handicraft of gunsmithing. He was not only named Hofwindbüchsenmacher in 1766. This designation for Boßler was already in use in 1749. His master's degree as a gunsmith is first associated with the year 1751.

== Legacy ==
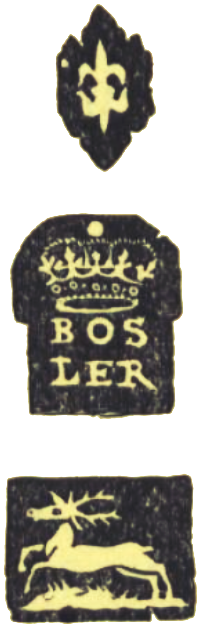
The crowned signature BOS/LER has been identified as the landgrave's crown on a wind gun made by Friedrich Jacob Boßler

A flintlock shotgun made around 1730 for Günther XLIII of Schwarzburg-Sondershausen was wrongly attributed to Johann Peter's son Friedrich Jacob Boßler, who should have made this firearm when he was 13 years old. The signature Bosler a Darmstadt on rifles made by the court gunsmiths Boßler cannot simply be attributed to Johann Peter Boßler, as his son Friedrich Jacob also used this signature. Proof of this is provided by a wind rifle by Friedrich Jacob Boßler preserved in the Dresden Armoury.

Historical rifles made by the wind gun makers Friedrich Jacob and Johann Peter Boßler came onto the art market from the important estate of the gun collector William Keith Neal.

Air rifles made by Friedrich Jacob Boßler can be found in the most renowned state weapons collections. These include the Dresden Armoury, the Livrustkammaren, the Danish War Museum, the Tower of London (Royal Armouries), the Kunsthistorische Museum Vienna, and the Hunting Museum of Jagdschloss Kranichstein. King George IV, while still Prince of Wales, moved a wind rifle from the manufactory of Friedrich Jacob Boßler from Carlton House to Windsor Castle.

Signed Bosler a Darmstadt, this "formidable historic hybrid flintlock and compressed air rifle" in the collection at Windsor Castle could be fired with both air pressure and explosive material.

== Importance ==
The landgraves of Hesse-Darmstadt used the Boßler wind rifles in diplomatic gift-giving. Only the Princes of the Holy Roman Empire who were equal to the landgraves received an air gun from the Boßler catalogue as a gift. Favourites were not, as is sometimes assumed, presented with a wind gun, which was reserved for the privilege of the high nobility.

Friedrich Jacob Boßler also made pistols. A pair of wind pistols made by him is considered the most beautiful ever made. A pair of flintlock pistols made by him had been in the Bayerisches Armeemuseum since 1905. It has been lost since 1944 and is considered a war loss.

As the court airgun maker to Landgrave Louis VIII of Hesse-Darmstadt, Boßler's works and he himself enjoyed a high reputation at court and the Landgrave held Boßler's rifles in particularly high esteem.

Wind rifle making was pioneered by Friedrich Jacob and his father Johann Peter Boßler. The weapons, which were considered avant-garde in the 18th century and were operated with air pressure instead of explosive material, offered a great advantage over conventional powder-operated rifles in terms of ignition, especially for hunting.
