= Symphony No. 52 (Haydn) =

Symphony in four movements by Joseph Haydn

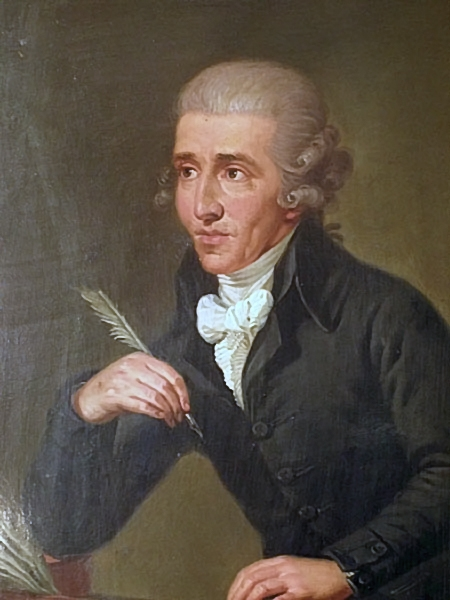
Portrait of Joseph Haydn by Ludwig Guttenbrunn, from c. 1770

The Symphony No. 52 in C minor is one of the last Sturm und Drang symphonies composed by the Austrian composer Joseph Haydn while the composer was in residence at Esterházy in 1771 or 1772.

It is one of a number of minor-key symphonies that Haydn composed in the late 1760s and early 1770s, the others being Symphonies Nos. 39, 44, 45, and 49. The symphony was described by H. C. Robbins Landon as "the grandfather of Beethoven's Fifth Symphony, also created with mathematical precision and in extreme conciseness."

== Music ==
The symphony is scored for two oboes, bassoon, two horns, continuo (harpsichord) and strings.

It has four movements:

1. Allegro assai con brio
2. Andante in C major, 3/8
3. Menuetto e trio. Allegretto, 3/4
4. Finale. Presto

The symphony has several distinct features. The first movement, written in sonata-allegro form, establishes a contrast between an agitated and forte opening theme in C minor, and a lyrical and piano second theme in the relative major (E♭). Somewhat unusually, Haydn presents the second theme twice with transitional material in between its appearances. As with his Symphony No. 45, the movement employs deceptive progressions in both the exposition (mm. 36–37) and recapitulation (mm. 130–131). The "anger and vehemence" established by the minor mode of the symphony surpasses Haydn's earlier minor key symphonic efforts.

== Liturgical use ==
It is possible that, as with several other symphonies by Haydn and Mozart, the Symphony no. 52 was written for the purpose of being incorporated into the Catholic liturgy. Haydn's early biographer Giuseppe Carpani noted:

Some other of Haydn's symphonies were written for the holy days. They were played in the chapel at Eisenstadt, in the chapel of the Imperial Court, and in other churches on such sacred feast days. They are written in G minor, D minor, and C minor.

It has been speculated that the C minor symphony refers to no. 52 based both on the date of composition, which coincided with the Austrian practice of performing symphonies during the liturgical service, and the fact that unlike Haydn's other C minor symphony to which Carpani may have been alluding (Symphony No. 78), no. 52 is a more serious work.
