= Christoph Kaufmann =

Swiss Sturm und Drang figure (1753–1795)

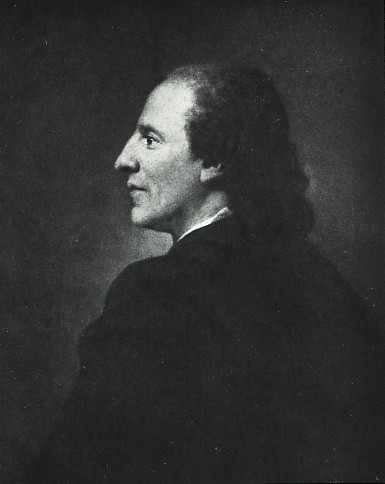
- Portrait by Anton Graff, 1794
- Born: 14 August 1753; Winterthur, Old Swiss Confederacy
- Died: 21 March 1795 (aged 41); Berthelsdorf near Herrnhut, Upper Lusatia
- Occupations: Apothecary's assistant; amateur physician
- Spouse: Elise (Lisette) Ziegler (m. 1778)
- Father: Christoph Adrian Kaufmann

Christoph Kaufmann (14 August 1753 – 21 March 1795) was a Swiss apothecary's assistant and amateur physician from Winterthur. Inspired by Jean-Jacques Rousseau, he proclaimed the ideals of the simple life, and with his unconventional dress he caused a sensation at princely courts and among leading intellectuals. He had his effect not through writings but through his appearance as an "apostle of genius" (Genieapostel), and he embodied the ideals of the young generation, for which he himself coined the term "Sturm und Drang".

== Biography ==
Christoph Kaufmann was born on 14 August 1753 in Winterthur, the son of Christoph Adrian Kaufmann, a master tanner (Gerbermeister), hospital clerk (Spitalschreiber), member of the Grand Council of Winterthur and Statthalter (deputy). In 1778 he married Elise (Lisette) Ziegler.

After a rudimentary schooling, Kaufmann began an apprenticeship as an apothecary in Bern in 1767. From 1774 he worked as an apothecary's assistant in Strasbourg, where, as an enthusiast of Rousseau, he founded the reform-pedagogical Strasbourg Brotherhood (Bruderbund). In 1775 he returned to Switzerland. He was in contact with Isaak Iselin, Johann Kaspar Lavater and Johann Georg Schlosser in Emmendingen (Breisgau).

In 1776–1777 Kaufmann traveled through Germany. He proclaimed the ideals of the simple life inspired by Rousseau. With his unconventional dress he caused a sensation at princely courts and among leading intellectuals, among them Johann Wolfgang von Goethe, Christoph Martin Wieland, Johann Gottfried Herder and Johann Georg Hamann. To live as a simple peasant, he withdrew in 1777 to Hegi Castle, and later to Glarisegg.

In 1781 Kaufmann studied medicine for several months in Breslau (Wrocław), without taking a degree. From 1782 he worked as an amateur physician (dilettierender Arzt) in communities of the Moravian Brethren (Herrnhuter). He died on 21 March 1795 in Berthelsdorf near Herrnhut, in Upper Lusatia.

Kaufmann had his effect not through writings but through his appearance as an "apostle of genius" (Genieapostel). He embodied the ideals of the young generation, for which he himself coined the term "Sturm und Drang", as a suggested title for a play by Friedrich Maximilian Klinger.

== Bibliography ==
- W. Milch, Christoph Kaufmann, 1932
- Neue Deutsche Biographie, 11, 347–349

=== Archives ===
- Unity Archives (Archiv der Brüdergemeine), Herrnhut
- Stadtbibliothek Winterthur
