= Heinrich Leopold Wagner =

Heinrich Wagner
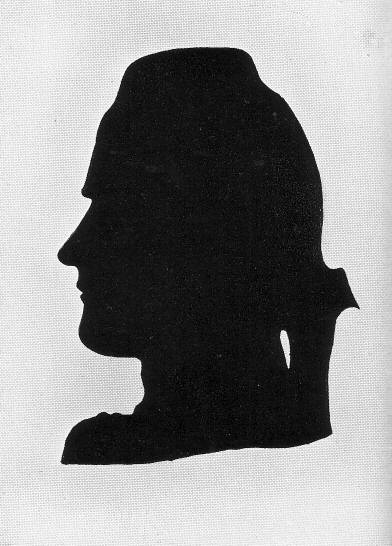
- Born: 19 February 1747; Strasbourg, France
- Died: 4 March 1779 (aged 32); Frankfurt, Free City of Frankfurt

Heinrich Leopold Wagner (19 February 1747 – 4 March 1779) was a German dramatist of the Sturm und Drang movement.

Wagner was born in Strasbourg as the eldest son of a merchant. After his school years in Strasbourg, he studied law. In 1773, he went to Saarbrücken, where he worked as a tutor at the court. From there in 1774 he travelled to Frankfurt am Main via Zweibrücken and Gießen. In 1776, he resumed his studies in Strasbourg and finished with his doctoral examination. From the 21 September 1776 he worked as a lawyer in Frankfurt. He married a widowed woman 18 years older than him and died on the 4 March 1779 at the young age of 32, probably from tuberculosis. Wagner had contact with several important writers of the Sturm und Drang movement, such as Johann Wolfgang von Goethe, Friedrich Maximillian Klinger, (1752–1831), Jakob Michael Reinhold Lenz, Christoph Kaufmann (1753–1795), Christian Friedrich Daniel Schubart (1739–1791) and Johann Friedrich Müller, known as Maler Müller, (1749–1825). Together with Klinger and Lenz Wangner was known by his contemporaries as a Goethianer, since these authors were among Goethe's closest friends. He was seen nonetheless as the least important of the Goethianer. His most important work was a play written in 1776 titled The Child Murderess, a societal critique typical of the Sturm und Drang movement. The work was reworked by Peter Hacks in 1957.

== Works ==
- Prometheus, Deukalion und seine Rezensenten, 1775
- Der wohltätige Unbekannte, 1775
- Die Reue nach der Tat, 1775
- Neuer Versuch über die Schauspielkunst, 1776, a translation of Louis-Sébastien Mercier's Du Théâtre ou nouvel essai sur l'art dramatique
- Leben und Tod Sebastian Silligs
- Die Kindermörderin, 1776
- Briefe, die Seylersche Gesellschaft betreffend, 1777
- Evchen Humbrecht oder Ihr Mütter merkts Euch!, 1778, a reworking of Die Kindermörderin
