= Symphony No. 39 (Haydn) =

Symphony composed by Joseph Haydn

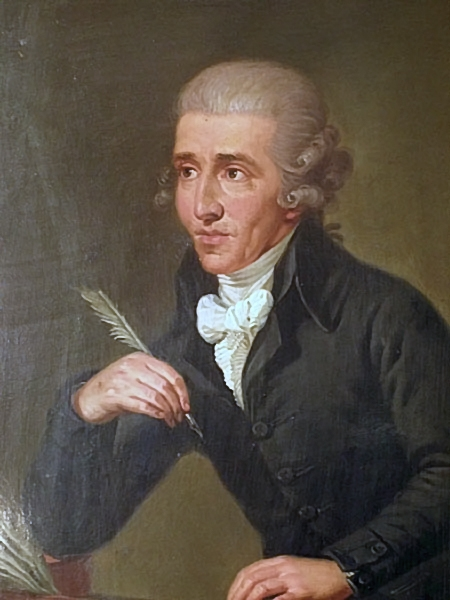
Portrait of Joseph Haydn by Ludwig Guttenbrunn, from c. 1770

Symphony No. 39 is a symphony in G minor (Hoboken 1/39) composed by Joseph Haydn, under the patronage of Prince Nikolaus Esterházy. Although the date of its composition is not certain, it is thought to have been written between May and September 1765, making it the earliest of Haydn's minor-key symphonies associated with his Sturm und Drang period (see also Symphony No. 26 and Symphony No. 45).

== Music ==
It is written for an orchestra consisting of two oboes, four horns (two in B♭ alto and two in G), and strings (violins divided into two, violas, cellos and double basses).

There are four movements:

1. Allegro assai, 4/4
2. Andante, 3/8 in E♭ major
3. Menuet & Trio, 3/4
4. Finale: Allegro di molto, 4/4

The opening movement features a nervously excited main theme interrupted by frequent pauses. Felix Diergarten has specifically analysed the pauses in the first movement in the symphony, with respect to symphonic form of the time. Both the first and second theme groups begin with the same two bars of melodic material.

In contrast to the Sturm und Drang of the opening movement, A.P. Brown describes the Andante as "one of Haydn's most galant slow movements, with its small meter signature, sixteenth triplets, slides, weak resolutions, echoes, and generally thin texture". The second movement is scored only for strings.

The minor mode returns for the Menuet which is contrasted by a bright major-mode Trio which features high notes for the first horn. The movement is in two-part counterpoint. Douglas Townsend opined that this movement "wears a little thin" because of the two-part writing.

The frenetic Sturm und Drang finale brings the symphony to an energetic conclusion, with significant changes in harmony and dynamics as well as wide melodic disjunct motion.

== Recordings ==
The symphony has been recorded many times, including by:

- Nikolaus Harnoncourt and Concentus Musicus Wien (Teldec, 1985)
- Christopher Hogwood and the Academy of Ancient Music (1983-1995)
- Ádám Fischer and the Austro-Hungarian Haydn Orchestra (Nimbus Records, 2001)
- Thomas Fey and the Heidelberg Symphony (Hänssler, 2004)
- Helmut Müller-Brühl and the Cologne Chamber Orchestra (Naxos, 2005)
- Alexander Liebreich and the Munich Chamber Orchestra (ECM, 2008)
- Moderntimes 1800 (Challenge Records, 2010)
- Ian Page and The Mozartists (Signum Records, 2020)

The recording by Trevor Pinnock and The English Concert was praised by ClassicsToday as:

Outstanding in every regard... No one with an interest in either the period or the composer can possibly afford to be without this set. The performances are simply magnificent! Pinnock’s periodist band sounds brilliantly accomplished throughout, and the recorded sound is clear, impactful, and detailed....Pinnock and his team give the most complete and sincere overview; and the recordings, originally issued on DG’s Archiv label are, as I’ve already suggested, beyond criticism. An essential purchase.

It has also been performed by Seiji Ozawa, Raymond Leppard, Riccardo Muti, and the St. Luke's Chamber Ensemble.
