= Sturm und Drang (play) =

Play by Friedrich Maximilian Klinger

Sturm und Drang is a play in five acts by Friedrich Maximilian Klinger, which gave its name to the artistic period known as Sturm und Drang. The play was first performed in Leipzig on 1 April 1777 by Abel Seyler's theatre company, where Klinger then was employed as a playwright. The play's original title was Wirrwarr; it was changed to Sturm und Drang before premiering.

== Background ==
In the autumn of 1776 Klinger wrote a comedy titled simply Wirrwarr ("confusion", "hubbub"). At that time he was already a well-known playwright; the year before, he had won a prize of 20 Louis d'or from the Ackermannschen Theatertruppe for his tragedy Die Zwillinge (de). Klinger had followed Goethe to Weimar. Christoph Kaufmann suggested the title Sturm und Drang ("storm and urge", "storm and stress") in a letter to Klinger. The piece was created in the year that is commonly seen as the high-water-mark of the Sturm und Drang movement.

Klinger brought the piece with him when he joined Abel Seyler's famed theatrical company. Klinger would be employed as a playwright by the company for two years. The company premiered Sturm und Drang in Leipzig on 1 April 1777. Neither the world premiere nor the subsequent performance in Klinger's hometown of Frankfurt were successful.

The influence of Shakespeare can be seen in the feud (reminiscent of Romeo and Juliet) between the Berkley and Bushy families. Additionally, the names "Bushy" and "Berkley" are borrowed from the surnames of two minor characters in Richard II; the name "La Feu" ("Lafew") comes from All's Well That Ends Well.

More important than this evidence of enthusiasm for Shakespeare and other authors, however, is the title Sturm und Drang itself, which soon became the watchword for an artistic movement.

== Characters ==
- Wild (alias Karl Bushy)
- La Feu and Blasius, two friends of Wild
- Lord Berkley
- Jenny Caroline, daughter of Lord Berkley
- Lady Kathrin, sister to Lord Berkley
- Louise, niece of Lord Berkley
- Captain Boyet (alias Harry Berkley, Lord Berkley's long-lost son)
- Lord Bushy, Wild's father
- A young Moor, Boyet's slave
- The landlord
- Betty, a servant

== Synopsis ==
The adventurous Wild has kidnapped his friends La Feu and Blasius against their will to America. There, Wild wants to participate in the American Revolutionary War (presumably on the side of the colonists). The trio stop at an inn; staying there also are the party of the aged Lord Berkley, his sister Lady Kathrin, his daughter Jenny Caroline, and their servant Louise. Berkley, ten years earlier, lost his estate through the actions of his enemies; he suspects that the mastermind is his former friend, Lord Bushy.

Wild and his friends meet the ladies of the Berkley party. La Feu falls in love with Lady Kathrin at first sight; Blasius, on the other hand, is bored with Louise. For her part, Caroline instantly recognizes Wild as her childhood sweetheart, Karl Bushy, the son and heir of her father's arch-enemy! The happy couple conceal Wild's true identity from Lord Berkley, who promises to procure a job in the army for Wild.

As Act 3 opens, Blasius and La Feu talk about Wild and the ladies. La Feu is still very enthusiastic about Lady Kathrin, which Blasius cannot understand because of her age. Blasius, sleepy and uninterested as usual, goes to bed.

Now the sea-captain Boyet arrives at the inn. Lord Berkley recognizes Captain Boyet as his long-lost son Harry, who has been missing since the raid on the Berkley estate ten years ago. Meanwhile, Boyet (alias Harry Berkley) has a history with Wild (alias Karl Bushy), for whom he feels a spontaneous aversion. The pair met and duelled once in Holland; now Boyet demands revenge for the wound he then received. In Wild's presence, Boyet triumphantly reports to his father that he has abandoned the old Lord Bushy in a small boat on the high seas, dooming Bushy to almost certain death. Wild angrily challenges Captain Boyet to a duel. Shortly thereafter, Lady Kathrin reveals to the Berkleys Wild's true identity, which she has learned from La Feu.

In Act 5, Wild and Boyet (that is, Karl and Harry) fight. Boyet is wounded in the calf and reluctantly recognizes Wild's bravery. Then, Wild receives word from the captain's slave-boy that, with the help of the ship's lieutenant, he had secretly brought old Bushy back on board Boyet's ship and not abandoned him at sea at all. In fact, the "dead" man suddenly appears, forgives his adversaries, and insists that he did not participate in the conspiracy against Berkley! Bushy does not reveal the real mastermind, as that man died long ago.

The old and the young Berkley hesitantly accept the offer of reconciliation, so deeply sits the hatred of long years. Nevertheless, the two reconcile and the feud is settled. Wild and Caroline can now devote themselves completely to their love. La Feu and Lady Kathrin also pair off to choose a romantic Arcadian existence herding sheep. Blasius, whose grumpiness permanently deterred Louise, goes off to become a hermit.

== Analysis ==
The names of impetuous Wild, romantic La Feu ("the fire"), and indifferent Blasius (whose name evokes the word "blasé") reflect their individual temperaments. The play is nominally set in the midst of the American Revolutionary War, but the war plays no part in the drama, which takes place entirely at an inn and is concerned entirely with the fortunes of the Bushy and Berkley families. However, as a backdrop, the colonists' violent rebellion is reminiscent of the kind of passionate individual expression celebrated by the Sturm und Drang movement.

An anonymous reviewer complained in 1778:

But how can a play be called tolerable with such a plot? One Lord Berkeley has, through one Bushy, lost his son. But where, how, when and why? nobody knows. The son returns as a sea-captain and is recognized by his father. How he was saved, how he comes to be a sea-captain; how he comes to his father's location, without knowing that he is there; this one also does not learn. A young man, who calls himself Wild, but who is the son of that Bushy, comes with two friends [...] How and why he came there; how and where he knew Berkley's daughter, with whom he is in love; and yet without knowing that her father and she are there; that is not said in the whole piece."

== Literature ==
- Ulrich Karthaus. Sturm und Drang. Epoche-Werke-Wirkung. München: C.H.Beck Verlag, 2. aktualisierte Auflage. 2007, S. 106-113.
- Werner Kließ. Sturm und Drang. Gerstenberg, Lenz, Klinger, Leisewitz, Wagner, Maler Müller. Hannover: Friedrich Verlag Velber 1. Aufl. 1966 S. 93-97.
- Klinger, Friedrich Maximilian. "Sturm und Drang". Projekt Gutenberg-DE. Archived from the original on October 13, 2014.. Text from Projekt Gutenberg-DE
