= Adagio and Rondo for glass harmonica, flute, oboe, viola and cello =

Composition by Wolfgang Amadeus Mozart

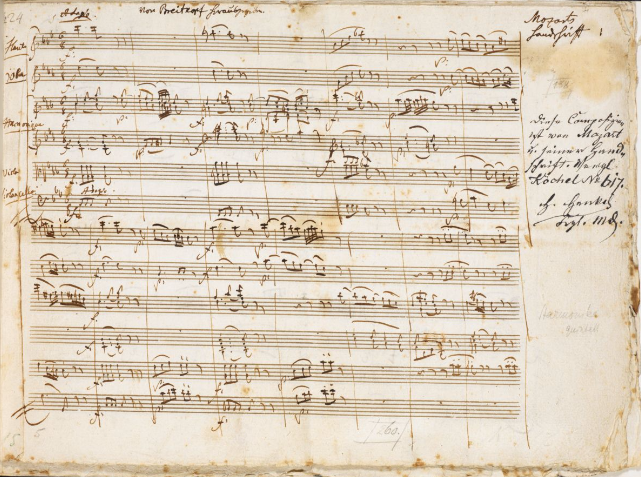
First page of the manuscript of Mozart's Adagio and Rondo K.617 in the Stefan Zweig collection of the British Library (Zweig MS 61)

The Adagio and Rondo, K. 617, is a quintet composed by Wolfgang Amadeus Mozart for glass harmonica, flute, oboe, viola and cello. Completed on May 23, 1791 (the date indicated in Mozart's own list of his works), it was written for Marianne Kirchgessner, a blind glass harmonica virtuoso, who played the first performance in the Burgtheater Akademie on June 10, 1791, and subsequently performed it at the Kärtnertortheater on August 19, 1791.

The autograph manuscript is in the British Library as part of the Stefan Zweig Collection. It was purchased by Zweig from a Berlin auction house in 1930.

The work was first published by Breitkopf & Härtel in 1799.

The adagio, in C minor, is 58 bars long, while the rondo, in C Major, contains 230 bars.

According to Willi Apel, "Among various compositions for the glass harmonica, Mozart's Adagio in C major (K. 356) and Adagio and Rondo (K. 617) ... both composed in 1791, are the most interesting. They seem to require an instrument equipped with a keyboard mechanism such as that constructed in 1784."

== Sources ==
- Köchel, Ludwig Ritter von Köchel (1964). Chronologisch-thematisches Verzeichnis sämtlicher Tonwerke Wolfgang Amade Mozarts : nebst Angabe der verlorengegangenen, angefangenen, von fremder Hand bearbeiteten, zweifelhaften und unterschobenen Kompositionen. Wiesbaden: Breitkopf & Härtel. pp. 703–704.
- Federhofer, Hellmut (1957). Kritsche Bericht: Quintette, Quartette und Trios mit Klavier und mit Glasharmonika. Vol. Serie VII, Werkgruppe 22, Abteilung 1. Kassel: Bärenreiter. pp. 79–82.
