= Heinrich Philipp Bossler =

German music publisher and impresario (1744–1812)

Heinrich Philipp Bossler also written Boßler [ˈbɔslɐ], (22 July 1744, Darmstadt – 8 September 1812, Leipzig) was a German music publisher and impresario. Among other things, he achieved his importance as a publisher of original compositions by the Viennese classics.

== Family ==
Bossler was born as the son of Friedrich Jacob Bossler (1717 – 1793), a court air gun maker for the landgraves of Hesse-Darmstadt, and a Schultheiss's daughter, Catharina Justina Fischer (1717 – 1772) from Braubach. His grandfather Johann Peter Bossler (1689 – 1742) is documented as a court gunsmith of the Hessian landgraves since 1715 and founded the Darmstadt branch of the Bossler family from southern Hesse.

Heinrich Philipp thus descended from a gunsmith family belonging to the hunting history of Hesse-Darmstadt, whose air rifles can be found in all the renowned gun collections of Europe.

Heinrich Philipp Boßler was a second cousin of the dramatist and novelist Friedrich Maximilian Klinger. Klinger's paternal grandmother and Boßler's paternal grandfather Johann Peter Boßler were siblings.

== Significance ==
Ludwig van Beethoven published his first compositions at the age of 12 in the Blumenlese für Klavierliebhaber, published by Heinrich Philipp Boßler. The music dealer Boßler also published well-known first and early prints by Wolfgang Amadé Mozart. The compositions of Joseph Haydn were treated with special distinction in Bossler's publishing house. As impresario of the successful star virtuoso on the glass harmonica Marianne Kirchgessner, Bossler undertook extensive concert tours throughout Europe and Russia.

Around 1779 he invented a machine to simplify music printing, which caused a sensation and enjoyed high acclaim. The publishing house subsequently founded by Heinrich Philipp Bossler in Speyer in 1780 was one of the most important music publishers of the time.

Heinrich Philipp Bossler was considered a pioneer in the field of music journalism. In addition, his invention of a music printing press for fast, inexpensive and precise printing of sheet music was highly respected. His publishing works belong to the realm of German cultural treasures and are marked by musicological relevance.

Heinrich Philipp Bossler refused to publish plagiarisms. This characteristic made his music publishing house almost unique by the standards of the time. Bossler also gained importance as the impresario of Marianne Kirchgessner.

== Music Journals ==
- Blumenlese für Klavierliebhaber. Eine musikalische Wochenschrift
- Bibliothek der Grazien. Eine Monatsschrift für Liebhaberinnen und Freunde des Gesangs und Klaviers
- Musikalische Korrespondenz der Teutschen Filharmonischen Gesellschaft

== Publisher ==
- Elementarbuch der Tonkunst zum Unterricht beim Klavier für Lehrende und Lernende

== Bibliography in English language ==
- Hans-Martin Plesske, Bossler, Heinrich Philipp Carl , at: Grove Music Online, 2001.

== Bibliography in German language ==
- Hubert Unverricht, Haydn und Bossler, at: Festskrift Jens Peter Larsen – 14.VI.1902 – 14.VI.1972. Herausgegeben von Nils Schiørring, Kopenhagen 1972, p. 285–300.
- Joshua Rifkin, Ein Haydn-Zitat bei Bossler, at: Haydn-Studien Bd. IV, Heft 1, Köln Mai 1976, p. 55–56.
- Hans Schneider, Der Musikverleger Heinrich Philipp Bossler 1744–1812. Mit bibliographischen Übersichten und einem Anhang Mariane Kirchgeßner und Boßler, Tutzing 1985, ISBN 3-7952-0500-X.
- Hans Schneider, Die musikalische Welt des jungen Beethoven – Beethovens Verleger Heinrich Philipp Boßler, Bonn 2001, ISBN 3-88188-064-X.
- Günther Grünsteudel, „Der König liebt seine Kompositionen ausserordentlich...“. Rosetti und Bossler in Berlin 1792, at: Rosetti-Forum, issue 6, 2005, ISSN 1615-5556 p. 23–32 (Digitalisat; PDF; 47 kB).
- Harald Hassler, Bossler, Heinrich Philipp, at: Musiklexikon in vier Bänden, 2nd updated and expanded edition, Vol. 2 – A to E, Stuttgart 2005, p. 325.
- Bill Oswald, Bossler, Heinrich Philipp, at: Stadtlexikon Darmstadt, Stuttgart 2006, ISBN 3-8062-1930-3, p. 96 (Digitalisat).
