= Jean Bosler =

French astronomer and author

- Bosler at the Fourth Conference International Union for Cooperation in Solar Research at Mount Wilson Observatory, 1910
- Born: 24 March 1878; Angers, France
- Died: 25 September 1973 (aged 95); Marseille, France
- Education: École Polytechnique
- Awards: Prix Jules Janssen
- Scientific career
- Workplaces: Marseille Observatory; University of Marseille

Jean Bosler (24 March 1878 – 25 September 1973) was a French astronomer and author of several books.

== Biography ==
Recruited by Deslandres as an astronomer at l’observatoire de Paris, Bosler discovered in 1908 in the spectrum of Comet Morehouse the spectral lines of ionized nitrogen, which was the first evidence of that element in comets. Much of his research was on the physical properties and orbits of comets.

He made a report on progress in astrophysics in the United States for the 1910 annual report of the Smithsonian Institution. In 1912, he showed in his doctoral dissertation (supervised by Henri Poincaré) that the Sun's magnetic field, by means of the intermediary of the solar wind, explains many aspects of cometary tails, the aurora borealis and aurora australis, solar storms and telluric currents. During a solar eclipse in 1914, Bosler observed in the corona a spectral band “nouvelle, intense et unique” which he suggested was spectral evidence for coronium; however, in the 1930s subsequent research showed that the cause was a highly ionized form of iron. In 1916, he published an analysis of the circular form of lunar craters as caused by the impact of meteors.

In 1923 Bosler was named director of Marseille Observatory, a post he occupied until his retirement in 1948. Simultaneously with his directorship, he taught at the University of Marseille from 1923 to 1948. Bosler made important contributions to the theory of the evolution of stars and published the first textbook in French that dealt with the then recent discoveries of Hubble and the work on optical phenomena of such physicists as Michelson, Fabry and Perot.

Bosler won the Prix Jules Janssen in 1911 from the Société astronomique de France, the French astronomical society, and the Prix Lalande from l'Académie des sciences in 1913.

He came from the French branch of the Hessian family Boßler.

== Books ==
- Les théories modernes du soleil (1910)
- L’évolution des étoiles (1923)
- Cours d’astronomie (1928)
