= The Child Murderess =

Play by Heinrich Leopold Wagner

The Child Murderess (German: Die Kindermörderin) is a play in six acts by German author Heinrich Leopold Wagner and an example of a Bürgerliches Trauerspiel (bourgeois tragedy). It takes place in Wagner's hometown Strasbourg and concerns a young girl who kills her child which had been conceived in a rape.

== Characters ==
- Evchen Humbrecht, a butcher's daughter
- Mrs. Humbrecht, her mother
- Martin Humbrecht, her father
- Master Humbrecht, her cousin
- Lieutenant von Gröningseck
- Lieutenant von Hasenpoth
- Mrs. Marthan, a washer woman

== Plot ==
An officer and two masked women, Evchen and Mrs. Humbrecht, enter a room. While the women think they are in an inn, the officer has actually brought them to a brothel. It turns out that Evchen and Mrs. Humbrecht used the absence of Mr. Humbrecht, a very strict and grumpy Strasbourg butcher, to visit a ball with the lieutenant von Gröningseck. The officer had then suggested a change of location to take a drink with his companions at about three o'clock in the morning and then return to the ball.

Von Gröningseck is flirting with the mother, but in fact has an eye on her 18-year-old daughter. He stuns Mrs. Humbrecht by means of a sleeping powder mixed into the wine and then rapes Evchen in a chamber. The girl, outraged and traumatized, is comforted by the officer's immediate promise to marry her. In five months he would be "majorenn", that is to say, he would be of age, and he would then fulfill his promise to save her reputation. Until then, Evchen assures him she will keep the night's events secret.

Soon it turns out that Evchen is pregnant, a fact she hides in front of her family and environment laboriously. When the five-month deadline draws near, von Gröningseck lets his comrade Lieutenant von Hasenpoth in on the secret. He needs two more months to accept an inheritance but still plans to marry the butcher's daughter, knowing that she does not befit his social status and he would have to quit the military service. During the conversation we learn that von Hasenpoth had laid out the plan for Evchen's rape, and had also given von Gröningseck the sleeping powder to silence the mother.

Shortly before von Gröningseck's expected return, Evchen receives a letter, supposedly by the lieutenant, in which he revokes his marriage promise. The young woman feels profoundly humiliated, fears the scandal of an illegitimate birth and secretly leaves her parents' house, where her peculiar behavior has caused tensions. When the Magister, who is aware of Evchen's tragic fate, talks to Mr. Humbrecht to mediate between the choleric father and his daughter, Evchen has already disappeared.

Evchen anonymously enters the service of washerwoman Mrs. Marthan. There she gives birth to her child, but to make matters worse she is unable to breast-feed. Evchen, who hardly leaves the house anymore, learns from Mrs. Marthan of a city rumor that Evchen's mother was a procuress and she herself a prostitute who has drowned herself in a river. Further, that subsequently, Evchen's mother died from shame and grief. Desperately, Evchen reveals her true identity to Mrs. Marthan and asks her to reveal Evchen's whereabouts to the father, and to collect the reward he has advertised for this information. With Mrs. Marthan gone, Evchen kills the hungry screaming child with a sewing needle.

In the last act, the principal characters meet again. Von Gröningseck reveals that the letter in which he revokes the marriage promise was not written by him, and that it must have been a scheme by von Hasenpoth. Evchen expects the death penalty, which she wants to accept as a child and supposed mother murderer. Von Groeningseck plans to appeal for leniency for Evchen. For this, if necessary, he will petition the King of France. (Note that Strasbourg had been a part of France since 1681, but remained German and Lutheran for a long time). Mr. Humbrecht, who has become increasingly placable, promises Von Groeningseck every financial support.
