= James Webster (musicologist) =

Musicologist

James Webster is a musicologist, specializing in the music of Joseph Haydn and other composers of the classical era. His professional position is as the Goldwin Smith Professor of Music at Cornell University.

== Research and writing ==
He has published several books in his field, including a massive study of Haydn's "Farewell" Symphony and (with Georg Feder) the Haydn article in the current edition of the New Grove, spun off as a separate book.

His website lists the following areas of specialization (links to articles in this encyclopedia are added):

- History and theory of music of the eighteenth and nineteenth centuries, with a particular focus on Haydn
- Mozart (especially his operas), Beethoven, Schubert, and Brahms
- Performance practice
- Editorial practice
- Historiography of music
- Issues of musical form (including analytical methodology)
- Schenkerian analysis

Webster's work is notable for his willingness to sift through and assess conflicting sources of historical evidence. His biography of Haydn particularly reflects this tendency, and unlike several earlier Haydn biographers, he is generally unwilling to fill in the narrative with conjecture, particularly conjecture about how Haydn must have felt or what he must have done on some particular occasion.

Webster is highly devoted to the earlier works of Haydn, and has consistently asserted his opposition to the views of Charles Rosen and others who assert a course of "progress" and learning through the composer's career. He has expressed strong views on the quality of current urtext editions and their appropriateness for use in performance; for quotations and discussion see Urtext edition.

== Books authored and edited ==
- Webster, James; Caplin, William; and Hepokoski, James (2009) Musical Form, Forms, and Formenlehre: Three Methodological Reflections. Ed. Berge, Pieter. Leuven: Leuven University Press.
- Webster, James and Georg Feder (2002) The New Grove Haydn. London: Macmillan; New York: Palgrave, 2002.
- Opera Buffa in Mozart's Vienna. Ed. Mary Hunter and James Webster. Cambridge: Cambridge Univ. Press, 1997.
- Webster, James (1991) Haydn's "Farewell" Symphony and the Idea of Classical Style: Through-Composition and Cyclic Integration in His Instrumental Music. Cambridge: Cambridge Univ. Press.
- Haydn Studies: Proceedings of the International Haydn Conference, Washington, D.C., 1975. Ed. Jens Peter Larsen, Howard Serwer, and James Webster. New York: Norton, 1981. [includes seven articles by James Webster]

== Honors ==
Webster is the dedicatee of a festschrift volume published 2014 by Cambridge University Press, with contributions by colleagues including Elaine Sisman, Neal Zaslaw, and Lewis Lockwood; see References below.
