= Edmund Alexander de Schweinitz =

Edmund Alexander de Schweinitz (20 March 1825 in Bethlehem, Pennsylvania – 18 December 1887) was an American bishop of the Moravian Church.

He studied theology at the Moravian College there and at Berlin. He entered the ministry in 1850 and after some years of pastoral life, became in 1870 Bishop of the Moravian church. He founded the Moravian, the weekly journal of his Church, in 1856 and for 10 years was its editor. He was the author of:

- The Moravian Manual (1859)
- The Moravian Episcopate (1865)
- The Life and Times of David Zeisberger (1870)
- Some of the Fathers of the Moravian Church (1881)
- The History of the Church Known as the Unitas Fratrum; or, The Unity of the Brethren, Founded by the Followers of John Hus (1885)

Schweinitz's son George Edmund de Schwenitz was a leading eye specialist who served as the ophthalmologist for Woodrow Wilson.
