= Horn (heraldry) =

Common features in crests in Scandinavian and German heraldry

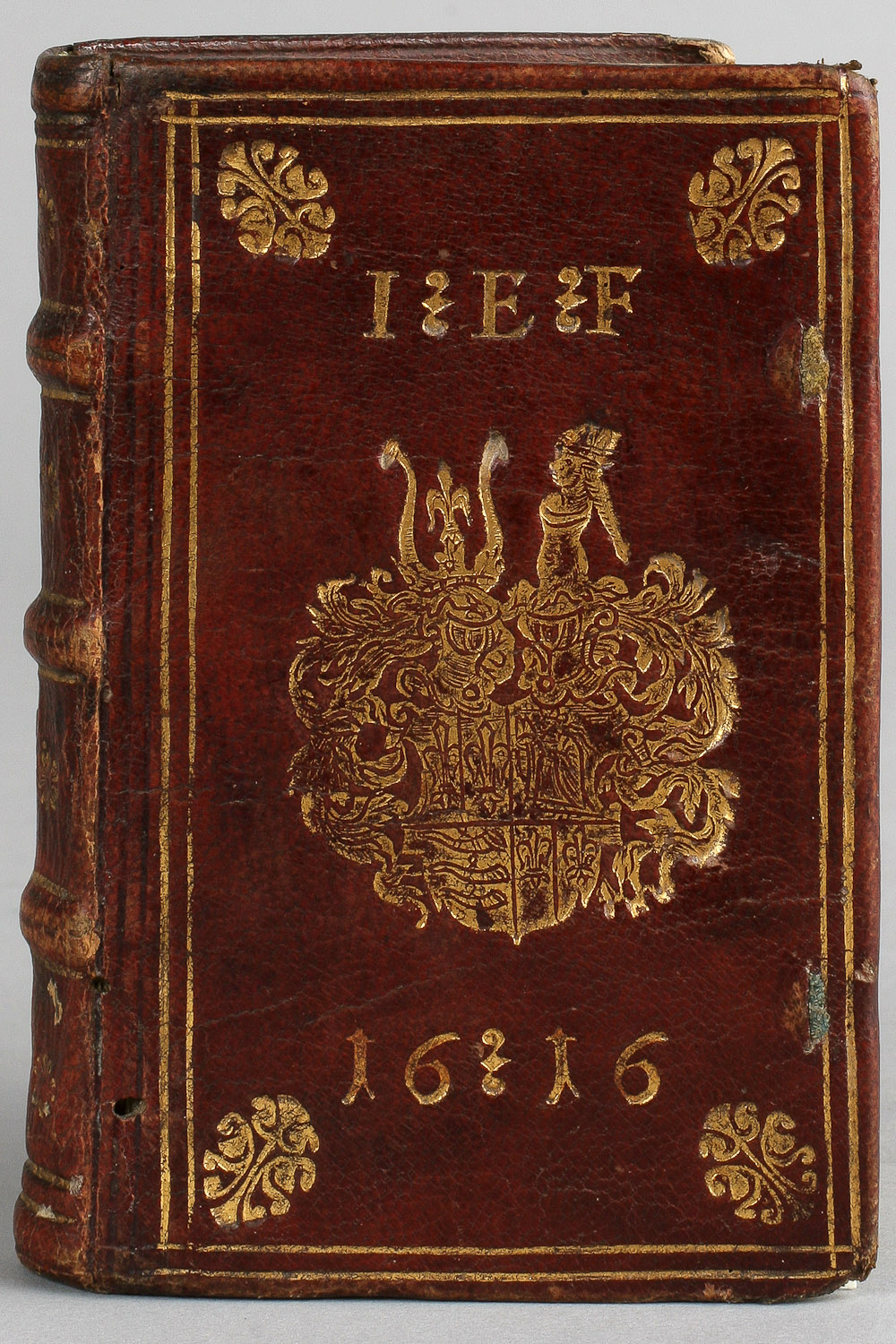
Horns in a crest of the Fugger von Kirchberg und Weißenhorn arms

Horn (Danish: vesselhorn) are common features in crests in Scandinavian and German heraldry, although rare in other heraldic traditions. As these horns, almost always in a pair, were often drawn with an open ring at the tip, they have sometimes been altered into elephant trunks or trumpets.
