= Symphony No. 26 (Haydn) =

Symphony by Joseph Haydn

- Lamentatione
- by Joseph Haydn
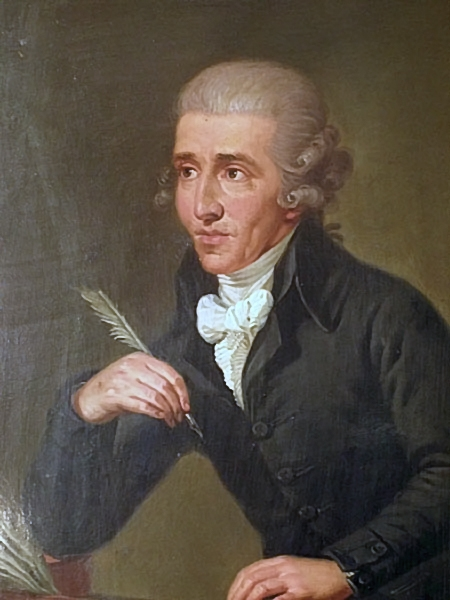
- Portrait of Joseph Haydn, ca. 1770
- Key: D minor
- Catalogue: Hob. I:26
- Composed: 1768/69
- Duration: c. 20 minutes
- Movements: 3
- Scoring: Orchestra

The Symphony No. 26 in D minor, Hob. I:26, is one of the early Sturm und Drang symphonies written by Joseph Haydn. It was written under the auspices of Prince Nikolaus Esterházy, and is from the late 1760s, when Haydn began to experiment with minor key symphonic writing. It is also one of his first minor key symphonies.

Since Haydn's day, the symphony has been known as Lamentatione or Lamentation because of the Christus motif of the opening movement's second theme. As with most of the nicknamed symphonies, the title is not Haydn's own.

== Background ==
Haydn wrote the symphony for Easter week. H. C. Robbins Landon has dated it to 1768 (possibly 1769). In the absence of the original autograph, it is impossible to verify the date of composition, although this dating is consistent with the work's appearance in the Entwurf Katalog (Haydn's own catalogue of his works). An earlier tradition suggested the symphony had been written for Christmas (at the time a much less significant religious holiday), but the oldest original extant manuscript indicates clearly that the piece was indeed intended for Easter celebrations.

It is an early example of the Sturm und Drang style that would characterize much of Haydn's symphonic output during the period from 1774 to 1775.

Because of its association with Easter week, Haydn incorporates a melody derived from an old plainsong chant of the Passion of Christ, interpolating (as the second theme) this familiar liturgical setting to contrast with the furious opening theme. The same lament is also picked up in the second movement, reinforcing the symphony's link to the Passion through evocation of a melody that would have been familiar to audiences of the time.

== Music ==
The symphony is scored for two oboes, bassoon, two horns, basso continuo, and a string section containing first and second violins, violas, cellos and double basses.

It is in three movements, ending with a minuet and trio:

1. Allegro assai con spirito, 4/4
2. Adagio, 2/4 in F major
3. Minuet e Trio, 3/4, trio in D major

== See also ==
- List of symphonies by name
