= Marianne Kirchgessner =

German glass harmonica player (1769–1808)

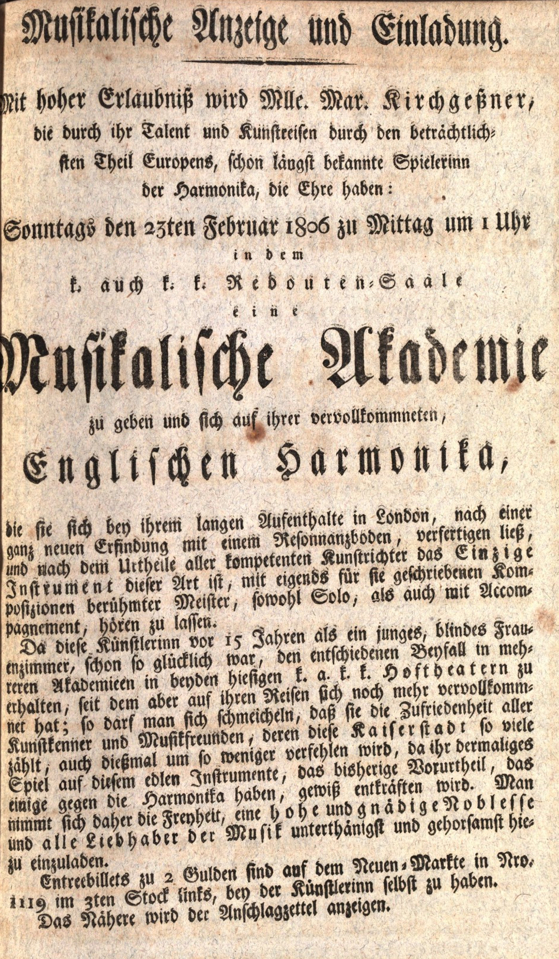
Harmonica 1.

Marianne Antonia Kirchgessner, also Mariana Kirchgessner, Kirchgäßner, (5 June 1769 in Bruchsal, Holy Roman Empire, – 9 December 1808), was a German glass harmonica player. She was blind from eye disease caused by smallpox when she was four years old. Kirchgessner's artistic qualities brought her the attention of great composers such as Muzio Clementi, Johann Gottlieb Naumann, Johann Friedrich Fasch, Johann Friedrich Reichardt and Franz Anton Hoffmeister.

Wolfgang Amadeus Mozart, in Vienna, in the last year of his life, composed for her—producing one of the best-known works for this instrument, the Quintet Adagio and Rondo for glass harmonica, flute, oboe, viola and cello in C major K. 617, as well as the Adagio for glass harmonica solo K. 356/617a.

== Life ==
As the fifth daughter of Joseph Anton Kirchgäßner, a chamber paymaster from Speyer, and his wife Maria Teresa, née Waßmuthin, she began playing the clavier with great skill and expression at the age of 6. At 11 she commenced instruction on the glass harmonica with Kapellmeister Joseph Aloys Schimittbauer (1718–1809) in Karlsruhe, which lasted ten years. In the spring of 1791 she went on her first tour in the company of music journalist and biographer Heinrich Philipp Bossler (1744–1812) and his wife.

After that, she traveled throughout Europe for ten years, visiting Prague, Dresden, Leipzig, Berlin, Hamburg, and Magdeburg. She played four times at the Prussian court for King Friedrich Wilhelm II in Berlin. During her two-year stay in London between 1794 and 1796, the German-born mechanic Fröschela built a new instrument for her. She used that instrument on all her subsequent tours.

She continued touring and giving concerts in Hanover, Frankfurt, Stuttgart, Leipzig, Berlin—and in Carlsbad, where she met Johann Wolfgang von Goethe in the summer of 1808. A concert tour in the cold winter of that year was Marianne's first and last visit to Switzerland. She caught a cold on a journey from Radbruch to Odenheim, and then on to Schaffhausen. She died of fever due to lung inflammation in the early hours of 9 December 1808.

== Gallery ==
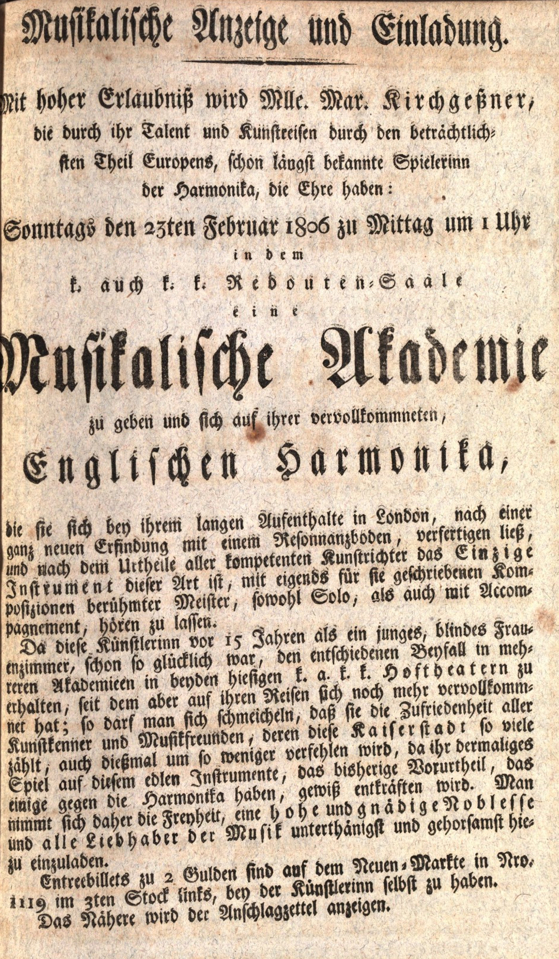
Kirchgessner's Concert in Vienna (1806).

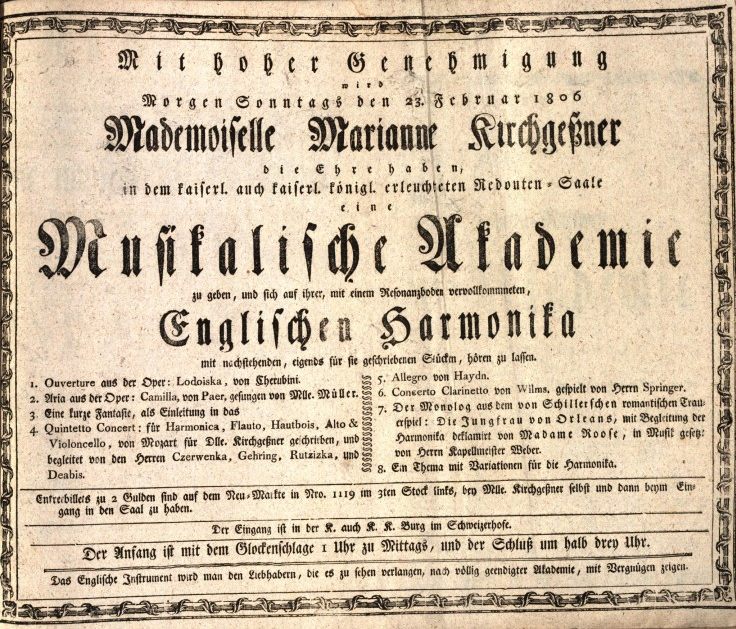
Kirchgessner's Concert in Vienna (Mozart's K. 617).

== Literature ==
- Bruno Hoffmann: Ein Leben für die Glasharfe, Niederland-Verlag, Backnang 1983, ISBN 3-923947-06-2
- Hermann Josef Ullrich: Die blinde Glasharmonikavirtuosin Marianne Kirchgeßner und Wien. Eine Künstlerin der empfindsamen Zeit, Verlag Hans Schneider, Tutzing 1971
