= Sturm und Drang =

Proto-Romanticist movement in German literature and music

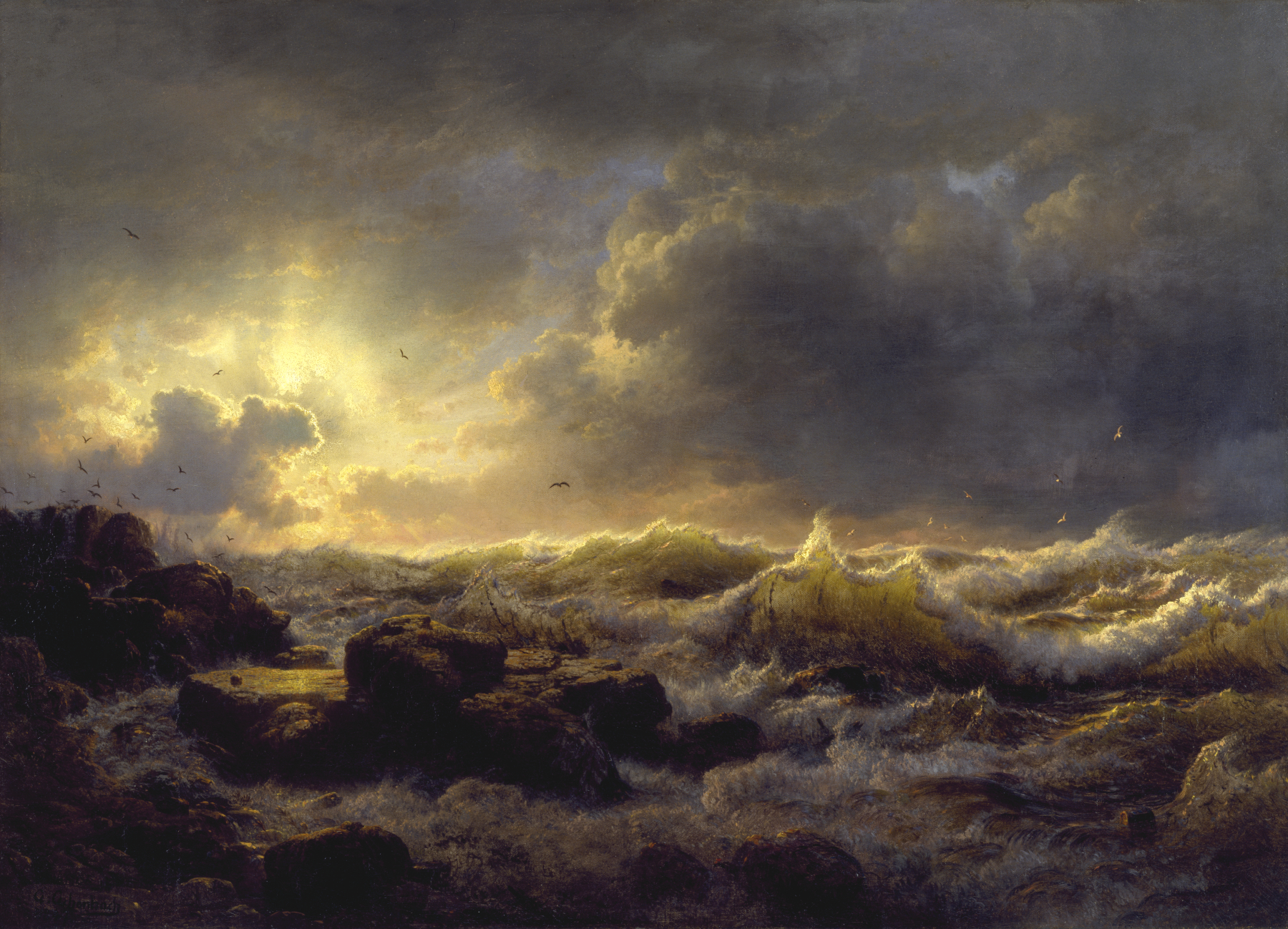
Clearing Up: Coast of Sicily, Andreas Achenbach, 1847

Sturm und Drang (/ˌʃtʊərm ʊnt ˈdræŋ, - ˈdrɑːŋ/, German: [ˈʃtʊʁm ʔʊnt ˈdʁaŋ]; usually translated as "storm and stress") was a proto-Romanticist movement in German literature and music that occurred between the late 1760s and early 1780s. Within the movement, individual subjectivity and, in particular, extremes of emotion were given free expression in reaction to the perceived constraints of rationalism imposed by the Enlightenment and associated aesthetic movements. The period is named after Friedrich Maximilian Klinger's play of the same name, which was first performed by Abel Seyler's famed theatrical company in 1777. Seyler's son-in-law Johann Anton Leisewitz wrote the early and quintessential Sturm und Drang play, Julius of Taranto, with its theme of the love triangle and conflict between two brothers and the woman which they both love.

Significant figures were Johann Anton Leisewitz, Jakob Michael Reinhold Lenz, H. L. Wagner, Friedrich Maximilian Klinger, and Johann Georg Hamann. Johann Wolfgang von Goethe and Friedrich Schiller were notable proponents of the movement early in their lives, although they ended their period of association with it by initiating what would become Weimar Classicism.

== History ==
=== Counter-Enlightenment ===
French neoclassicism (including French neoclassical theatre), a movement beginning in the early Baroque, with its emphasis on the rational, was the principal target of rebellion for adherents of the Sturm & Drang movement. For them, sentimentality and an objective view of life gave way to emotional turbulence and individuality, and Age of Enlightenment ideals such as rationalism, empiricism, and universalism no longer captured the human condition; emotional extremes and subjectivity became the vogue during the late 18th century.

=== Etymology ===
A silhouette of the theatre director Abel Seyler

The phrase Sturm und Drang first appeared as the title of a play by Friedrich Maximilian Klinger, written for Abel Seyler's Seylersche Schauspiel-Gesellschaft and published in 1776. The setting of the play is the unfolding American Revolution, in which the author gives violent expression to difficult emotions and extols individuality and subjectivity over the prevailing order of rationalism. Though it is argued that literature and music associated with Sturm und Drang predate this seminal work, it was from this point that German artists became distinctly self-conscious of a new aesthetic. This seemingly spontaneous movement became associated with a wide array of German authors and composers of the mid-to-late Classical period.

Sturm und Drang came to be associated with literature or music aimed at shocking the audience or imbuing them with extremes of emotion. The movement soon gave way to Weimar Classicism and early Romanticism, whereupon a socio-political concern for greater human freedom from despotism was incorporated along with a religious treatment of all things natural.

There is much debate regarding whose work should or should not be included in the canon of Sturm und Drang. One point of view would limit the movement to Goethe, Johann Gottfried Herder, Jakob Michael Reinhold Lenz, and their direct German associates writing works of fiction and/or philosophy between 1770 and the early 1780s. The alternative perspective is that of a literary movement inextricably linked to simultaneous developments in prose, poetry, and drama, extending its direct influence throughout the German-speaking lands until the end of the 18th century. Nevertheless, the originators of the movement came to view it as a time of premature exuberance that was then abandoned in favor of often conflicting artistic pursuits.

=== Related aesthetic and philosophical movements ===
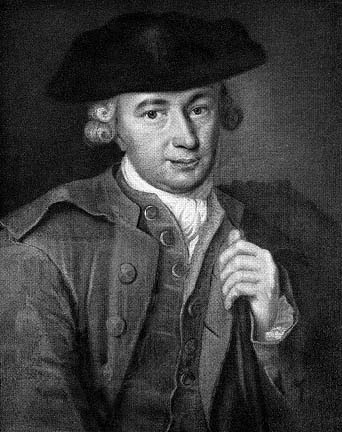
Johann Georg Hamann

As a precursor to Sturm und Drang, the literary topos of the Kraftmensch existed among dramatists beginning with F.M. Klinger. Its expression is seen in the radical degree to which individuality need appeal to no outside authority save the self nor be tempered by rationalism. These ideals are identical to those of Sturm und Drang, and it can be argued that the later name exists to catalog a number of parallel, co-influential movements in German literature rather than express anything substantially different from what German dramatists were achieving in the violent plays attributed to the Kraftmensch movement.

Major philosophical/theoretical influences on the literary Sturm und Drang movement were Johann Georg Hamann (especially the 1762 text Aesthetica in nuce. Eine Rhapsodie in kabbalistischer Prose) and Johann Gottfried Herder, both from Königsberg, and both formerly in contact with Immanuel Kant. Significant theoretical statements of Sturm und Drang aesthetics by the movement's central dramatists themselves include Lenz' Anmerkungen übers Theater and Goethe's Von deutscher Baukunst and Zum Schäkespears Tag (sic). The most important contemporary document was the 1773 volume Von deutscher Art und Kunst. Einige fliegende Blätter, a collection of essays that included commentaries by Herder on Ossian and Shakespeare, along with contributions by Goethe, Paolo Frisi (in translation from the Italian), and Justus Möser.

== In literature ==
=== Characteristics ===
The protagonist in a typical Sturm und Drang stage work, poem, or novel is driven to action—often violent action—not by pursuit of noble means nor by true motives, but by revenge and greed. Goethe's unfinished Prometheus exemplifies this along with the common ambiguity provided by juxtaposing humanistic platitudes with outbursts of irrationality. The literature of Sturm und Drang features an anti-aristocratic slant while seeking to elevate all things humble, natural, or intensely real (especially whatever is painful, tormenting, or frightening).

The story of hopeless love and eventual suicide presented in Goethe's sentimental novel Die Leiden des jungen Werthers (1774) is an example of the author's tempered introspection regarding his love and torment. Friedrich Schiller's drama, Die Räuber (1781), provided the groundwork for melodrama to become a recognized dramatic form. The plot portrays a conflict between two aristocratic brothers, Franz and Karl Moor. Franz is cast as a villain attempting to cheat Karl out of his inheritance, though the motives for his action are complex and initiate a thorough investigation of good and evil. Both of these works are seminal examples of Sturm und Drang in German literature.

The absence or exclusion of women writers from accounts of Sturm und Drang can be taken as a consequence of the movement's and the period's masculinist ethos or as a failure of more recent literary criticism to engage with literary works by women—such as Marianne Ehrmann—that might merit inclusion.

=== Notable literary works ===
- Johann Wolfgang von Goethe (1749–1832):
  - Zum Shakespears Tag (1771)
  - Sesenheimer Lieder (1770–1771)
  - Prometheus (1772–1774)
  - Götz von Berlichingen (1773)
  - Clavigo (1774)
  - Die Leiden des jungen Werthers (1774)
  - Mahomets Gesang (1774)
  - Adler und Taube (1774)
  - An Schwager Kronos (1774)
  - Gedichte der Straßburger und Frankfurter Zeit (1775)
  - Stella. Ein Schauspiel für Liebende (1776)
  - Die Geschwister (1776)
- Friedrich Schiller (1759–1805):
  - Die Räuber (1781)
  - Die Verschwörung des Fiesko zu Genua (1783)
  - Kabale und Liebe (1784)
  - An die Freude (1785)
- Jakob Michael Reinhold Lenz (1751–1792)
  - Anmerkung über das Theater nebst angehängtem übersetzten Stück Shakespeares (1774)
  - Der Hofmeister oder Vorteile der Privaterziehung (1774)
  - Lustspiele nach dem Plautus fürs deutsche Theater (1774)
  - Die Soldaten (1776)
- Friedrich Maximilian Klinger (1752–1831):
  - Das leidende Weib (1775)
  - Sturm und Drang (1776)
  - Die Zwillinge (1776)
  - Simsone Grisaldo (1776)
- Gottfried August Bürger (1747–1794):
  - Lenore (1773)
  - Gedichte (1778)
  - Wunderbare Reisen zu Wasser und zu Lande, Feldzüge und lustige Abenteuer des Freiherren von Münchhausen (1786)
- Heinrich Wilhelm von Gerstenberg (1737–1823):
  - Gedichte eines Skalden (1766)
  - Briefe über Merkwürdigkeiten der Literatur (1766–67)
  - Ugolino (1768)
- Johann Georg Hamann (1730–1788):
  - Sokratische Denkwürdigkeiten für die lange Weile des Publikums zusammengetragen von einem Liebhaber der langen Weile (1759)
  - Kreuzzüge des Philologen (1762)
- Johann Jakob Wilhelm Heinse (1746–1803):
  - Ardinghello und die glückseligen Inseln (1787)
- Johann Gottfried Herder (1744–1803):
  - Fragmente über die neuere deutsche Literatur (1767–1768)
  - Kritische Wälder oder Betrachtungen, die Wissenschaft und Kunst des Schönen betreffend, nach Maßgabe neuerer Schriften (1769)
  - Journal meiner Reise im Jahre (1769)
  - Abhandlung über den Ursprung der Sprache (1770)
  - Von deutscher Art und Kunst, einige fliegende Blätter (1773)
  - Volkslieder (1778–79)
  - Vom Geist der Hebräischen Poesie (1782–1783)
  - Ideen zur Philosophie der Geschichte der Menschheit (1784–1791)

== In music ==
The Classical period music (1750–1800) associated with Sturm und Drang is predominantly written in a minor key to convey difficult or depressing sentiments. The principal themes tend to be angular, with large leaps and unpredictable melodic contours. Tempos and dynamics change rapidly and unpredictably in order to reflect strong changes of emotion. Pulsing rhythms and syncopation are common, as are racing lines in the soprano or alto registers. Writing for string instruments features tremolo and sudden, dramatic dynamic changes and accents.

=== History ===
Musical theater became the meeting place of the literary and musical strands of Sturm und Drang, with the aim of increasing emotional expression in opera. The obligato recitative is a prime example. Here, orchestral accompaniment provides an intense underlay of vivid tone-painting to the solo recitative. Christoph Willibald Gluck's 1761 ballet, Don Juan, heralded the emergence of Sturm und Drang in music; the program notes explicitly indicated that the D minor finale was to evoke fear in the listener. Jean-Jacques Rousseau's 1762 play, Pygmalion (first performed in 1770) is a similarly important bridge in its use of underlying instrumental music to convey the mood of the spoken drama. The first example of melodrama, Pygmalion influenced Goethe and other important German literary figures.

Nevertheless, relative to the influence of Sturm und Drang on literature, the influence on musical composition was limited, and many efforts to label music as conforming to this trend are tenuous at best. Vienna, the center of German/Austrian music, was a cosmopolitan city with an international culture; therefore, melodically innovative and expressive works in minor keys by Haydn or Mozart from this period should generally be considered first in the broader context of musical developments taking place throughout Europe. The clearest musical connections to the self-styled Sturm und Drang movement can be found in opera and the early predecessors of program music, such as Haydn's Farewell Symphony. Beethoven, Weber, and even Schubert have elements of Sturm und Drang.

=== Haydn ===
A Sturm und Drang period is often attributed to the works of the Austrian composer Joseph Haydn from the late 1760s to early 1770s. Works during this period often feature a newly impassioned or agitated element; however, Haydn never mentions Sturm und Drang as a motivation for his new compositional style, and there remains an overarching adherence to classical form and motivic unity. Though Haydn may not have been consciously affirming the anti-rational ideals of Sturm und Drang, one can certainly perceive the influence of contemporary trends in musical theatre on his instrumental works during this period.

=== Mozart ===
Mozart's Symphony No. 25 (the "Little" G-minor symphony, 1773) is one of only two minor-key symphonies by the composer. Beyond the atypical key, the symphony features rhythmic syncopation along with the jagged themes associated with Sturm und Drang. More interesting is the emancipation of the wind instruments in this piece, with the violins yielding to colorful bursts from the oboe and flute. However, it is likely a response to numerous minor-key works by the Czech composer Johann Baptist Wanhal (a Viennese contemporary and acquaintance of Mozart), rather than a self-avowed adherence to a German literary movement, which is responsible for the harmonic and melodic experiments in the Symphony no. 25.

=== Notable composers and works ===
- Carl Philipp Emanuel Bach
  - Symphonies, keyboard concertos and sonatas including Symphony in E minor Wq. 178 (1757–62)
- Johann Christian Bach
  - Symphony in G minor Op. 6 No. 6
- Johann Christoph Friedrich Bach
  - Oratorio Die Auferweckung des Lazarus
  - Cantata Cassandra
- Wilhelm Friedemann Bach
  - Adagio und Fuge in D minor Falk 65
- Joseph Haydn
  - Symphony No. 39 in G minor (1767)
  - Symphony No. 49 in F minor La Passione (1768)
  - Symphony No. 26 in D minor Lamentatione (1769)
  - Symphony No. 52 in C minor (1771)
  - Symphony No. 44 in E minor Trauer (Mourning) (1772)
  - Symphony No. 45 in F sharp minor Farewell (1772)
  - String Quartet No. 11 in D minor, Op. 9 No. 4 (1769)
  - String Quartet No. 19 in C minor, Op. 17 No. 4 (1771)
  - String Quartet No. 23 in F minor, Op. 20 No. 5 (1772)
  - String Quartet No. 26 in G minor, Op. 20 No. 3 (1772)
  - Piano Sonata Hob. XVI/47 in E minor (1765-67)
  - Piano Sonata Hob. XVI/20 in C minor (1771)
  - Piano Sonata Hob. XVI/44 in G minor (1771-73)
  - Piano Sonata Hob. XVI/32 in B minor (1774-76)
- Joseph Martin Kraus
  - Symphony in C minor Symphonie funebre
  - Symphony in C-sharp minor
- Wolfgang Amadeus Mozart
  - Symphony No. 25 in G minor, K. 183 (1773)
  - String Quartet No. 13 in D minor, K. 173 (1773)
  - Violin Sonata No. 21 in E minor, K. 304 (1778)
  - Piano Sonata No. 8 in A minor, K. 310 (1778)
- Johann Gottfried Müthel
  - Works for keyboard
- Johann Baptist Wanhal
  - Symphony in E minor (Bryan e3) (1760-62)
  - Symphony in E minor (Bryan e1) (1764-67)
  - Symphony in C minor (Bryan c2) (1764-67)
  - Symphony in G minor (Bryan g2) (1764-67)
  - Symphony in D minor (Bryan d1) (1767-68)
  - Symphony in G minor (Bryan g1) (1767-68)
  - Symphony in A minor (Bryan a2) (1769-71)
  - Symphony in E minor (Bryan e2) (1771-73)
  - Symphony in D minor (Bryan d2) (1773-74)
  - Symphony in A minor (Bryan a1) (1773-74)
  - Symphony in F minor (Bryan f1) (1773-74)
- Ernst Wilhelm Wolf
  - Works for keyboard

== In visual art ==
The parallel movement in the visual arts can be witnessed in paintings of storms and shipwrecks showing the terror and irrational destruction wrought by nature. These pre-romantic works were fashionable in Germany from the 1760s on through the 1780s, illustrating a public audience for emotionally provocative artwork. Additionally, disturbing visions and portrayals of nightmares were gaining an audience in Germany as evidenced by Goethe's possession and admiration of paintings by Fuseli capable of "giving the viewer a good fright." Notable artists included Joseph Vernet, Caspar Wolf, Philip James de Loutherbourg, and Henry Fuseli.

== In theatre ==
The Sturm und Drang movement did not last long; according to Betty Waterhouse it began in 1771 and ended in 1778 (Waterhouse v). The rise of the middle class in the 18th century led to a change in the way society and social standings were looked at. Dramatists and writers saw the stage as a venue for critique and discussion of societal issues. French writer Louis-Sébastien Mercier suggested that drama be used to promote political ideas, a concept that would develop many years later. After the Seven Years' War, which ended in 1763, German spirit was extremely high and Germans felt a sense of importance on a grander stage. The aristocracy gained power as the ruling class, furthering the divide and increasing tensions between the classes (Liedner viii). With these new ideals came the sense that a new form of art capable of dethroning the extremely popular French neoclassicism was needed. Johann Georg Hamann, a noted German philosopher and a major promoter of the Sturm und Drang movement, “defended the native culture of the Volk and maintained that language, the root of all our experience, was richer in images and more powerful prior to the ‘abstract’ eighteenth century” (Liedner viii). Germany did not have a common state entity; instead, the nation was broken into hundreds of small states. The Sturm und Drang movement was a reaction to this lack of political unity for the German people and often dealt with the idea of living life on a smaller scale and the desire to become a part of something bigger.

The Sturm und Drang movement also paid a lot of attention to the language of a piece of literature. It is no wonder that Shakespeare, with his brilliant use of language, originality with complex plot lines and subplots, and multifaceted characters from all social classes, was seen as a model for German writers (Wilson and Goldfarb 287). Many writers of the Sturm und Drang movement considered themselves to be challengers of the Enlightenment. However, the movement is actually a continuation of the Enlightenment. Many Sturm und Drang plays showed interest in how society affects the individual, a common theme in many Enlightenment plays as well. However, Sturm und Drang “makes its own distinctive contribution to 18th-century culture, bringing attention to the power of the environment as well as to the contradictory and self-defeating attitudes present in every segment of society” (Liedner ix). Far before its time, the divergent style of Sturm und Drang shrewdly explored depression and violence with an open plot structure (Liedner ix). The Sturm und Drang movement rebelled against all the rules of neoclassicism and the enlightenment, first recognized Shakespeare as a “genius” of dramaturgy, and provided the foundation for 19th-century romanticism. Writers such as Heinrich Leopold Wagner, Goethe, Lenz, Klinger, and Schiller used episodic structure, violence, and mixed genres to comment on societal rules and morals, while doubting that anything would change. The Sturm und Drang movement was brief, but it set a fire that still burns intensely today.

Six main playwrights initiated and popularized the Sturm und Drang movement: Leisewitz, Wagner, Goethe, Lenz, Klinger, and Schiller. The theatre director Abel Seyler, the owner of the Seylersche Schauspiel-Gesellschaft, had an important role in promoting the Sturm und Drang poets.

=== Leisewitz ===
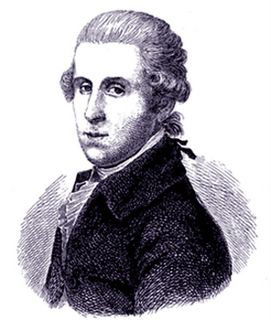
Johann Anton Leisewitz

Johann Anton Leisewitz was born in Hanover in 1752 and studied law. He is remembered for his single complete play, Julius of Taranto (1776), which is considered the forerunner of Schiller's work The Robbers (1781). He was married to Sophie Seyler, the daughter of theatre director Abel Seyler.

=== Wagner ===
Heinrich Leopold Wagner was born in Strasbourg on February 19, 1747. He studied law and was a member of the literary group surrounding Johann Daniel Salzmann. He was a dramatist, producer, translator, and lawyer for the traveling Abel Seyler theatre company. Wagner was best known for his two plays, Die Reue nach der Tat (“The Remorse After the Deed”) in 1775 and Die Kindermorderin (“The Childmurderess”) in 1776. Child murder was a very popular topic in the 18th century and all of the major Sturm und Drang writers used it as a subject in their writings (Waterhouse 97). Die Kindermorderin was one of the most traditional plays of the Sturm und Drang. Although sharing aspects of neoclassical plays, such as a fairly simple plot and very few changes in the setting, it breaks away from the neoclassical idea that the protagonist must be of noble descent. Instead, this play shows how the aristocracy disrupts the lives of middle class characters (Liedner xii). This play also uses a vast array of colorful language to demonstrate the variety of characters and their social statuses. Another common theme seen in Die Kindermorderin is the idea of society hindering change. Groningseck, a lieutenant, seems to be willing to look past social norms and break down walls between the classes, but a fellow officer, Hasenpoth, betrays him (Liedner xii).

=== Goethe ===
Johann Wolfgang von Goethe was born in August 1749, in Frankfurt. He wrote his first important play, Götz von Berlichingen in 1773, in Shakespearean style, a defining characteristic of the Sturm und Drang movement (Wilson and Goldfarb 287). Shakespeare was considered a genius among German playwrights, and was idolized for his “shattering of the dramatic unities of time, place and action; and his sharply individualized, emotionally complex characters” (Waterhouse v). Goethe was well known for his staging as well as his long dramatic poem Faust (Goethe's Faust) (Wilson and Goldfarb 287). Goethe was the director of theatre at the Weimar Theatre where he eventually ran the entire company. He went to Italy for two years to collect himself and while there discovered the beauty of the Greek and Roman ruins. After this trip he returned with interest in classical ideas and writing, and a new form of writing emerged called Weimar Classicism.

=== Lenz ===
Jakob Michael Reinhold Lenz was born in Sesswegen, now Latvia, on the January 23, 1751. He studied theology and philosophy at the University of Königsberg. His first poem, Die Landplagen (“Torments of the Land”), emerged in 1769. He went on to write “Notes on the Theatre”, The New Menoza and Der Hofmeister (“The Tutor”) in 1774, Pandemonium Germanicum in 1775, and Die Soldaten (“The Soldiers”) in 1776 (Liedner xi). Lenz took Aristotle’s popular idea of plot being more important than character and reversed it, as well as reclassified the distinctions between comedy and tragedy. In Lenz’s works, tragedies feature characters that make decisions that cause events, and in comedies a resolute milieu pushes and pulls the character through events (Liedner xi). The Soldiers is most likely Lenz’s most distinct example of Sturm und Drang literature. It centers on an idea of degradation of civilians by soldiers, but more specifically the seduction and abuse of young women by soldiers. Illustrating an undesirable, conflicted character with no power over her situation who does whatever she can to get through her current state, The Soldiers displays a “well-observed world where one’s identity is fluid – and hopelessly entangled in the social and linguistic environment” (Liedner xi). This idea of feeling unable to change one's situation is typical of many Sturm und Drang plays. Lenz's use of reserved dialogue, open form, violence, and a combination of comedy and tragedy precursors the works of contemporary authors such as Friedrich Dürrenmatt and Bertolt Brecht (Waterhouse v).

=== Klinger ===
Friedrich Maximilian Klinger was born in Frankfurt on February 17, 1752. He was born into a humble family and struggled financially after the death of his father. He studied law at Giessen with the financial help of Goethe’s family. He also worked with the Abel Seyler troupe for a year and a half (Pascal 132). Although famous for his Sturm und Drang style plays, many of his earlier plays were very classical in style. Some of Klinger’s works include Die Zwillinge (1776), Die neue Arria (1776), Simsone Grisaldo (1776), and Stilpo und seine Kinder (1780). Klinger’s most famous play, Sturm und Drang (1776), is the seminal piece of literature associated with the Sturm und Drang epoch. Strangely, the play is set in revolutionary America, not Germany. We see allusions to Shakespeare’s Romeo and Juliet through the feuds of the households, as well as All's Well That Ends Well in some of the character’s names (Liedner xiii). Klinger utilized a defining characteristic of Sturm und Drang when he mixed aspects of comedy and tragedy throughout the play, stating “ the deepest tragic emotion continually alternates with laughter and joviality" (Liedner xiii).

=== Schiller ===
Friedrich Schiller was born in Marbach on November 10, 1759. He studied medicine at Karlsschule Stuttgart, a prestigious military academy founded by the Duke of Württemberg. He developed a strong relationship with Goethe, one of the most influential writers of the time (Wilson and Goldfarb 287). They were particularly interested in questions concerning aesthetics. This relationship led to an epoch known as Weimar Classicism, a style that integrates classical, romantic and Enlightenment ideals (Leidner xiv). Following Schiller's plays Die Räuber ("The Robbers") and Kabale und Liebe ("Intrigue and Love"), he went on to become a major poet as well as to write famous essays and Weimar Classical drama (Leidner xiv). Die Räuber tells the story of two brothers, the younger of which is infuriated by how society favors the first-born child and he acts on his feelings without any regard to societal rules or social standing. In act five, his views on God “represent the most blasphemous attack on religion in German literature up to that time… [and] is a masterful work of social dynamics that takes deep German patterns of sensibility into account” (Leidner xiv).

== See also ==
- Antihero
- Jena Romanticism
- Gotthold Ephraim Lessing—his opinions influenced the theatre practitioners who began the movement of Sturm und Drang
