= Friedrich Maximilian von Klinger =

German dramatist and novelist (1752–1831)

Friedrich von Klinger
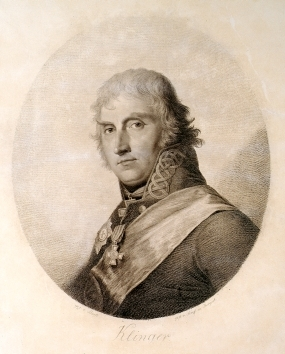
- Klinger, 1807 etching
- Born: Friedrich Maximilian Klinger; 17 February 1752; Free Imperial City of Frankfurt
- Died: 9 March 1831 (aged 79); Dorpat, Russian Empire
- Resting place: Smolenskoye Lutheran Cemetery, St. Petersburg
- Education: University of Gießen
- Occupations: Dramatist, novelist, military officer
- Spouse: Elisabeth Alexeyeva (m. 1788)
- Writing career
- Language: German
- Notable awards: Praeses of the Academy of Knights; Curator of the Imperial University of Dorpat
- Movement: Sturm und Drang

Friedrich Maximilian von Klinger (17 February 1752 – 9 March 1831) was a German dramatist and novelist. His play Sturm und Drang (1776) gave its name to the Sturm und Drang artistic epoch. He was a childhood friend of Johann Wolfgang von Goethe and is often closely associated with Jakob Michael Reinhold Lenz. Klinger worked as a playwright for the Seylersche Schauspiel-Gesellschaft for two years, but eventually left the Kingdom of Prussia to become a General in the Imperial Russian Army.

== Biography ==
One of the few eighteenth-century authors from the lower social class, Klinger was born in Frankfurt am Main. His father, Johannes Klinger (1719–1760), was a town constable in Frankfurt who came from Pfaffen-Beerfurth in the Odenwald where he was born as the son of the mill owner, blacksmith and schoolmaster Johannes Klinger (1671–1743), who was married to Anna Barabra Boßler (1674–1747) since January 17, 1695. His father died when Klinger was eight years old, forcing his mother Cornelia Fuchs Klinger, a sergeant's daughter, to support her son and two daughters by washing laundry from the Frankfurt elite—including, perhaps, Klinger's future friends and patrons, the Goethes of Hirschgrabenallee. In spite of this misfortune, Klinger excelled in his studies and won a scholarship to study at the gymnasium, where he also worked as a tutor to earn money for his family.

Klinger was the cousin of Heinrich Philipp Boßler, who is known as the authorized original publisher of Haydn, Mozart and Beethoven.

Though there is little documentation of Klinger's earliest interactions with Goethe during their Frankfurt years, they appear to have made acquaintance by 1773, as Klinger had begun work on his first dramas, Otto and Das leidende Weib (The Suffering Wife) which, according to his Leipzig publisher, owe a great debt to Goethe's then-unpublished Götz von Berlichingen mit der eisernen Hand. Weygand released the collection at its Easter book fair of 1775, calling them "plays in the Goethean/Lenzian Manner." Additionally, it was only with Goethe's financial assistance that Klinger was able to enroll at the University of Gießen in 1774 where he briefly studied to be a legal clerk.

In 1776, Klinger submitted his tragedy Die Zwillinge (The Twins) to a contest hosted by the Hamburg theatre under the auspices of the actress Sophie Charlotte Ackermann and her son, the famous actor and playwright Friedrich Ludwig Schröder. The play took first prize, earning Klinger enough critical acclaim to be appointed Theaterdichter to the Seylersche Schauspiel-Gesellschaft headed by Abel Seyler and held this post for two years.

In 1778, he joined the Austrian military and fought in the War of the Bavarian Succession. In 1780, he went to Saint Petersburg, became an officer in the Imperial Russian Army, was ennobled and attached to the Grand Duke Paul, whom he accompanied on a journey to Italy and France. In 1785, he was appointed director of the corps of cadets, and after marrying Elizaveta Alekseyeva (rumored to be a natural daughter of Catherine the Great and Prince Grigory Orlov), was made praeses of the Academy of Knights in 1799. In 1803, Klinger was nominated by Emperor Alexander curator of the Imperial University of Dorpat, an office he held until 1817. In 1811, he became lieutenant-general. He then gradually gave up his official posts, and after living for many years in retirement, died in the imperial city of Dorpat in present-day Estonia.

Klinger was a man of vigorous moral character and full of fine feeling, though the bitter experiences and deprivations of his youth are largely reflected in his dramas. It was one of his earliest works, Sturm und Drang (1776), which gave its name to this artistic epoch. In addition to this tragedy and Die Zwillinge (1776), the chief plays of his early period of passionate fervour and restless "storm and stress" are Die neue Arria (1776), Simsone Grisaldo (1776) and Stilpo und seine Kinder (1780). To a later period belongs the fine double tragedy of Medea in Korinth and Medea auf dem Kaukasos (1791). In Russia, he devoted himself mainly to the writing of philosophical romances, of which the best known are Fausts Leben, Taten und Höllenfahrt (1791), Geschichte Giafars des Barmeciden (1792) and Geschichte Raphaeis de Aquillas (1793). This series was closed in 1803 with Betrachtungen und Gedanken über verschiedene Gegenstände der Welt und der Literatur. In these works, Klinger gives calm and dignified expression to the leading ideas which the period of Sturm und Drang had bequeathed to German classical literature.

== Works ==
- Faustus
- Review of Klinger's Faust 1890
- Sturm und Drang

== Bibliography ==
Klingers works were published in twelve volumes (1809–1815), also 1832–1833 and 1842. The most recent edition is in eight volumes (1878–1880); but none of these is complete. A selection will be found in A. Sauer, Stürmer und Dränger, vol. 1. (1883). See E. Schmidt, Lenz und Klinger (1878); M. Rieger, Klinger in der Sturm-und Drangperiode (1880); and Klinger in seiner Reife (1896).
