= Jagdschloss Kranichstein =

Hunting lodge, a palace, now museum and hotel, in Darmstadt, Germany

Coordinates: 49°54′1″N 8°41′51″E

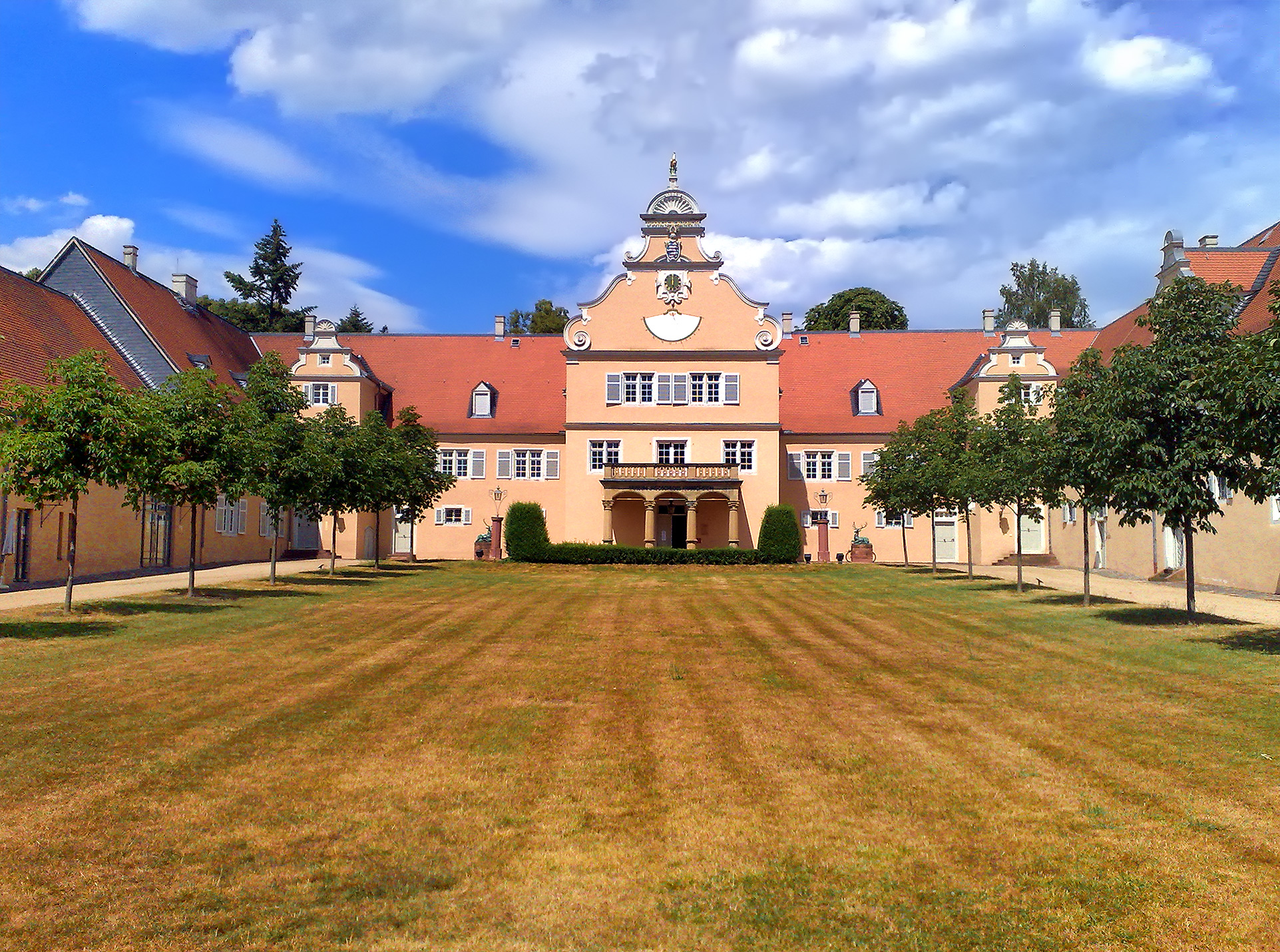
- Main building
- Interactive map of the Jagdschloss Kranichstein area
- Alternative names: Schloss Kranichstein; Kranichstein Hunting Lodge

General information
- Status: Museum, Hotel
- Location: Darmstadt, Hesse, Germany
- Construction started: 1578

Design and construction
- Architect: Jakob Kesselhuth

Jagdschloss Kranichstein is a palace in Kranichstein, now part of Darmstadt, Hesse, Germany. It was built north of Darmstadt from 1578 as a Jagdschloss, a hunting lodge for George I, Landgrave of Hesse-Darmstadt. It served also as a summer residence. In 1917, it became a museum of hunting. From 1946, it was the first location of the Darmstädter Ferienkurse.

The estate is one of few remaining Baroque hunting lodges in Germany, referred to also as Kranichstein Hunting Lodge. It serves as a hunting museum, and as a hotel with restaurant and event location including for weddings.

== History ==
Jagdschloss Kranichstein was built on a commission from George I, Landgrave of Hesse-Darmstadt by his master builder Jakob Kesselhuth as a palace with three wings. Transformation of a former agricultural estate to a courtly palace began in 1578 and was completed in 1580. His successors, Ernest Louis and Louis VIII, held events such as Parforcejagd, expanding the buildings towards more representation and elegance. The estate was used for hunting by the landgraves for more than 350 years.

From 1863, Louis IV, the later Grand Duke of Hesse, and his wife Alice, a daughter of Queen Victoria, used the property temporarily as their residence, and in the following years as their summer residence. Queen Victoria visited the palace as a summer guest several times.

The estate became a museum in 1917, when Ernest Louis collected all hunting weapons from his palaces and hunting lodges at this location. It was installed by Kuno von Hardenberg.

It became the venue of the Darmstädter Ferienkurse, courses for contemporary music from 1946. In 1952, the Stiftung Hessischer Jägerhof foundation acquired the estate. In the same year, the museum was reopened, with a focus on the Baroque period. The palace was restored from 1988 to 1996 by the state, Darmstadt and the foundation, restoring the Renaissance version of the first floor. The estate has been used as a hotel, with a wedding venue from the end of the 20th century. In 2008, the museum bioversum in the Jagdzeughaus was opened. It deals with biodiversity and invasive species.

== Literature ==
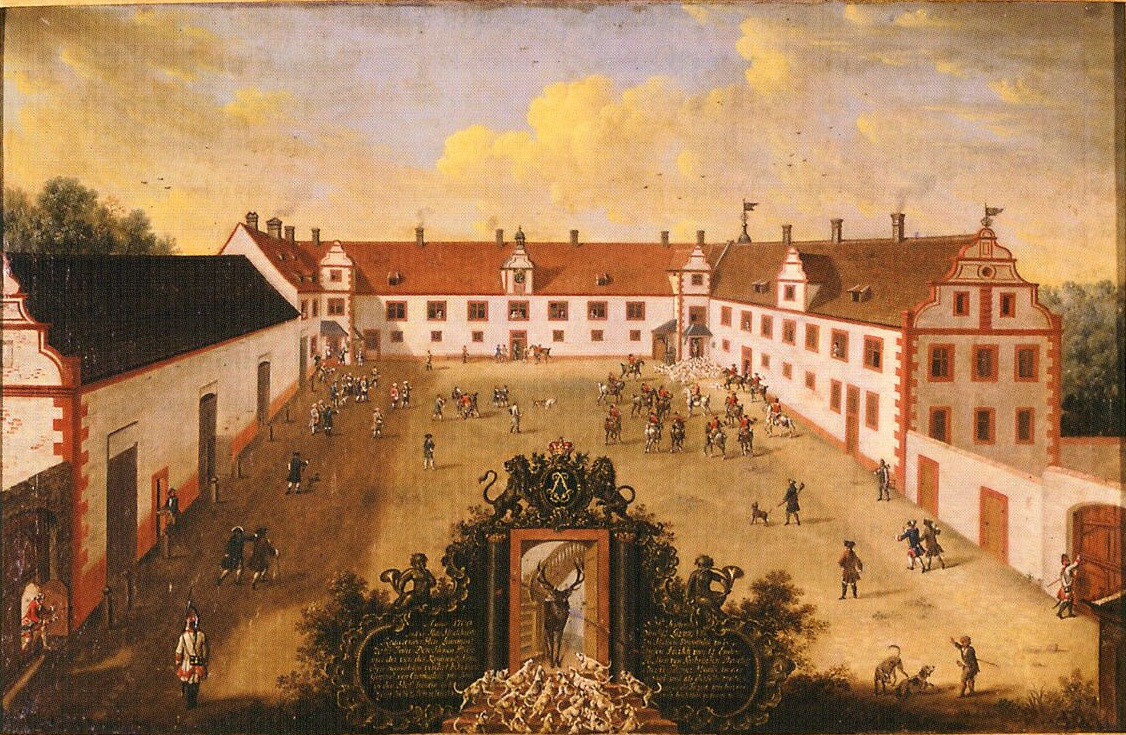
Kranichstein in 1760, painting by Georg Adam Eger

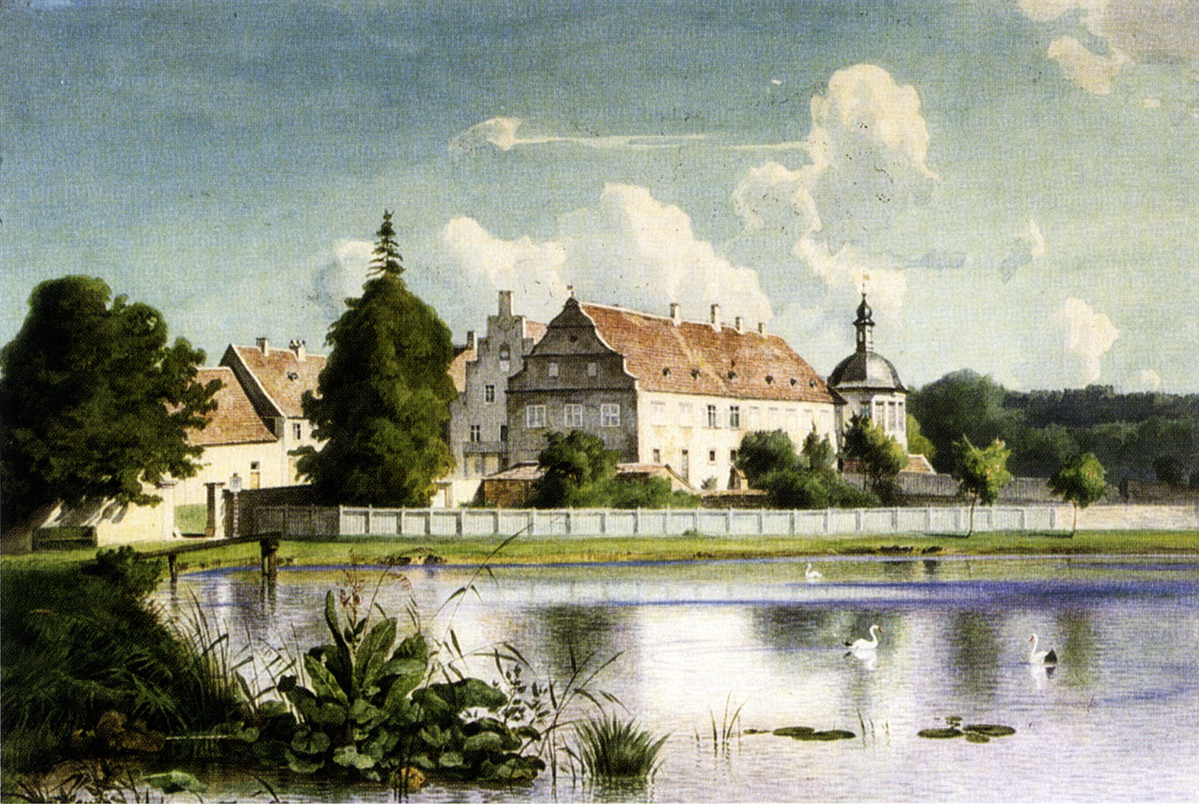
Kranichstein in 1852, painting by Carl Schweich

- Peter Engels: 600 Jahre Kranichstein, in: Sechste Sommerspiele Jagdschloß Kranichstein, Darmstadt 1999
- Kuno Graf von Hardenberg: Das Jagdschloß Kranichstein und die Jagdmaler des Landgräflichen Hofes zu Darmstadt, Darmstadt 1918
- Eberhard Lohmann: Landgraf Georg I. und die Anfänge von Schloß Kranichstein, Darmstadt 2002
- Iris Reepen: Museum Jagdschloss Kranichstein, Deutscher Kunstverlag München/Berlin 2002 ISBN 3-422-06351-X
- H. Retzlaff: Kranichstein. Renaissanceschloß und Jagdmuseum bei Darmstadt, Darmstadt 1961
- Gisela Siebert: Jagdhäuser der Landgrafen von Hessen-Darmstadt auf Bildern des 18. und 19. Jahrhunderts, Darmstadt 2001
- Wolfgang Weitz: Jagdwaffen aus dem Jagdmuseum Schloß Kranichstein, in: Museumsblätter Niddaer Heimatmuseum, Nidda 1990
- Bettina Clausmeyer-Ewers: Wildpark und Schlossgarten Kranichstein, Deutscher Kunstverlag (DKV), 2006
