= Symphony No. 45 (Haydn) =

Symphony by Joseph Haydn

- Farewell
- by Joseph Haydn
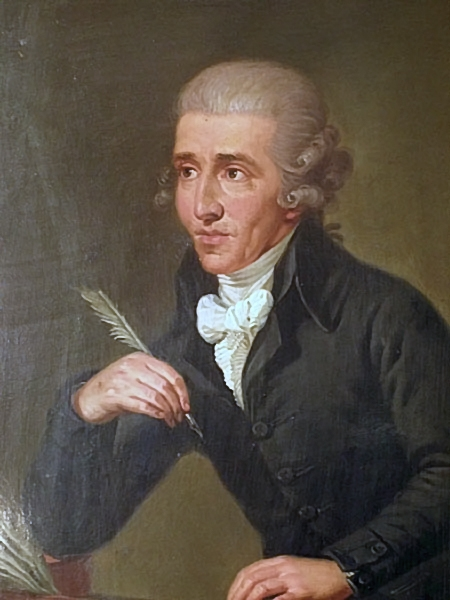
- Portrait of Joseph Haydn, ca. 1770
- Key: F# minor
- Catalogue: Hob. I:45
- Composed: 1772
- Duration: About 25 minutes
- Movements: 4
- Scoring: Orchestra

Joseph Haydn's Symphony No. 45 in F♯ minor, known as the "Farewell" Symphony (German: Abschieds-Symphonie; modern orthography: Abschiedssinfonie), is a symphony dated 1772 on the autograph score. A typical performance of the symphony lasts around twenty-five minutes.

The autograph manuscript of the symphony is preserved in the National Széchényi Library in Budapest, and was published in facsimile editions in 1959 (Akadémiai Kiadó) and 2010 (Laaber-Verlag).

== History ==
The tale of how the symphony was composed was told by Haydn in old age to his biographers Albert Christoph Dies and Georg August Griesinger.

At that time, Haydn's patron Nikolaus I, Prince Esterházy was resident, together with all his musicians and retinue, at his favorite summer palace at Eszterháza in rural Hungary. The stay there had been longer than expected, and most of the musicians had been forced to leave their wives back at home in Eisenstadt, about a day's journey away. Longing to return, the musicians appealed to their Kapellmeister for help. The diplomatic Haydn, instead of making a direct appeal, put his request into the music of the symphony: during the final adagio each musician stops playing, snuffs out the candle on his music stand, and leaves in turn, so that at the end, there are just two muted violins left (played by Haydn himself and his concertmaster, Luigi Tomasini). Esterházy seems to have understood the message: the court returned to Eisenstadt the day following the performance.

== The music ==
=== Key ===
The work is in F♯ minor. According to James Webster, this choice was unusual; indeed the Farewell Symphony is apparently the only known 18th-century symphony ever written in this key.

The symphony could not be performed without the purchase of some special equipment: on 22 October 1772 Haydn signed an order (preserved in the scrupulously maintained Esterházy archives) for two special half-step slides (German: Halbthönige Krummbögen) for use by the horn players. These slightly lengthened the horn's tubing, permitting the instrument to be used to play in keys a semitone lower than usual. The horn of the time was the valveless natural horn, which needed to be adjusted with inserted crooks to play in different keys. Haydn's purchase order is part of the evidence that the symphony was completed in the fall of 1772.

=== Movements ===
The piece is written for two oboes, bassoon, two horns (in A, F♯ and E), and strings (violins in two sections (four in the final Adagio), violas, cellos and double basses).

1. Allegro assai, 3/4
2. Adagio, 3/8 in A major
3. Menuet e Trio: Allegretto, 3/4 in F♯ major
4. Finale: Presto – Adagio, 2/2 in F♯ minor and then 3/8 in A major-F♯ major

The turbulent first movement of the work opens in a manner typical of Haydn's Sturm und Drang period, with descending minor arpeggios in the first violins against syncopated notes in the second violins and held chords in the winds. The movement can be explained structurally in terms of sonata form, but it departs from the standard model in a number of ways (just before the recapitulation, for example, new material is introduced, which might have been used as the second subject in the exposition in a more conventional work). Also, the exposition moves to C♯ minor, the dominant minor, rather than the more usual relative major.

The second, slow, movement in A major and 3/8 time is also in sonata form. It begins with a relaxed melody played by muted violins, featuring a repeated "hiccuping" motif. The mood gradually becomes more somber and meditative with an alternation between major and minor modes, resembling many similar passages in the later work of Schubert. There follows a series of dissonant suspensions carried across the bar line, which are extended to extraordinary lengths by Haydn when the same material appears in the recapitulation. James Webster hears this music as programmatic, expressing the yearning for home.

The following minuet is in the key of F♯ major; its main peculiarity is that the final cadence of each section is made very weak (falling on the third beat), creating a sense of incompleteness.

The last movement begins as a characteristic Haydn finale in fast tempo and cut time, written in sonata form in the home key of F♯ minor. The rhythmic intensity is increased at one point through the use of unison bariolage in the first violin part. The music eventually reaches the end of the recapitulation in a passage that sounds very much as if it were the end of the symphony but suddenly breaks off in a dominant cadence.

What follows is a long coda-like section, in essence a second slow movement, which is highly unusual in Classical symphonies and was probably quite surprising to the Prince. (It is in this section of the last movement where the musicians stop playing, snuff out their candles, and leave in turn.). This is written in 3/8 time, modulates from A major to F♯ major (pivoting between the two with C♯ minor/major), and includes a bit of stage business that may not be obvious to a listener hearing a recorded performance: several of the musicians are given little solos to play, after which they snuff out the candle on their music stand and take their leave; other musicians leave without solos. The order of departure is: first oboe and second horn (solos), bassoon (no solo), second oboe and first horn (solos), double bass (solo), cello (no solo), orchestral violins (solos; first chair players silent), viola (no solo). As the number of remaining instruments dwindles, the sound emanating from the orchestra gradually becomes audibly thinner. The first chair violinists remain to complete the work. The ending is a kind of deliberate anticlimax and is usually performed as a very soft pianissimo.

== Reception ==
The work is probably one of the more familiar and frequently performed of the symphonies from the earlier period of Haydn's career. Haydn himself quoted the opening of the first movement in his Symphony No. 85, suggesting he knew that his audience would recognize it. For the musicologist James Webster, the work deserves its fame not so much for its affiliated anecdote but rather in its own right as superlative music, and he devoted to it a substantial book (Webster 1991) analyzing it in great detail and placing it in its musicological context.

== See also ==
- List of symphonies with names
- "The Last Song" by X Japan, which references the symphony by having the performers leave one-by-one.
- "Take Five" by Dave Brubeck Quartet, which often ended with the band members leaving in similar fashion.

== Notes ==
=== Sources ===
- Gotwals, Vernon (1961) Haydn: Two Contemporary Portraits. Milwaukee: University of Wisconsin Press. Contains the translated text of both Dies and Griesinger's early biographies.
- Webster, James (1991) Haydn's "Farewell" Symphony and the Idea of Classical Style. Cambridge: Cambridge University Press. ISBN 0-521-38520-2.
- Rice, John, "The Farewell Symphony between Paris and Russia," Haydn: Online Journal of the Haydn Society of North America 3.2 (Fall, 2013)
