= Three German Dances =

Songs by Wolfgang Amadeus Mozart

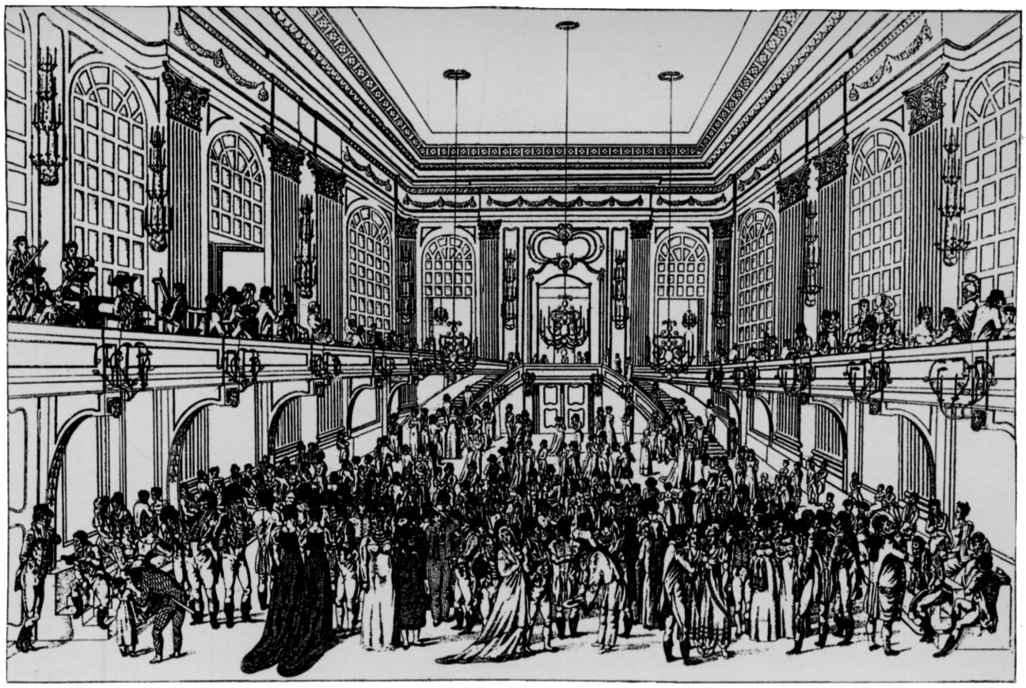
The Grosse Redoutensaal (Grand Ballroom) of the Hofburg Imperial Palace in Vienna; this is where the Three German Dances were intended to have been performed.

Three German Dances, K. 605, is a set of three dance pieces composed by Wolfgang Amadeus Mozart in February of 1791 in Vienna.

== History and the other German Dances ==
Most of Mozart's German Dances were written whilst he held the position of Kammermusicus (Imperial Chamber Composer) in Vienna. Mozart had been appointed to this position on 1 December 1787 by Emperor Joseph II. The position was offered following the death of the former Kammermusicus, Christoph Willibald Gluck on 15 November 1787. In the position Mozart earned 800 florins a year. One of the main obligations of his position was to write music for the court dances and balls that were held in the Redoutensaal (Public Ballrooms) of the Imperial Palace in Vienna.

Mozart was an enthusiastic dancer and produced many dance works, including ten sets of German dances. The first set was written in February 1787, before Mozart's appointment to Kammermusicus. The other sets, excluding K. 611, were written between December 1787 and 1791, during which Mozart also wrote well-known pieces such as Symphonies 40 and 41, and his opera Così fan tutte. These were mostly written in sets of six, with one set of four and one of twelve. Mozart composed this set of three Teutsche (German Dances) in the early months of 1791. The three dances of K. 605 are usually listed with the six dances of K. 600 and the four of K. 602 as Dreizehn deutsche Tänze (Thirteen German Dances). The pieces first appear on 12 February 1791 on Mozart's List of all my Works, and are the penultimate set of German Dances that Mozart composed before his death on 5 December 1791.

== Music ==
=== Instrumentation ===
The dances are scored for piccolo, two flutes, two oboes, two bassoons, two horns, two trumpets, timpani, violins I and II, violoncellos, and double basses. The middle section and coda, titled Die Schlittenfahrt (The sleigh ride), of the third dance adds two posthorns and five sleigh bells tuned to C, E, F, G, and A (in ascending order).

=== Description ===
As the name "Three German Dances" suggests, this set of dances includes three individual dances. Each dance changes in instrumentation; only the violins play in all three dances. Each dance varies in character because of this, and each includes various features:

- Dance 1: The first dance begins with a series of repeating phrases that have a rich texture and are emphasised by the violins. Small, light fanfares can be heard throughout the piece being played by the trumpets. At the end of the dance the main theme from the beginning of the dance is repeated in a characterful ending.
- Dance 2: The main tune is once again played by the violins at the beginning, and this main tune is repeated, as is the next phrase. However, this repeat is played at a lower dynamic. The main tune then passes on to a characterful woodwind section. This is followed by an almost waltz-like phrase which has a clear, steady beat that could have easily been danced to.
- Dance 3 Schlittenfahrt: This dance may have been written independently of the others, as it is very different in style. Schlittenfahrt means "Sleigh Ride"; the use of sleigh bells in the piece clearly emphasises this. Before the sleigh bells enter, there is a series of repeating phrases that pass between the trumpets, woodwind and violins. The topography of the dynamics of the tuned sleigh bells make the piece seem like a sleigh ride, as the dynamics rise and fall like a sleigh would over snow. This is followed by a simple posthorn solo that gives a very peaceful and clear atmosphere to the piece, like a winter's day. The original repeating phrases then return, but end with a majestic fanfare from the trumpets that passes to the other instruments, then returns to the sleigh bells and posthorn solo again. The piece ends with a diminuendo of the posthorn solo.

== Recordings ==
Orchestra	Conductor	Record label	Recording date
Boston Pops Orchestra	Arthur Fiedler	RCA Victor	1959
Berlin Philharmonic	Herbert von Karajan	EMI	1961
Wiener Mozart-Ensemble	Willi Boskovsky	Decca	1966
Academy of St. Martin-in-the-Fields	Sir Neville Marriner	Philips Digital Classics	1981
Philharmonia Orchestra	Sir Charles Groves	Denon	1988
Cappella Istropolitana	Johannes Wildner	Naxos	1989
Orpheus Chamber Orchestra	n/a	Deutsche Grammophon	1997
Ulm Philharmonic	James Allen Gähres	SCM	1998
Slovak Sinfonietta	Taras Krysa	Brilliant Classics	2002
Orchestra of Saint John's	John Lubbock	Resonance	2006

== See also ==
- Mozart and dance
- German Dance
