= Op. 128 =

In music, Op. 128 stands for Opus number 128. Compositions that are assigned this number include:

- Reger – Vier Tondichtungen nach A. Böcklin
- Saint-Saëns – The Assassination of the Duke of Guise
- Schumann – Julius Caesar
