= Egmont (play) =

Play by Johann Wolfgang von Goethe, published in 1788

Egmont is a drama by Johann Wolfgang von Goethe, which he completed in 1788. Its dramaturgical structure, like that of his earlier Sturm und Drang play Götz von Berlichingen (1773), is heavily influenced by Shakespearean tragedy. In contrast to the earlier work, the portrait in Egmont of the downfall of a man who trusts in the goodness of those around him appears to mark a shift away from Sturm und Drang themes. The play was set to music by Beethoven in 1810.

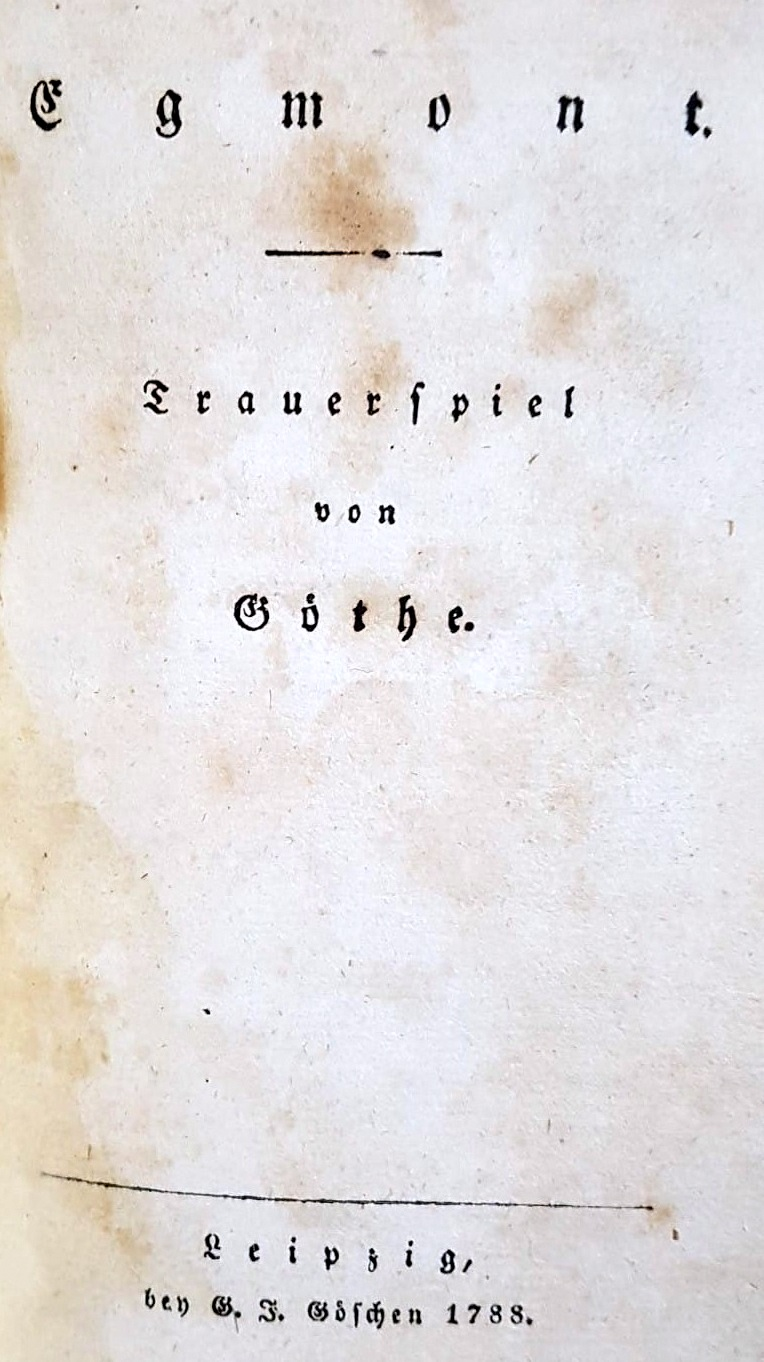
The title page of the first edition of Geothe's Egmont, 1788

== Publication ==
The first edition was published in Leipzig, by Georg Joachim Göschen in 1788. Further editions were published in Leipzig in 1788, 1789, 1790, 1803 and at regular intervals thereafter. The play was translated into French in 1822, and into English by Anna Swanwick in 1850, published in Bohn's Standard Library.

== Plot ==
In Egmont, Goethe relates the fight of Count Egmont (1522–1568) in the Eighty Years' War against the despotic Duke of Alba. Egmont is a famous Dutch warrior and the Duke of Alba represents the Spanish invader. Though under threat of arrest, Egmont refuses to run away and give up his ideal of liberty. Imprisoned and abandoned because of the cowardice of his people, and despite the desperate efforts of his mistress Klärchen, he is sentenced to death.

Thus, faced with her failure and despair, Klärchen puts an end to her life. The play ends on the hero's last call to fight for independence. His death as a martyr appears as a victory against oppression.

Egmont is a political manifesto in which Egmont's craving for justice and national liberty is opposed to the despotic authority of the Duke of Alba. It is also a drama of destiny in which the Flemish nobleman, with fatalism, accepts the dire consequences of his straightforwardness and honesty.

== Quotation ==
The phrase "Himmelhoch jauchzend, zu(m) Tode betrübt" (heavenly joy, deadly sorrow) from Klärchen's song in the third act has become a proverb often quoted by European intellectuals as characteristic of the Romantic soul:

Freudvoll und leidvoll, gedankenvoll sein;
Langen und bangen in schwebender Pein;
Himmelhoch jauchzend, zum Tode betrübt;
Glücklich allein ist die Seele, die liebt.

In joy and in sorrow, be thoughtful;
Long and fearful in suspended pain;
Rejoicing to heaven, grieving to death;
Blessed alone is the soul that loves.

== Music ==
When in 1809 the Burgtheater asked Ludwig van Beethoven, a great admirer of Goethe, to compose incidental music for a revival of the play, he accepted with enthusiasm. It recalled themes close to his own political preoccupations, already expressed in his opera Leonore (renamed Fidelio in the definitive 1814 version) and in his Coriolan Overture (in 1807). Besides the Overture, he wrote nine pieces of incidental music, culminating with the beautiful Klärchen's Death. Though the other pieces in the incidental music are seldom played, Beethoven's overture to Egmont is a staple of the concert repertoire. It has been used in various modern-day cultural output, a famous United Nations film being one of them. The overture was played at the memorial service commemorating the kidnapping and murders of 11 Israeli athletes at the 1972 Summer Olympics.

== Cultural influences ==
The Short Film Palme d'Or-winning Hungarian film Overture by János Vadász uses Beethoven's Egmont Overture as the soundtrack for a series of images, featuring a hatching bird, referencing the rebellious nature of Egmont fighting for freedom despite all barriers. The film, nominated for the Academy Award for Best Documentary (Short Subject) has been described as one of the most influential short films in film history. The reviewer said it was "among the most ingenious pairings of music and image in the history of the festival."
