= Julius Caesar (overture) =

Concert overture by Robert Schumann

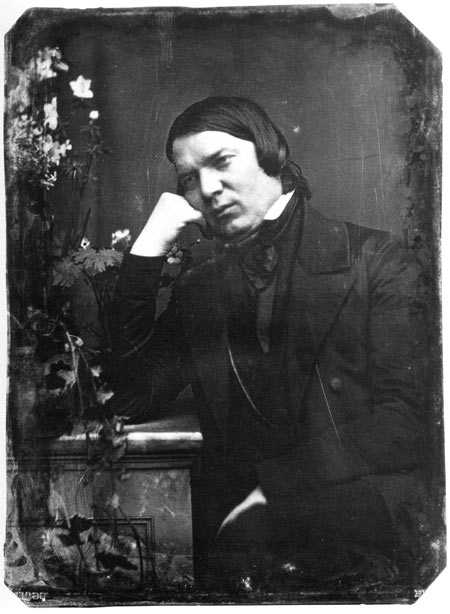
Robert Schumann in an 1850 daguerreotype

The Julius Caesar overture, Op. 128, is a concert overture written in 1851 by Robert Schumann, inspired by Shakespeare's play Julius Caesar and influenced by the Egmont and Coriolan overtures of Ludwig van Beethoven.

== Background ==
Julius Caesar is usually associated with two other Schumann concert overtures written about that time, also inspired by great literature: The Bride of Messina, Op. 100 (based on Schiller's eponymous play) and Hermann und Dorothea, Op. 136 (based on Goethe's epic poem). The year 1851 was intensely active for Schumann: not only did he complete these three overtures, he also wrote his Piano Trio No. 3, his 1st and 2nd violin sonatas, a chamber oratorio, lieder, works for chorus and orchestra, and works for solo piano; and thoroughly revised his Symphony No. 4.

== Composition ==
The Julius Caesar overture is in the key of F minor and is scored for piccolo, flute, 2 oboes, 2 clarinets, 2 bassoons, 4 horns, 2 trumpets, 3 trombones, timpani and strings. The gloomy, brooding nature of the overture has often been noted: A darkly hued work, imbued with a spirit of tragic grandeur from start to finish; a brooding introduction to Shakespeare's play, full of oppressive, militaristic flourishes and hinting at some violent threat that never fully manifests itself.

== Influences ==
It was not intended to portray the historical person of Julius Caesar, but was inspired by William Shakespeare's eponymous play. In his sketches for the work, beneath the staves on the first page Schumann wrote down what he considered the central "plot points" of the play: "Caesar / Life in Rome. Brutus. / Conspiracy. Calpurnia. The Ides. Death. Philippi. / Octavian's revenge. Victory over Brutus".

It also drew inspiration from two overtures of Ludwig van Beethoven: that to his incidental music to Egmont, with which it shares the key of F minor, the "uncompromising sonata form", and the coda in the major key; and to a lesser extent his concert overture Coriolan.

== Creation ==
Schumann started writing the music in mid-January 1851. His wife Clara noted in her diary on 17 January that he was now working on the overture. He wrote out the full score between 27 January and 2 February, finishing it only a few days before he conducted the premiere of his 3rd Symphony, "Rhenish" (6 February).

== First performances and Schumann's health ==
The work had its premiere on 3 August 1852 in Düsseldorf. Earlier that year he had consulted Dr Wolfgang Müller about his physical ailments. Müller was also a director of the Düsseldorf Music Society, of which Schumann was Music Director and chief conductor, and advised him to do less conducting and hand some of the work to his deputy Julius Tausch. On 8 July Schumann commenced a series of 18 cold baths in the Rhine under Müller's instruction. This resulted in some improvement in his condition. On 30 July, against Müller's advice, he attended the first rehearsal of the Julius Caesar overture under Tausch, but became agitated and took over the conducting of the work himself. At the concert on 3 August, once again without warning, he took personal command of the orchestra and conducted the premiere of the work himself; he also went on to "tactlessly" conduct a Beethoven overture that Tausch had rehearsed but Schumann had not. The Julius Caesar Overture produced little noticeable effect on the audience. The result for Schumann was exhaustion, and Müller recommended he have more intensive treatment, and sent him for sea baths at Scheveningen, Netherlands. This was the beginning of the insanity that marked his last years.

== Possible cryptogram ==
Schumann was known to be interested in musical cryptograms, best demonstrated in his piano suite Carnaval, Op. 9. Eric Sams suggests there are many other clues throughout Schumann's works, including a cipher for "C-A-E-S-A-R" in the opening chords of the Julius Caesar overture.

== Legacy ==
The work has been recorded a number of times, but is not often performed in concert.
