= Symphony No. 40 (Mozart) =

1788 symphony by W. A. Mozart

- by W. A. Mozart
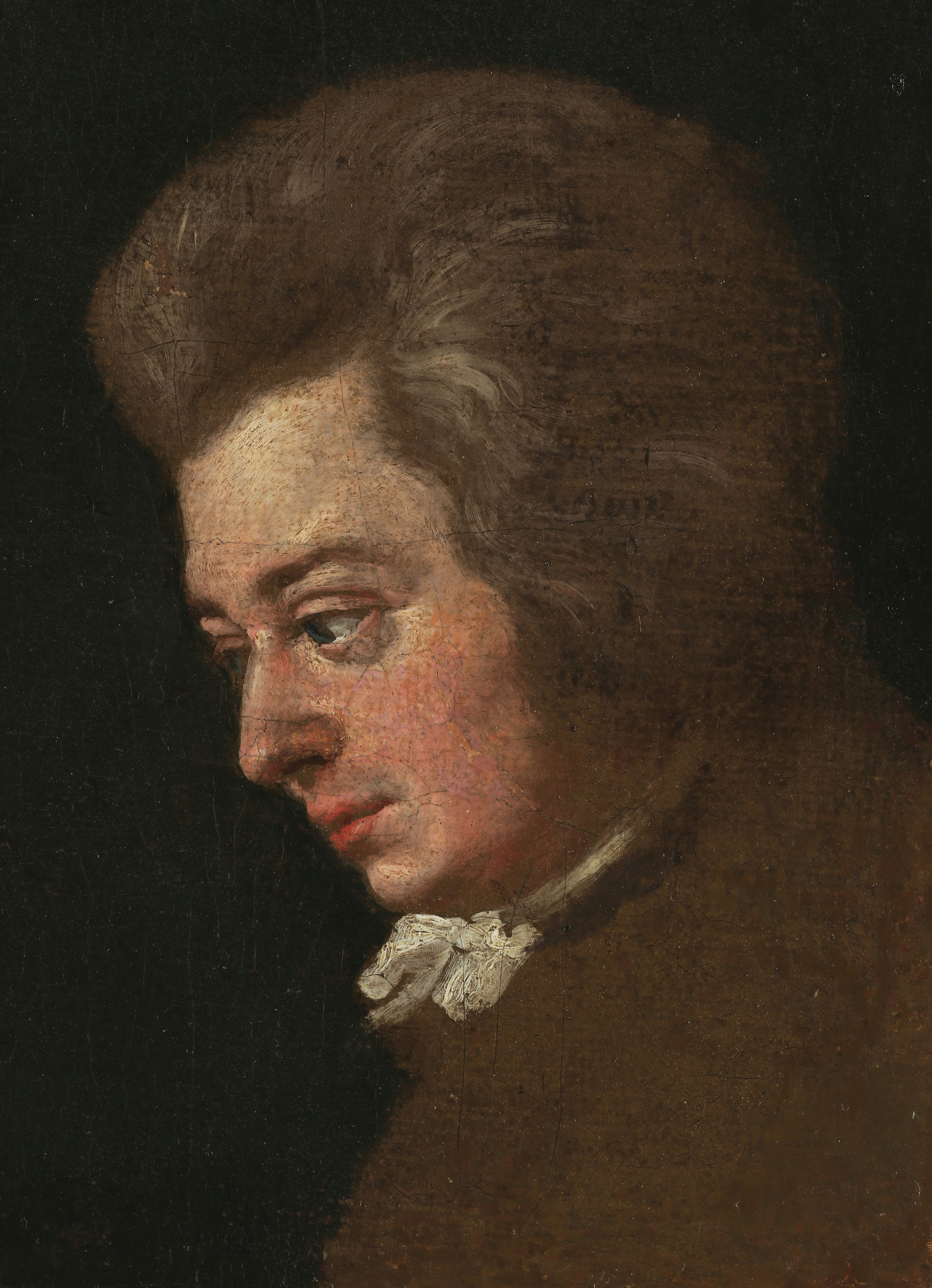
- Mozart c. 1783
- Other name: Great G minor symphony
- Key: G minor
- Catalogue: K. 550
- Composed: 1788
- Duration: c. 26 minutes
- Movements: 4
- Scoring: Orchestra

Wolfgang Amadeus Mozart composed his Symphony No. 40 in G minor, K. 550, in 1788. It is one of his most celebrated and widely performed works.

== History ==
=== Composition ===
Mozart had already written a G minor symphony as a precocious seventeen-year-old, following the then-current trend of Sturm und Drang in music. That was his 25th symphony; it is sometimes called the "Little G minor symphony" to distinguish it from the mature work discussed here, which can also be called the "Great G minor symphony." The two are the only extant minor key among Mozart's symphonies. (Note: A possible exception is the so-called "Odense Symphony", whose attribution to Mozart is doubtful; see Mozart symphonies of spurious or doubtful authenticity.)

The date of completion of the 40th Symphony is known exactly, since Mozart in his mature years kept a full catalog of his completed works; he entered the 40th Symphony into it on 25 July 1788. Work on the symphony occupied an exceptionally productive period of just a few weeks during which time he also completed the 39th and 41st symphonies (26 June and 10 August, respectively). Nikolaus Harnoncourt conjectured that Mozart composed the three symphonies as a unified work, pointing, among other things, to the fact that the Symphony No. 40, as the middle work, has no introduction (unlike No. 39) and does not have a finale of the scale of No. 41's.

The 40th symphony exists in two versions, differing primarily in that one includes parts for a pair of clarinets (with suitable adjustments made in the other wind parts). Most likely, the clarinet parts were added in a revised version. The autograph scores of both versions were acquired in the 1860s by Johannes Brahms, who later donated the manuscripts to the Gesellschaft der Musikfreunde in Vienna, where they reside today.

=== Premiere ===
As Neal Zaslaw has pointed out, writers on Mozart have often suggested – or even asserted – that Mozart never heard his 40th Symphony performed. Some commentators go further, suggesting that Mozart wrote the symphony (and its companions, Nos. 39 and 41) without even intending it to be performed, but rather for posterity, as (to use Alfred Einstein's words) an "appeal to eternity". (Note: For discussion of claims of this sort, see Zaslaw 1994; the quotation from Einstein is taken from this source.)

Modern scholarship suggests that these conjectures are not correct. First, in a recently discovered 10 July 1802 letter by the musician Johann Wenzel (1762–1831) to the publisher Ambrosius Kühnel in Leipzig, Wenzel refers to a performance of the symphony at the home of Baron Gottfried van Swieten with Mozart present, but the execution was so poor that the composer had to leave the room. (Note: The letter reads "im Wien habe ich selbst es von verstorbenem Mozart gehört, als Er sie bei Baron Wanswiten [sic] hat produciren lassen, das[s] er wärend der production aus dem Zimmer sich hat entfernen müssen, wie man Sie unrichtig aufgeführt hat", meaning "and in Vienna I have heard myself from the departed Mozart, that when he had it performed in Baron Wanswiten's rooms, he had to leave the room during the performance because it was being played incorrectly.")

There is strong circumstantial evidence for other, probably better, performances. On several occasions between the composition of the symphony and the composer's death, symphony concerts were given featuring Mozart's music for which copies of the program have survived, announcing a symphony unidentified by date or key. These include

- Dresden, 14 April 1789, during Mozart's Berlin journey,
- Leipzig, 12 May 1789, on the same trip,
- Frankfurt, 15 October 1790, and
- (as a poster) a concert given by the Tonkünstler-Societät (Society of Musicians) 17 April 1791 in the Burgtheater in Vienna, conducted by Mozart's colleague Antonio Salieri. The first item on the program was billed as "A Grand Symphony composed by Herr Mozart". (Note: The text of the poster is given in Deutsch 1965, p. 393.)

Most important is the fact that Mozart revised his symphony (see above). As Zaslaw says, this "demonstrates that [the symphony] was performed, for Mozart would hardly have gone to the trouble of adding the clarinets and rewriting the flutes and oboes to accommodate them, had he not had a specific performance in view." The orchestra for the 1791 Vienna concert included the clarinetist brothers Anton and Johann Nepomuk Stadler; which, as Zaslaw points out, limits the possibilities to just the 39th and 40th symphonies.

Zaslaw adds: "The version without clarinets must also have been performed, for the reorchestrated version of two passages in the slow movement, which exists in Mozart's hand, must have resulted from his having heard the work and discovered an aspect needing improvement." (Note: Though quoted heavily above, Zaslaw is not alone in denigrating the old view that the symphony was never performed: Otto Biba 2009 writes, "Since there is no known date of a premiere performance, there developed the long standing legend among Mozart biographers of a romantic persuasion, who wished to portray primarily the brilliance and tragedy of a genius' life, that Mozart never heard performances of [his last] three symphonies. This arrogant assumption, which equates missing information with the theory that the event never happened, is not serious scholarship and must be rejected.")

Regarding the concerts for which the Symphony was originally intended when it was composed in 1788, Otto Erich Deutsch suggests that Mozart was preparing to hold a series of three "Concerts in the Casino", in a new casino in the Spiegelgasse owned by Philipp Otto. Mozart even sent a pair of tickets for this series to his friend Michael Puchberg. But it seems impossible to determine whether the concert series was held, or was cancelled for lack of interest.

== Music ==
I. Molto allegro

II. Andante

III. Menuetto. Allegretto – Trio

IV. Finale. Allegro assai
Fulda Symphonic Orchestra, Simon Schindler conducting

The symphony is scored for flute, 2 oboes, 2 clarinets (in the 2nd version of 1791), 2 bassoons, 2 horns, and strings.

The work is in four movements, in the usual arrangement for a classical-style symphony (fast movement, slow movement, minuet, fast movement):

1. Molto allegro, 2/2
2. Andante, 6/8
3. Menuetto. Allegretto – Trio, 3/4
4. Finale. Allegro assai, 2/2

=== I. Molto allegro ===
The first movement begins darkly, not with its first theme but with the accompaniment, played by the lower strings with divided violas. The technique of beginning a work with an accompaniment figure was later used by Mozart in his last piano concerto (KV. 595) and later became a favorite of the Romantics (examples include the openings of Mendelssohn's Violin Concerto and Sergei Rachmaninoff's Third Piano Concerto). The first theme is as follows.

=== II. Andante ===
The second movement is a lyrical work in 6/8 time. It is in the subdominant key of the relative major of G minor (B♭ major): E♭ major. The contrapuntal opening bars of this movement appear thus in keyboard reduction:

=== III. Menuetto. Allegretto – Trio ===
The minuet begins with an angry, cross-accented hemiola rhythm and a pair of three-bar phrases, as shown in the following piano reduction:

The severe character of the minuet stands in contrast to the form's traditional use as dance music, a genre frequently used by Mozart. The contrasting gentle trio section, in G major, alternates the playing of the string section with that of the winds.

=== IV. Finale. Allegro assai ===
Simon P. Keefe points out that, unlike Mozart's other works in G minor, in which the last movement is lighter in character, "Mozart’s unremittingly intense finale continues in the minor right up until the final chord". The fourth movement opens with a series of rapidly ascending notes outlining the tonic triad illustrating what is commonly referred to as the Mannheim rocket.

Zaslaw and Cowdery express their admiration of this movement thus: "[a] brilliant Finale, which takes bourrée rhythm, attaches it to a Mannheim "rocket" ... and turns the unlikely mixture into a propulsive sonata form movement of enormous proportions".

A remarkable modulating passage in which every tone in the chromatic scale but one is played, strongly destabilizing the key, occurs at the beginning of the development section; the single note left out is G (the tonic):

== Legacy ==
=== Reception ===
This work has elicited varying interpretations from critics. Robert Schumann regarded it as possessing "Grecian lightness and grace". Donald Tovey saw in it the character of opera buffa. It is perhaps a more common perception today that the symphony is tragic in tone and intensely emotional; for example, in The Classical Style, Charles Rosen calls the symphony "a work of passion, violence, and grief".

Although interpretations differ, the symphony is unquestionably one of Mozart's most greatly admired works, and it is frequently performed and recorded.

=== Influence ===
Zaslaw and Cowdery write, "... the G minor Symphony is a key work in understanding the link between musical Classicism and musical Romanticism ..." During the 19th century, as interest in 18th century music declined, the impassioned character of the 40th Symphony kept it steadily in the symphonic repertoire. The high esteem in which it was held can be judged by references to it in the Allgemeine musikalische Zeitung, which praised it as "a true masterpiece" (in 1804), "Mozart's symphony of all symphonies" (1809) and a "classical masterwork" (1813).

Ludwig van Beethoven knew the symphony well, copying out 29 bars from the score in one of his sketchbooks. As Gustav Nottebohm observed in 1887, the copied bars appear amid the sketches for Beethoven's Fifth Symphony, whose third movement begins with a pitch sequence similar to that of Mozart's finale (see example above).

Franz Schubert likewise copied out the music of Mozart's minuet, and the minuet of his Fifth Symphony strongly evokes Mozart's. Zaslaw has suggested that a passage late in Joseph Haydn's oratorio The Seasons (1801), a meditation on death, quotes the second movement of the 40th Symphony and was included by Haydn as a memorial to his long-dead friend. (Note: See No. 38, the aria "Erblicke hier, bethörter Mensch". Source: Zaslaw & Cowdery 1990, p. 210.)

== Recordings ==
There are great many recordings, both using modern instruments and with instruments more like those of Mozart's time. The first known recording was issued by the Victor Talking Machine Company in 1915, with the Victor Concert Orchestra performing under the direction of Victor's house conductor, Walter B. Rogers.

== See also ==
- Mozart and G minor

== Notes and references ==
Notes

=== Sources ===
- Biba, Otto (2009). "Kommentar", Wolfgang Amadeus Mozart. Sinfonie g-moll, KV 550. Autographe Partitur. Erste und zweite Fassung. Faksimile-Ausgabe. Gesellschaft der Musikfreunde in Wien, p. 8.
- Deutsch, Otto Erich (1965). Mozart: A Documentary Biography. Stanford, California: Stanford University Press.
- Heartz, Daniel (2009). Mozart, Haydn and Early Beethoven, 1781–1802. New York: W. W. Norton. Extracts online at Google Books.
- Hopkins, Antony (1981). The Nine Symphonies of Beethoven. Heineman.
- James, Burnett (1967). An Adventure in Music. London: Baker.
- Nottebohm, Gustav (1887). Zweite Beethoviana. Leipzig: C. F. Peters. Available online Zweite Beethoveniana: at the International Music Score Library Project
- Rosen, Charles (1997). The Classical Style: Haydn, Mozart, Beethoven (expanded ed.). New York and London: W. W. Norton. Online at Google Books.
- Swafford, Jan (1997). Johannes Brahms: A Biography. New York: Alfred A. Knopf.
- Zaslaw, Neal (1983). Introductory notes to a recording of the 31st and 40th Symphonies made by Christopher Hogwood and the Academy of Ancient Music, Oiseau-Lyre 410-197-2
- Zaslaw, Neal; Cowdery, William (1990). "K. 550 Symphony in G minor, No. 40". The Compleat Mozart: A Guide to the Musical Works of Wolfgang Amadeus Mozart. New York: W. W. Norton. pp. 209–210. ISBN 978-0-393-02886-7 – via Internet Archive.
- Zaslaw, Neal (1994). "Mozart as Working Stiff". In James M. Morris (ed.). On Mozart. Washington: Woodrow Wilson Center Press / Cambridge University Press. pp. 102–112. ISBN 9780521476614 – via Internet Archive.
