= Symphony No. 25 (Mozart) =

1773 composition by W. A. Mozart

- by W. A. Mozart
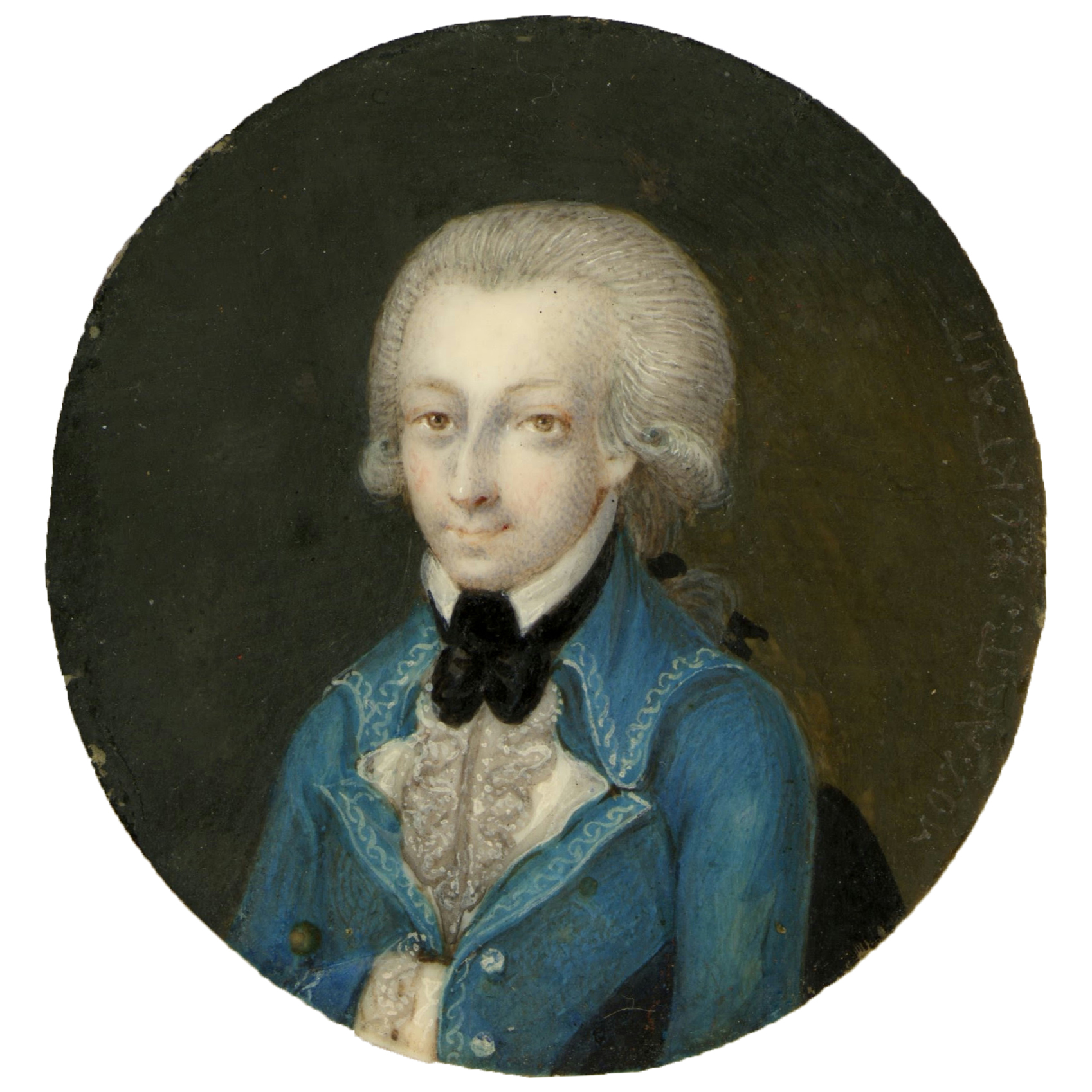
- Mozart in 1773, portrait by Martin Knoller
- Other name: Little G minor symphony
- Key: G minor
- Catalogue: K. 183/173dB
- Composed: October 1773
- Duration: c. 20 minutes
- Movements: 4
- Scoring: Orchestra

The Symphony No. 25 in G minor, K. 183/173 dB, was written by the then 17-year-old Wolfgang Amadeus Mozart in October 1773, shortly after the success of his opera seria Lucio Silla. It was completed in Salzburg on 5 October, a mere two days after the completion of his Symphony No. 24. Its first movement was used as the opening music in Miloš Forman's biographical film Amadeus.

This is one of only two symphonies in minor key that Mozart ever composed, both in G minor, referred to as the "Little G minor Symphony". The other is the No. 40, which is named the "Great G minor Symphony" since it is significantly longer than this one and has a larger scoring.

A typical performance of the symphony would take roughly 20 minutes.

== Movements ==
The symphony is laid out in standard classical form:

1. Allegro con brio, 4/4 in G minor
2. Andante, 2/4 in E♭ major
3. Menuetto & Trio, 3/4 in G minor, Trio in G major
4. Allegro, 2/2 in G minor

This symphony is scored for two oboes, two bassoons, four horns and strings.

=== I. Allegro con brio ===
(complete movement, MIDI-based rendition)

=== II. Andante ===
(complete movement, MIDI-based rendition)

=== III. Menuetto and Trio ===
(complete movement, MIDI-based rendition)

=== IV. Allegro ===
(complete movement, MIDI-based rendition)

== Style and influence ==
With its wide-leap melodic lines and syncopation, this symphony is characteristic of the Sturm und Drang style. It shares certain features with other Sturm and Drang symphonies of this time, and is likely inspired by Haydn's Symphony No. 39, also in G minor.

== Performance history ==
The work was first performed in the United States by the Boston Symphony Orchestra on 27 October 1899 under the direction of Wilhelm Gericke. It was not performed again in the US until 1937, when rendered by the Alfred Wallenstein Sinfonietta. John Barbirolli and the New York Philharmonic performed it again in 1941 as part of their centennial season.

In 1990, Deutsche Grammophon released a recording of this symphony performed by the Vienna Philharmonic conducted by Leonard Bernstein. Other recordings have been made by Otto Klemperer, Ton Koopman, Nikolaus Harnoncourt, Riccardo Muti, Peter Maag, Ádám Fischer, Barry Wordsworth, Jaap ter Linden,

== In popular culture ==
The first movement plays over the opening credits of Amadeus, the 1984 Oscar-winning biographical film about Mozart. This version was recorded by the Academy of St Martin in the Fields and Neville Marriner.

Beginning in the 1990s, the Titan Company (an Indian manufacturer of fashion accessories) released several television advertisements for their Quartz line of watches. Oglivy & Mather, the agency that produced the advertisements, selected a phrase from Allegro con brio as the theme music. These advertisements became iconic and helped popularize the brand. Several versions were produced aside from the traditional arrangement, like one played solely on the piano. Titan also produced an advertisement featuring an electronic backing track overlaid with the theme played on several Indian musical instruments by renowned musicians. These included Ravi Shankar on the sitar and the father-son duo of Alla Rakha and Zakir Hussain on the tabla.
