= Mozart and G minor =

G minor
- Relative key: B-flat major
- Parallel key: G major
- Dominant key: D minor
- Subdominant: C minor

Component pitches
- G, A, B♭, C, D, E♭, F

G minor has been considered the key through which Wolfgang Amadeus Mozart best expressed sadness and tragedy, and many of his minor key works are in G minor. Though Mozart touched on various minor keys in his symphonies, G minor is the only minor key he used as a main key for his numbered symphonies.

In the Classical period, symphonies in G minor almost always used four horns, two in G and two in B♭ alto. Another convention of G minor symphonies observed in Mozart's No. 25 and No. 40 was the choice of the subdominant of the relative key (B♭ major), E♭ major, for the slow movement; other non-Mozart examples of this practice include J. C. Bach Op. 6, No. 6, from 1769, Haydn's No. 39 (1768/69) and Johann Baptist Wanhal's G minor symphony sometime before 1771 (Bryan Gm1).

Isolated sections in this key within Mozart's compositions may also evoke an atmosphere of grand tragedy, one example being the stormy G minor middle section to the otherwise serene B♭ major slow movement in the Piano Concerto No. 20.

== List of works in G minor ==
- God is our refuge, K. 20
- Trio from String Quartet No. 3, K. 156
- Trio from String Quartet No. 14, K. 387
- Andante from Symphony No. 5, K. 22
- Andante from Piano Concerto No. 4, K. 41
- Fugue in G minor, K. 154 (385k) (organ)
- Allegro from String Quartet No. 6, K. 159
- Trio from String Quartet No. 12, K. 172
- Symphony No. 25, K. 183/173dB
- "Vorrei punirti indegno" from La finta giardiniera, K. 196
- "Agnus Dei" from Missa Brevis No. 9, K. 275/272b
- Allegro in G minor, K. 312/189i/590d (first movement of an unfinished sonata)
- 6 Variations in G minor on "Helas, j'ai perdu mon amant", K. 360 (violin and piano)
- Andante con moto from Violin Sonata in E-flat major, K. 380
- "Rex tremendae", and "Domine Jesu Christe" (Andante con moto, G minor) from Requiem in D minor, K. 626
- Fugue in G minor, K. 401/375e (organ)
- Andante un poco sostenuto from Piano Concerto No. 18, K. 456
- Der Zauberer, K. 472
- Piano Quartet No. 1, K. 478
- String Quintet in G minor, K. 516
- Symphony No. 40, K. 550
- "Ach, ich fühl's" from The Magic Flute, K. 620

== See also ==
- Beethoven and C minor
