= 32 Variations in C minor (Beethoven) =

Piano work by Ludwig van Beethoven

32 Variations in C minor
performed in 2010

32 Variations on an Original Theme in C minor, WoO 80 (German: 32 Variationen über ein eigenes Thema), is a composition for solo piano by Ludwig van Beethoven, written in 1806.

== Analysis ==
The work consists of an eight-bar main theme and 32 variations. A chord progression in the left hand, based upon a descending chromatic bass, serves as an important structural device. The short and sparse melodic theme, as well as the emphasis on the bass line, reflect a possible influence of the chaconne and the Folia. The variations have been called "Beethoven’s most overt pianistic homage to the Baroque." The variations differ in character, technical difficulty and dynamics. Pianist Yue Chu points out that the key of C minor indicates that "Beethoven was serious when composing this work," despite his apparent misgivings later.

=== Variations ===
Variation/s	Description
I to III	Consists of arpeggios and repeating notes. The only difference among these three variations is which hands play the arpeggios; in Var. I, the right hand does so, Var. II, the left hand, and Var. III, both hands.
IV	A variation looking into precision of staccato, and the descending bass line is quite prominent.
V	A quiet variation looking at the contrast between staccato and legato.
VI	A turbulent variation marked fortissimo as well as "sempre staccato e sforzato." The sforzatos are indicated in the music.
VII and VIII	Are markedly quieter variations than Var. VI but musically are more difficult.
IX	A variation with many slurs.
X and XI	Marked "sempre forte" with an inversion of the main theme, with the only difference between them being that Var. X's thirty-second notes are played with the left hand, and Var. XI's thirty-second notes with the right hand.
XII to XVI	Marked Maggiore (Italian for "major") and are thus emotionally different from the other variations. These variations are in C major. Var. XII is marked "semplice", so it should not be overplayed, while XIII is even quieter. Var. XIV has staccato thirds, and XV and XVI contain numerous, albeit slow, octaves.
XVII	Marks the return of the minor and is marked "dolce", implying that it should be played more quietly.
XVIII	Offers a stark contrast to Var. XVII, with very rapid right hand scales.
XIX	A variation with arpeggios in the form of sixteenth triplets, as in the Waldstein Sonata.
XX and XXI	Are technically difficult variations with scales.
XXII	Noted for its tenutos and sforzatos.
XXIII	Offers a contrast to Var. XXII and thus is marked pianissimo. It consists of detached chords.
XXIV and XXV	Are light (thus quiet) variations emphasizing staccato and leggiermente, respectively.
XXVI and XXVII	Are technically difficult and consist of thirds.
XXVIII	A stark contrast to XXVII, as it is marked semplice.
XXIX	Consists of difficult arpeggios in the form of sixteenth note triplets.
XXX	A contrast to XXIX and is quite slow.
XXXI	Even quieter than XXX and technically simple, consisting of left hand arpeggios, and the theme is repeated in the right hand in its original form.
XXXII	The last variation, a technically difficult and fast passage. Its main theme consists of left hand 32nd notes and the right hand playing two sevenths, and a group of eight 32nd notes.

Typically, performances of this piece last from 10 to 12 minutes.

== Reception ==
The piece proved popular, receiving a favorable review in the Allgemeine musikalische Zeitung (Leipzig) in 1807, and remains popular today. Nevertheless, Beethoven did not see fit to assign it an opus number. It is said that later in his life he heard a friend practicing it. After listening for some time he said "Whose is that?" "Yours", was the answer. "Mine? That piece of folly mine?" was his retort; "Oh, Beethoven, what an ass you were in those days!"

== See also ==
- Beethoven and C minor
