= Mozart and dance =

Wolfgang Amadeus Mozart's relationship to dance

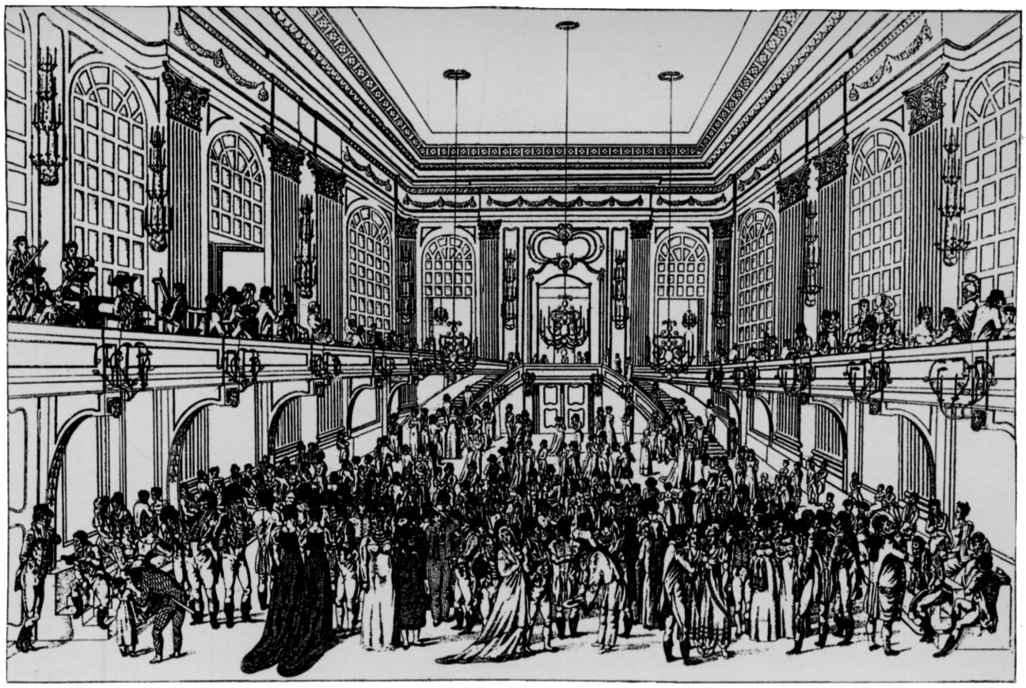
The Großer Redoutensaal (Grand Ballroom) of the Hofburg Imperial Palace in Vienna, where much of Mozart's dance music was first performed

The composer Wolfgang Amadeus Mozart wrote much dance music in a variety of genres, including minuet, contredanse, and German dance. His dances encompass both independent works intended literally for dancing, and symphonic and other movements inspired by dance but intended for listening. Mozart was himself an enthusiastic dancer, with a high level of skill.

== Dance music composed by Mozart ==
About 200 dances by Mozart are still preserved. The modern edition of the dances as published by the Neue Mozart-Ausgabe runs to about 300 total pages in score. For a complete listing of Mozart's dances, see this list.

=== History ===
Mozart began writing dances when he was five years old; see Nannerl Notenbuch. In 1768, when Mozart was 12, his father Leopold reported that Wolfgang had composed "many minuets for all types of instrument". Mozart continued to write dance music for various occasions during the Salzburg period of his life (up to 1781).

Following his move to Vienna, the pace of dance music composition increased, as on 7 December 1787 Mozart was appointed Royal and Imperial Chamber Composer for Emperor Joseph II. This post, though largely a sinecure, (Note: This traditional view is given, for instance, in Solomon (1995, 424). Christoph Wolff suggests that the compositions Mozart prepared as part of his job included more substantial works as well.) had as its main duty the composition of dances for the balls held in the Redoutensälen (public ballrooms) of the Imperial Palace. Mozart complied with this requirement scrupulously, composing dances in great number. He generally wrote dances each year between late December and early March; this reflected the scheduling of the imperial balls, which according to Abert were held "every Sunday during the carnival season, as well as on the last Thursday before Lent and on the last three days of the carnival." There are dances from 1788, 1789, and 1791; none date from 1790 because the Emperor was ill and died February 20 of that year.

=== Genres ===
Mozart's dances are primarily in three genres.

==== Minuet ====
The minuet was slightly old-fashioned by Mozart's time. It was of aristocratic origin, elegant and stately. Mozart wrote his minuets in ternary form; that is, first the minuet proper, then a contrasting trio section, followed by a return of the minuet.

Mozart also wrote a great number of minuets intended for listening rather than dancing: they occur (usually as the third of four movements) in his symphonies, string quartets, and many other works. These minuets are usually longer, faster in tempo and less regular in their phrasing than the minuets meant for dancing.

==== German Dance ====
The German Dance (Deutscher Tanz) originated with the lower social classes. It was much livelier than the minuet and to some degree resembled the waltz. The close physical contact between the dancers, together with constant spinning causing dizziness, led this dance to be attacked as immoral. It was nonetheless danced widely. Mozart's German dances are, like the minuets, in ternary form, but normally with a coda added. Abert notes that the coda "in most cases relates back to the final dance and frequently includes all manner of orchestral jokes". For an example of the German dances, see Three German Dances, K. 605.

==== Contredanse ====
No. 2 from the 5 Contredanses, K. 609 (1791)

The contredanse was a form that descended from English country dance. Like its ancestor, it was rich in figures (individual movements and patterns) and was popular among all social classes.

Mozart composed contredanses as a sequence of multiple sections. They sometimes quote popular melodies; for instance, K. 609 quotes the aria "Non più andrai" from Mozart's opera The Marriage of Figaro.

Of the three genres, minuets predominate in Mozart's early career, the latter two types later on.

=== Instrumentation ===
The core instrumentation of the dances is a simplified orchestra in which there are no violas, and the bass instruments (cello and double bass) play the same line. A variety of wind instruments is usually included, and often trumpets and timpani. To these basic instruments a few dances add additional instruments not ordinarily found in the orchestra of Mozart's time: fife and drum, tambourine, tuned sleighbells, the hurdy-gurdy, the post horn, and the flageolet, which was the piccolo of Mozart's day.

The later dances, which were commercially successful (see below) were retranscribed for other instruments such as piano so that people could play them at home. These transcriptions are usually not the work of Mozart himself.

=== Composition ===
As Flothuis observes, Mozart's dances are generally written strictly in eight- and sixteen-bar phrases, reflecting their function as dance music. They also tend to use a restricted harmonic vocabulary.

Mozart could evidently compose dances very rapidly. His biographer Georg Nikolaus von Nissen narrated an episode from Mozart's visit to Prague in early 1787. In the version given by Abert (2007), Mozart had promised to Count Johann Pachta a set of contredanses. But "his failure to produce these pieces prompted the count to summon him to his home an hour before the meal and to give him writing materials with the instructions that he write the dances there and then as they were to be performed that very day. By the time that the meal had started, nine dances for full orchestra had been completed in full score." Nissen elsewhere relates a similar tale of Mozart composing four fully orchestrated contredanses in less than half an hour; a similar pace.

Perhaps unsurprisingly, Mozart seems to have felt that the composition of dances was not very challenging: he once said that his pay as imperial chamber composer was "too much for what I do, too little for what I could do." (Note: In light of Mozart's fluency in dance composition, some scholars may have been surprised when it emerged that Mozart had made preliminary musical sketches for the contredanse "La Bataille", K. 535 (1788). Wolfgang Plath, who identified the sketch, suggests that "it is time to recognize that making sketches was part of Mozart's normal working practice." (Plath 1998, 115). See also Mozart's compositional method.)

=== Reception ===
Mozart's dances, particularly those composed in his official capacity at the Imperial court, were popular. They were generally printed shortly after their appearance, and according to Solomon the income from the dances partly helped Mozart to recover from the financial distress into which he had fallen in the later 1780s. In later years they were frequently reprinted.

Today, however, it seems that the dances are little performed or recorded, at least in comparison to other Mozart works such as the mature symphonies or concertos. (Note: For instance, The Penguin Guide to Recorded Classical Music (2009), amid very extensive coverage of Mozart recordings, lists only one recording of the composer's dance music.) Nevertheless, they are praised by critics. Alex Ross has written of the dances (2006), "They are exasperating to listen to in large quantity, but they are full of lively, even zany details, and serve as a reminder that eighteenth-century composers were expected to be adept at producing both 'popular' and 'serious' music, and that there was no categorical difference between the two.". Abert (2007) wrote, "the most striking aspect of these dances is their almost literally inexhaustible fund of invention. Although their form offers only limited scope for experimentation, each dance differs from the others." (Note: Abert (2007, 1148). The date is of the current updated edition of Abert; his evaluation dates from the 1920s.) Lindmayr-Brandl (2006) writes that "[the dances] that are accessible today, brought to life in the concert hall or in recordings, represent a precious treasure, the immediate expression of the joy of life."

== Dance in Mozart's operas ==
Mozart included a substantial ballet at the end of his opera Idomeneo (1781); he was going against precedent at the time to write the ballet music himself rather than delegating it to another composer.

The Marriage of Figaro (1786) includes a crucial dance scene in which Susanna passes a feigned love note to Count Almaviva during a fandango. The dance scene was one resisted by the theatrical management at the premiere, and Mozart and his librettist Lorenzo Da Ponte prevailed only with difficulty in including it.

Perhaps the most elaborate dance scene in Mozart's operas is a party scene at the end of the first act of Don Giovanni (1787): guests at his party dance three dances simultaneously, each to its own music in interlocking rhythm. As Lindmayr-Brandl (2006) describes it, the dances are assigned to characters systematically: the social class of each character is matched with the traditional class associations of his or her dance. Thus "the representatives of the nobility —Donna Anna, Donna Elvira, Don Ottavio, with Don Giovanni— begin a minuet, then Don Giovanni invites [the peasant girl] Zerlina to dance a contradanse; (Note: Both Rosen (1971/1997, 323) and Rushton (1981, 16) describe the contredanse as a middle ground: as Rushton puts it, "a dance neither aristocratic nor merely bucolic, but the middle ground on which these two meet".) and finally the servant Leporello dances a German Dance with the peasant Masetto."

== Mozart as a dancer ==
Mozart was taught to dance when he was a small child. His first public appearance as a performer was at age five, when he danced in the Latin play "Sigismundus Rex", put on to celebrate the end of the academic year in Salzburg (1 and 3 September 1761). (His public career as an instrumental performer began only a few months later.) In 1770 (age 14), he wrote a letter to his sister Nannerl from Italy, reporting that "my sole amusement at the moment consists of English [contredanse] steps, and Capriol and spaccat."

Concerning the adult Mozart, biographer Nissen reported "he passionately loved dancing, and missed neither the public masked balls in the theatre, nor his friends' domestic balls. And he danced very well indeed, particularly the minuet." Nissen was presumably relying here on the testimony of Mozart's wife Constanze, whom he married some years after Mozart's death. Another report comes from Mozart's friend the tenor Michael Kelly, who in his Reminiscences wrote, "as great as Mozart's genius was, he was an enthusiast in dancing, and often said that his taste lay in that art, rather than in music."

At least as far as one of his letters indicates, Mozart preferred dancing with partners who could match his own ability. On 6 October 1777 he wrote to his father Leopold from Munich (where he was searching for employment), and reported:

There was dancing, but I only danced four minuets, and by 11 I was back in my room; because with all those girls there, there was only one who could dance in time with the beat, and that was Mademoiselle Käser. (Note: Original German, from Elvers (1961, VII): "Es wurde getanzet, ich tanzte aber nur 4 Menuets, und um 11 uhr war wieder in meinem Zimmer; denn es ware, unter so viell Frauenzimmer, eine einzige welch auf dem Tacte Tanzte, und das war mademoiselle Käser.")

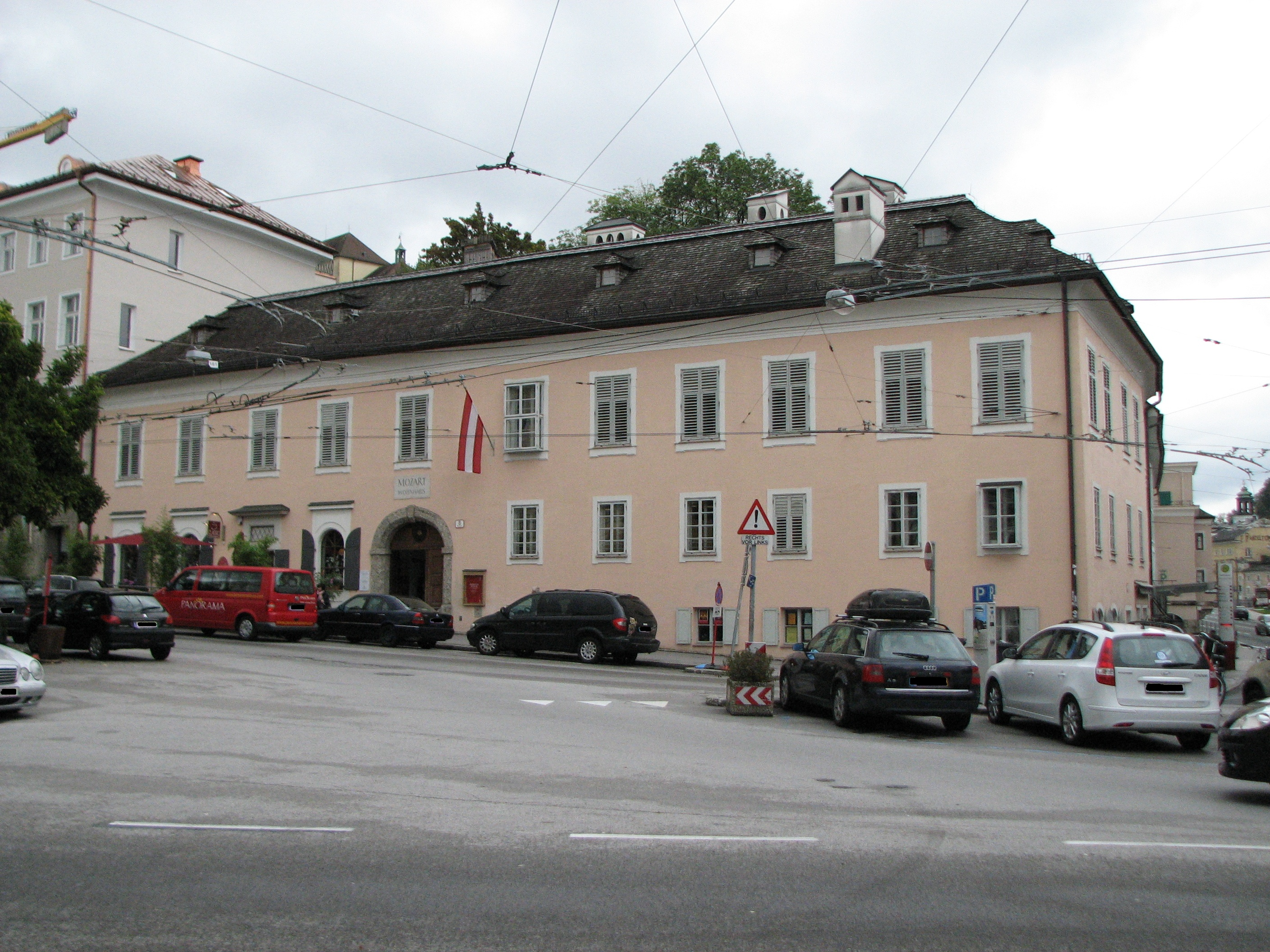
The Tanzmeisterhaus, today a Mozart museum

Mozart had many opportunities to go dancing in his place and time, as ballroom dancing was extremely popular. In addition, during his youth his own family hosted dancing in their home in Salzburg. In 1773, Leopold moved the Mozart family from their lodgings in the Getreidegasse, where Wolfgang and Nannerl had been born, to larger new quarters in the Dancing Master's House (German Tanzmeisterhaus). These rooms, formerly occupied by a dancing master, included a fairly large hall which the Mozarts used for dances (as well as concerts and other activities).

In 1783, after his move to Vienna, Mozart himself hosted a ball, despite the somewhat cramped quarters he occupied with his wife Constanze (three rooms). The event is recorded in a letter he wrote to Leopold (22 January 1783):

Last week I gave a ball in my own rooms; – but it goes without saying that the young beaux paid 2 florins each; we began at 6 in the evening and stopped at 7 – what? only an hour? – no, no – at seven in the morning. (Note: Abert (2007, 724). The original German (Elvers 1961, VII), reads, "vergangene Woche habe ich in meiner Wohnung einen Ball gegeben. – versteht sich aber die chapeaux haben Jeder 2 Gulden bezahlt. – wir haben abends um 6 uhr angefangen und um 7 uhr aufgehört; – was nur eine Stunde? – Nein Nein – Morgens um 7 Uhr." "Chapeaux" is, literally, French for "hats"; it is translated "young beaux" by Abert's translator Stewart Spencer; Deutsch's (1965, 212) translators render it simply as "gentlemen".)

The letter goes on to explain that the ball was held in large empty rooms adjacent to the Mozarts' own apartment, and was well attended.

Another anecdote about Mozart's dancing was told by Johann Anton André, who starting in 1798 became an important posthumous publisher of Mozart's work. André relates a personal encounter with the composer that took place when André was 16 and Mozart 34; Mozart was visiting André's father, also a publisher, in Offenbach during a troubled concert tour of southern Germany in 1790. The younger André later wrote:

Clad in a grey travel coat with short collar, Mozart stopped in front of the André house. No sooner had he alighted from the coach than he was attracted by dance music: the male and female workers of the firm had been given permission to hold a dance. Mozart mixed with them quickly, chose the prettiest girl and danced with her for a long time to his heart's content.
