= Heinrich Joseph von Collin =

Austrian poet, playwright and writer (1771–1811)

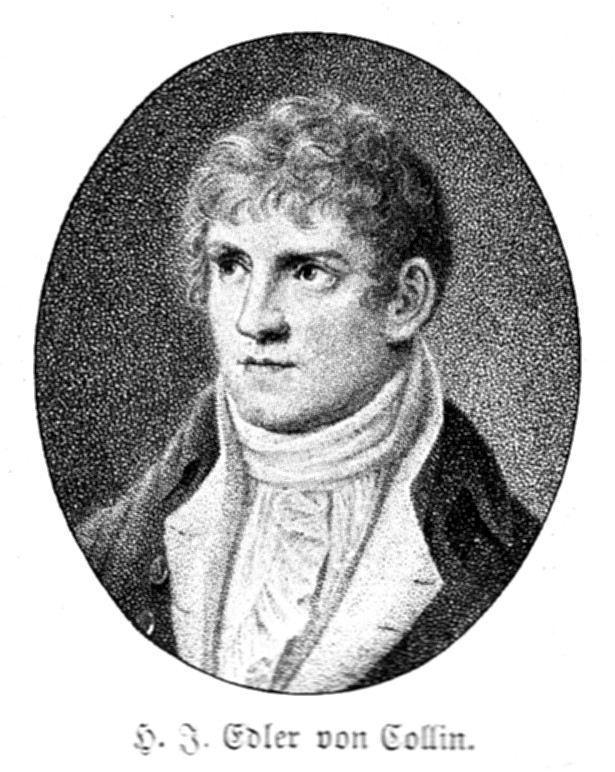
Heinrich Joseph von Collin

Heinrich Joseph von Collin (1771–1811), Austrian dramatist, was born in Vienna, on 26 December 1771. He received a legal education and entered the Austrian ministry of finance where he found speedy promotion. In 1805 and in 1809, when Austria was under the heel of Napoleon, Collin was entrusted with important political missions. In 1803 he was, together with other members of his family, ennobled, and in 1809 made Hofrat. He died on 28 July 1811 in Vienna. Beethoven wrote the overture to Collin's drama Coriolan in 1807.

His tragedy Regulus (1801), written in strict classical form, was received with enthusiasm in Vienna, where literary taste, less advanced than that of northern Germany, was still under the ban of French classicism. But in his later dramas, Coriolan (1804), Polyxena (1804), Balboa (1806), and Bianca della Porta (1808), he made some attempt to reconcile the pseudo-classic type of tragedy with that of Shakespeare and the German romanticists. As a lyric poet (Gedichte, collected 1812), Collin has left a collection of stirring Wehrmannslieder for the fighters in the cause of Austrian freedom, as well as some excellent ballads (Kaiser Max auf der Martinswand, Herzog Leupold vor Solothurn).

His younger brother Matthäus von Collin (1779–1824), was, as editor of the Wiener Jahrbücher für Literatur, an even more potent force in the literary life of Vienna. He was, moreover, in sympathy with the Romantic movement, and intimate with its leaders. His dramas on themes from Austrian national history (Belas Krieg mit dem Vater, (1808); Der Tod Friedrichs des Streitbaren, 1813) may be regarded as the immediate precursors of Grillparzer's historical tragedies.

Heinrich's Gesammelte Werke appeared in 6 vols. (1812–1814); he is the subject of an excellent monograph by F. Laban (1879). See also A. Hauffen, Des Drama der klassischen Periode, ii.2 (1891), where a reprint of Regulus will be found. M. von Collins Dramatische Dichtungen were published in 4 vols. (1815–1817); his Nachgelassene Schriften, edited by J. von Hammer, in 2 vols. (1827). A study of his life and work by J. Wihan will be found in Euphorion, Erganzungsheft, v (1901).

== See also ==
- Coriolan Overture
