= Angela Denoke =

German opera singer

Angela Denoke (born 27 November 1961) is a German opera singer (soprano).

Born in Stade, she studied at the University of Music and Drama of Hamburg. Her first contract was at the Theater Ulm (1992–1996), where she sang Fiordiligi (Così fan tutte), Donna Anna (Don Giovanni) and Agathe (Der Freischütz), among other roles. Angela Denoke sang also the title role in Der Rosenkavalier at the Theater Ulm, in a production directed by Peter Pikl and conducted by James Allen Gähres, in September 1994. This was concurrent with her debut as 'The Marschallin'. She then worked at the Stuttgart Opera and performed at the Vienna State Opera, the Salzburg Festival, and the Metropolitan Opera in New York City.

She regularly sings at all the major opera companies in the world; in Berlin, Hamburg, Dresden, London, Paris, San Francisco, and Chicago. In April 1997, Denoke debuted at the Vienna State Opera as the Marschallin in Der Rosenkavalier, the same role she sang when debuting at the Metropolitan Opera in 2005. July 1997 saw Denoke's debut at the Salzburg Festival, as Marie in Peter Stein's production of Wozzeck, conducted by Claudio Abbado. In 2006, she sang the title role in Richard Strauss' Salome at the Bayerische Staatsoper, directed by William Friedkin and conducted by Kent Nagano.

In opera and in concerts, Denoke worked with conductors such as Claudio Abbado, Daniel Barenboim, Sylvain Cambreling, Christoph Eschenbach, James Allen Gähres, Hartmut Haenchen, Zubin Mehta, Ingo Metzmacher, Kent Nagano, Seiji Ozawa, Mikhail Pletnev, Sir Simon Rattle, Donald Runnicles, Esa-Pekka Salonen, Giuseppe Sinopoli, Stefan Soltesz and Christian Thielemann.

In 1999, she was named Singer of the Year by the magazine Opernwelt.
