= Overture (1965 film) =

1965 film

- Directed by: János Vadász
- Written by: János Vadász
- Cinematography: János Vadász
- Edited by: Zsuzsa Fazekas
- Production company: Hungarofilm
- Release date: April 22, 1965
- Running time: 9 minutes
- Country: Hungary
- Languages: Hungarian (title cards only; no dialogue)

Overture (Hungarian: Nyitány) is a 1965 Hungarian short documentary film written by János Vadász. It won the Short Film Palme d'Or at the 1965 Cannes Film Festival and was nominated for an Academy Award for Best Documentary Short.

== Synopsis ==
After the opening title card, a white blur in the center of a black screen resolves to the shape of a chicken egg. We penetrate the shell, and watch, in time-lapse, the 21-day development of a chicken embryo, from a germ spot on the yolk to the emergence of the baby chick, compressed into under eight minutes, set to Beethoven's Egmont Overture.

== Cultural influences ==
Film uses complete Beethoven's Ouverture to Egmont as soundtrack for image series featuring hatching bird, referencing rebellious nature of Egmont fighting for freedom despite all barriers. Beethoven's Egmont is a set of incidental music pieces for the 1787 play of the same name by Johann Wolfgang von Goethe. The film, nominated for Academy Award for Best Documentary (Short Subject) is described as "among the most ingenious pairings of music and image in the history of the festival."
