= Beethoven and C minor =

Beethoven's use of C minor

C minor
- Relative key: E♭ major
- Parallel key: C major
- Dominant key: G minor
- Subdominant key: F minor

Component pitches
- C, D, E♭, F, G, A♭, B♭

The compositions of Ludwig van Beethoven in the key of C minor carry special significance for many listeners. His works in this key have been said to be powerful and emotive, evoking dark and stormy sentiments.

== Background ==
During the Classical era, C minor was used infrequently and often for works of a particularly turbulent cast. Mozart, for instance, wrote only very few works in this key, but they are among his most dramatic ones (the twenty-fourth piano concerto, the fourteenth piano sonata, the Masonic Funeral Music, the Adagio and Fugue in C minor and the Great Mass in C minor, for instance). Beethoven chose to write a much larger proportion of his works in this key, especially traditionally "salon" (i.e. light and diverting) genres such as sonatas and trios, as a sort of conscious rejection of older aesthetics, valuing the "sublime" and "difficult" above music that is "merely" pleasing to the ear. Paul Schiavo wrote that C minor is a key "that Beethoven associated with pathos, struggle, and expressive urgency."

The key is said to represent for Beethoven a "stormy, heroic tonality"; he uses it for "works of unusual intensity"; and it is "reserved for his most dramatic music".

Pianist and scholar Charles Rosen writes:

Beethoven in C minor has come to symbolize his artistic character. In every case, it reveals Beethoven as a Hero. C minor does not show Beethoven at his most subtle, but it does give him to us in his most extrovert form, where he seems to be most impatient of any compromise.

A characteristic 19th-century view is that of the musicologist George Grove, writing in 1898:

The key of C minor occupies a peculiar position in Beethoven's compositions. The pieces for which he has employed it are, with very few exceptions, remarkable for their beauty and importance.

Grove's view could be said to reflect the view of many participants in the Romantic age of music, who valued Beethoven's music above all for its emotional force.

Not all critics have taken a positive view of Beethoven's habitual return to the tonality of C minor. Musicologist Joseph Kerman faults Beethoven's reliance upon the key, particularly in his early works, as a hollow mannerism:

[T]he 'c-minor mood' in early Beethoven... is one that has dated most decisively and dishearteningly over the years... In this familiar emotional posture, Beethoven seems to be an unknowing prisoner of some conventional image of passion, rather than his own passion's master.

Of the works said to embody the Beethovenian "C minor mood", probably the canonical example is the Fifth Symphony. Beethoven's multi-movement works in C minor tended to have a slow movement in a contrasting major key, nearly always the subdominant of C minor's relative key (E♭ major): A♭ major, providing "a comfortingly cool shadow or short-lived respite", but also the relative key (E♭ major, Op. 1/3), the tonic major (C major, Opp. 9/3, 18/4, 111) and the sharpened mediant major (E major, Op. 37), the last setting a precedent for Brahms' third Piano Quartet, Grieg's Piano Concerto and Rachmaninoff's second Piano Concerto.

In his essay "Beethoven's Minority", Kerman observes that Beethoven associated C minor with both its relative (E♭) and parallel (C) majors, and was continually haunted by a vision of C minor moving to C major. While many of Beethoven's sonata-form movements in other minor keys, particularly finales, used the minor dominant (v) as the second key area – predicting a recapitulation of this material in the minor mode – his use of the relative major, E♭ (III) as the second key area for all but two of his C minor sonata-form movements, in many cases, facilitated a restatement of part or all of the second theme in C major in the recapitulation. One exception, the first movement of the Piano Sonata No. 32, uses A♭ major (VI) as its second key area, also allowing a major-mode restatement in the recapitulation – and the other exception, the Coriolan Overture, is only loosely in sonata form and still passes through III in the exposition and major-mode I in the recapitulation. Furthermore, of the final movements of Beethoven's multi-movement works in C minor, three are in C major throughout (Opp. 67, 80, 111), one finishes in C major (Op. 37), and a further four (along with one first movement) end with a Picardy third (Opp. 1/3, 9/3, 10/1, 18/4, 111 i).

== List of works ==
Here is a list of works by Beethoven in C minor that were felt by George Grove to be characteristic of how Beethoven used this key:

- Cantata on the Death of Emperor Joseph II, WoO 87 (1791)
- Piano Trio, Op. 1, No. 3 (1793)
- Presto for piano, WoO 52 (1795)
- Allegretto for piano, WoO 53 (1796-7)
- Piano Sonata, Op. 10, No. 1 (1795-8)
- Piano Sonata, Op. 13, "Pathétique" (1798)
- String Trio, Op. 9, No. 3 (1798)
- Piano Concerto No. 3, Op. 37 (1800)
- String Quartet, Op. 18, No. 4 (1800)
- Piano Sonata No. 13, Op. 27, No. 1, 2nd movement (1800)
- Violin Sonata, Op. 30, No. 2 (1802)
- Symphony No. 3, Op. 55, second movement, "Funeral March" (1803)
- 32 Variations in C minor, WoO 80 (1806)
- Coriolan Overture, Op. 62 (1807)
- Fifth Symphony, Op. 67 (1808)
- Choral Fantasy, Op. 80 (1808)
- String Quartet No. 10, Op. 74, scherzo movement (1809)
- Piano Sonata No. 26, Op. 81a, second movement, "Abwesenheit" (1810)
- Piano Sonata No. 32, Op. 111 (his last piano sonata, 1822)

== See also ==
- Mozart and G minor
