= James Allen Gähres =

American classical composer

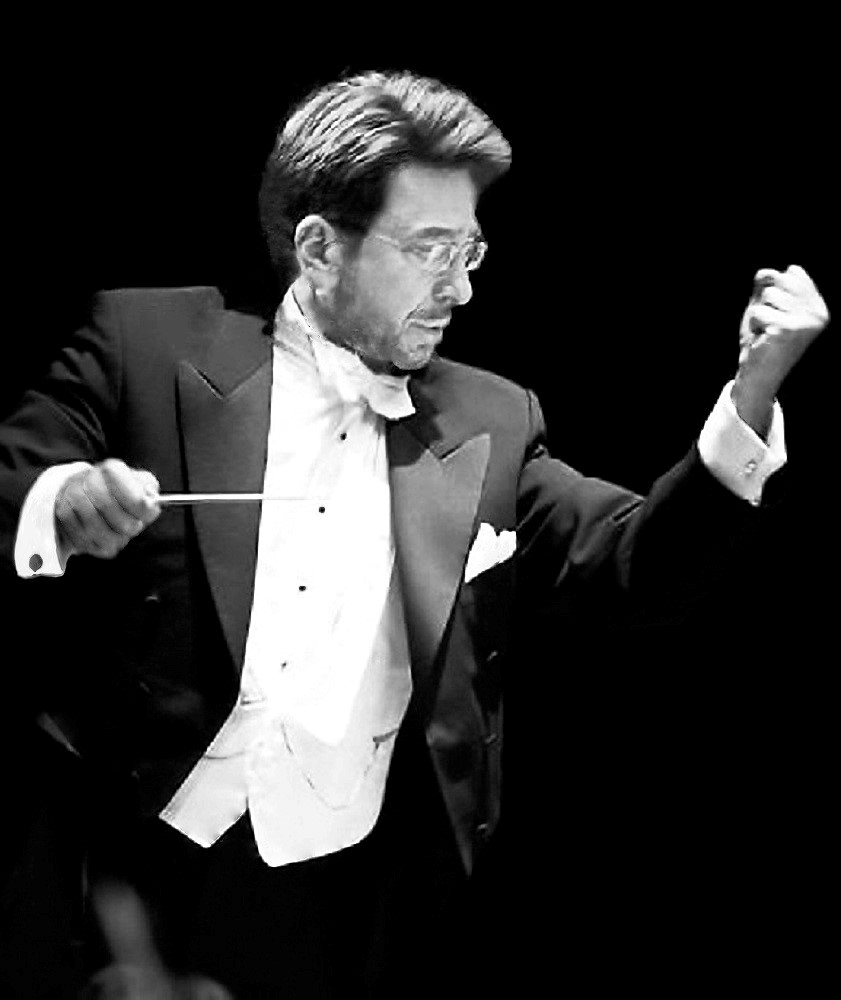
- James Allen Gähres in 2011
- Born: August 5, 1943 (age 83); Harrisburg, United States of America
- Education: Peabody Conservatory of Music, Baltimore; University of Music and Performing Arts, Vienna
- Occupations: Conductor; Pianist; Composer
- Years active: 1969–present
- Style: Classical music

James Allen Gähres (born August 5, 1943, in Harrisburg, Pennsylvania) is an American conductor with an international career, based in Germany.

== Biography ==
Gähres studied music, conducting, composition and piano at the Peabody Conservatory of Music in Baltimore, where he was musical assistant of the Peabody Symphony Orchestra in his final study year, and as a Fulbright-Fellowship holder with Hans Swarovsky at the University of Music and Performing Arts Vienna. He attended Master classes with Bruno Maderna in Salzburg.

He began his conducting career began after several years as a freelance composer and pianist in southern Germany. Gähres worked as a conductor at several opera houses in Germany, including 10 years as first Kapellmeister at the Staatsoper Hannover. Then he was engaged as the first conductor at the Staatstheater Braunschweig for three years. His work in Germany included conducting the German premiere of Leonard Bernstein's Candide, in the Scottish Opera version, at the Deutsche Oper Berlin, at the invitation of Götz Friedrich. He also worked regularly with the Lower Saxony Youth Symphony Orchestra and the Youth Symphony Orchestra of the Saarland on concert tours, in Israel, Spain, the United States, France, Great Britain and Canada.

Gähres worked repeatedly as guest conductor at the New York City Opera, the Heidelberger Schlossfestspiele, the Polish Grand Theatre, Poznan, with the Deutsches Symphonie-Orchester Berlin, the Radio Symphony Orchestra Hannover, the Bavarian Radio Symphony Orchestra, as well as at the Deutsche Oper Berlin, at the Opernhaus Dortmund, the Staatsoper Stuttgart, the Bavarian State Opera in Munich, and at the Teatro di San Carlo, Naples.

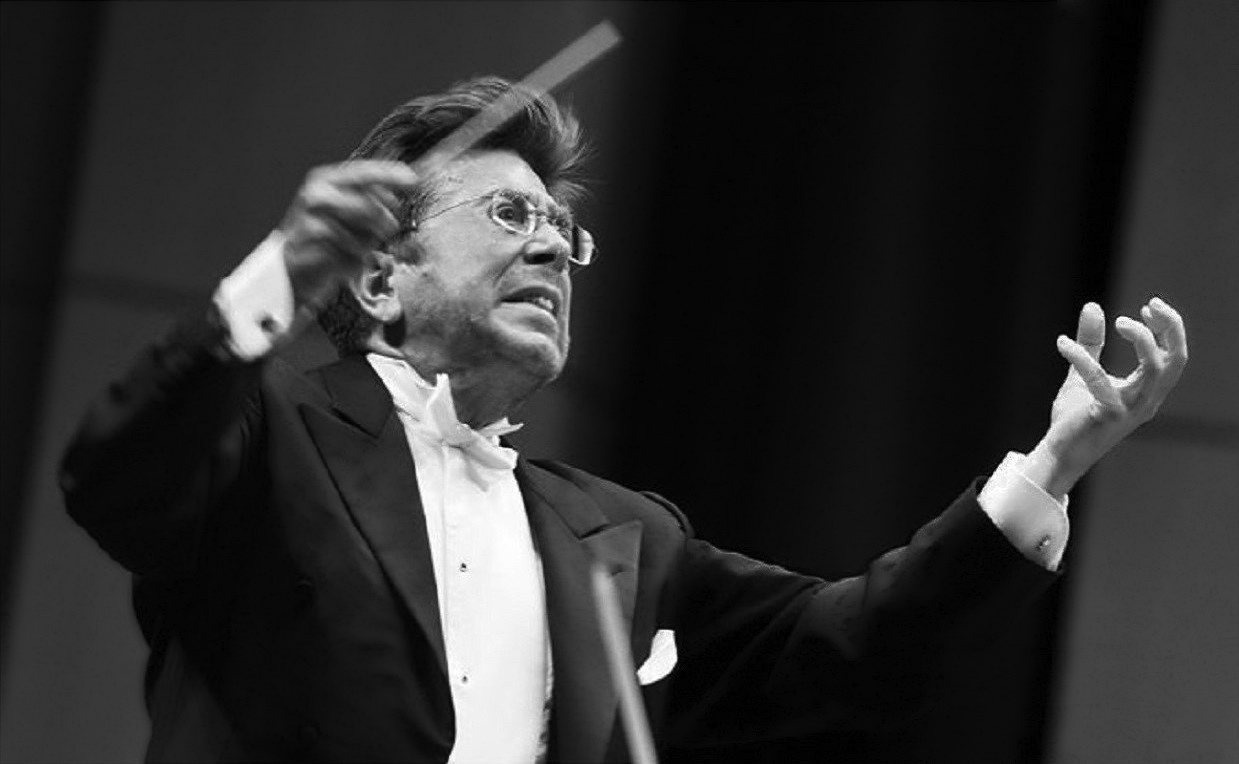
James Allen Gähres conducting a philharmonic concert (2011)

From 1994 to 2011, Gähres was Generalmusikdirektor (General Music Director, GMD) at the Theater Ulm, which also encompassed the post of chief conductor of the Ulm Philharmonic Orchestra. During his Ulm tenure, Gähres founded the tradition of the New Year's concerts and of the Herbert von Karajan Memorial concerts. He recorded more than 15 CDs as chief conductor in Ulm.

Gähres was also guest conductor of the Leipzig Gewandhaus Orchestra in The Magic Flute by Wolfgang Amadeus Mozart at the Leipzig Opera, the Meiningen Court Orchestra in Meiningen, the West Virginia Symphony Orchestra in Charleston, West Virginia as well as of the Philharmonic Orchestra of the Theater für Niedersachsen in Hildesheim.

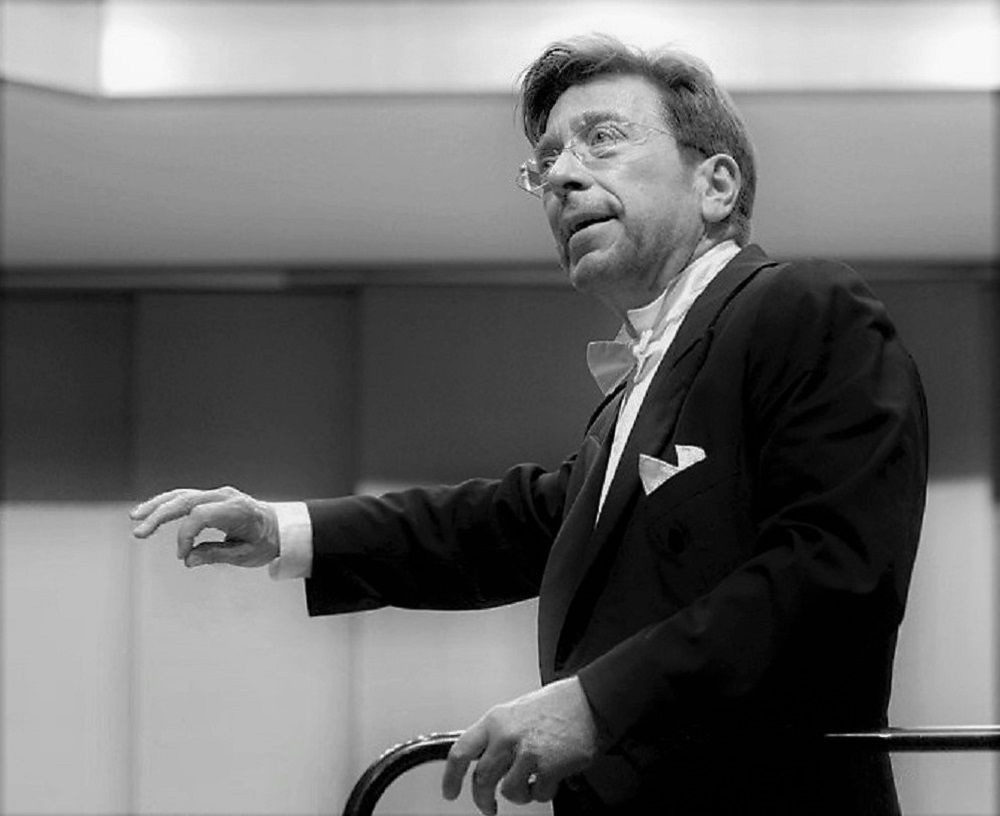
James Allen Gähres after conducting a philharmonic concert

Overture to 'Coriolan'
Ludwig van Beethoven - Overture to 'Coriolan', Op. 62 conducted by James Allen Gähres

The Ride of the Valkyries
Richard Wagner - The Valkyrie - The Ride of the Valkyries conducted by James Allen Gähres

== Selected discography ==
- Ludwig van Beethoven, Piano Concerto No. 5, Op. 73 "Emperor Concerto" – Ulm Philharmonic/James Allen Gähres, 1999 SCM
- Ludwig van Beethoven, Symphony No. 5, Op. 67, and the Coriolan Overture in C minor, Op. 62 – Ulm Philharmonic/James Allen Gähres, 2000 SCM
- Alban Berg, Erich Wolfgang Korngold, Richard Strauss, Glück, das mir verblieb ... Wozzeck, Die tote Stadt (The Dead City), Der Rosenkavalier (The Knight of the Rose) – Ulm Philharmonic/James Allen Gähres, 2000 SCM
- Wolfgang Amadeus Mozart, Requiem in D minor, K. 626 and Maurerische Trauermusik (Masonic Funeral Music) in C minor, K. 477 (K. 479a) – Ulm Philharmonic/James Allen Gähres, 2000 SCM
- Modest Mussorgsky/Maurice Ravel, Pictures at an Exhibition – Ulm Philharmonic/James Allen Gähres, 2001 SCM
- Sergei Rachmaninoff, Symphonic Dances, Op. 45 – Ulm Philharmonic/James Allen Gähres, 1999 SCM
- Rodion Shchedrin Great moments Vol. 1, First Live Recordings of Carmen Suite, Self-Portrait and Two Tangos by Albéniz for orchestra – Ulm Philharmonic/James Allen Gähres, 2001 SCM
- Richard Wagner, Selections from Der Ring des Nibelungen – Ulm Philharmonic/James Allen Gähres, 2000 SCM
- Christmas concert, works by Johann Sebastian Bach, Irving Berlin, George Frideric Handel, Wolfgang Amadeus Mozart, Sergei Prokofiev and Ralph Vaughan Williams – Ulm Philharmonic/James Allen Gähres, 2000 SCM
- Angela Denoke: Singer of the Year 1999 – a reminiscence of the years in Ulm, Alban Berg, Leoš Janáček, Wolfgang Amadeus Mozart, Richard Strauss, Pyotr Ilyich Tchaikovsky – Angela Denoke (soprano), Ulm Philharmonic/James Allen Gähres, 2000 SCM
- Neujahrskonzerte/New Year's Concerts, The Blue Danube, works by Johann Strauss II – Ulm Philharmonic/James Allen Gähres, 2000 SCM
- New Year's Concert (live) – Ulm Philharmonic/James Allen Gähres, 2001 SCM
- New Year's Concert (live) – Ulm Philharmonic/James Allen Gähres, 2004 SCM
- Symphony concerts, works by Hector Berlioz, Johannes Brahms, Charles Ives, Jean Sibelius, Richard Strauss, Pyotr Ilyich Tchaikovsky – Angela Denoke (soprano), Tamás Füzesi (violin), Ulm Philharmonic/James Allen Gähres, 2000 SCM
- Leo Nucci sings works by Giuseppe Verdi und Ruggero Leoncavallo, Herbert von Karajan Memorial concert – Ulm Philharmonic/James Allen Gähres, 2003 SCM

Cultural offices
Preceded by Alicja Mounk	Generalmusikdirektor, Theater Ulm; 1994–2011	Succeeded by Timo Handschuh
