= Egmont (Beethoven) =

Incidental music for 1787 play by Goethe

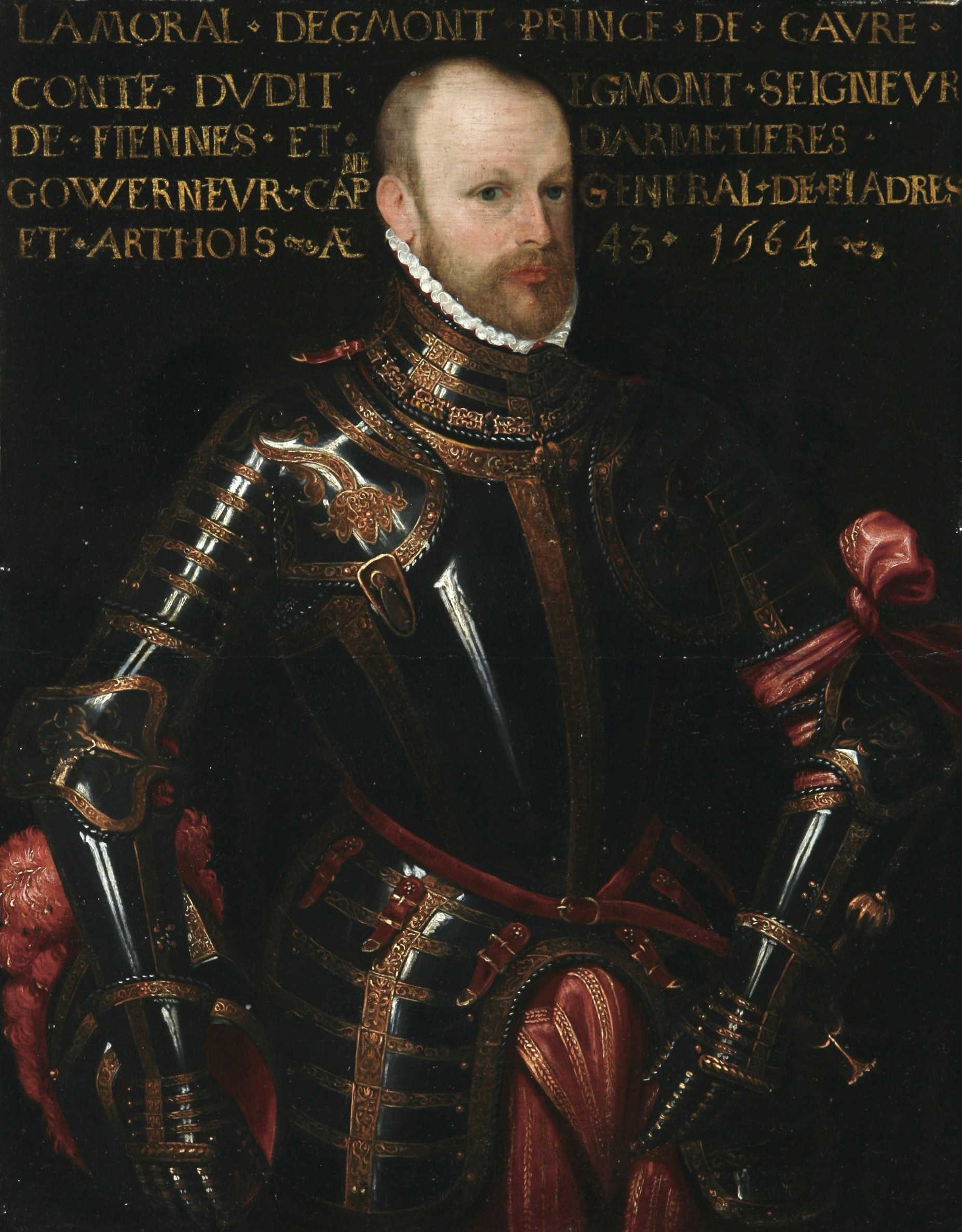
Count of Egmont

Egmont, Op. 84 by Ludwig van Beethoven, is a set of incidental music pieces for the 1787 play of the same name by Johann Wolfgang von Goethe. It consists of an overture followed by a sequence of nine pieces for soprano, male narrator, and full symphony orchestra. The male narrator is optional; he is not used in the play and does not appear in some recordings of the complete incidental music.

Beethoven wrote the music between October 1809 and June 1810. The work premiered on 15 June 1810.

The subject of the music and dramatic narrative is the life and heroism of 16th-century nobleman Lamoral, Count of Egmont from the Low Countries. It was composed during the Napoleonic Wars when the First French Empire had extended its domination over vast swaths of Europe. Beethoven had famously expressed his great outrage over Napoleon's decision to crown himself emperor in 1804, furiously scratching out his name in the dedication of the Eroica Symphony. In the music for Egmont, Beethoven expressed his own political concerns through the exaltation of the heroic sacrifice of a man condemned to death for having taken a valiant stand against oppression. The overture became an unofficial anthem of the Hungarian Revolution of 1956.

Beethoven composed Klärchen's songs "Die Trommel gerühret" ("The drum is a-stirring") and "Freudvoll und leidvoll" ("Joyful and woeful") with Austrian actress Antonie Adamberger specifically in mind, and she often spoke enthusiastically of her collaboration with him. E. T. A. Hoffmann praised the music for its poetry and its success in associating with the play, and Goethe himself declared Beethoven had expressed his intentions with "a remarkable genius".

The overture is powerful and expressive, one of the last works of Beethoven's middle period. It has become as famous a composition as the Coriolan Overture and possesses a style similar to the Fifth Symphony, which the composer completed two years earlier.

== Sections ==
The incidental music comprises the following sections, among which the overture, the lieder "Die Trommel gerühret", "Freudvoll und leidvoll" and "Klärchens Tod" are particularly well-known:

Egmont overture

1. Overture: Sostenuto, ma non troppo – Allegro
2. Lied: "Die Trommel gerühret"
3. Entracte: Andante
4. Entracte: Larghetto
5. Lied: "Freudvoll und leidvoll"
6. Entracte: Allegro – Marcia
7. Entracte: Poco sostenuto e risoluto
8. Klärchens Tod
9. Melodram: "Süßer Schlaf"
10. Siegessymphonie (symphony of victory): Allegro con brio

== Cultural influences ==
The Hungarian film Overture by János Vadász, which won the 1965 Cannes Film Festival's Short Film Palme d'Or, uses the complete Egmont overture as the soundtrack for a series of images featuring a hatching bird. The sequence was described as "among the most ingenious pairings of music and image in the history of the festival".
