= Fulda Symphonic Orchestra =

The Fulda Symphonic Orchestra (German: Fuldaer Symphonisches Orchester) is an amateur orchestra based in Fulda, Germany. The group was founded in 1999 by Karsten Aßmann (orchestra manager), Albert Flügel (concertmaster), Dorothea Heller (co-principal woodwind player), and the music director Simon Schindler; Aßmann and Schindler were only 21 and 23 at the time. The more than 100 players are mostly amateurs, with an admixture of professionals. The players range in age from 16 to 70.

The group performs one concert per year, for which they rehearse for two weekends. Virtually all of the players either live in Fulda or grew up there and return for the concerts. The annual performance is a benefit concert for a selected charitable cause, supported by the Rotary Club of Fulda. In addition, smaller groups made up of orchestra personnel perform throughout the year.

The Fulda Symphonic Orchestra has posted sound files from its performances on the Internet under the EFF open audio license, and thus is an important source of freely-listenable recordings of symphonic masterworks.
