= German Dance =

The German Dance, also known as Deutsche, Deutscher Tanz and Teutsche, was a generic term utilized in the late 18th and early 19th centuries for partner dances written in triple metre. These encompassed several different types of dances, including the waltz, ländler, and allemande. Composers of German Dances frequently wrote and published them in sets of three, six, or twelve for use at balls. Many composers published sets of Deutsche, including Joseph Haydn, Wolfgang Amadeus Mozart, Ludwig van Beethoven, and Franz Schubert to name a few.
