= Coriolan Overture =

Composition by Beethoven

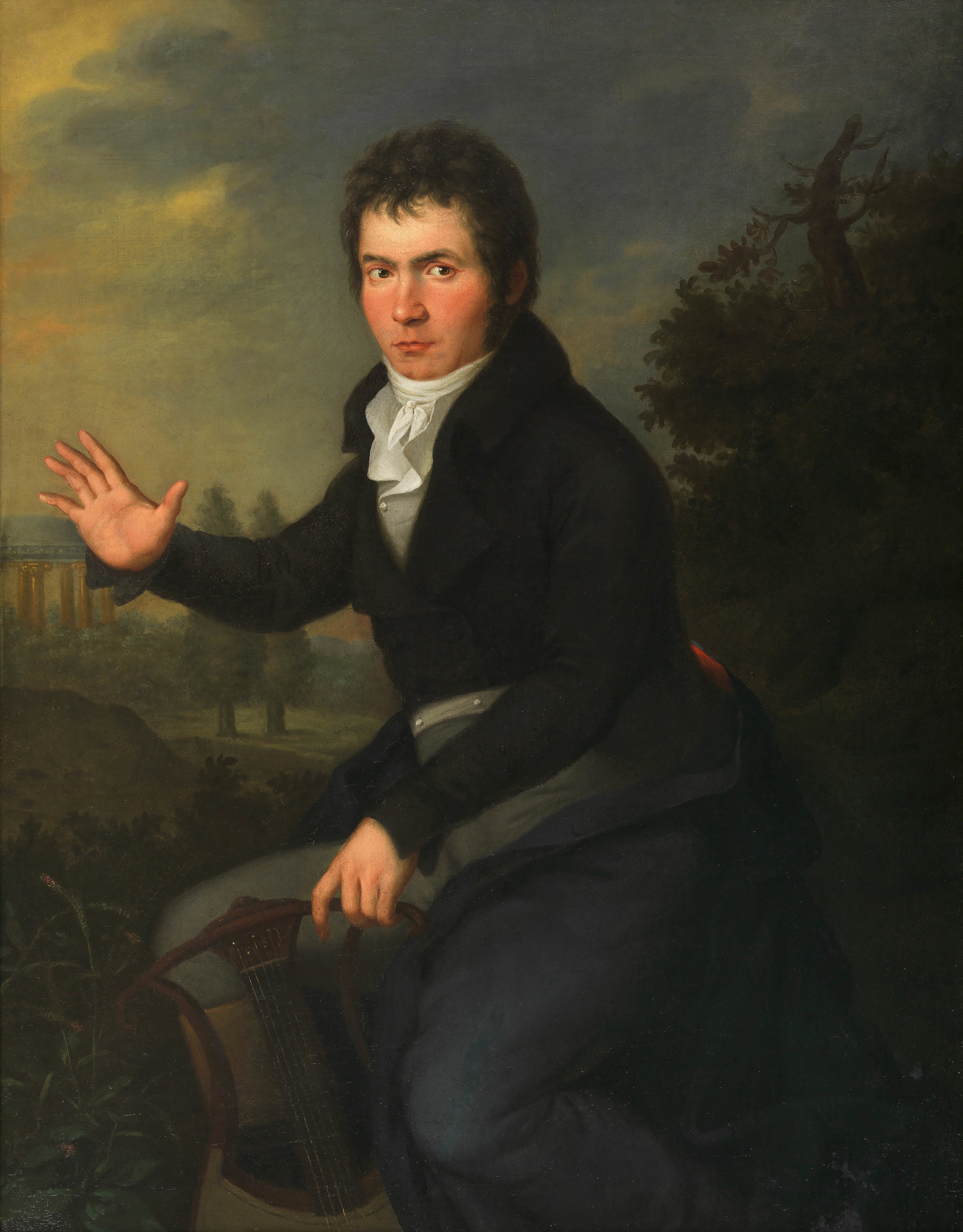
Portrait of Ludwig van Beethoven (age 33) with a lyre-guitar by Joseph Willibrord Mähler (c. 1804)

The Coriolan Overture (German: Coriolan-Ouvertüre or Ouvertüre zu Coriolan), Op. 62, is an 1807 composition for orchestra by Ludwig van Beethoven inspired by Heinrich Joseph von Collin's 1804 five-act tragedy Coriolan, premiered on 23 November 1802 at the Burgtheater, and published in 1804. (Note: The Overture was not, as is sometimes claimed, written for William Shakespeare's play Coriolanus, although both works are about the ancient Roman leader Gaius Marcius Coriolanus.)

The overture was premiered in March 1807 at a private concert in the Vienna home of the arts patron Joseph Franz von Lobkowitz. The Symphony No. 4 in B♭ and the Piano Concerto No. 4 in G were premiered at the same concert. It is dedicated to Collin.

== Context ==
The structure, in sonata form, and themes of the overture follow the play only generally - "the work remains remarkably self-contained, musically and formally". The main C minor theme ('Allegro con brio') represents Coriolanus' resolve and war-like tendencies (he is about to invade Rome), while the more tender E♭ major theme represents the pleadings of his mother to desist. Coriolanus eventually gives in to tenderness, but since he cannot turn back having led an army of his former enemies, the Volsci, to Rome's gates, he kills himself. (This differs from the better-known play Coriolanus by William Shakespeare, in which he is murdered. Both Shakespeare's and Collin's plays are about the same semi-legendary figure, whose actual fate was not recorded.)

Winton Dean identified Méhul's overture to his opera Mélidore et Phrosine (1794) as a precursor in terms of its "stormy D minor allegro with a distinct anticipation of Coriolan". One of Wagner's longest 'programmatic elucidations' of musical works in 1852–54 is that for Beethoven's Coriolan Overture.

The Coriolan Overture is scored for two flutes, two oboes, two clarinets in B♭, two bassoons, two horns in E♭, two trumpets in C, timpani, and strings.

== Recordings ==
The overture has been recorded many times. Early recordings include the Berlin State Opera Orchestra and Bruno Walter in 1923, the Amsterdam Concertgebouw Orchestra and Willem Mengelberg in 1926, and the Berlin State Opera Orchestra again, with Otto Klemperer in 1927. For a Diapason survey in 2015, after comparisons Rémy Louis chose the Berlin Philharmonic conducted by Wilhelm Furtwängler in 1943, and the Chicago Symphony Orchestra under Fritz Reiner in 1959. Period performances include the London Classical Players under Roger Norrington and Academy of Ancient Music with Christopher Hogwood.

== Notes ==
Performed by the Fulda Symphonic Orchestra, conducted by Simon Schindler
Performed by the Czech National Symphony Orchestra for the Musopen Kickstarter Project
Performed by the Ulm Philharmonic, conducted by James Allen Gähres

Citations

Sources

- Joseph Kerman, Alan Tyson, "Ludwig van Beethoven", Grove Music Online, ed. L. Macy (Accessed 21 August 2007)
