= Portraits of Mozart =

Art claimed to show the Austrian composer

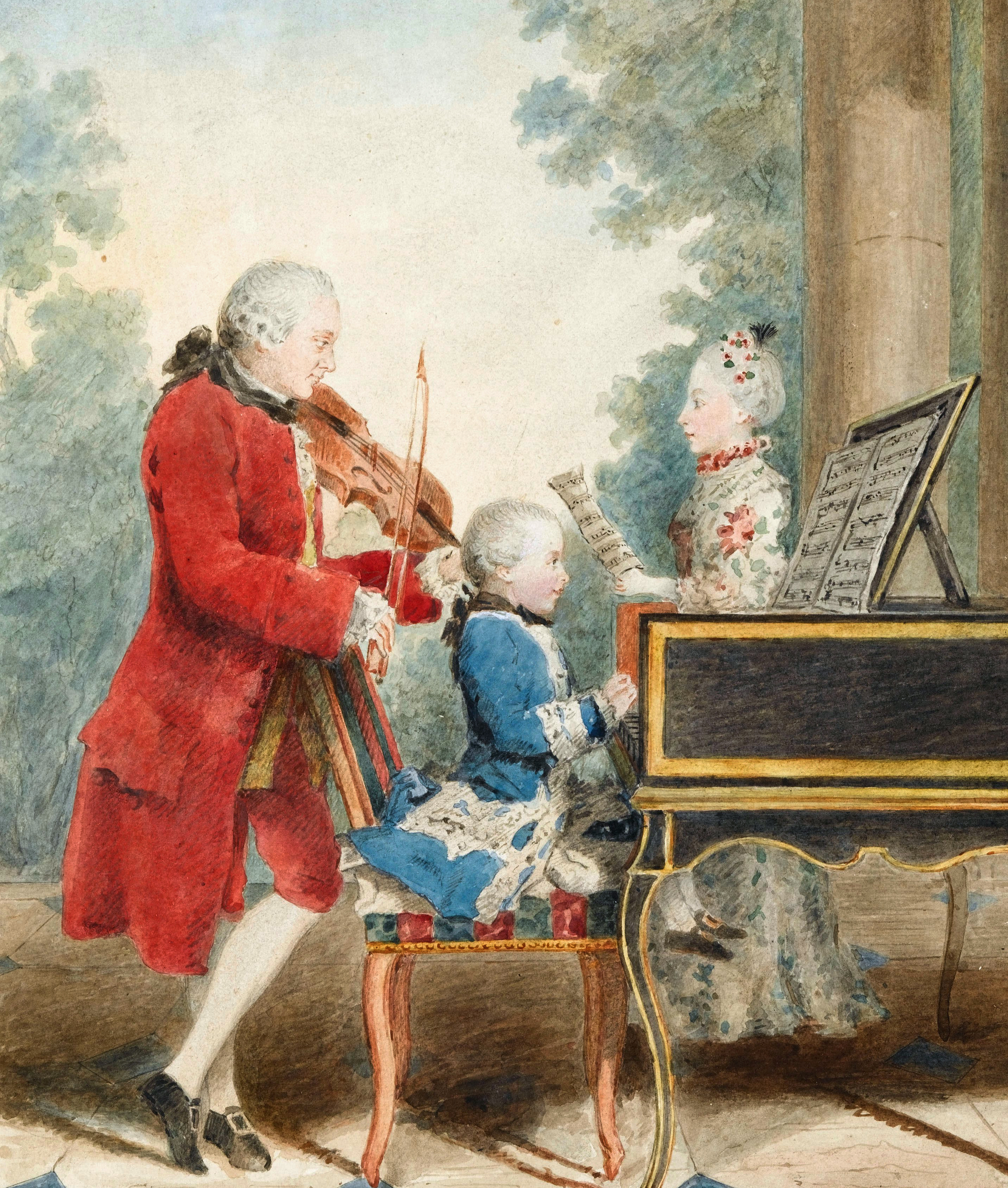
Detail of Carmontelle's Mozart family watercolour

Numerous historical paintings and other works of art purport to depict the composer Wolfgang Amadeus Mozart. Of these, only a fraction can be shown by historical evidence to be authentic portrayals. The others are variously fraudulent, attribution errors, or sentimental works of the imagination. Of the authentic portraits, the posthumous 1819 painting by Barbara Krafft is the best known. The task of distinguishing authentic from inauthentic portraits has occupied Mozart scholars for many years.

== Background ==
Mozart's physical appearance was described by family and friends, among them his wife Constanze, his sister Nannerl and his colleague Michael Kelly. These descriptions share some common traits: Mozart's small stature, thin frame, and pale complexion. The composer's face was marked by his childhood case of smallpox. He had a prominent nose, large blue eyes and a small mouth.

Only a few portraits of Mozart were made during his lifetime; most portraits were realised after his death, as his fame spread. According to Robert Bory, 62 portraits of Mozart and pictorial representations of all kinds exist; but they vary widely in size, media used, style, and above all, authenticity. Mozart experts who have examined the portraits, such as Arthur Hutchings, Arthur Schurig and Alfred Einstein, emphasize the contrast between the sheer number of artworks that purport to represent Mozart and their sparse iconographic value. Schurig wrote in 1913: "Mozart has been the subject of more portraits quite unrelated to his actual appearance than any other famous man. An adoring posterity has not conceived a more incorrect physical image of any other notability." Such views arise from the analysis of the existing paintings, miniatures, sketches, drawings, cameos, and engravings of the composer.

The German musicologist Emil Vogel realised the first detailed study of the Mozart iconography in 1899, followed by Edward Speyer in 1916 and 1919. Arthur Schurig recopilated and described the available portraits (classified as authentic, dubious and inauthentic) in an appendix of his 1920 edition of Leopold Mozart's travel notes from between 1763 and 1771. Julius Leisching in 1926 and Max Zenger in 1941 made further studies in the vein of Schurig. Otto Erich Deutsch established in 1961 an exhaustive list of the authentic portraits and the forgeries, mostly from the 19th century. The conclusion of this work is that only eight works of art, of unequal interest, were produced by authors who knew Mozart directly, or by sketches taken from drawings made from life. Since then, Mozart's "biographical paintings" have been published with more care, generally following the criteria that emerged from this analysis.

The inauthentic portraits consist of three types. First are portraits of other people (most often young male musicians), claimed later to be of Mozart. Second are forgeries of various kinds, created for money or fame, in which the image is claimed to represent Mozart but is fabricated. The third category is formed by fantastical paintings, the product of the artist's imagination, with no basis in Mozart's actual appearance or in existing iconography. Most of these are inspired by the abundant supply of myths and legends that arose surrounding Mozart. The inauthentic portraits are not always worthless, since some of them provide informative iconographic data on musical instruments of Mozart's time, or on the other people who appear in them.

== Authentic portraits ==
Even the few portraits that have passed muster as authentic have not escaped criticism. Alfred Einstein wrote: "No earthly remains of Mozart survived save a few wretched portraits, no two of which are alike".

=== Anonymous 1763 portrait ===
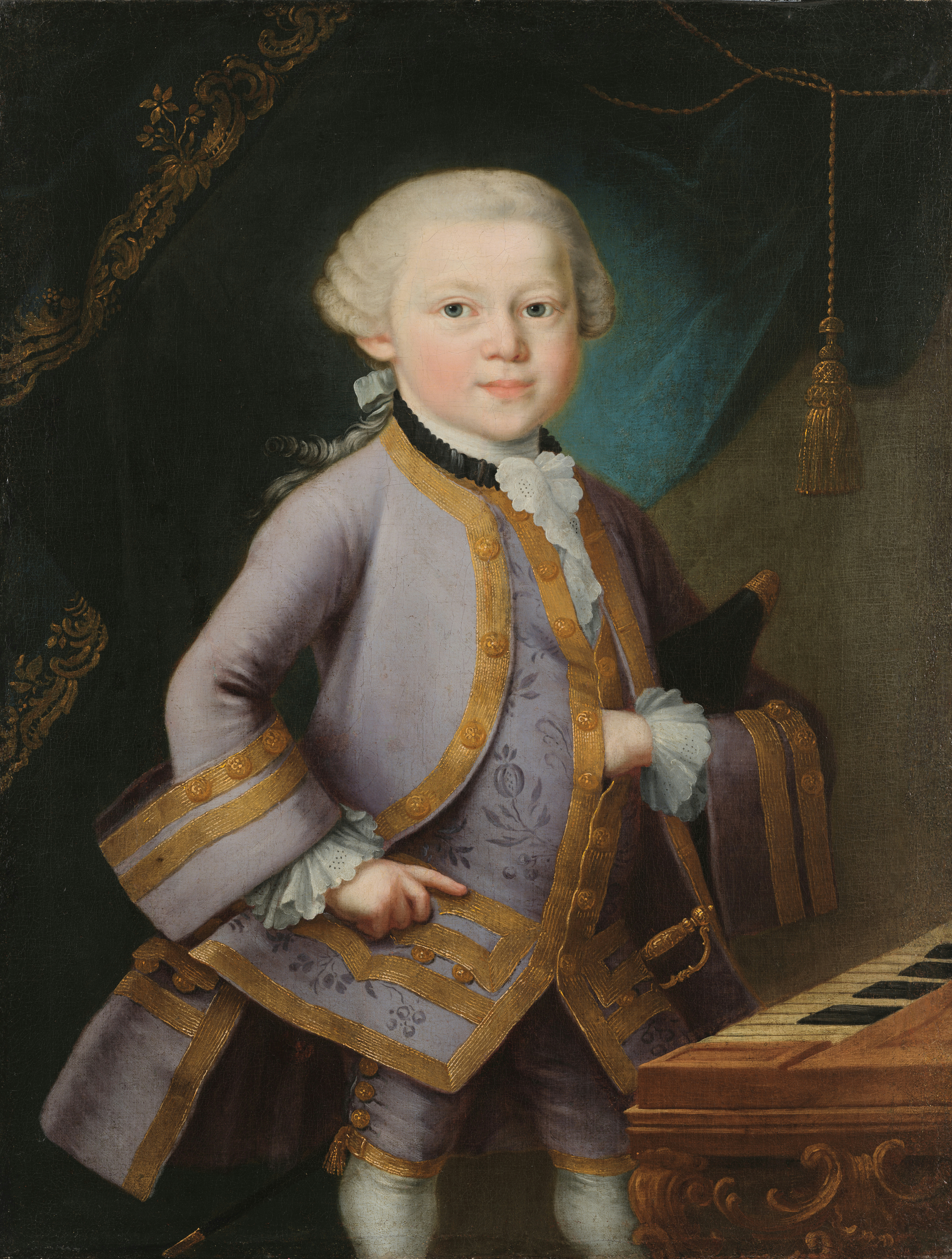
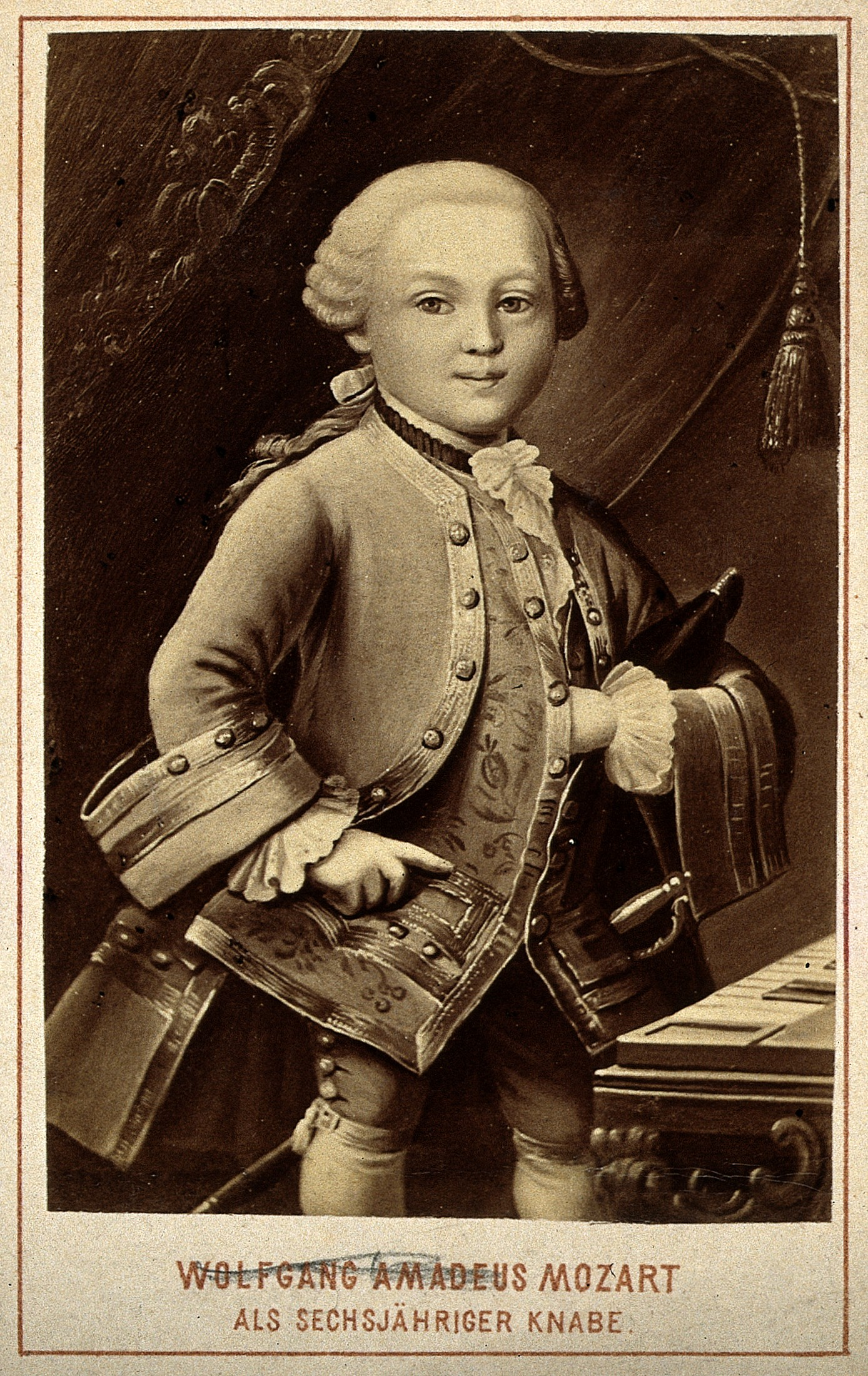
Original portrait and subsequent lithograph copy. The caption, in German, reads "Wolfgang Amadeus Mozart as a six-year-old boy".

This shows Mozart in front of a keyboard looking at the viewer, dressed in court costume given to him in 1762 as a gift from Empress Maria Theresa, which came from the wardrobe of Archduke Maximilian Francis of Austria, as documented in a letter by Wolfgang's father Leopold Mozart on 19 October 1762.

Do you want to know how Woferl’s [Wolfgang] suit looks? – It is one of those with the finest lilac-coloured cloth, the waistcoat in mohair of the same colour, the coat and camisole bordered with wide, double gold braid. They were made for Prince Maximilian

It was commissioned by Leopold himself and is considered to be the earliest authentic portrait of Mozart. It is attributed to the Austrian painter Pietro Antonio Lorenzoni, who also painted Wolfgang's sister Maria Anna Mozart, often known today by her family name "Nannerl". It was created shortly before the family embarked on their three-year tour through Western Europe. The artist executed first the interiors, instruments and clothes before the children posed. It is oil on canvas, and currently owned by the Mozarteum in Salzburg (inherited directly from the Mozart family) and displayed at Mozart's birthplace. It was widely distributed in biographies and other publications through lithographs, some of which modify Mozart's face as in this example.

=== Carmontelle's 1763–64 family portrait ===
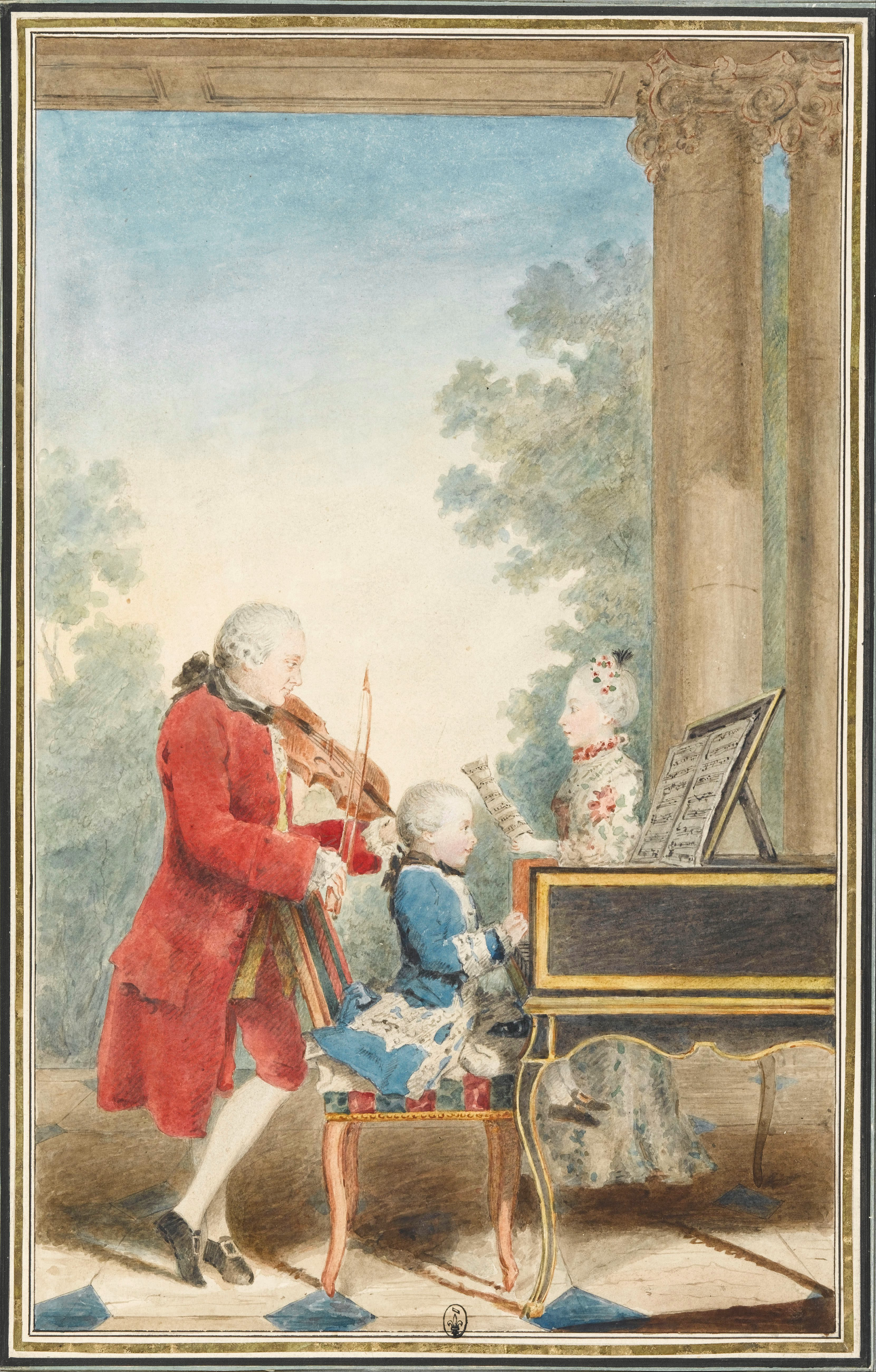
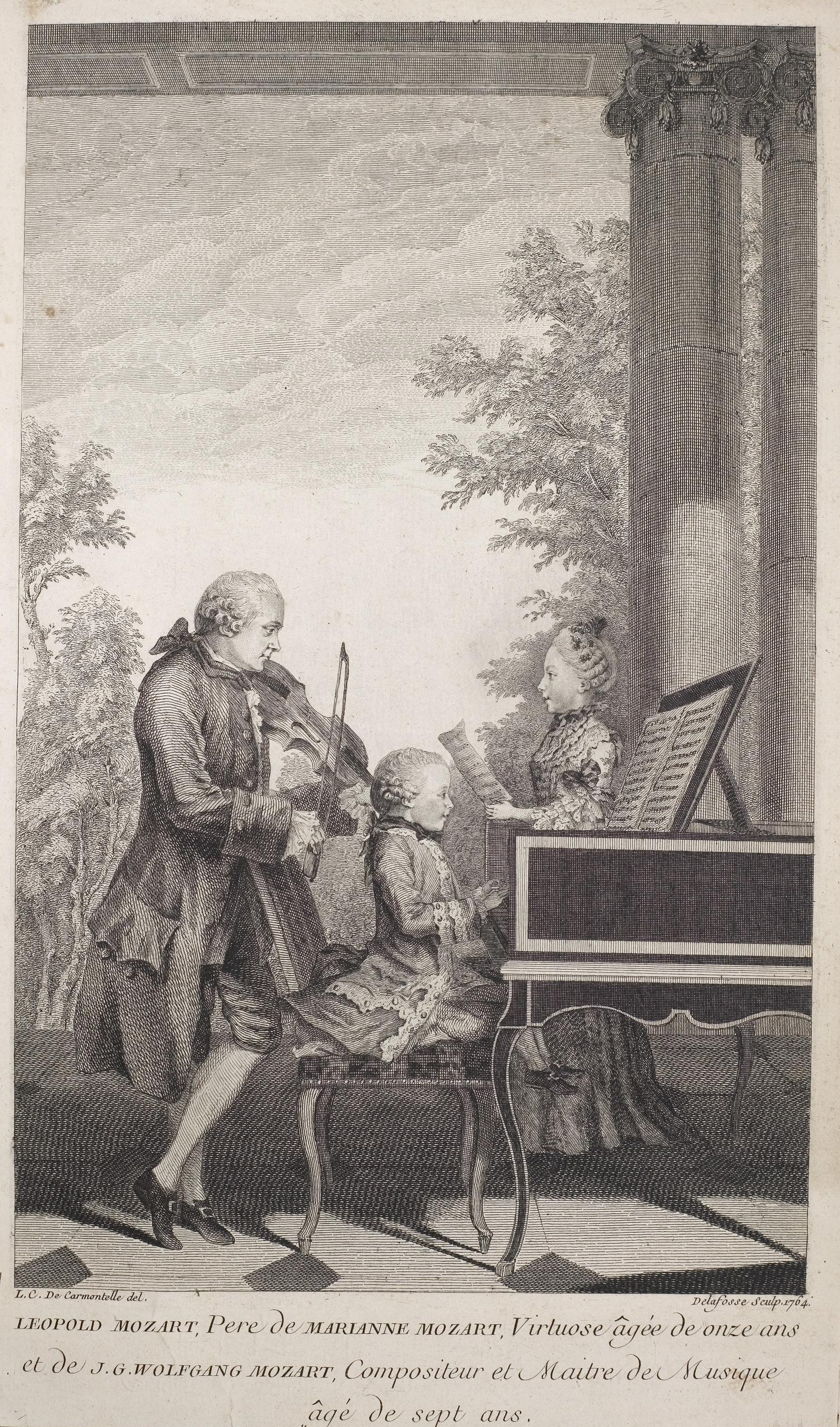
Original painting and 1764 engraving. The French caption reads, "Leopold Mozart, father of Marianne Mozart, virtuosa aged eleven years and of J. G. Wolfgang Mozart, composer and master of music, aged 7 years." (Note: "J. G." stands for "Johann Gottlieb", names Mozart bore that are little used today; see Mozart's name.)

This shows Wolfgang at the harpsichord, with Leopold behind playing the violin and Maria Anna "as if she were singing". It was painted by French artist Louis Carrogis Carmontelle during the stay of the Mozart family in Paris of 1763–64, part of their grand tour through Western Europe. It was commissioned by Friedrich Melchior, Baron von Grimm, patron of the Mozarts at the time. That the portrait is authentic cannot be doubted, since its creation is attested in a letter that Leopold Mozart wrote home to his landlord and friend Lorenz Hagenauer (1 April 1764).

An engraving is being made post haste after our portraits, which M. de Carmontelle, an amateur, has painted extremely well.

A large number of copies of the engraving were made, which Leopold used for advertising and gift purposes, and some of which he also sold. Carmontelle kept the original, whose later history is laid out in Speyer (1916). Mozart's sister was referring to the engraving when she wrote to Breitkopf & Härtel on 24 November 1799:

I am also sending you a copperplate engraving that was engraved when we were in Paris. From this you can see that my brother was a very pretty child. It was only after the smallpox [1767] that he became so disfigured: and even more so when he returned from Italy [1771], he acquired the Italian yellow colour that made him completely unrecognizable. He was a small but well-proportioned child.

It is in watercolours on paper, with subsequent copies made using griffel, sanguine, gouache, and engraving. The original is currently owned by and exhibited at the Musée Condé in the Château de Chantilly.

=== Anonymous 1770 Verona portrait ===
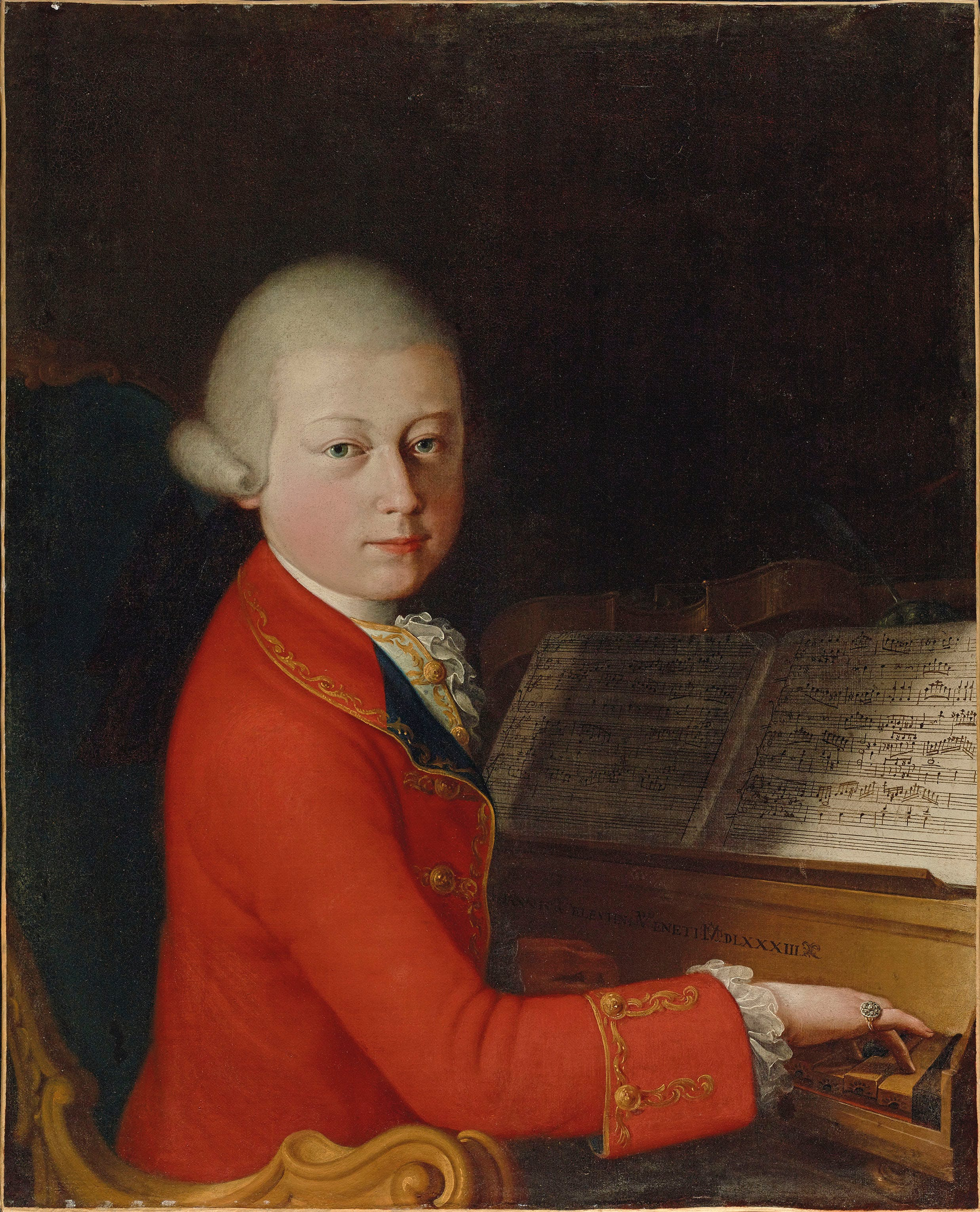
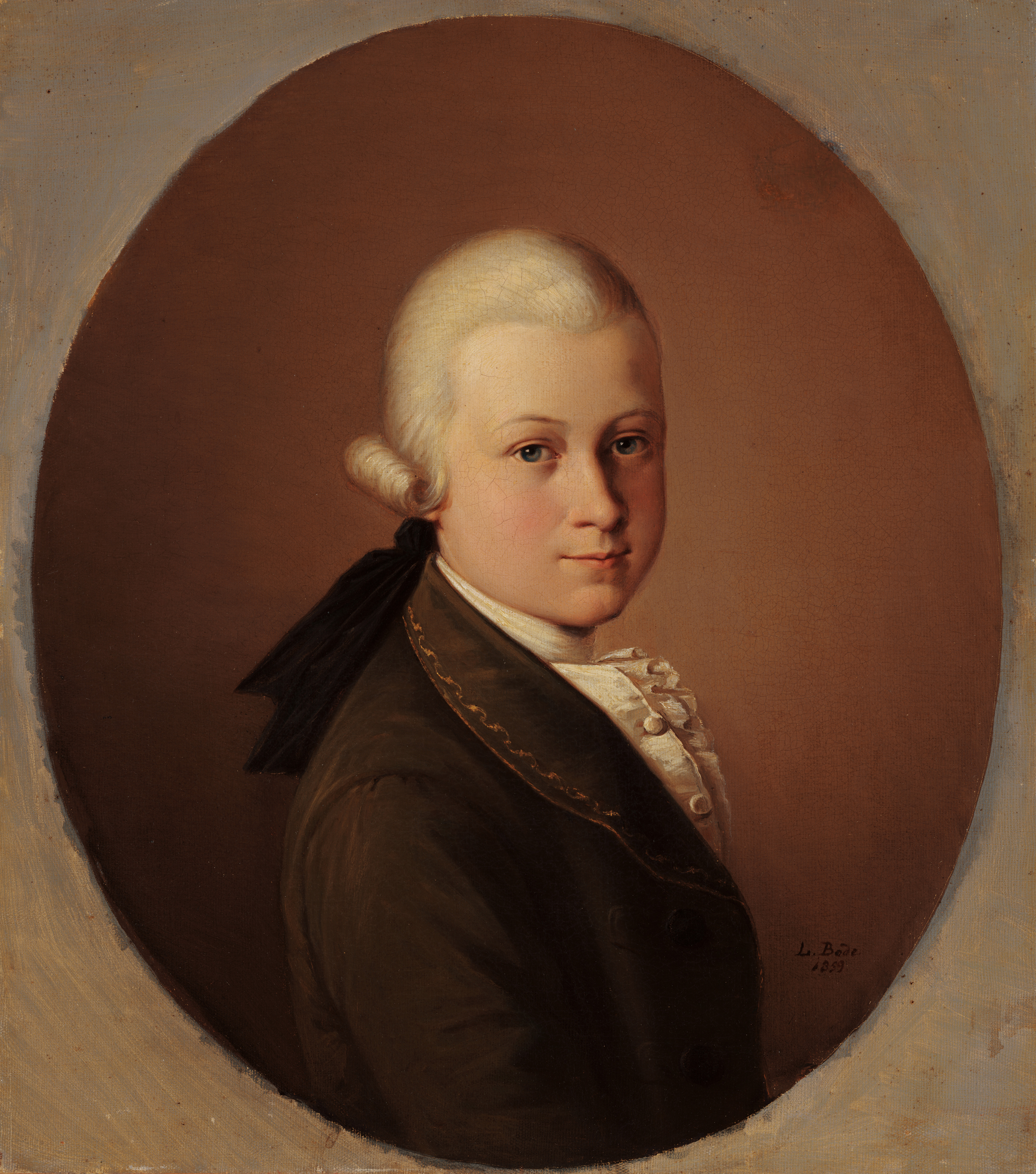
Original 1770 portrait and Bode's 1859 derivate

This shows Mozart looking at the viewer while playing the dubious "Molto allegro" in G major (K. 72a), on a harpsichord made in Venice on 1583 by Giovanni Celestius. It was painted in Verona between January 6 and 7 of 1770, commissioned by Venetian tax collector Pietro Lugiati, who also housed Mozart and his father during their stay in the city. Leopold Mozart reports on the origins of this picture in his letter to his wife on 7 January 1770. In addition, Lugiati himself also sent a letter to Anna Maria mentioning the portrait. The authorship is disputed between Saverio Dalla Rosa and Giambettino Cignaroli. Arthur Schurig considered it to be the best and most faithful portrait of Mozart as a young man.

It is oil on canvas, and was previously owned by the descendants of pianist Alfred Cortot, but it was sold to an anonymous art collector in 2019 at a Christie's auction house in Paris. Initially valued at around one million euros, the painting was finally acquired for over four million, making it not only the highest-priced portrait of Mozart, but the highest-priced artefact related to him. German painter Leopold Bode realised a reimagined copy of the portrait in 1859, by then 68 years after Mozart's death. This copy is also oil on canvas, owned and exhibited by the Mozarteum in Salzburg.

=== Anonymous 1773 miniature ===
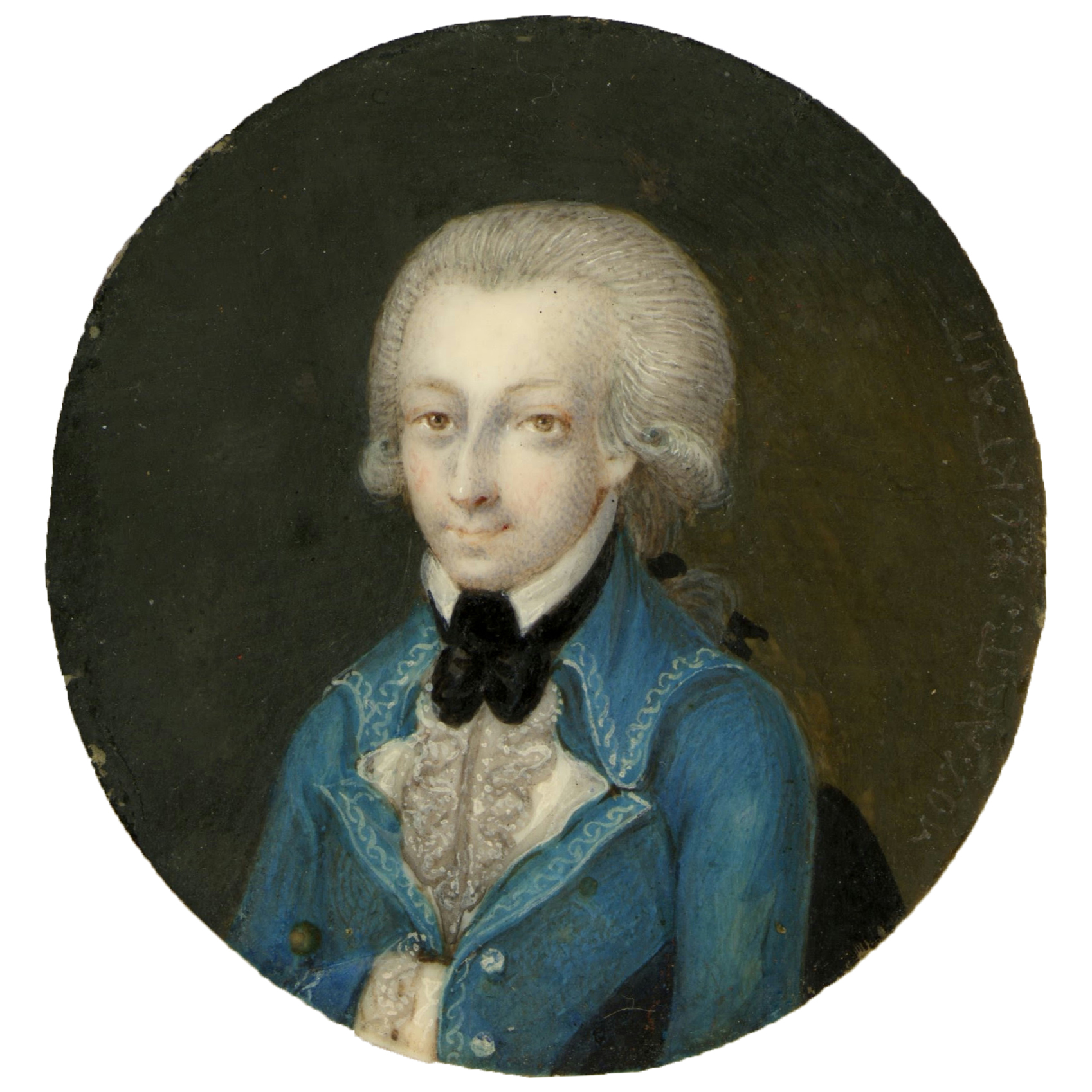

This shows the upper half of Mozart looking at the viewer. It was apparently painted in Milan in 1773, during the third journey of Mozart in Italy. It is attributed to the Austrian-Italian artist Martin Knoller, a teacher in the academy of arts of Milan at the time. Knoller was known to the Mozart family even before the first trip to Italy, according to a letter by Leopold to his wife on 17 February 1770. The portrait was in the possession of Wolfgang's sister Maria Anna Mozart, possibly given by Mozart himself. The dating of this picture derives from a letter of 2 July 1819, in which she referred to the painting. Barbara Krafft probably took it, alongside the Salzburg family portrait and Lange's miniature as a basis for her own posthumous portrait. Simon Keefe is the only notable scholar that doubts its authenticity. It is a watercolour on ivory, surrounded by a leather frame, and currently exhibited at Mozart's birthplace in Salzburg.

=== Copies of lost 1770 Bologna portrait ===
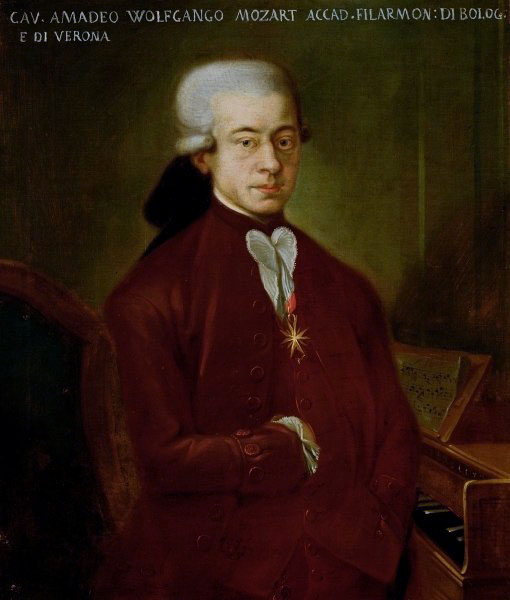
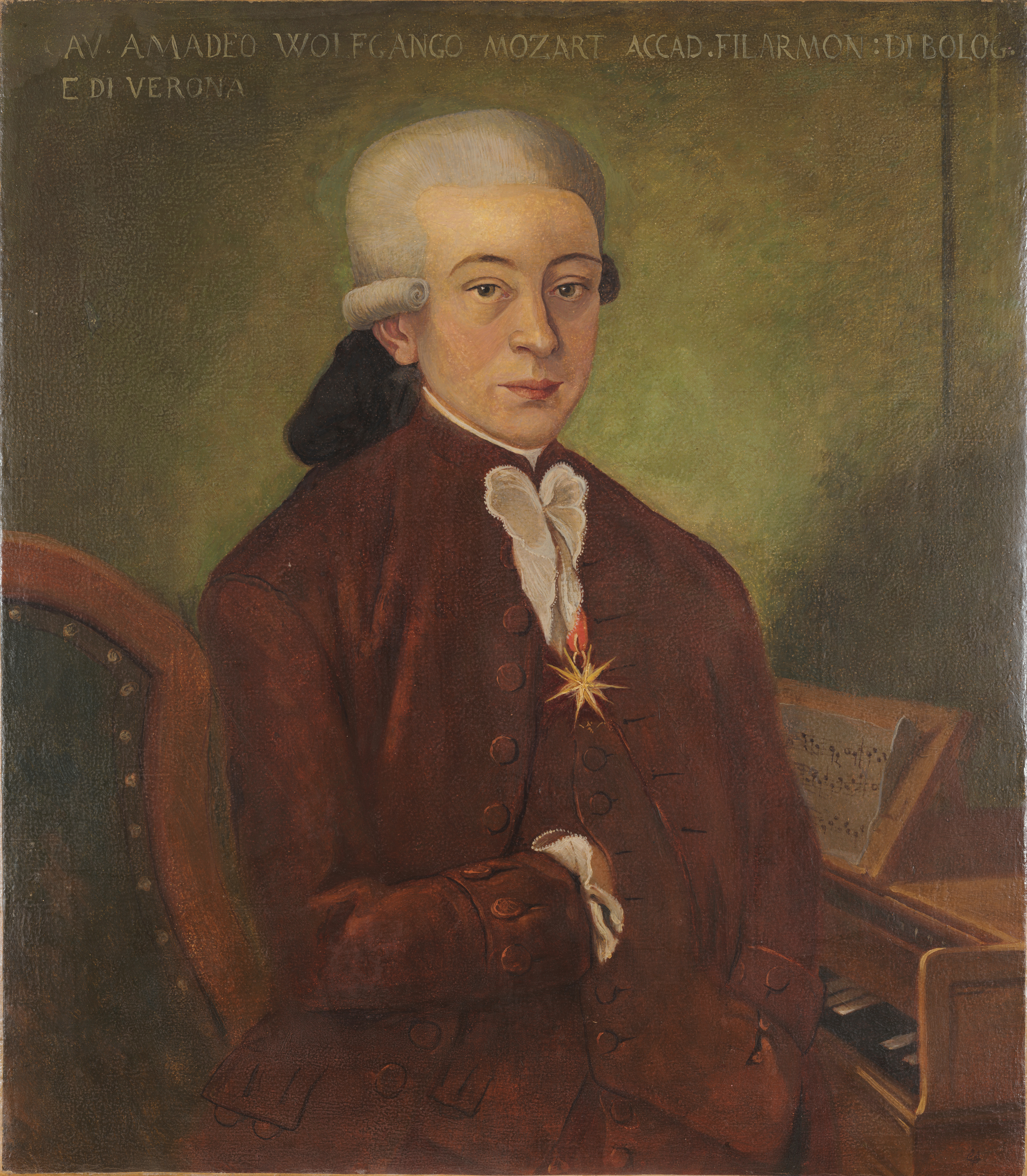
1777 copy and Nardi's 1925 copy

This represents Mozart wearing the chivalric Order of the Golden Spur, conferred on him by Pope Clement XIV on 4 July 1770. It is an anonymous copy realised in Salzburg in 1777, from a lost original dated 1770, commissioned by Giovanni Battista Martini. Wolfgang met Martini in Bologna in 1770, during his first travel to Italy. The friar instructed the young Mozart and helped him in being accepted as a member of the famous Accademia Filarmonica di Bologna, one of the most respected musical institutions in Europe at the time. The painting is mentioned by Leopold in a letter to Martini, who remarked "It has little value as a piece of art, but as to the issue of resemblance, I can assure you that it is perfect". It is attributed to Johann Nepomuk della Croce. It is oil on canvas, and is currently exhibited at the Museo internazionale e biblioteca della musica in Bologna. A copy was made in 1925 by Italian painter Antonio Maria Nardi, which is owned and exhibited by the Mozarteum in Salzburg. Another copy in watercolour was realised by John Singer Sargent in 1873, exhibited at the Fitzwilliam Museum.

=== Anonymous 1780–81 family portrait ===
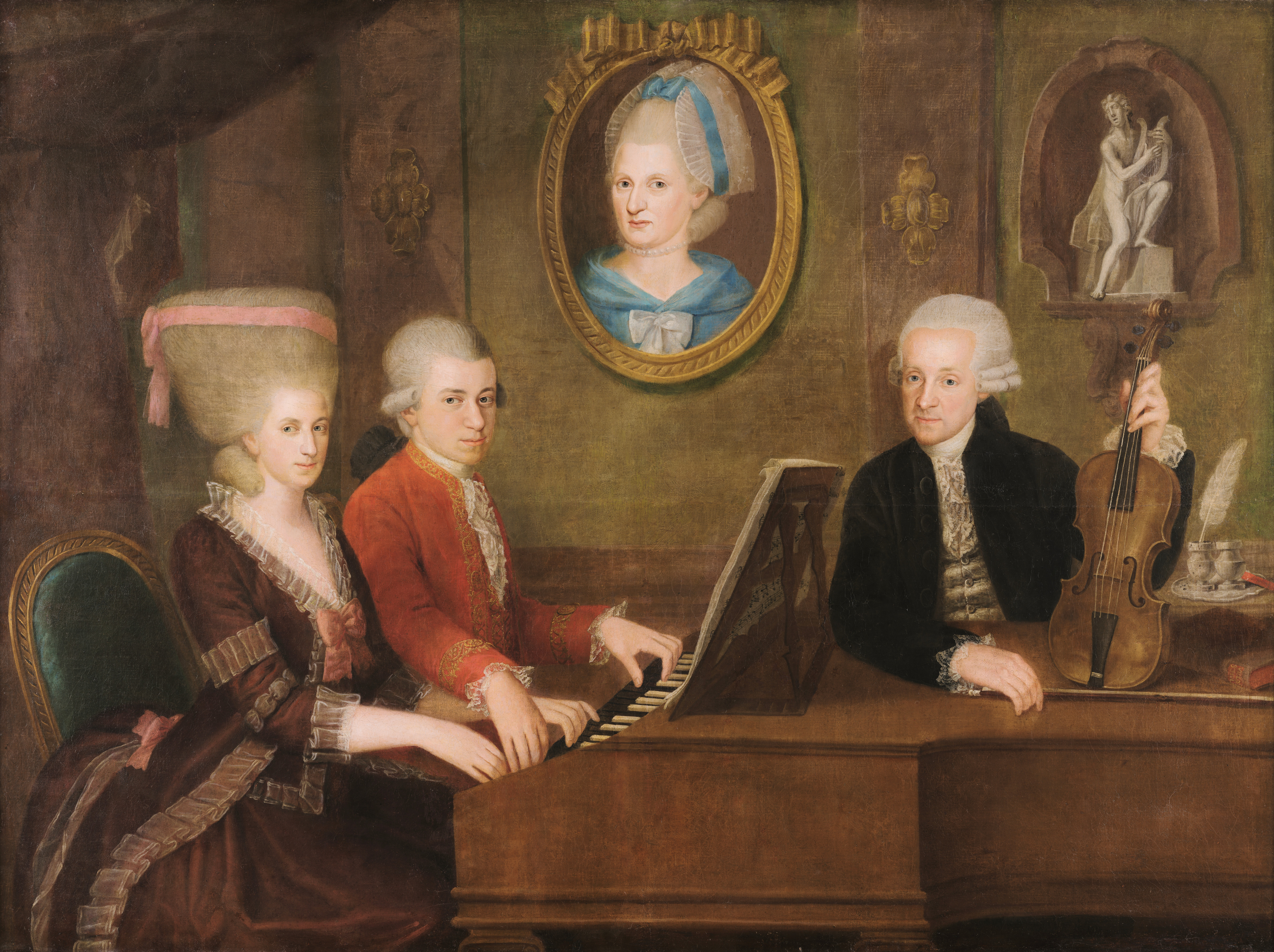
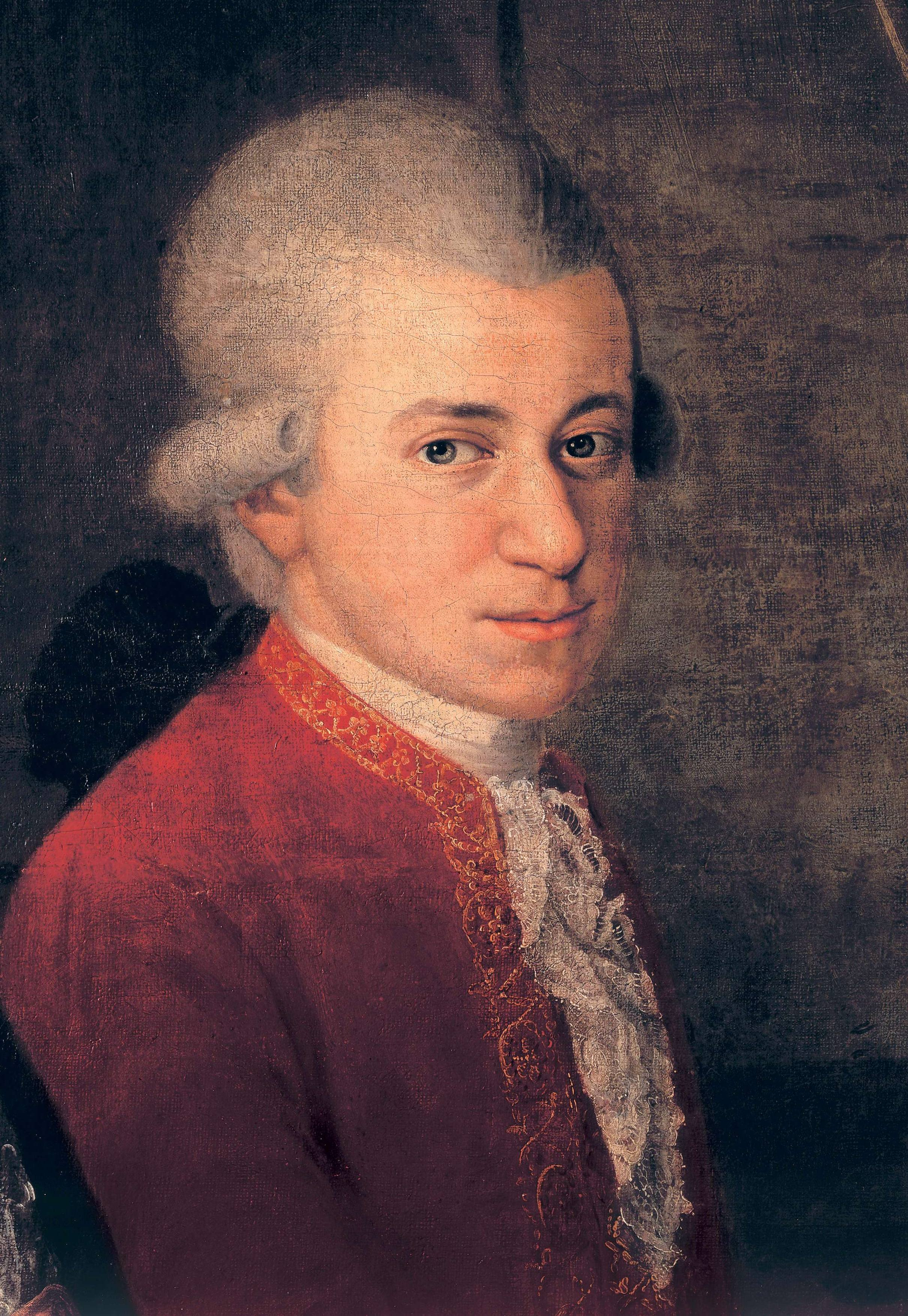
Family portrait and detail of Wolfgang

This family portrait shows Wolfgang and his sister Maria Anna playing four hands at the keyboard, with Leopold by the side holding his violin. On the wall hangs a medallion with the picture of Anna Maria Mozart, who had died suddenly in 1778 while accompanying Wolfgang in a journey to Paris. The small statue of Apollo in the background symbolizes the musical nature of the Mozart family, and the book, writing ink and a quill beside Leopold reference his influential 1755 violin playing treatise Versuch einer gründlichen Violinschule. It was painted between 1780 and 1781. It is traditionally attributed to Johann Nepomuk della Croce, a prolific Austrian painter who was active in Salzburg during the late 18th century.

The origin of this attribution comes from a 1858 engraving copy realised by Blasius Höfel, who credited della Croce as the original artist. However, no definitive evidence confirms this attribution. It is disputed by scholars such as Simon Keefe, who claims it was created in an anonymous Salzburg workshop, and George Dieter, who points to a name confusion as the origin of the supposed attribution. The painting was commissioned by Leopold, and its progress is referenced in a series of letters between Wolfgang, Maria Anna and Leopold. After Mozart's death, Barbara Krafft used this portrayal as a part of the basis for her own posthumous portrait. In 1829, when Mary and Vincent Novello met with and interviewed Constanze Mozart, her son Franz Xaver Wolfgang Mozart stated that the image of Wolfgang in this painting was one of the best likenesses of him. It is in oil on canvas, and is currently owned by the Mozarteum in Salzburg, being exhibited at Mozart's birthplace. As with the 1763 portrait and the previous example, it was widely distributed through lithographs and engravings, several of which heavily modify the faces of the sitters. (Note: Apart from the provided Höfel example, this image and this lithograph serve to illustrate this point.)

=== Lange's 1782–83 unfinished portrait ===
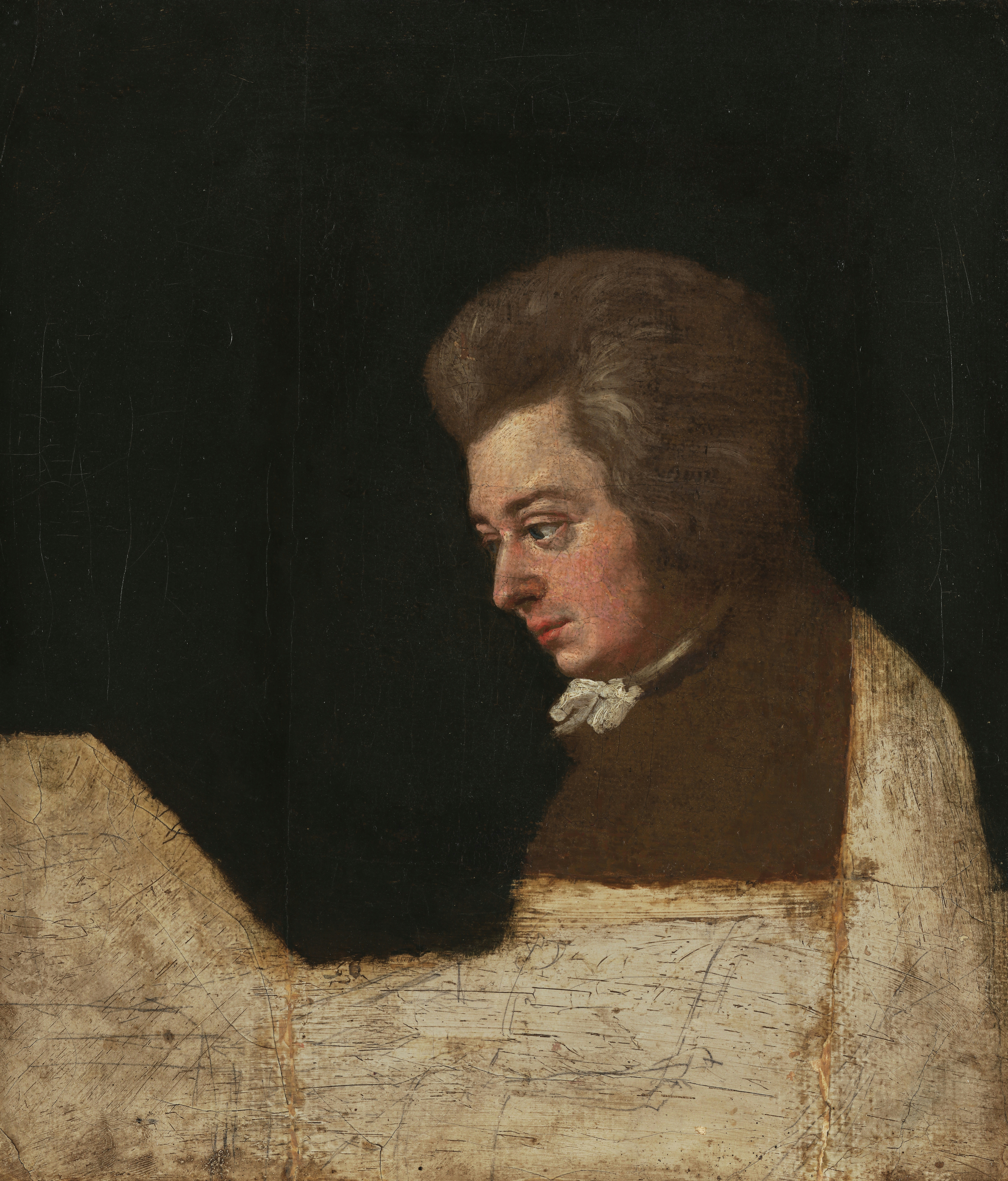
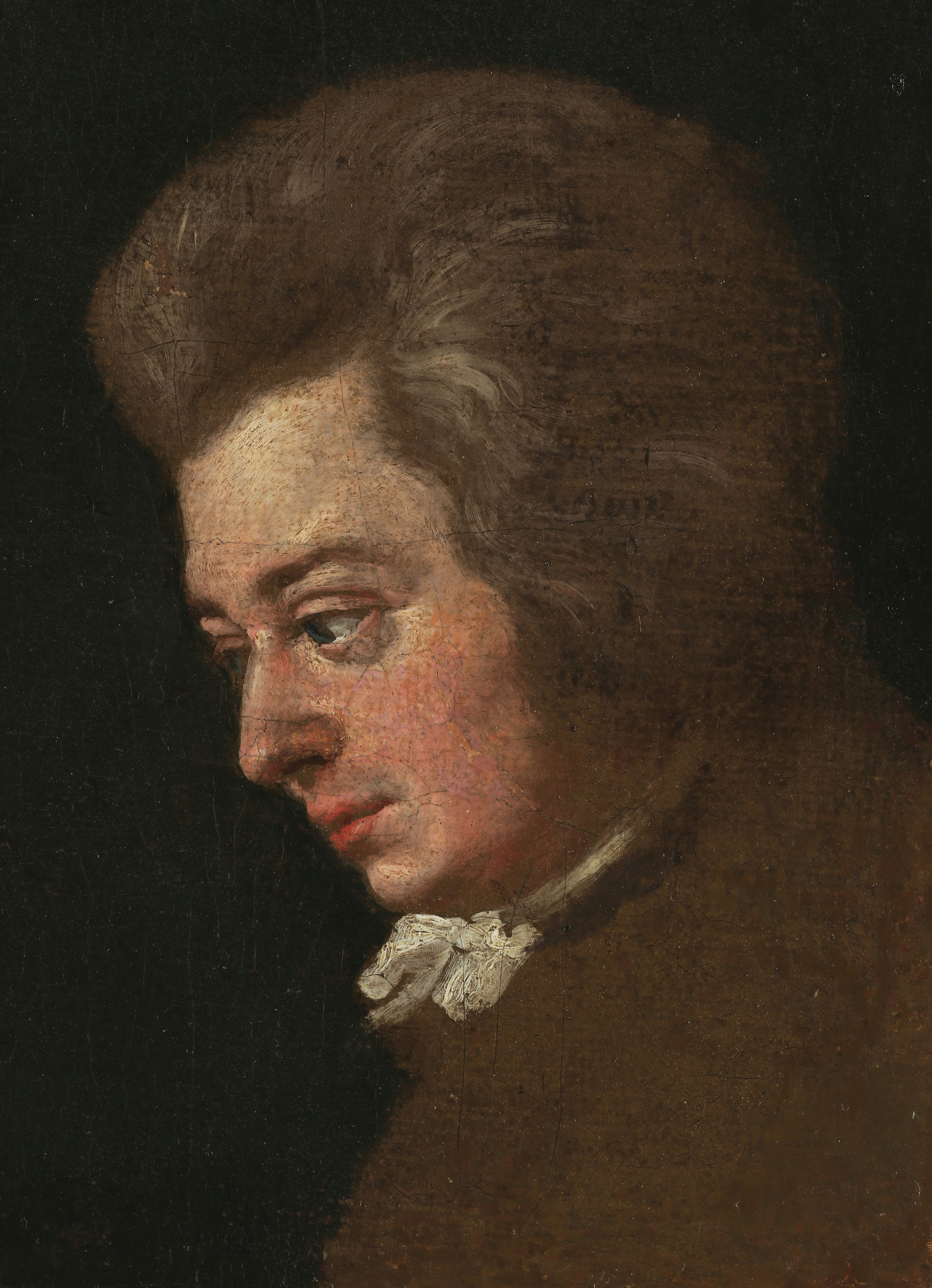
Unfinished Lange portrait and detail

This portrait shows a side profile of Mozart, without wig, from the shoulders upwards. It was painted between 1782 and 1783 by the Austrian actor and amateur painter Joseph Lange. It is oil on canvas and owned by the Mozarteum in Salzburg, being exhibited at Mozart's birthplace. Lange was Mozart's brother-in-law; in 1780 he had married Constanze's sister, the soprano Aloysia Weber, whom Mozart had courted several years earlier.

The portrait was originally completed as a miniature before being affixed to a larger canvas, probably with the intention of portraying the composer playing the keyboard, but the enlarged painting was never completed, fostering false theories that it was begun shortly before Mozart's death in 1791. The origin of the portrait as a miniature was rediscovered in 2009 by musicologist Michael Lorenz, after a very intensive restoration in the early 1960s had blurred the limits. In the spring of 1783, Mozart had the miniature sent to his father in Salzburg, alongside a similar one of Constanze, both referenced in a letter. Lange's relationship with Mozart went beyond common family ties: both were masons and went in the same social circles.

Lange played roles in Mozart's works, most notably the Musik zu einer Pantomime (K. 446/416d) and the comic singspiel Der Schauspieldirektor (K. 486). Lange also painted a small portrait of Constanze in 1782 which was later also enlarged. During Leopold Mozart's visit to Vienna in 1785, Lange drew a portrait of him as well, but this depiction was lost. In 1829, long after Mozart's death, Constanze was interviewed by Vincent and Mary Novello, and told them that Lange's portrait was "by far the best likeness of him". Schurig described it as "of little artistic value, but despite the intention to beautify it, it is not without charm".

The curators of a 2003 online exhibit at Cornell University, "Mozart and the keyboard culture of his time," offered an appreciation of the Lange portrait:

This is the most famous portrait of Mozart, in part because it is the most "romantic" and introspective depiction. Earlier portraits showed Mozart in poses—as a family member, as a Knight of the Golden Spur, in court costume. This one, had it been finished, would have shown us a contemplative Mozart at the pianoforte, natural and more "real". The fact that it remains unfinished renders it more perfect—a poignant parallel to Mozart's own life.

=== Stock's 1789 miniature ===
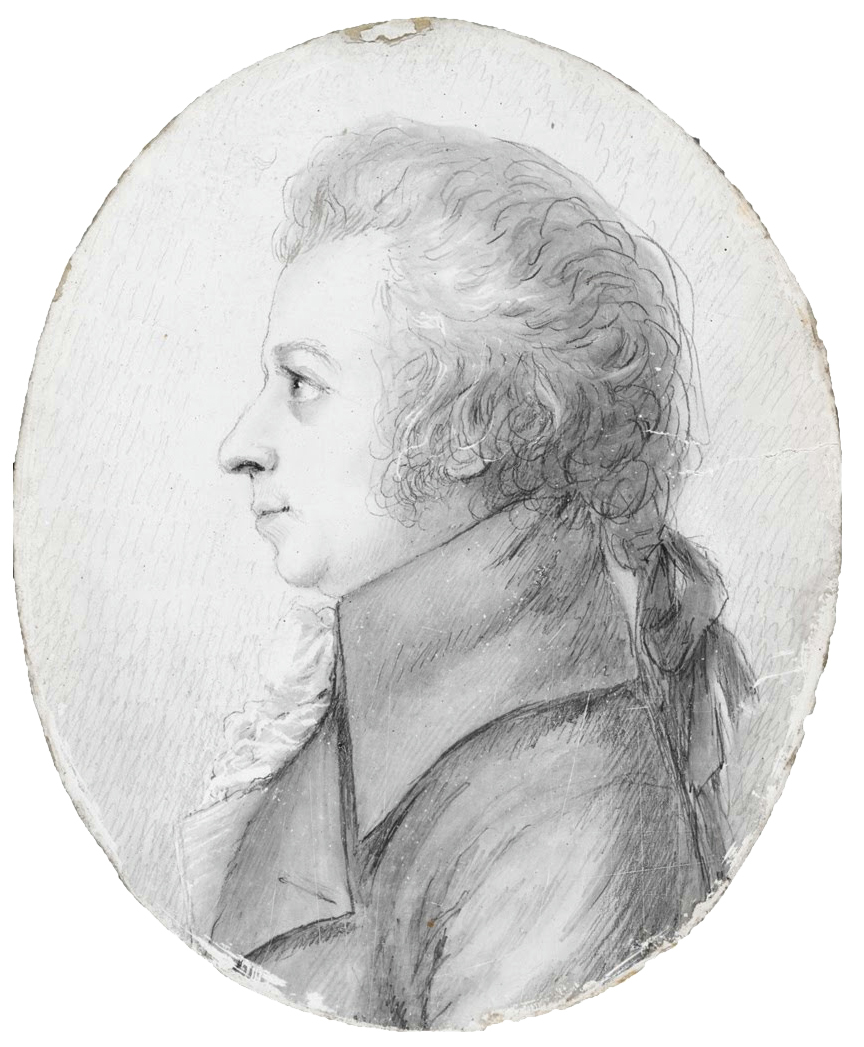

This portrait, another profile, was realised during Mozart's stay in Dresden in April 1789, while he was on a journey to Berlin. Mozart visited the family of consistorial councillor Christian Gottfried Körner, a friend of Schiller. A member of the family was Körner's sister-in-law Dora Stock, who was a talented artist and took the occasion to sketch a portrait of Mozart. It is considered the last authentic portrait of Mozart before his death in 1791. (Some doubts are cast by Cliff Eisen and other experts, most notably because of the lack of mentions in the Mozart correspondence, but it is still widely considered to be authentic.) It is in silverpoint on ivory board and is currently owned by the Mozarteum in Salzburg. The miniature was in private hands until it was acquired in 2005 by the Mozarteum for 250,000 British pounds. Due to its fragility and the potential harm of the sun, the original is protected in the museum vault, only a replica being exhibited to the public.

The weakness of chin and bulging eyes seen in this portrait may be considered in light of what one critic said about Stock: she "recoiled from vanity or exaggeration, values that are evident in her extremely competent and brutally honest portraits";

=== Krafft's posthumous 1819 portrait ===
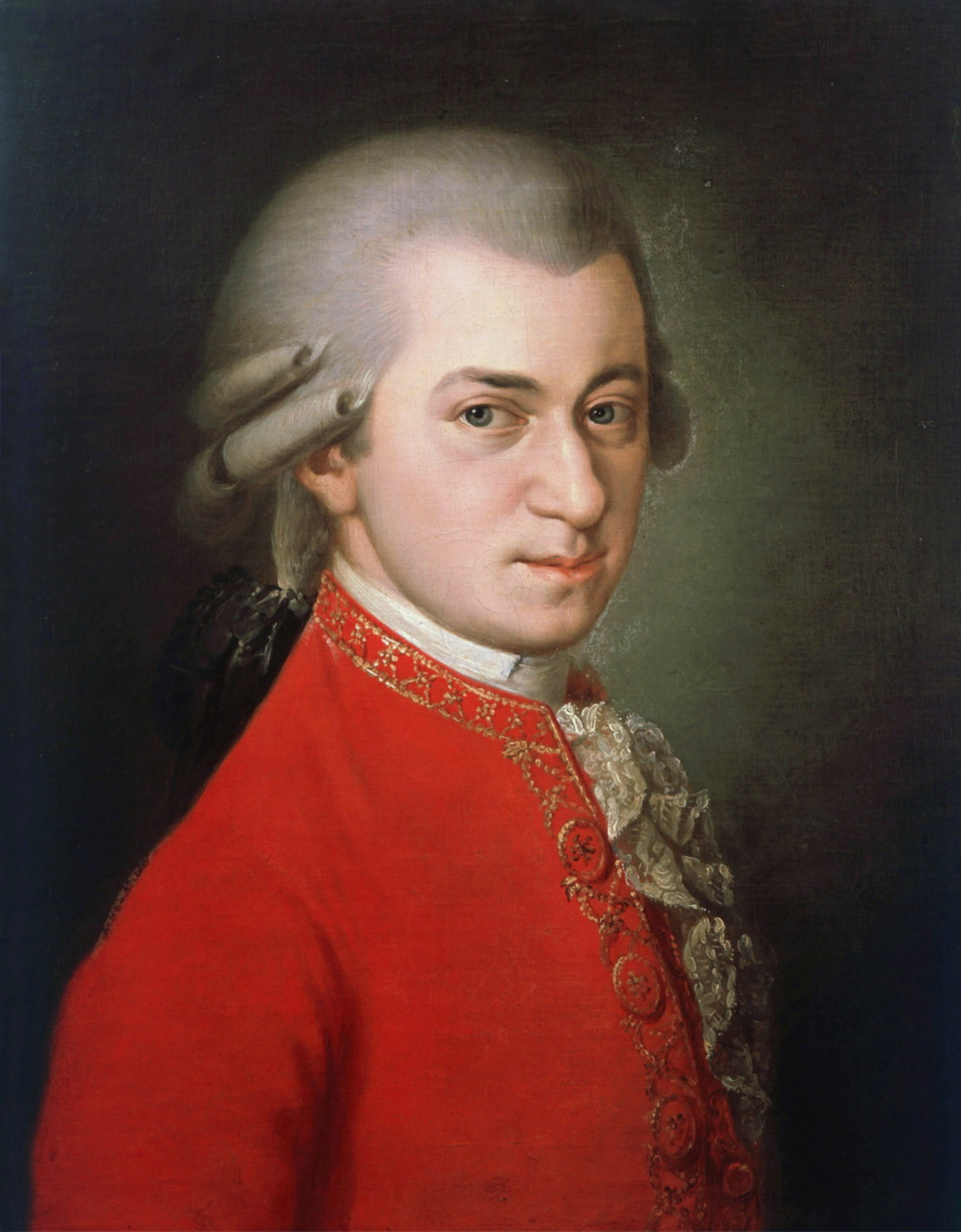
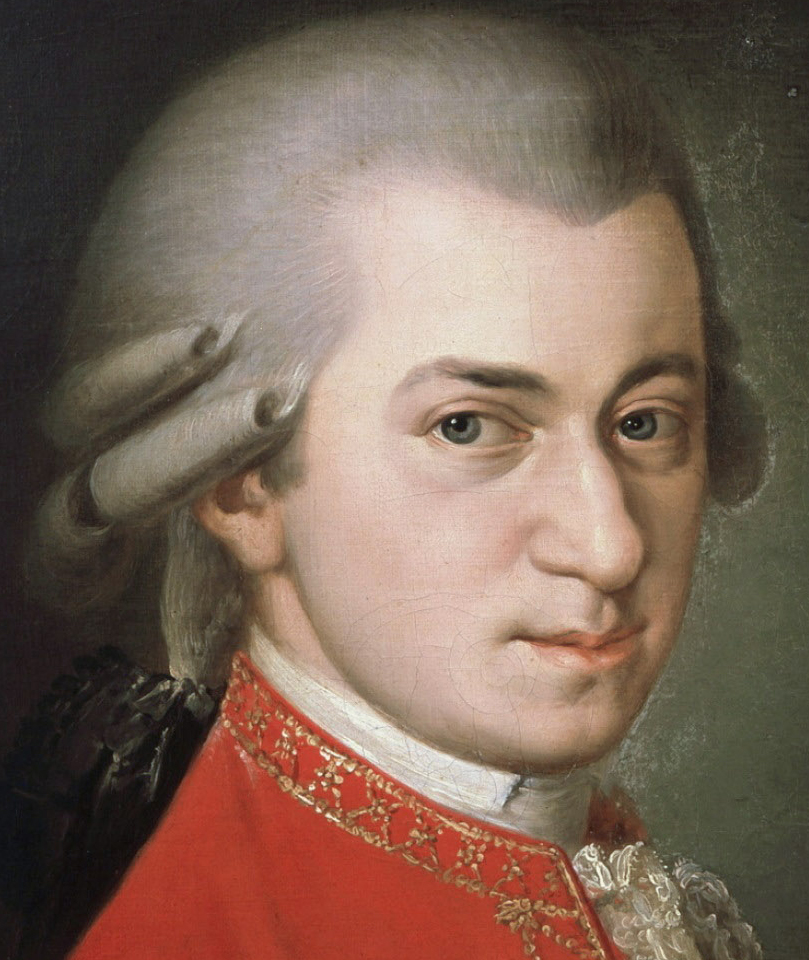
Full portrait and face detail

This is by far the most commonly reproduced and most famous portrait of Mozart, enjoying enormous popularity since the bicentenary of 1956. It was created in 1819 (28 years after Mozart's death) by the Austrian painter Barbara Krafft, commissioned by Joseph Sonnleithner for a portrait collection of well-known composers in the Gesellschaft der Musikfreunde (Society of Friends of Music) in Vienna. For the task, Krafft was supplied with three portraits of Mozart given by Maria Anna Mozart; the 1780 family portrait, the 1773 miniature that was painted in Italy and a very small miniature that was painted in 1783 and is currently lost. The family portrait model proved to be the most influential, specially in the pose and clothing. Hutchings praised the painting with the following words: "It is a tribute to Krafft's artistry that her work still remains one of the most highly valued portraits of her enigmatic subject". Thus, despite being painted posthumously, the portrait is considered to be very accurate to Mozart's real appearance, as corroborated by his sister Maria Anna. It is oil on canvas, currently still part of the collection of the Gesellschaft der Musikfreunde.

== Dubious portraits ==
=== Greuze's 1763–66 portrait ===
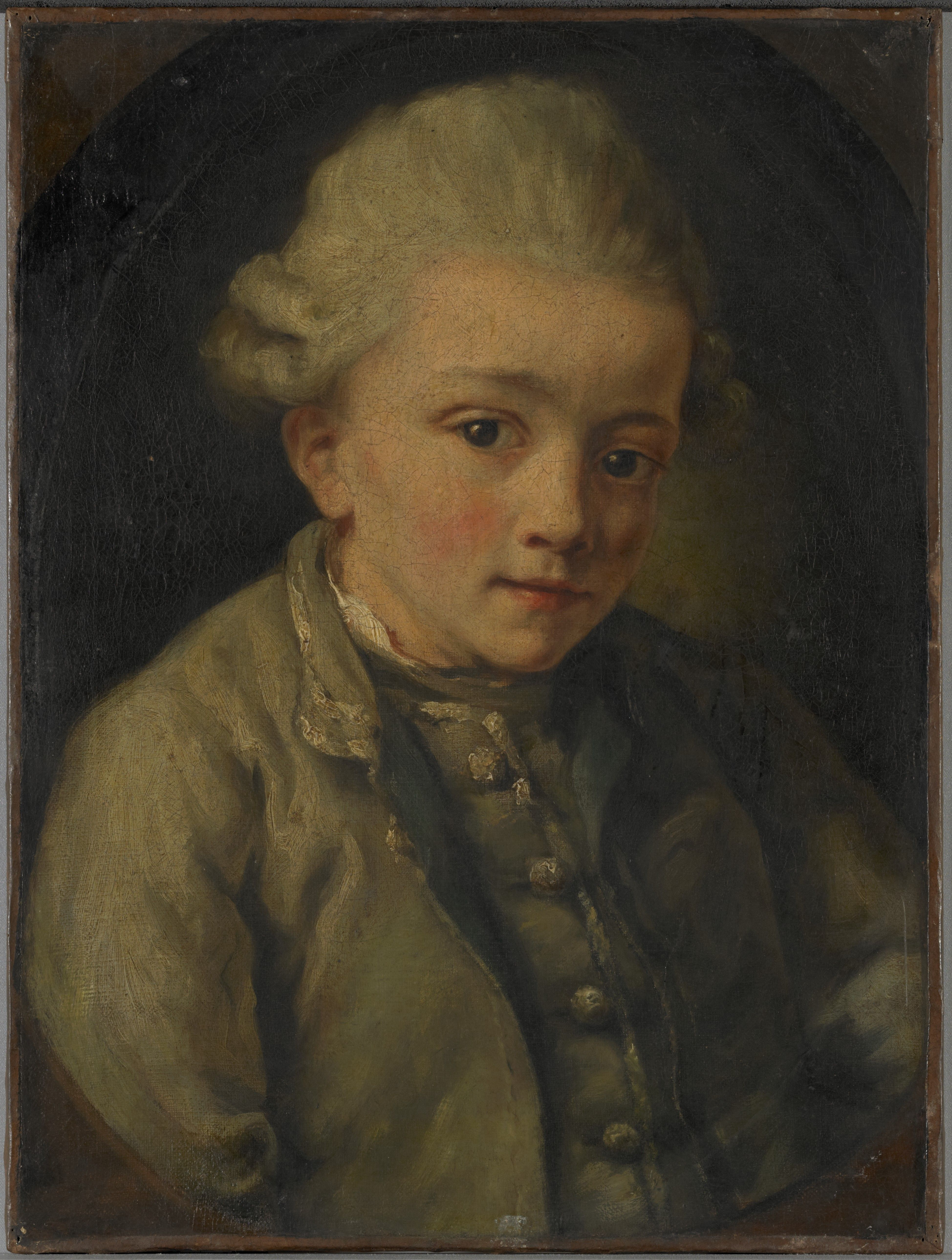
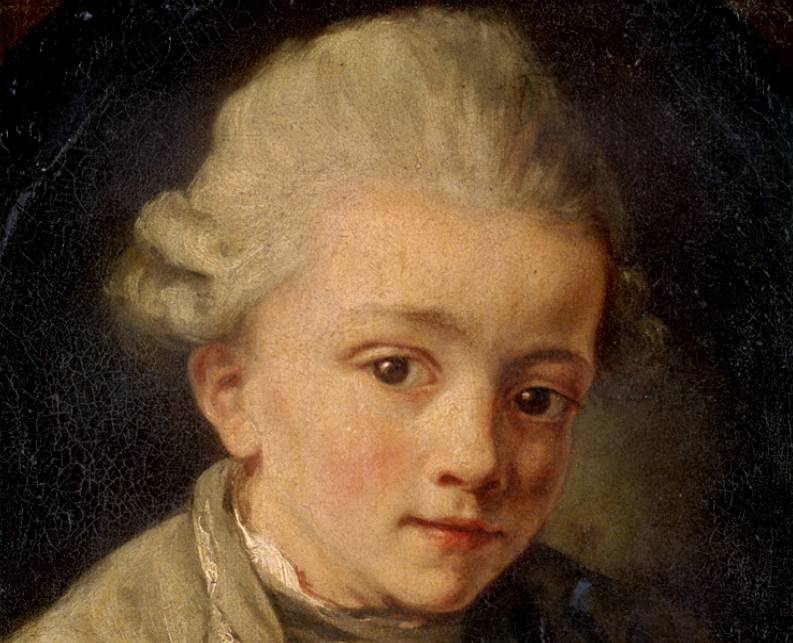
Original portrait and face detail

This supposedly shows the upper half of Mozart as painted by French artist Jean-Baptiste Greuze. Like Carmontelle's watercolour, it was apparently created during the stay of the Mozart family in Paris in 1763–64. Hutchings claimed it was instead created in Amsterdam in 1766. Before the sitter was thought to be Mozart, the picture was known as "portrait of a boy", and it was speculated that Greuze was the painter. The rediscovered portrait was first exhibited at the Mozart Museum in Salzburg, during the Mozart Festival of 1910 from July 25 to October 28. The authorship of Greuze was confirmed after his signature was found in the portrait. However, the identification of the sitter as Mozart is still debated between scholars and experts. Hutchings commented the following on the painting.

It is a masterly and beautiful painting of a child in thought, not in fine surroundings or fine clothes, but as we imagine the child Mozart might have looked when not preened for public performance. It is not really doubted that Greuze painted it but that his subject was Mozart.

We find no mention of the painting in the correspondence of the Mozart family, nor do the biographers of Mozart or Greuze mention it. Leisching and Schurig described the portrait as either inauthentic or a forgery, but this was before the signature and other details were discovered. Deutsch also considered it to be inauthentic. Composer and neurobiologist Martin Braun realised an extensive study of the portrait, analysing the facial features and comparing them with the known authentic portraits of Mozart. He came to the conclusion that not only was the painting authentic, but the model was effectively Mozart himself. This claim is supported by Mozart lecturer Daniel N. Leeson. It is oil on canvas, and is currently owned by Yale University and exhibited at Yale University Art Gallery.

=== Anonymous 1763–67 dual miniature portrait ===
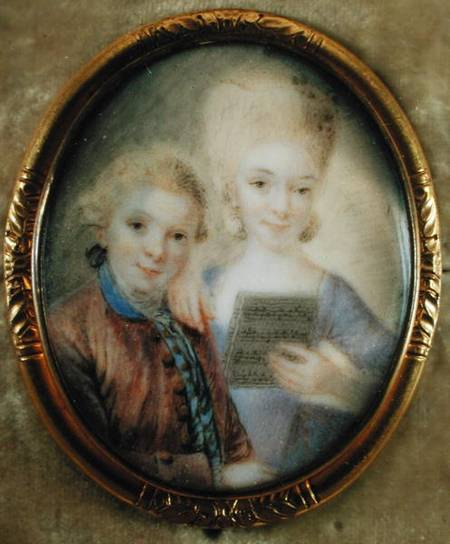

This supposedly represents Wolfgang and his sister Maria Anna, who holds a music score. It was created circa 1763–67, and attributed to Austrian court miniaturist Johann Eusebius Alphen (1741–1772). Alphen met the Mozart family on several occasions in those years in Brussels, Paris and Vienna. Arthur Schurig included the miniature in his list of inauthentic Mozart portraits, but without bringing any concrete evidence as of why. On the other hand, Canadian musicologist and Mozart expert Cliff Eisen concluded that the miniature was authentic. However, it is still considered doubtful by most experts. It is watercolour and opaque or poster paint on ivory, and currently owned by the Mozarteum in Salzburg.

=== Anonymous 1767–68 portrait ===
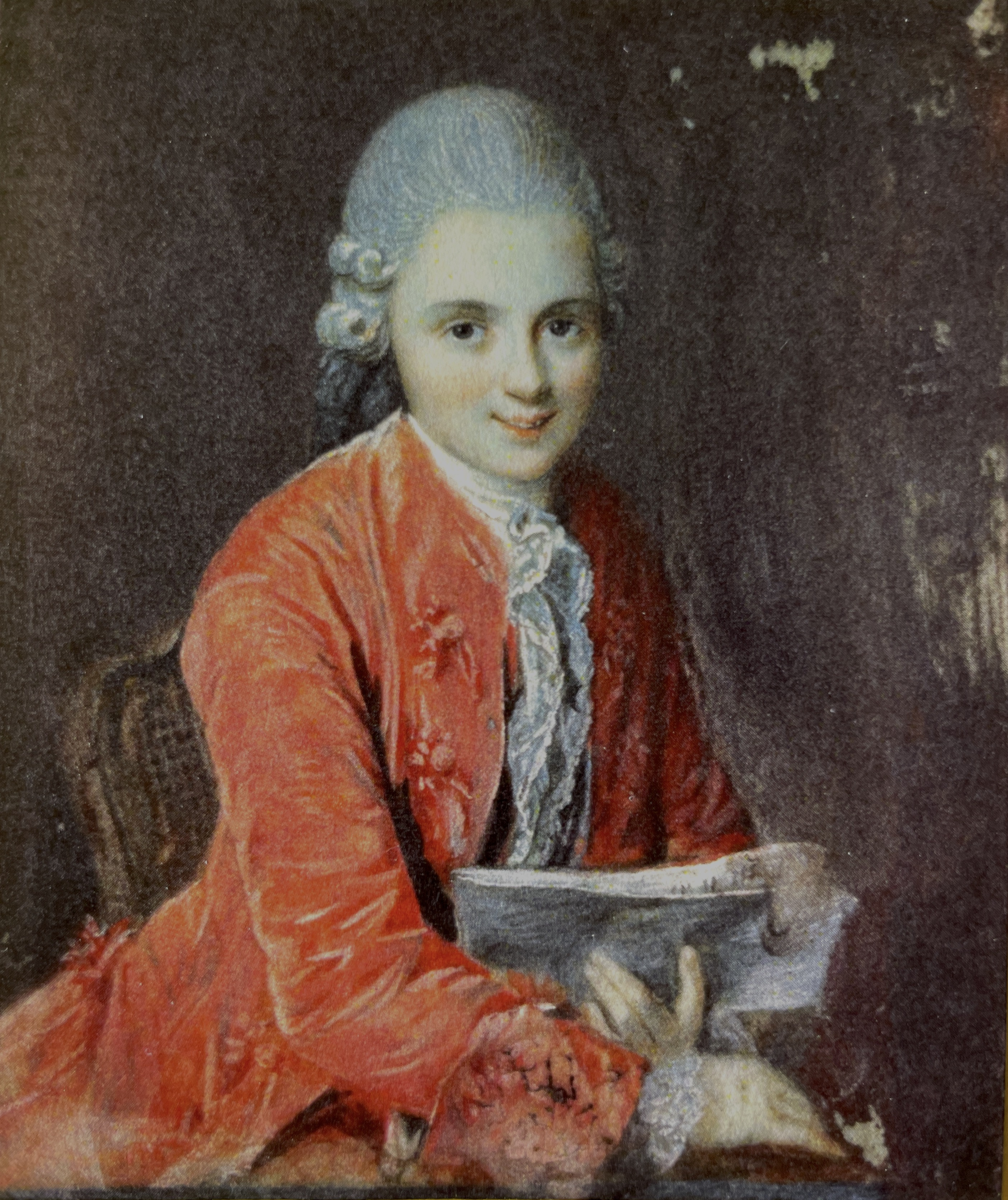

This supposedly shows Mozart holding a score while looking at the viewer. It was apparently painted circa 1767–68 in Vienna, authorship being disputed between Johann Eusebius Alphen and Pietro Antonio Lorenzoni. According to Mozart expert Manfred Schmid, the painting was in possession of the Hagenauer family (whose members were close to the Mozart family and frequently appear in their correspondence), Their Mozart collection was sold circa 1920 in Cologne. However, lack of provenance for the painting has kept experts and researchers divided as to its authentication. Mozart musicologist Rudolph Angermüller expressed positive views on it. The technique used is unknown. It is currently owned and displayed at the Mozarteum in Salzburg.

=== Anonymous 1770 Florence portrait ===
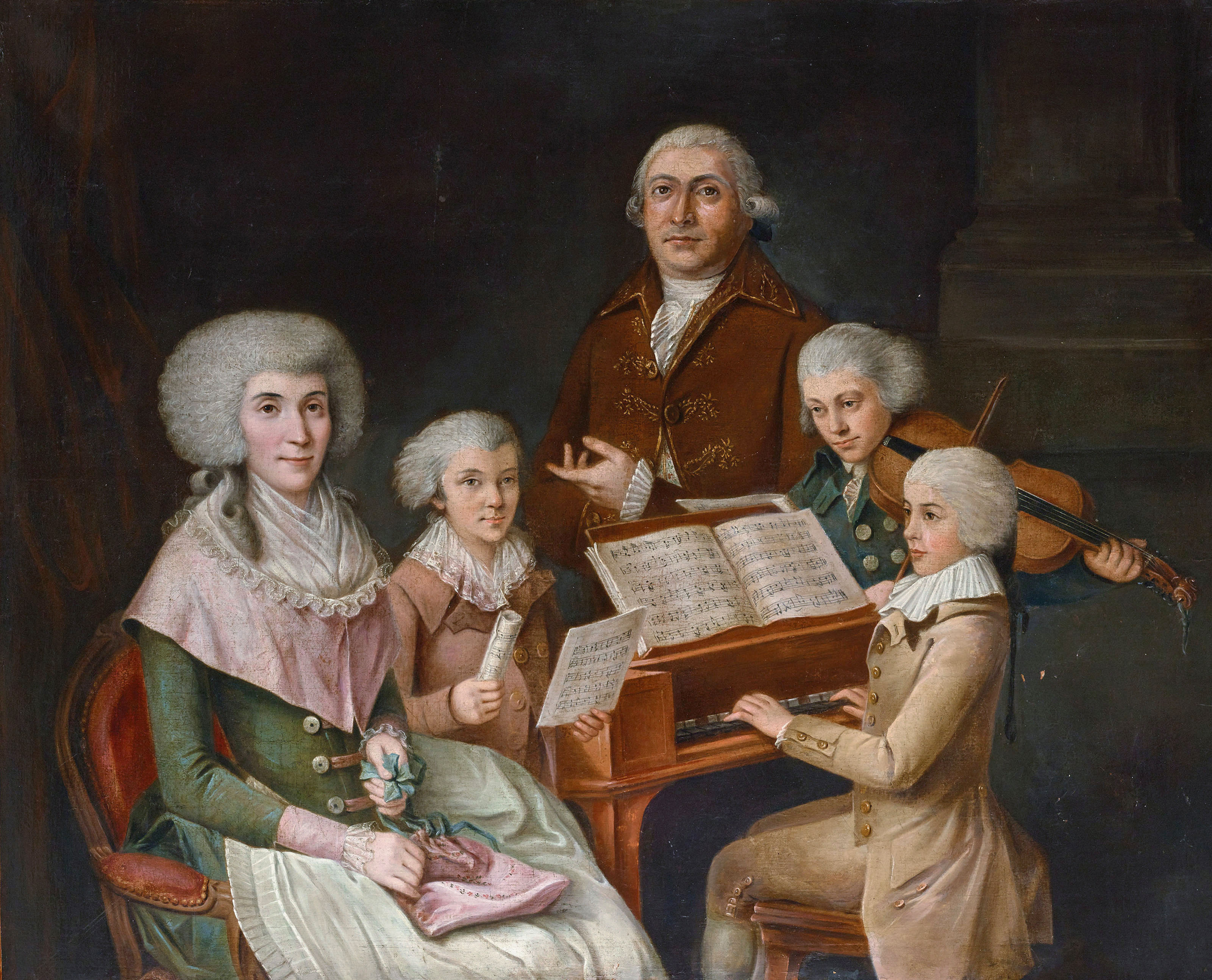

This apparently shows Mozart at the keyboard, surrounded by the Gavard des Pivets family and Thomas Linley playing the violin. It was supposedly painted in 1770 in Florence, where Leopold and Wolfgang encountered violinist Pietro Nardini, whom they had met at the start of their grand tour of Europe. However, no firm authorship of any artist has yet been established. Giuseppe Maria Gavard des Pivets was the finance administrator of the court of Grand Duke of Tuscany Leopoldo I (later Holy Roman Emperor Leopold II). Wolfgang also met Thomas Linley, an English violin prodigy and a pupil of Nardini. The two formed a close friendship, making music and playing together "not as boys but as men", as Leopold remarked. This is oil on canvas was previously owned by the pianist Alfred Cortot, who also owned several other Mozart portraits, including the 1770 painting attributed to Cignaroli. It was acquired by an American collector in 2019.

=== Delahaye's 1772 portrait ===
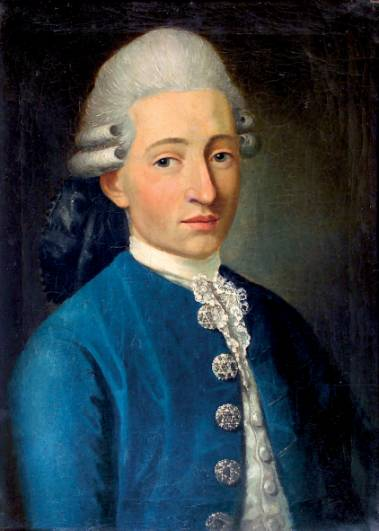
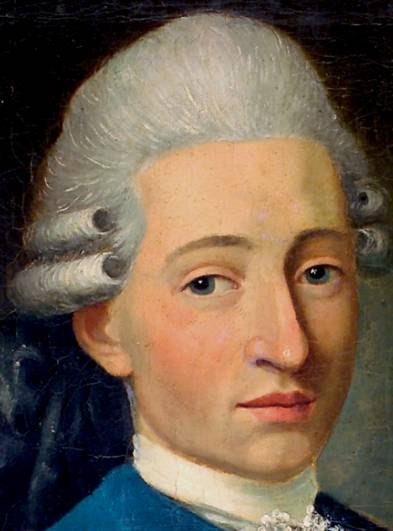
Original portrait and face detail

This apparently shows the upper half of Mozart. It is dated 1772 and executed by French painter Jean-Baptiste Delahaye on the reverse of the canvas. However, it is heavily disputed whether the portrayed is actually Mozart. Martin Braun analyzed and compared the painting with authentic portraits (Bologna and Salzburg family paintings), and concluded that the facial elements of the sitter matched Mozart's. Despite this, it is still considered inauthentic by several Mozart experts. No references to the portrait appear in the Mozart correspondence, nor do external facts confirm the attribution. The painting was previously known as "Portrait of a Young Man", bringing the possibility that the sitter was claimed to be Mozart long after the artwork was made. It is oil on canvas; its earliest known owner was the writer Duchess Mechtilde Christiane Maria Lichnowsky, née Countess von und zu Arco-Zinneberg. She was a descendant of the Arco and Lichnowsky families, which had close ties to the Mozarts, and possibly acquired the portrait. It is currently privately owned after a January 2006 auction in Salzburg.

=== Anonymous 1773–75 portrait ===
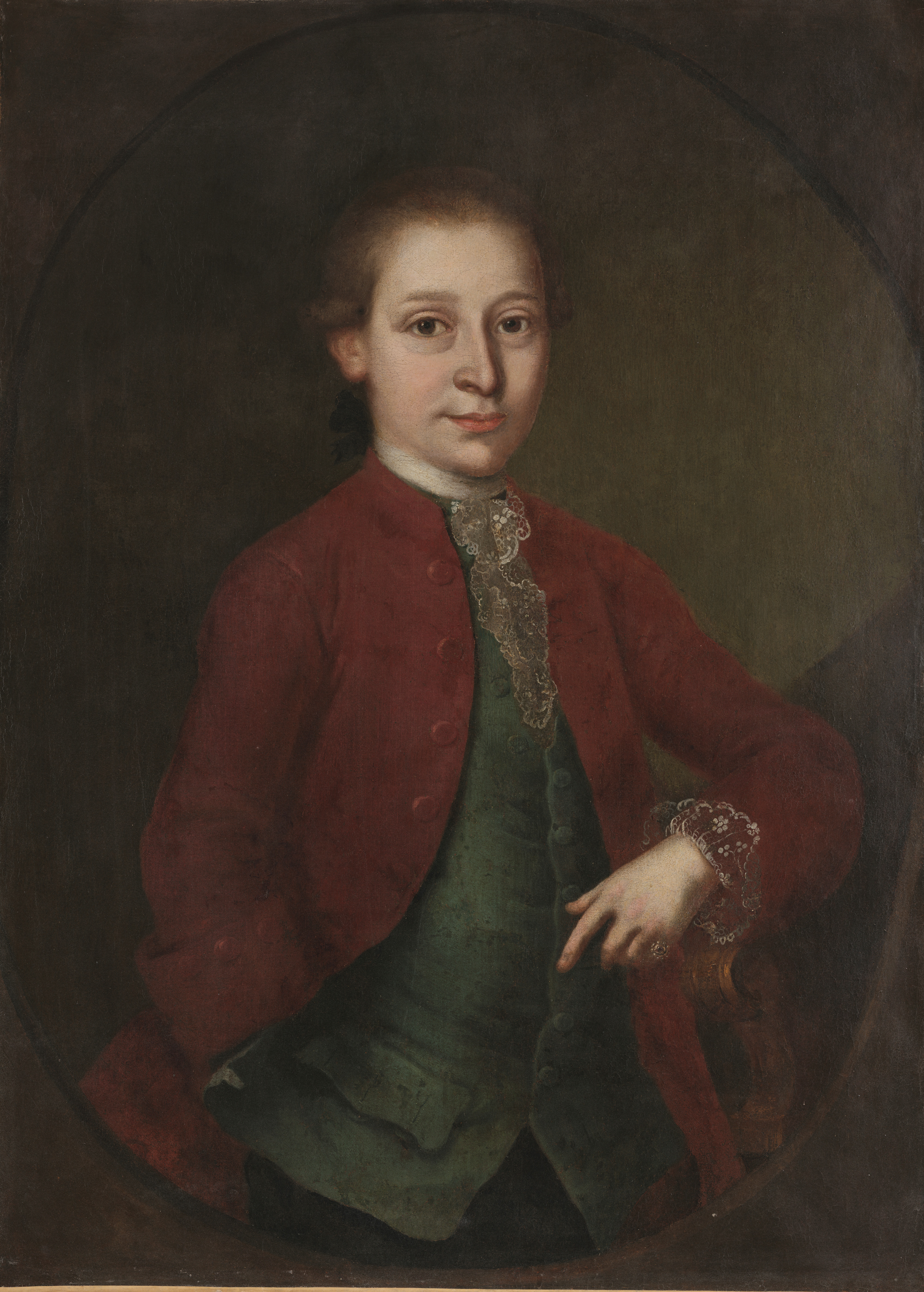

This apparently shows Mozart looking at the viewer while wearing a valuable diamond ring, which he received as a gift from Empress Maria Theresa on 3 October 1762. It is dated circa 1773–75, and no firm authorship of any artist has yet been established. Schurig initially considered it to be inauthentic, but later changed his mind, remarking on the similarity of the facial features when compared with the authentic paintings. Despite this, it is still considered doubtful due to a lack of research and consensus among experts. It is oil on canvas, currently owned and exhibited at the Mozarteum in Salzburg.

=== Anonymous 1780 miniature ===
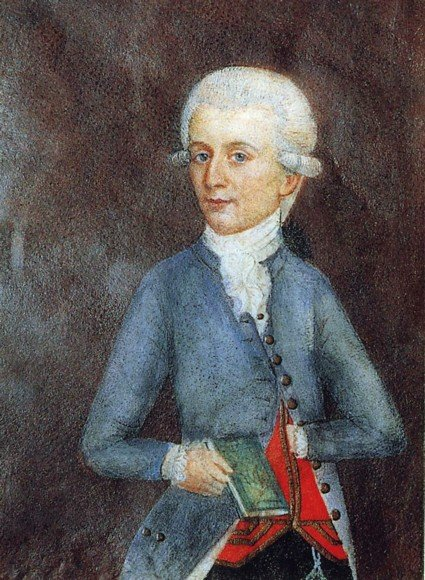

This supposedly shows Mozart, looking at the viewer while holding a book with a monogram of the letters "W.A.M". It is dated circa 1780 and attributed to Johann Nepomuk della Croce. It's considered dubious and is not mentioned in the correspondence of the family. Schurig included it in his list of inauthentic portraits, pointing at physical differences in the ears when compared with the authentic paintings. Hutchings brought the possibility that the painting may have been realised as a sketch for a bust portrait, and that if the attribution is correct, only the head may have been painted by Della Croce. It is a mixture of gouache and tempera on parchment, and currently owned by the Vienna Museum.

=== Anonymous 1783 miniature ===
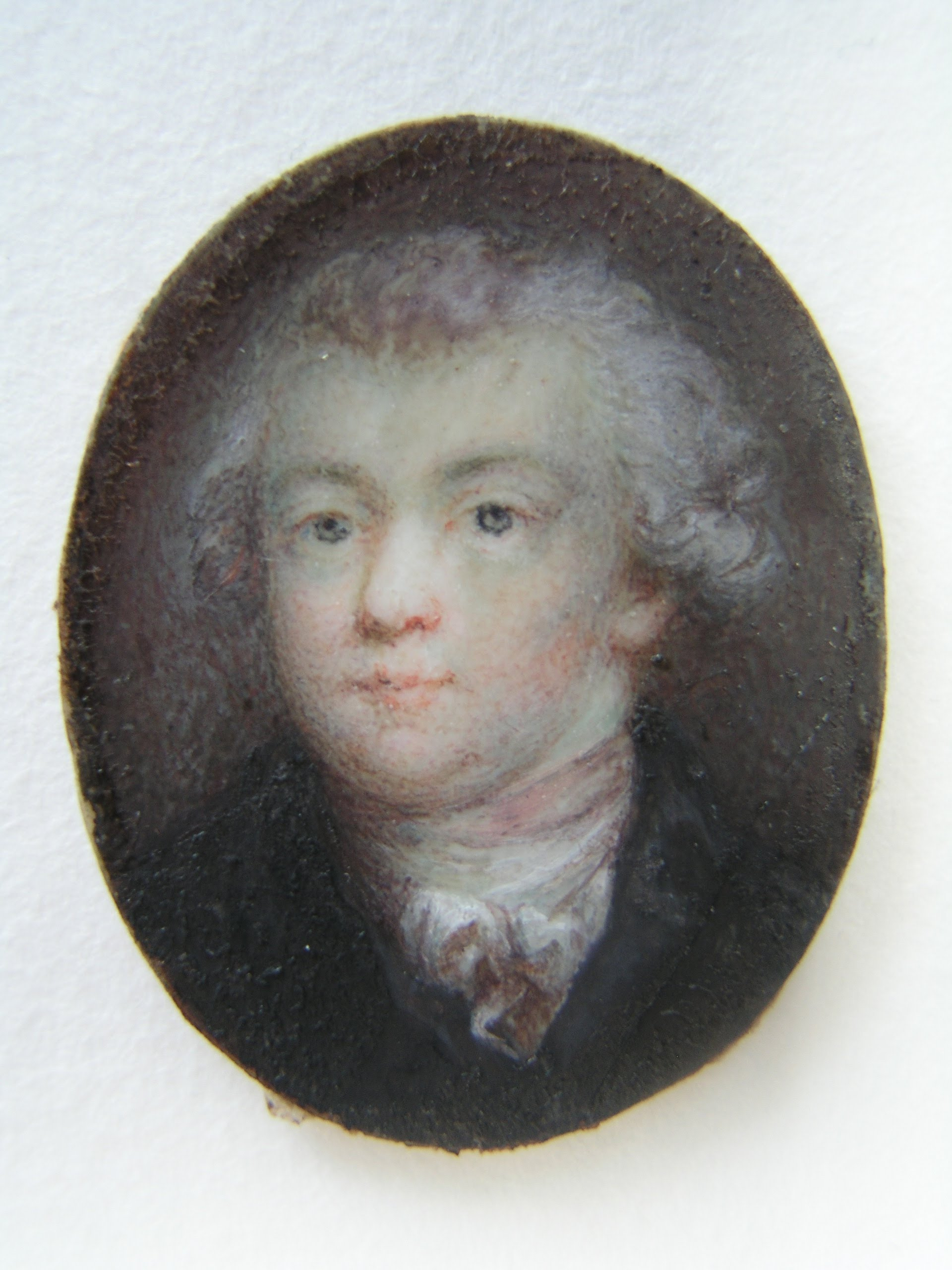
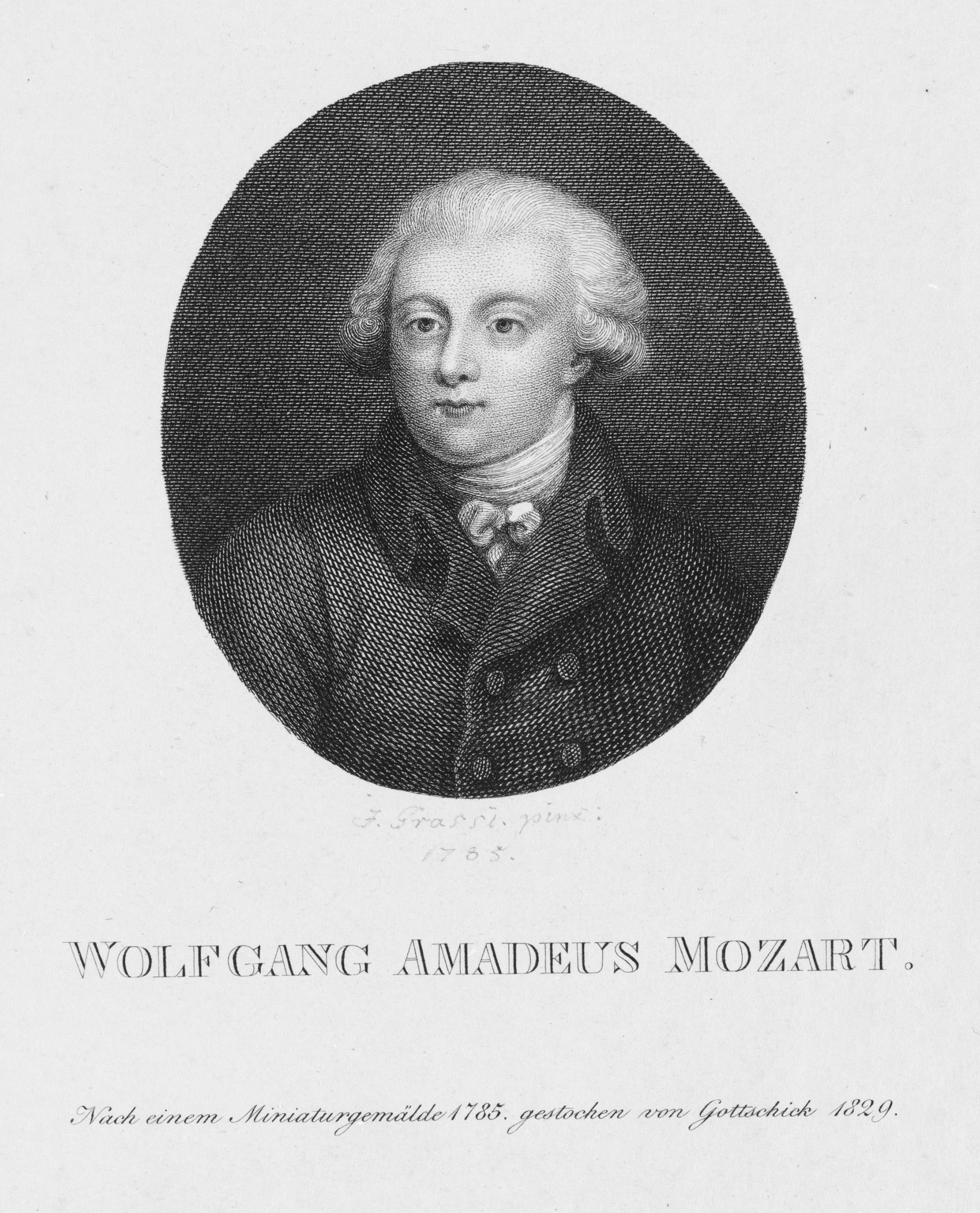
Grassi's 1783 miniature and Gottschick 1829 engraving

It shows Mozart looking directly at the viewer while wearing no wig. It is attributed to the Austrian artist Josef Grassi, with the inscription "Joh: Mozart, 1783" (Note: The inscription refers to Mozart's actual first name: Johannes. He was baptized as Johannes Chrysostomus Wolfgangus Theophilus Mozart) but no signature from the artist. Grassi and Mozart both lived in Vienna after the latter's arrival in 1781, and the painter played a role in a pantomime with Mozart's music (Musik zu einer Pantomime K. 446/416d), which is mentioned in a letter from Wolfgang to Leopold dated 12 March 1783. However, no direct testimony references the creation of a portrait by Grassi.

According to the testimony of Antonie Vogel, great-niece of Josef's brother the sculptor Anton Grassi, the latter received a tobacco snuffbox from Mozart. After Anton's death in December 1807, his widow gave the box to his brother Josef, who inserted the portrait at some point. A copper engraving was realised in Dresden on 1829 by Johan Gottschick, who was a disciple of Josef Grassi during the latter's stay in the city. As the original was thought to be lost until 1956, this copy was the only known remnant from which came the date and the Grassi attribution. This caused suspicion on its authenticity by scholars such as Zenger and Hutchings, who considered it dubious.

It was authenticated by the Mozarteum in Salzburg in January 2013, according to Cristoph Grosspietch, through examinations of the portrait and historical records of the era. News quickly spread of the identification on the media. Michael Lorenz replied to the announcement with much scepticism, pointing at several inconsistencies and mistakes realised in the research. He specially insisted that there was no proof the sitter was actually Mozart, and neither was for the Grassi attribution. In addition, both Richard Bauer and Lorenz doubted the Grassi attribution on stylistic grounds and lack of direct evidence. It is a watercolour on ivory, currently owned by the Mozarteum in Salzburg.

=== Anonymous 1783–85 portrait ===
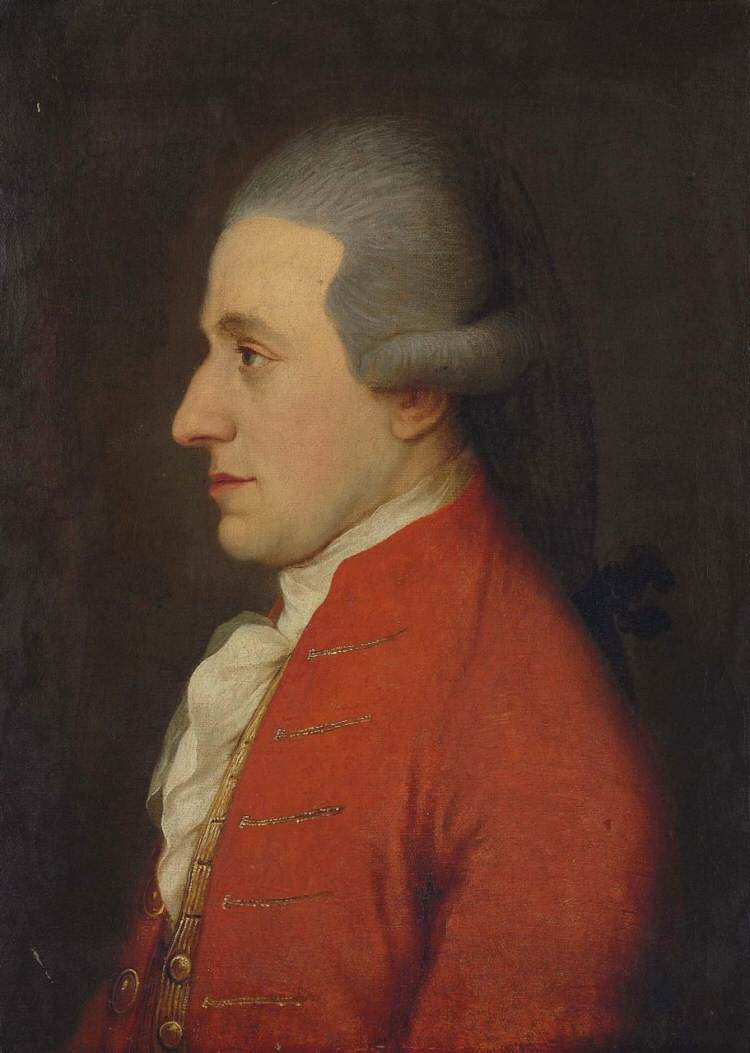

The portrait shows the upper half of the sitter in profile. It is dated circa 1783–85 and attributed to the Austrian artist Joseph Hickel, who worked at the Austrian Imperial Court. The painting is said to have been in the possession of the Hagenauer family, which had strong ties with the Mozarts. It was Mozart scholar Daniel N. Leeson the first to indicate that the sitter may be Mozart, after which several other experts joined in the investigation. The portrait is considered authentic by the Mozarteum in Salzburg, supported by the opinions of Cliff Eisen, Simon Keefe and Martin Braun.

Eisen suggested the red coat of the painting matched the description of a coat Mozart desired and obtained, as documented in two letters of the period. Braun carried out an biometric study of the painting, comparing it with the images considered authentic and analysing the facial features; concluding that the Hagenauer portrait is authentic. A skeptic has been Michael Lorenz, who gives reason to doubt that the portrait originates with the Hagenauer family. In terms of proximity to Mozart in space and time, Hickel qualifies well as a possible portraitist. The Portrait Society describes his career as follows:

From 1756, he studied at the Academy of Fine Arts in Vienna. Commissioned by Empress Maria Theresa, he travelled to Italy in 1768 to paint portraits of members of the Habsburg family in Milan, Parma and Florence. ... In 1772, Hickel became deputy director of the Imperial Art Gallery, where his duties, among others, included the restoration of artworks. In 1776, he was appointed court painter and became a member of the Academy in Vienna. Hickel was one of the most sought-after portraitists of his time in Vienna. In addition to members of the court, he also painted noblemen and actors of the Burgtheater. It is estimated that Hickel painted about 3000 portraits.

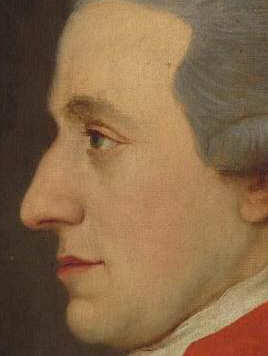
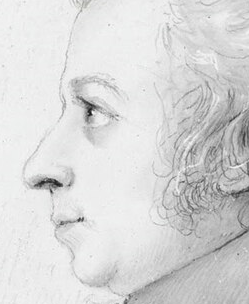
Face details of Hagenauer portrait and Stock portrait compared

What is significant is that a subset of his work was of performing artists, including at the Burgtheater, where several of Mozart's most famous operas were performed. One portrait is of an opera singer, and another is of none other than Joseph Lange (who as a hobby created the portrait shown above), in this case performing Hamlet on stage. In addition, Mozart had composed his Woodwind Serenade in E-flat major (K. 375) for the sister-in-law of Hickel, as documented in a letter Wolfgang sent to Leopold.

In the adjacent image, the facial details of the Hagenauer portrait may be compared with those of the portrait by Dora Stock, discussed above. The figure in the Stock portrait would be several years older and is wearing his own hair, not a wig. The portrait is in oil on canvas, and is currently owned by an American collector who bought it in 2005.

=== Grassi's 1783–85 portrait ===
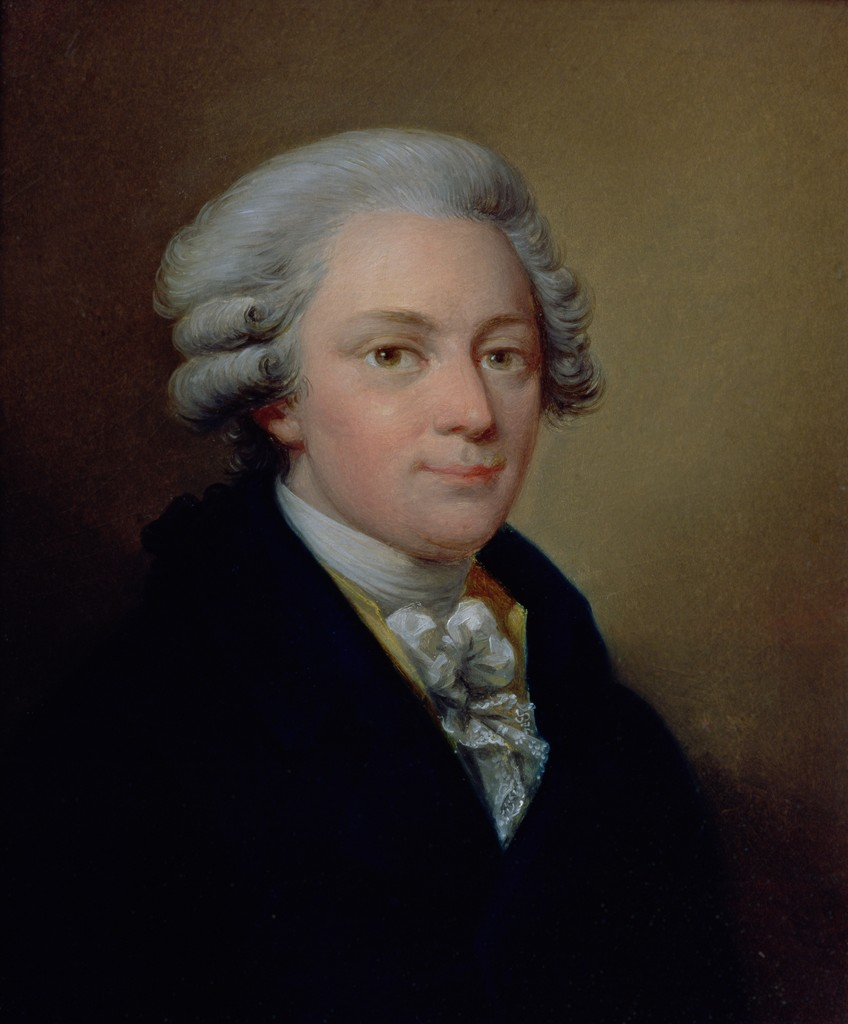

This purportedly represents Mozart circa 1783–85. It is attributed to the Austrian painter Josef Grassi, supposedly having been lost and rediscovered in Moscow in 1988. As with most of the dubious portraits, we find no reference or mention in the family correspondence, or other direct source from the period. It is known that Mozart and Grassi met in Vienna after the former's arrival there. It is oil on canvas or cardboard, and currently part of the collection of the Glinka Music Museum in Moscow.

=== Edlinger 1790 portrait ===
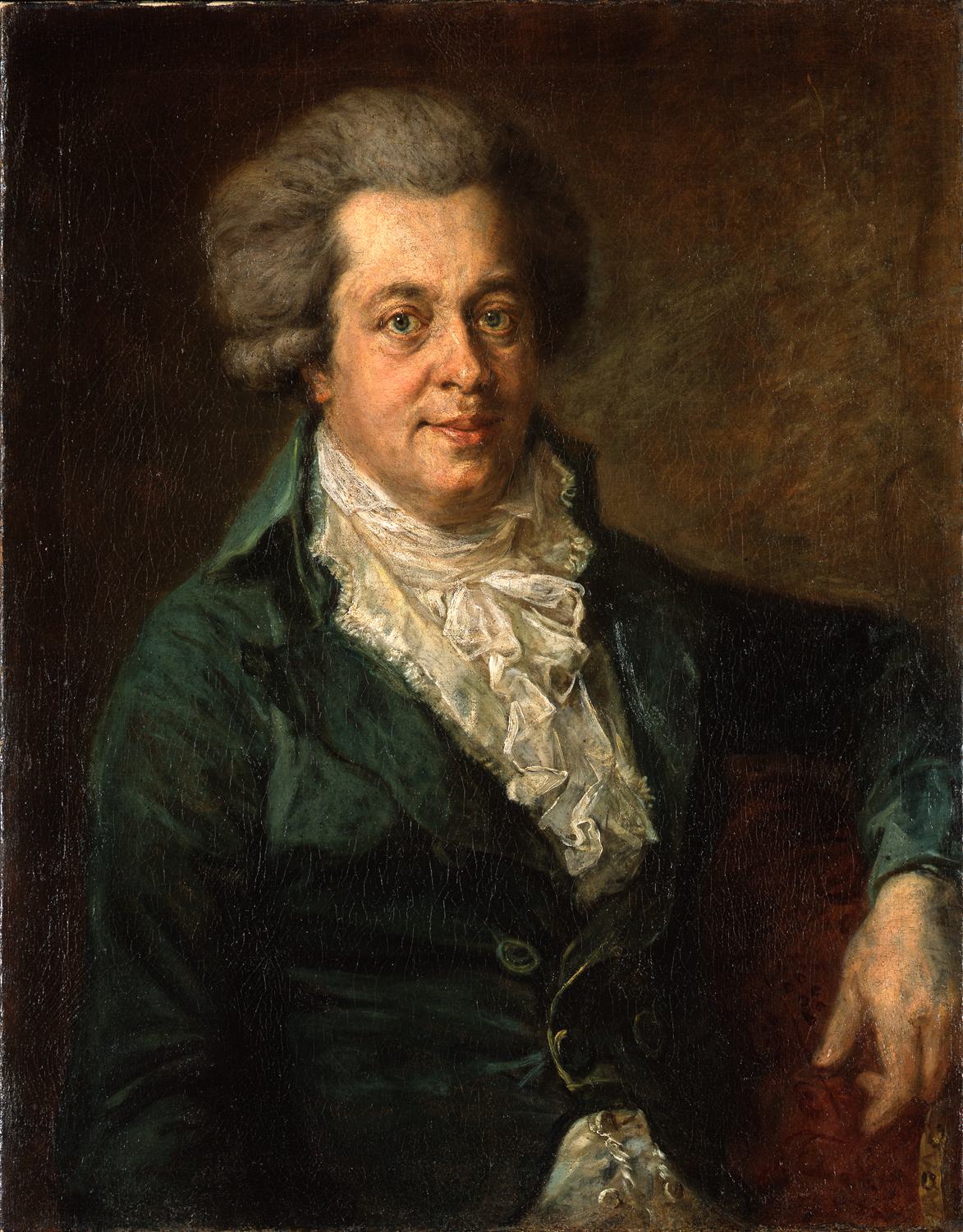

This is by far the most controversial and divisive of the doubtful Mozart portraits. It was supposedly painted in Munich between October and November 1790 by the Austrian artist Johann Georg Edlinger, during Mozart's stay in that city just a year before his death. In a letter to Constanze, the composer wrote that he originally wanted to stay for a single day, but the Elector asked him to remain to perform a concert for kings of the Two Sicilies Ferdinand I and Maria Carolina of Austria. Mozart also took advantage of the chance to visit several friends he had met in Mannheim.

The portrait was bought from a Munich art dealer in 1934, and remained in a gallery warehouse for 70 years. It remained there, both the sitter and the author being unknown until 1981, when Rolf Schenk identified the painting as a work of Edlinger. In 1995, Wolfgang Seiller, a descendant of Edlinger, noticed a similarity of the person depicted to Mozart in the Bologna portrait. Four years later, Rainer Michaelis and Wolfgang Seiller confirmed this attribution based on biographical data of Mozart and Edlinger, as well as on a detailed comparison of the portraits. This claim was also later supported by Schenk.

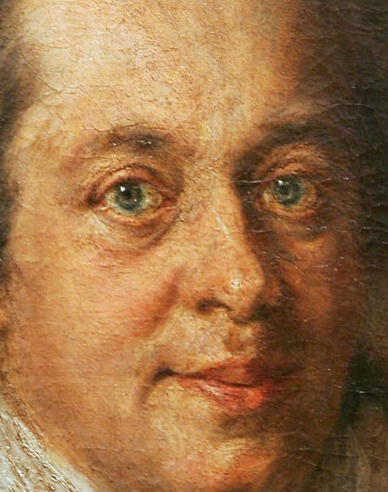
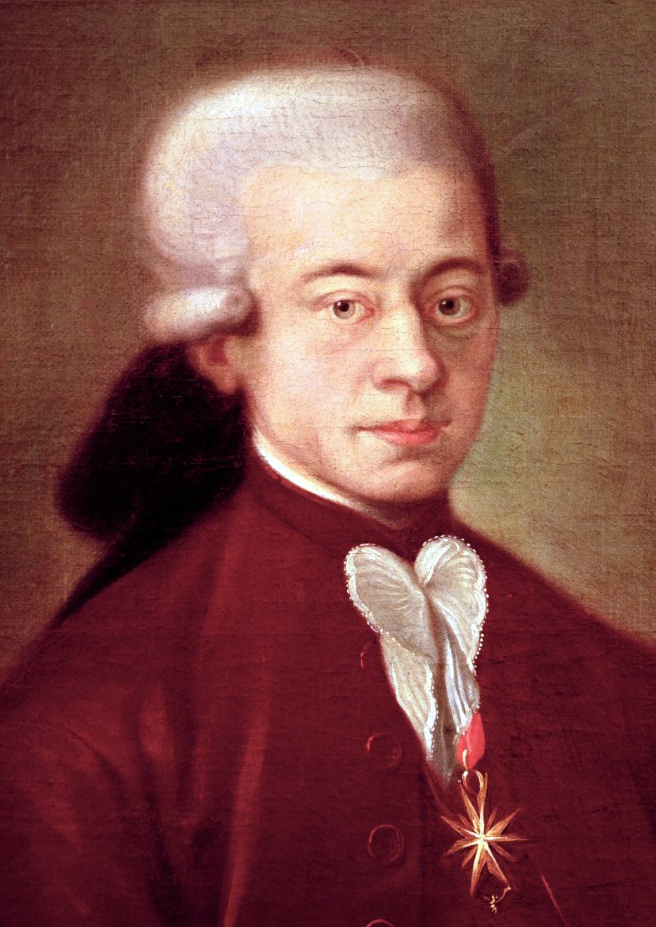
Face detail comparison with the Bologna portrait

After a restoration in 2004, the portrait was exhibited to the public on January 27 of 2005, on Mozart's 249th anniversary, and news of the discovery quickly spread. Most of these focused on the unflattering physical portrayal of Mozart. Several Mozart scholars, historians and musicologist examined the portrait and a division formed between supporters and deniers of the authenticity of the painting. Rudolph Angermüller and Gabriele Ramsauer questioned that the sitter was Mozart, asserting that it was instead a local businessman named Joseph Anton Steiner. This issue was addressed by Braun and Michaelis, both of whom pointed out that two different portraits had been mixed up.

Braun also realised a detailed comparison with the Bologna portrait, further solidifying his claim that the sitter was Mozart. On the other hand, scholar Volkmar Braunbehrens argued that, while Mozart did visit the city in that year, there is no reference of a painting being realised during the stay. Not only that, but the painter's name is also absent in Mozart's letters of these days.

John Jenkins is also cautious on the Mozart attribution, pointing to multiple differences with Lange's portrait as an example. Volker Hagedorn was also critical of the attribution and its inconsistencies. In 2006, the Mozart attribution was also confirmed by four art historians at the Austrian State Gallery in Vienna: Gerbert Frodl, Sabine Grabner, Michael Krapf, and Udo Felbinger. Sculptor Wolfgang Eckert realised a bust based on the painting, and during the project he concluded that the 1789 miniature made by Dora Stock shows the greatest similarity to Edlinger's portrait, which also would substantiate the attribution of a Mozart image created by Edlinger. It is oil on canvas, and is owned and exhibited by the Gemäldegalerie Museum.

== A selection of inauthentic portraits ==
=== Anonymous 1764 portrait ===
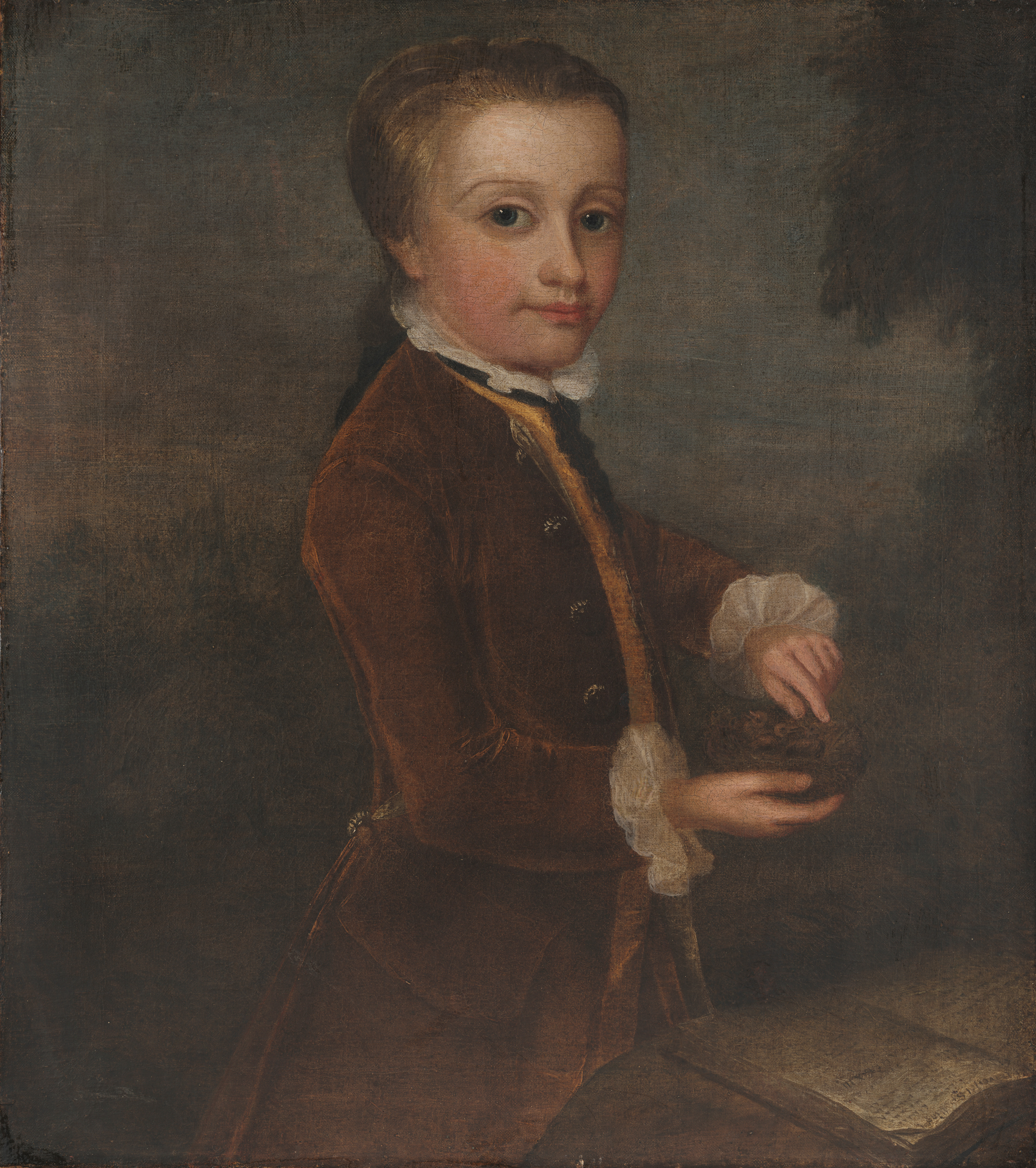

It supposedly shows Mozart in front of a round table with an open book, looking at the viewer while holding a bird's nest. It is dated 1764 and attributed to the German painter Johan Zoffany, but no conclusive evidence supports this attribution. It is probable that Zoffany met the Mozarts during their London stay between 1764 and 1765, a time in which the artist enjoyed the patronage of King George III and Queen Charlotte, and his name is mentioned in Leopold's travel notes. However, no mention of a portrait being realised appears in the correspondence, and most importantly, Zoffany's own signature is absent. The painting was considered authentic for a long time, supported by Schurig's positive comments.

The painting was rejected as a portrait of Mozart by Deutsch and Hutchings On their part, Penelope Treadwell was more nuanced on the possibility of the artwork being authentic, while British art historian Martin Postle rejected the authorship of Zoffany. A detailed examination by Mozart scholar Dexter Edge came to the conclusion that the portrait was not by Zoffany and neither represented Mozart. In the end, the Mozarteum considered the portrait to the spurious.

The painting was owned by British art dealer Percy Moore Turner, who sold it to the Mozarteum in Salzburg on 1924, claiming that the sitter was Mozart according to the signature "W. A. Mozart 1764" on a page of the book. A subsequent restoration realised in 1928 removed all overpaint, including the aforementioned signature. Thus the attribution was probably created at some point to sell the portrait at a much higher price. It is oil on canvas, being owned and exhibited by the Mozarteum.

=== Helbling's 1765–67 portrait ===
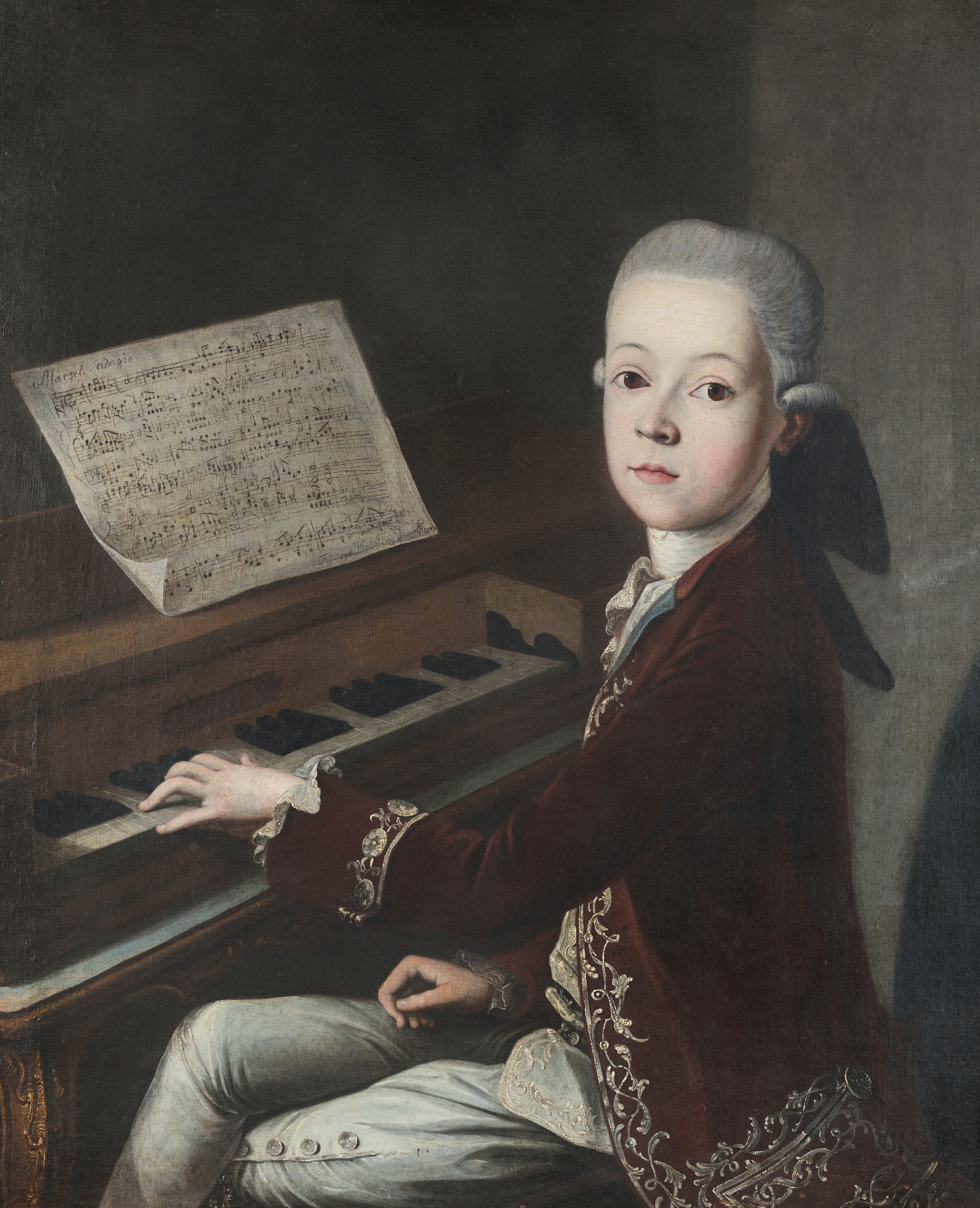

This supposedly shows Mozart looking at the viewer while playing the keyboard. It is dated circa 1765–67, painted by the Austrian artist Franz Thaddäus Helbling, whose signature appears in the bottom right corner of the score. For a long time it was considered to be authentic, being included in Schurig's list of authentic portraits of Mozart. Leisching and Einstein pointed at inconsistent details when compared with the authentic portraits, specially the brown eyes when Mozart's were known to be blue. Deutsch rejected its authenticity based on the facial features and the clothes.

Erna Felmayer discovered that the sitter is actually Count Karl Maximilian Firmian, who was born the same year as Mozart and was one of his childhood friends. The Firmians were a noble family with close ties of patronage to the Mozarts. Karl was grandson of Count Franz Lactanz Firmian, chief steward at the Salzburg residence who was also in charge of the court music. It is oil on canvas, owned by the Mozarteum in Salzburg.

=== Smissen's 1766 portrait ===
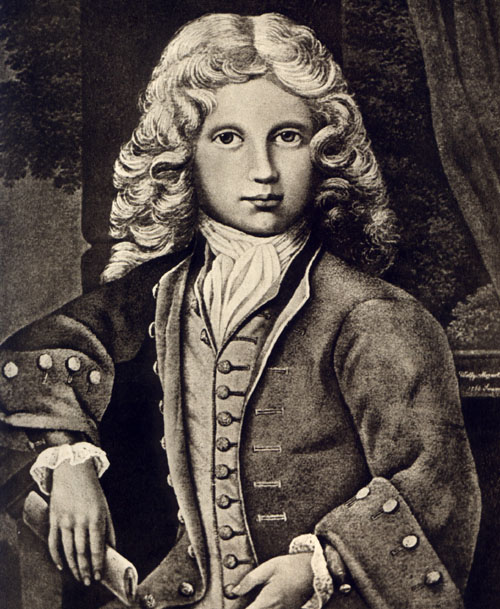
Lithograph version of the portrait

From late September 1765 to early April 1766, the Mozart family was staying in the Netherlands during their great tour of Europe. This portrait is said to have been painted in the Netherlands in the spring of 1766 by the German artist Dominicus van der Smissen. On the back is a handwritten note: "Mozart as a youth, painted by van Smissen." This is impossible because Smissen died on 6 January 1760. It also has been attributed to a non-existent J. Vander Smissen, or even Domenicus' son Jakob van Smissen (1735–1813). One other proposed explanation, which Schurig describes as "laughable", is that the signature should be read "Devotus van Smissen", Smissen having supposedly been a devout Mennonite. The portrait itself lacks any fidelity to the model, specially in the facial features and (in the painted original) the fawn-coloured eyes (Mozart's were blue). The painting is probably a forgery created to capitalize on the name of the composer. It is in oil on canvas, and resides in Mozart's birthplace in Salzburg.

=== Anonymous 1767 portrait ===
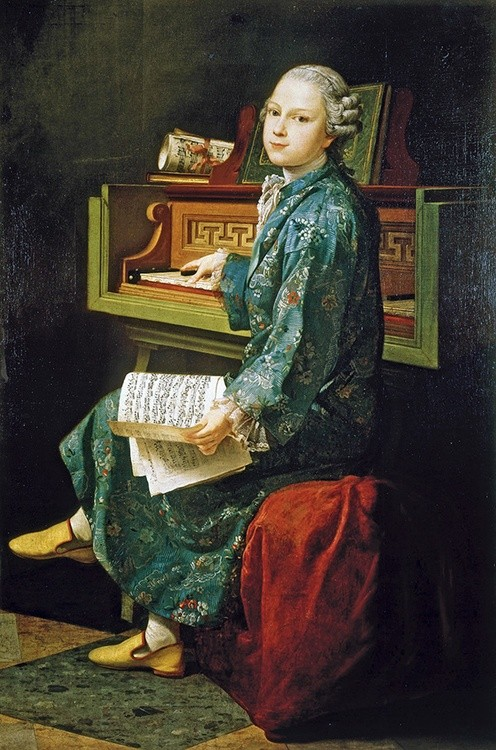

This painting is in oil on canvas; it is owned by the Louvre in Paris and is on display in the same city at the Musée de la Musique. On the lower right it bears the inscription "PINXIT [Latin: "painted"] 1767 PARIS". The work has been attributed to either Jean-Baptiste Perronneau or Joseph Duplessis; however, the verdict given by the Louvre curators is: "anonymous, French school". At some point the Louvre also changed the title assigned to the work: formerly "Portrait of Mozart", now "Portrait of a young musician".

The work shows a young man seated at a harpsichord, (Note: The instrument is identifiable as such by having both an inner and outer case; see e.g. Kottick and Lucktenberg (1997:262).) wearing a Chinese coat and looking at the viewer while pages of a score lie in his lap. Although the Mozart family did not stay in Paris during 1767, they were there from 10 May to 9 July the previous year. Further, it is not unimaginable that the lad in the painting is a boy of ten (Mozart's birthday was 27 Jan. 1756). However, other than these mere circumstances, there is no substantial evidence that connects the boy in the picture with Mozart: there are no references to the painting in the numerous letters Leopold wrote back home, nor any other clues. This suggests that the work was falsely described as being Mozart later on. Despite its dubious nature, it still frequently used as a portrait on articles and bibliography of the composer.

=== Anonymous 1770 / 1783 portrait ===
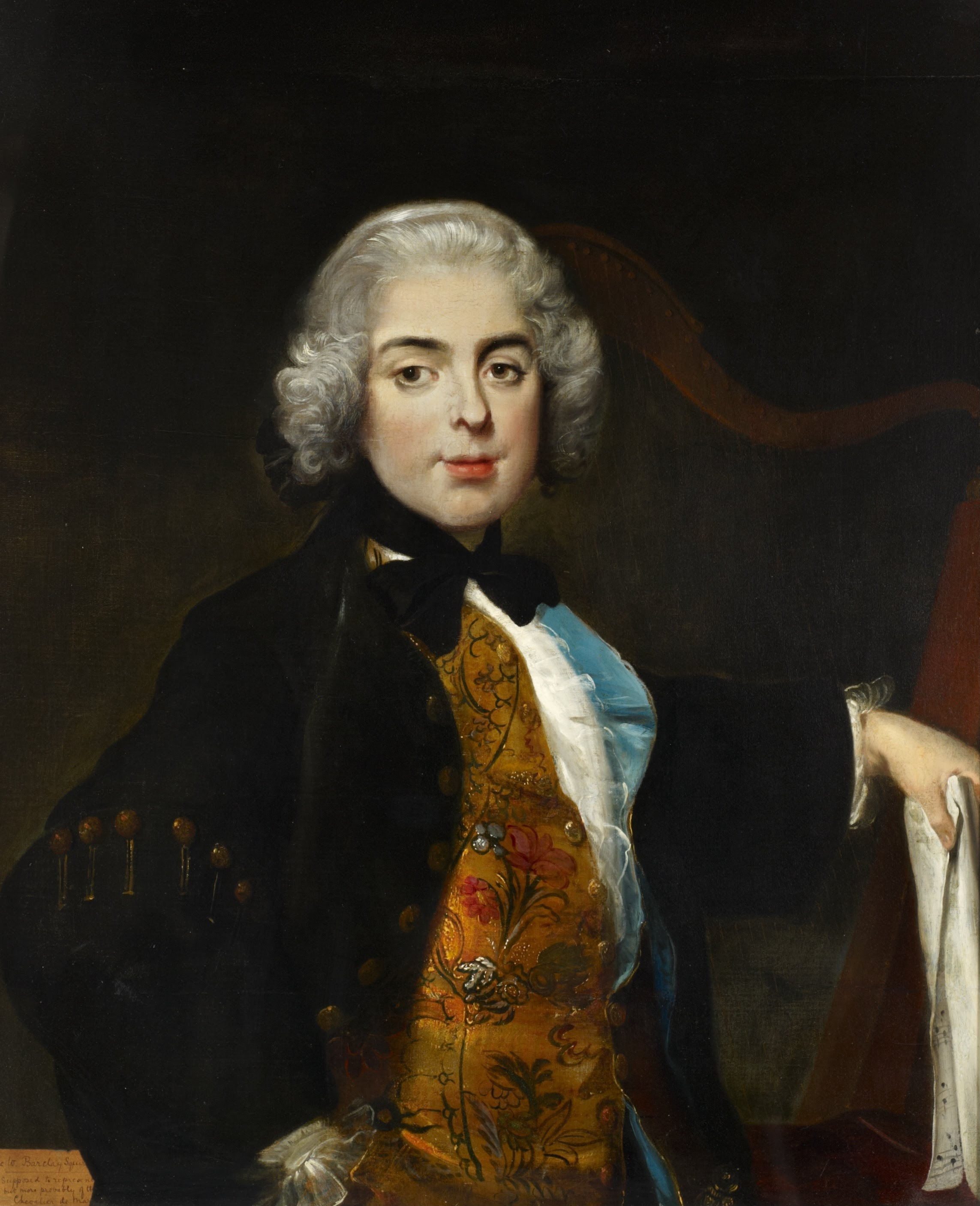

This portrait supposedly represents Mozart holding a roll of paper with the left hand, while looking at the viewer with a harp behind. It was supposedly painted in Rome in July 1770, (Note: Squire instead proposed 1783 as a speculative date) during a brief stay at the city from Naples. It is also attributed to Italian painter Pompeo Batoni, but no clear proof substantiates this claim. The painting was bought in London by William Barclay on 1892, at an Puttick & Simpson auction house in which the artwork was described as a portrait of Mozart.

Both British musicologist William Barclay Squire and Schurig pointed at substantial differences in face features and eye colour when compared with the authentic ones, the latter remarking: "Mozart would be outraged if he saw himself as a harpist!" Eventually the sitter was identified as French harpist and composer Marie-Martin Marcel Marin. He had studied in Florence with Nardini, and was a sensation in Rome during his second travel to Italy in 1783, at the age of fourteen. Its during this occasion that the artist (presumably Batoni) may have realised the portrait. Otherwise, there is no evidence Mozart and Marcel Marin met each other or had any contact. The painting is oil on canvas, being owned and exhibited by the Royal College of Music in London.

=== Dubeck's 1808 portrait ===
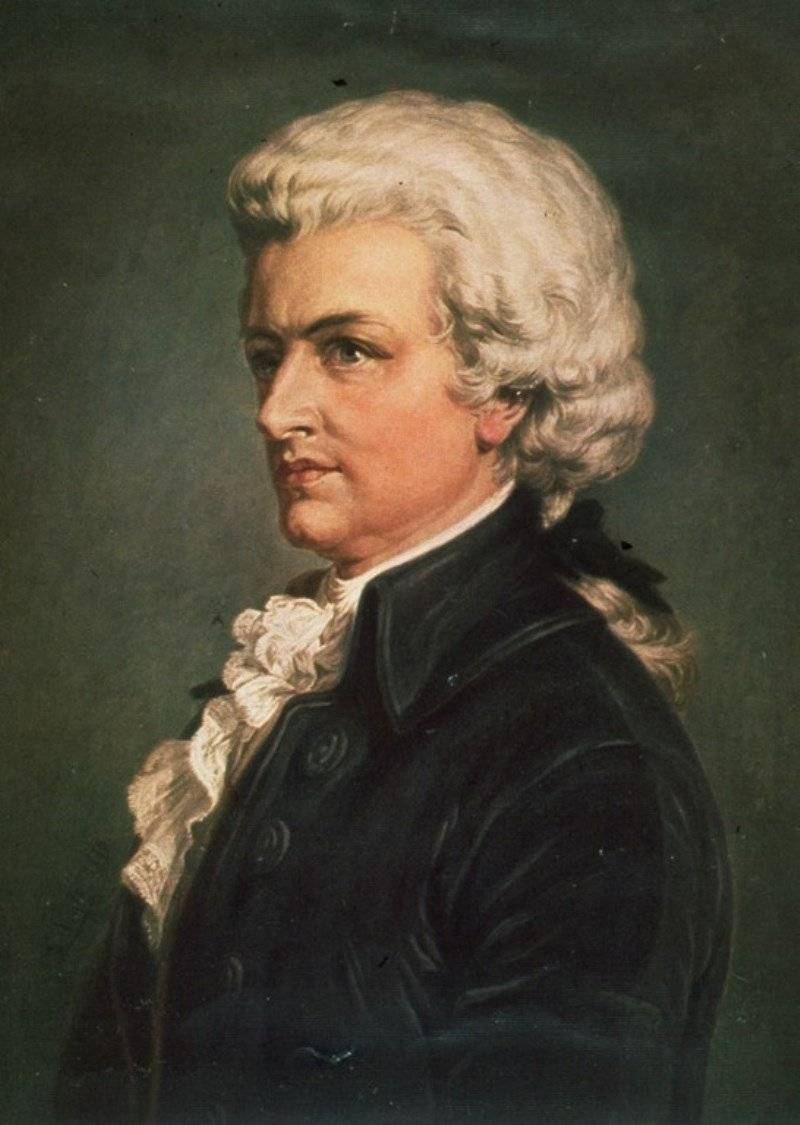

This, supposedly representing Mozart, was painted by Burchard Dubeck in 1808, 17 years after the composer's death. Little is known about the painting and the circumstances surrounding it. The German painter Karl Jäger created a copy circa 1870; he had also created portraits of other composers such as Beethoven, Haydn and Mendelssohn. This copy was widely distributed in the 19th and 20th centuries through engravings and lithographs. It is considered to be inauthentic, due to its extreme divergence from the authentic portraits.

Max Zenger included Jäger's copy in his list of false portraits, attacking it with relish: the work is a "paradigm example of kitsch portrayals"; and noting that even at the time of writing (1941) it is "by no means to be found solely on candy boxes." It is oil on canvas and is privately owned.

The poor quality of this image as a rendering of the composer has not prevented it from being used repeatedly on the Internet, including postings by prestigious institutions such as the Library of Congress (), the Encyclopædia Britannica (), the Boston Globe (), and the Saint Paul Chamber Orchestra ().

=== Kaulbach's 1873 painting ===
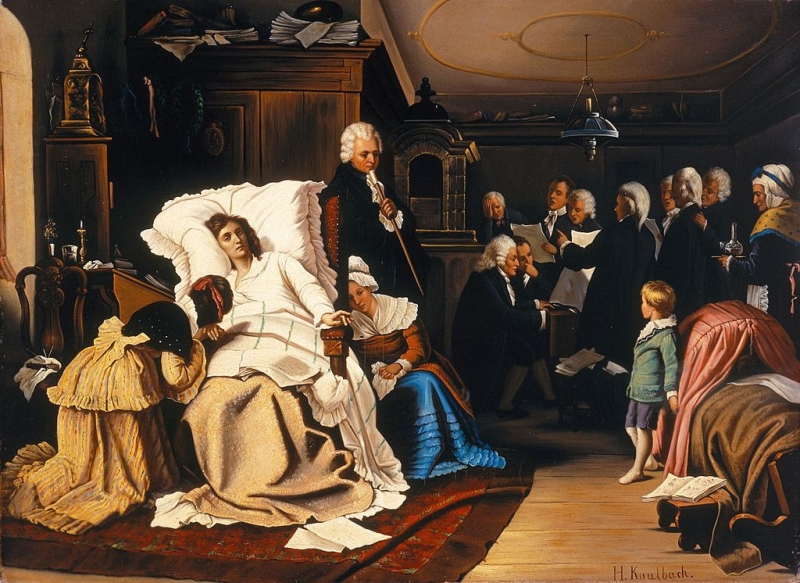

Known as "Mozart's Last Days", this painting shows the dying composer attended by his wife Constanze and his sister-in-law Sophie Weber, with the unfinished Requiem at his feet, while his friends in the background rehearse the work. To the right are Mozart's children, Karl Thomas and the infant Franz Xaver. The work was painted in 1873 by German artist Hermann von Kaulbach, and acquired by the Vienna Gallery (currently the Vienna Museum) in 1874. The painting was very popular, especially after an engraving was realized. It is a fantasy portrayal with a romanticized rendition of Mozart's appearance, disregarding the authentic iconography. The work is in oil on canvas, and the original still remains in the Vienna Museum.

The painting is based on a narrative putatively obtained from Mozart's friend Benedikt Schack and published in 1827. According to this story, the Requiem was rehearsed in Mozart's home on 4 December 1791; Mozart died that night. If the story is correct, there were actually only four singers present, of which one was Mozart himself. (Note: For further details see Benedikt Schack and Death of Mozart)
