= Karl Jäger (artist) =

German painter (1833–1887)

- Born: 17 October 1833; Nuremberg, Bavaria, Germany
- Died: 15 December 1887 (aged 54)
- Education: Munich Academy; Academy of Applied Arts
- Occupation: Painter

Karl Jäger (17 October 1833 – 15 December 1887) was a German painter.

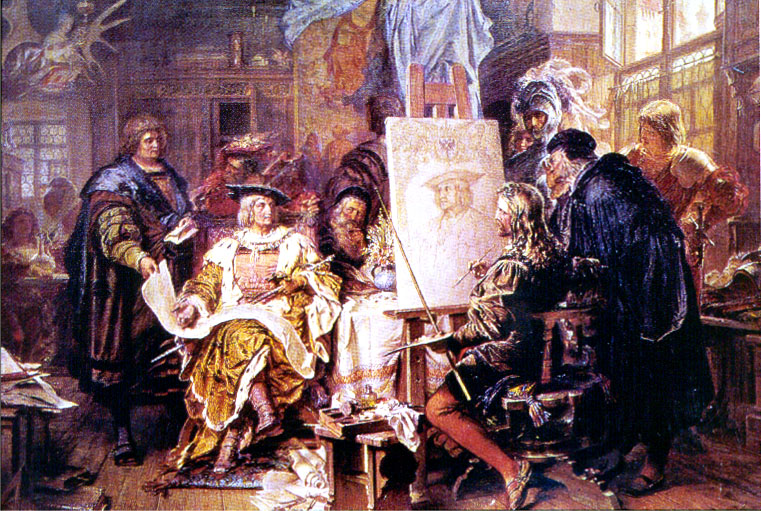
Maximilian I with Albrecht Dürer

Born in Nuremberg, Jäger studied at the Munich Academy and at the Academy of Applied Arts in Nuremberg, where he later taught drawing. Between 1882 and 1886 he painted his best-known work, Maximilian I. bei Albrecht Dürer (Maximilian I with Albrecht Dürer) for the Nuremberg town hall. He also helped to illustrate the works of Friedrich Schiller and created grisaille portraits of prominent personalities, including composers Beethoven and Haydn.
