= Pietro =

Italian male given name

- Pronunciation: Italian: [ˈpjɛːtro]
- Gender: Male
- Language: Italian
- Name day: June 29

Origin
- Region of origin: Italy

Other names
- Related names: Peter, Pietra

Pietro is an Italian masculine given name. Notable people with the name include:

== People ==
- Pietro I Candiano (c. 842–887), briefly the 16th Doge of Venice
- Pietro Tribuno (died 912), 17th Doge of Venice, from 887 to his death
- Pietro II Candiano (c. 872–939), 19th Doge of Venice, son of Pietro I

== A–E ==
- Pietro Accolti (1455–1532), Italian Roman Catholic cardinal
- Pietro Aldobrandini (1571–1621), Italian cardinal and patron of the arts
- Pietro Anastasi (1948–2020), Italian former footballer
- Pietro di Antonio Dei, birth name of Bartolomeo della Gatta (1448–1502), Florentine painter, illuminator and architect
- Pietro Aretino (1492–1556), Italian author, playwright, poet, satirist, and blackmailer
- Pietro Auletta (1698–1771), Italian composer known mainly for his operas
- Pietro Baracchi (1851–1926), Italian-born astronomer
- Pietro Bellotti (1625–1700), Italian Baroque painter
- Pietro Belluschi (1899–1994), Italian architect
- Pietro Bembo (1470–1547), Italian scholar, poet, literary theorist, member of the Knights Hospitaller and cardinal
- Pietro Bernini (1562–1629), Italian sculptor
- Pietro Borghese (1398–1484), also called Pietro della Francesca, Italian painter of the early Renaissance
- Pietro Bianchi (disambiguation)
- Pietro Campilli (1891–1974), Italian economist and politician
- Pietro Carbone (1918–1990), Italian judge
- Pietro Carnesecchi (1508–1567), Italian humanist
- Pietro Cascella (1921–2008), Italian painter and sculptor
- Pietro Cataldi (1548–1626), Italian mathematician
- Pietro Crinito (1475–1507), known as Crinitus or Pietro Del Riccio Baldi, Florentine humanist scholar and poet
- Pietro Dusina, Italian priest and inquisitor
- Pietro Erardi (1644–1727), Maltese chaplain and painter

== F–M ==
- Pietro Facchetti (1539–1613), Italian painter of the late Renaissance
- Pietro Ferrari (footballer, born 1906), Italian retired footballer
- Pietro Ferraris (1912–1991), Italian footballer
- Pietro Ferrero (disambiguation)
- Pietro Fontana (engraver) (1762–1837), Italian engraver
- Pietro Fontana (engineer), early 19th century Italian engineer and agronomist
- Pietro Germi (1914–1974), Italian actor, screenwriter and director
- Pietro Lanza di Scalea (1863–1938), Italian noble and politician
- Pietro Lesana, Italian bobsledder
- Pietro Locatelli (1695–1764), Italian Baroque composer and violinist
- Pietro Lombardi (architect) (1894–1984), Italian architect
- Pietro Lombardi (wrestler) (1922–2011), Italian wrestler
- Pietro Lombardi (singer) (born 1992), German singer
- Pietro Loredan (1372–1438), Venetian nobleman and military commander on sea and land
- Pietro Antonio Lorenzoni (1721–1782), Austrian painter
- Pietro Magni (sculptor) (1817–1877), Italian sculptor
- Pietro Magni (engineer) (1898–1988), Italian aeronautical engineer
- Pietro Magni (footballer) (1919–1992), Italian footballer and football manager
- Pietro Melchiorre Ferrari (1735–1787), painter from Parma
- Pietro Mennea (1952–2013), Italian sprinter and politician
- Pietro Metastasio, pseudonym of Pietro Antonio Domenico Trapassi (1698–1782), Italian poet and librettist

== N–Z ==
- Pietro Negroni (c. 1505–1565), Italian painter of the Renaissance
- Pietro Pastore (1908–1969), Italian footballer and actor
- Pietro Pedranzini (1826–1903), Italian Lieutenant
- Pietro Perti or Peretti (1648–1714), Italian Baroque sculptor and architect
- Peter S. Pezzati (1902–1993), aka Pietro Pezzati, American portrait painter
- Pietro Pezzati (artist) (1828–1898), Italian mural painter
- Pietro Porcinai (1910–1986), Italian landscape architect
- Pietro Scalia (born 1960), Italian-American film editor
- Pietro Scarcella (born 1950), Italian-Canadian mobster
- Pietro Antonio Solari (c. 1445–1493), Italian architect and sculptor
- Pietro Torre (born 2002), Italian fencer
- Pietro or Pier Paolo Vergerio (c. 1498–1565), Italian religious reformer
- Pietro De Vico (1911–1999), Italian film actor
- Pietro Vierchowod (born 1959), Italian football manager and former player
- Pietro Vinci (c. 1525–1584), Italian composer
- Pietro Ziani (died 1230), 42nd Doge of Venice

== Fictional characters ==
- Pietro Maximoff, a Marvel Comics superhero known as Quicksilver
- Pietro, the main character in the PopoloCrois game series

== See also ==
- San Pietro (disambiguation)
- Peter (given name)
- Pietra (disambiguation)
