= Pietra (surname) =

Pietra is an Italian surname. Notable people with the surname include:

- Andrea Pietra (born 1968), Argentine actress
- Angelo Pietra (1550–1587), Italian Benedictine economist
- Gaetano Pietra (1879–1961), Italian statistician
- Minervino Pietra (born 1954), Portuguese footballer

== See also ==
- Pietra (disambiguation)
- Pietro (disambiguation)
- Pietri (surname)
