= Johann Baptist von Lampi the Younger =

Italian painter (1775–1837)

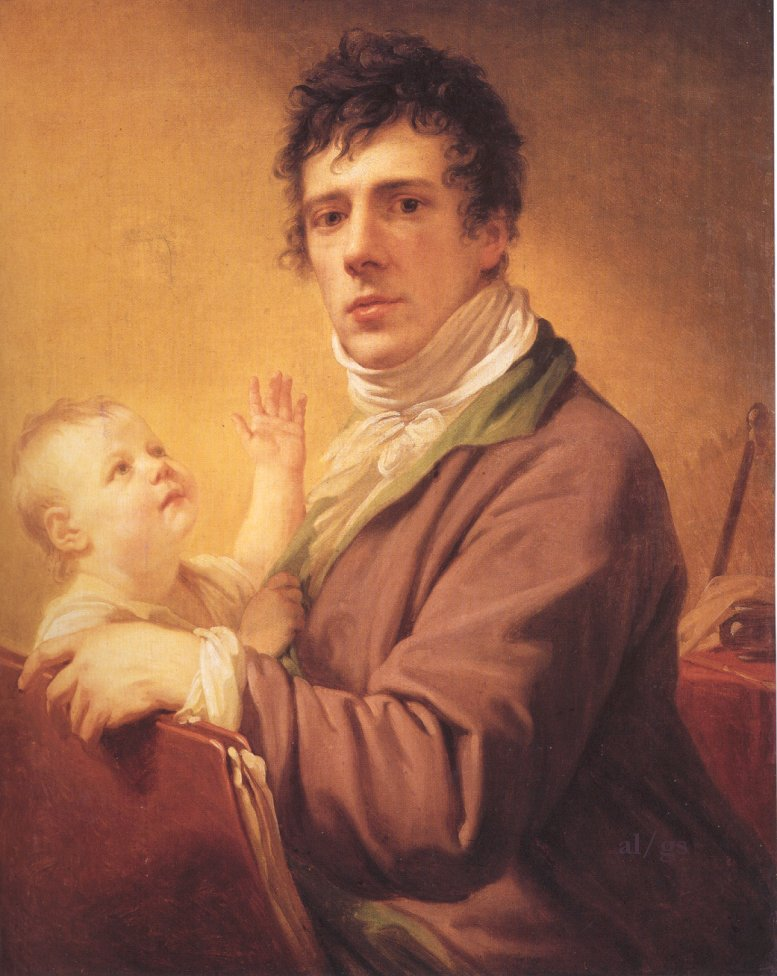
- Portrait of Lampi with his son Alexander by his father (c. 1810)
- Born: March 4, 1775; Trento
- Died: February 17, 1837 (aged 61); Vienna
- Education: Member Academy of Arts (1797)
- Alma mater: Academy of Fine Arts Vienna
- Known for: Painting
- Children: 3
- Father: Johann Baptist von Lampi the Elder
- Relatives: Matthias Lamp (grandfather); Johann Nepomuk della Croce (second cousin); Pietro Antonio Lorenzoni (first cousin once removed); Franciszek Ksawery Lampi (brother)

Johann Baptist von Lampi the Younger (4 March 1775 – 17 February 1837), also known as Johann Baptist (von) Lampi II, was an Austrian portrait painter.

== Biography ==
He was born to the portrait painter, Johann Baptist von Lampi, now known as "The Elder", and his first wife, Anna Maria née Franchi (1745–1795). After receiving his first lessons from his father, he followed him to Vienna in 1786, where he enrolled at the Academy of Fine Arts. His primary instructors there were Hubert Maurer and Heinrich Friedrich Füger.

Upon completing his studies, in 1791, he accompanied his father and his younger brother, Franz Xaver (who was also a painter), to Saint Petersburg; enticed by an extremely generous offer from Catherine the Great. He would stay there for thirteen years. In 1795, his work earned him the honorary title of "Free Artist" from the Imperial Academy of Arts. Two years later, praise for his portrait of Professor Ivan Akimov led to his being named an "Academician".

He returned to Vienna with his wife and daughter in 1804, to accept a position at the court of Francis I, who had declared himself Emperor of Austria. In 1813, he was named a Professor and became a member of the Council of the Academy of Arts. He took over his father's workshop in 1822. He was primarily a portrait painter, but also created genre scenes and religious works.

His works may be seen at the Belvedere Gallery, the Vienna Museum, the Salzburg Museum, and the Tretyakov Gallery. His eldest son, Johann Baptist Matthias Edler von Lampi III (1807–1857), was also a painter of some note.

== Selected portraits ==
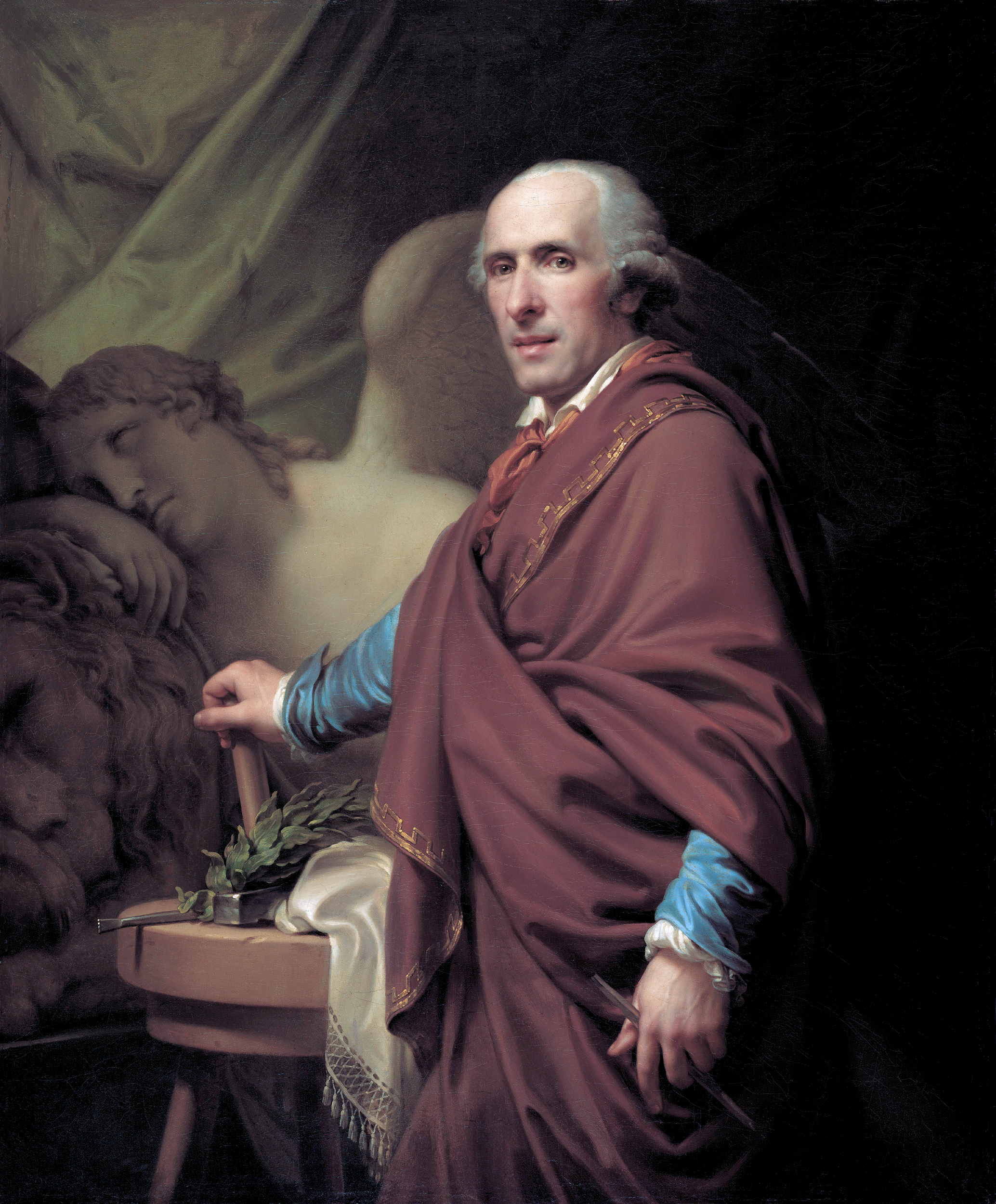
Antonio Canova

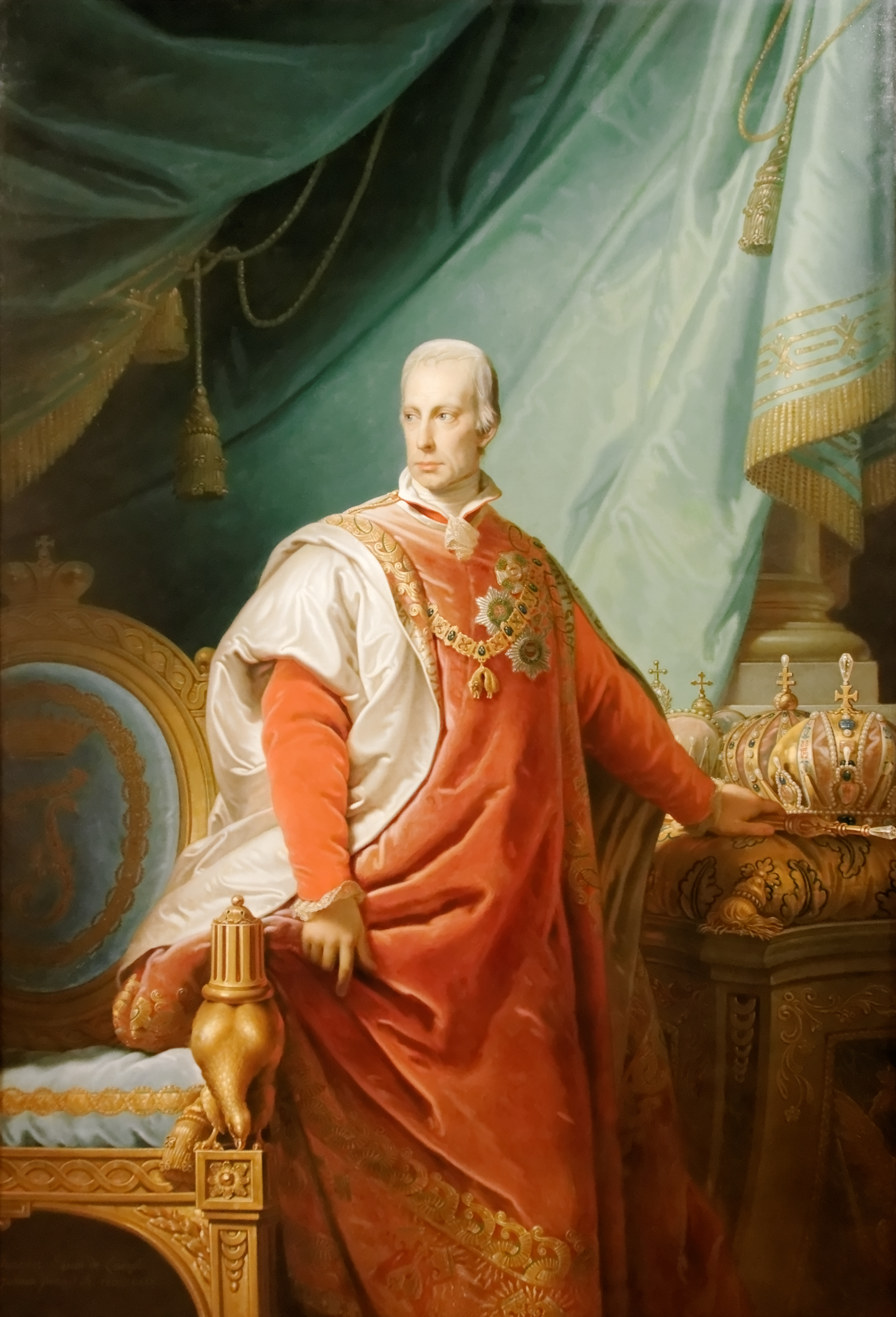
Francis I

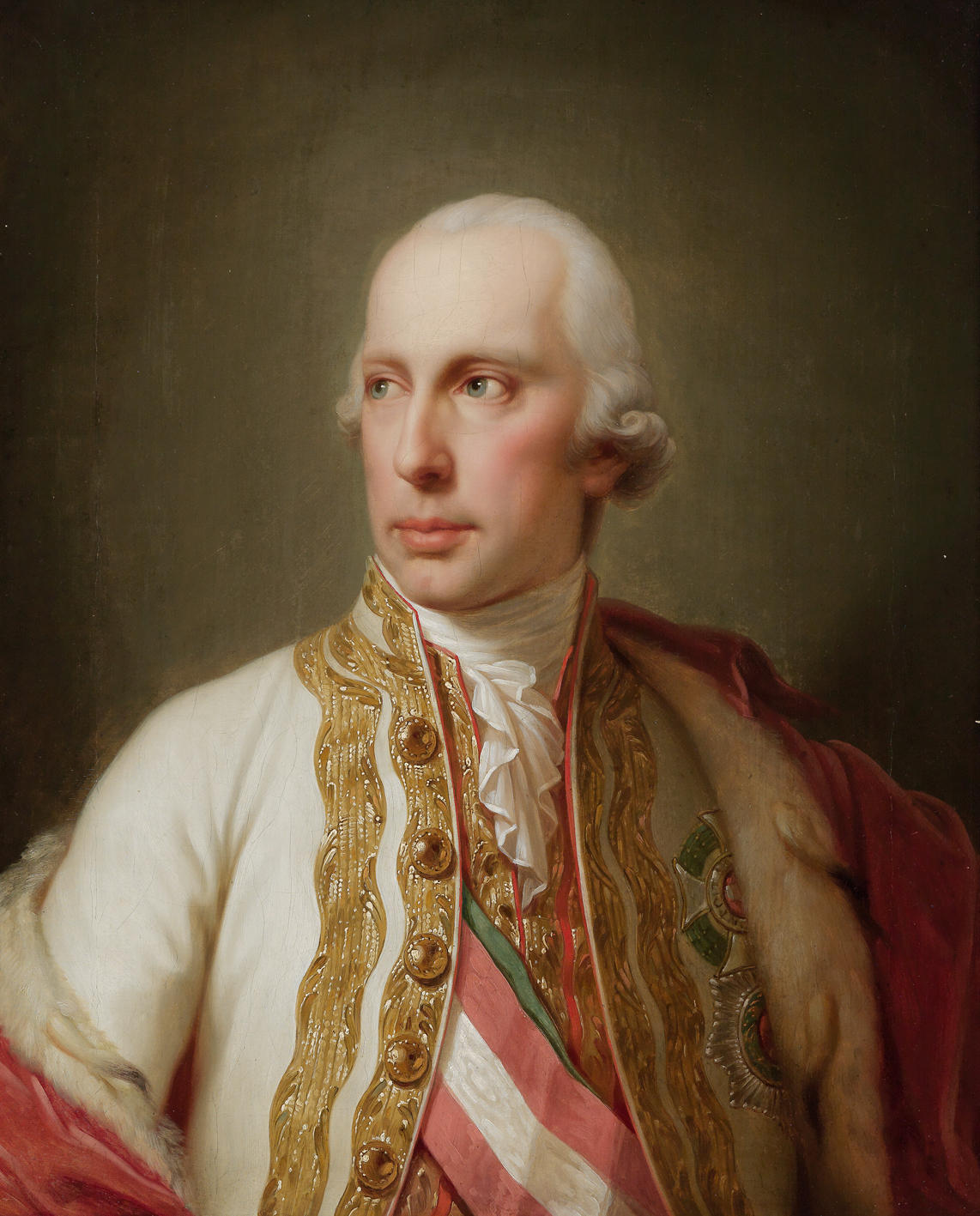
Francis I

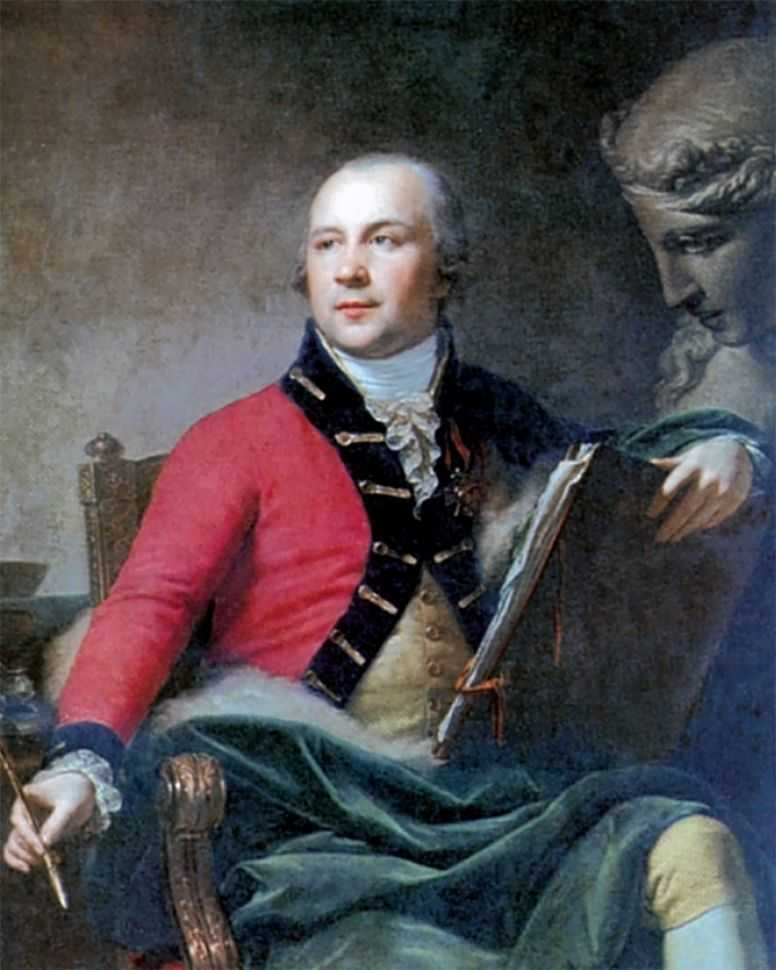
Ivan Akimov

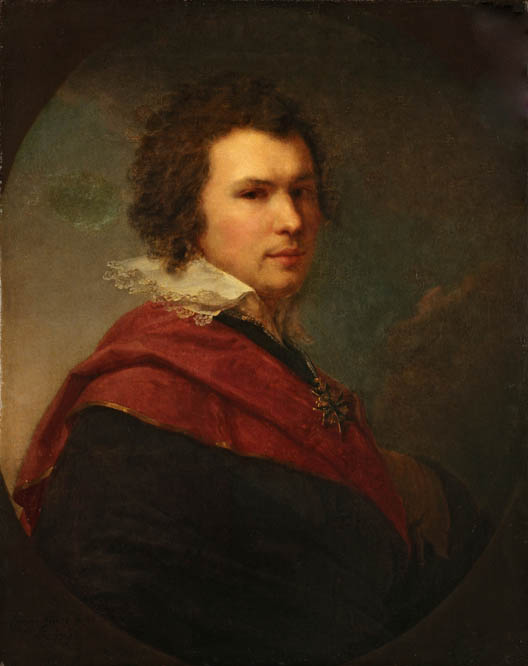
Apollon Maykov

== Sources ==
- Constantin von Wurzbach: "Lampi, Johann Baptist Ritter von (Sohn)." In: Biographisches Lexikon des Kaiserthums Oesterreich (Biographical Lexicon of the Empire of Austria). Part 14 Kaiserlich-königliche Hof- und Staatsdruckerei, Vienna 1865, p. 61 f. (digitalised).
- Schöny: "Lampi Johann Bapt. von d. J.". In: Österreichisches Biographisches Lexikon 1815–1950 (ÖBL). Vol. 4, Austrian Academy of Sciences, Vienna 1969, p. 421.
- Bryan, Michael (1889), Walter Armstrong and Robert Edmund Graves (ed.), Dictionary of Painters and Engravers, Biographical and Critical, vol. II L-Z, London: George Bell and Sons, p. 8
