= Franciszek Ksawery Lampi =

Polish romantic painter (1782–1852)

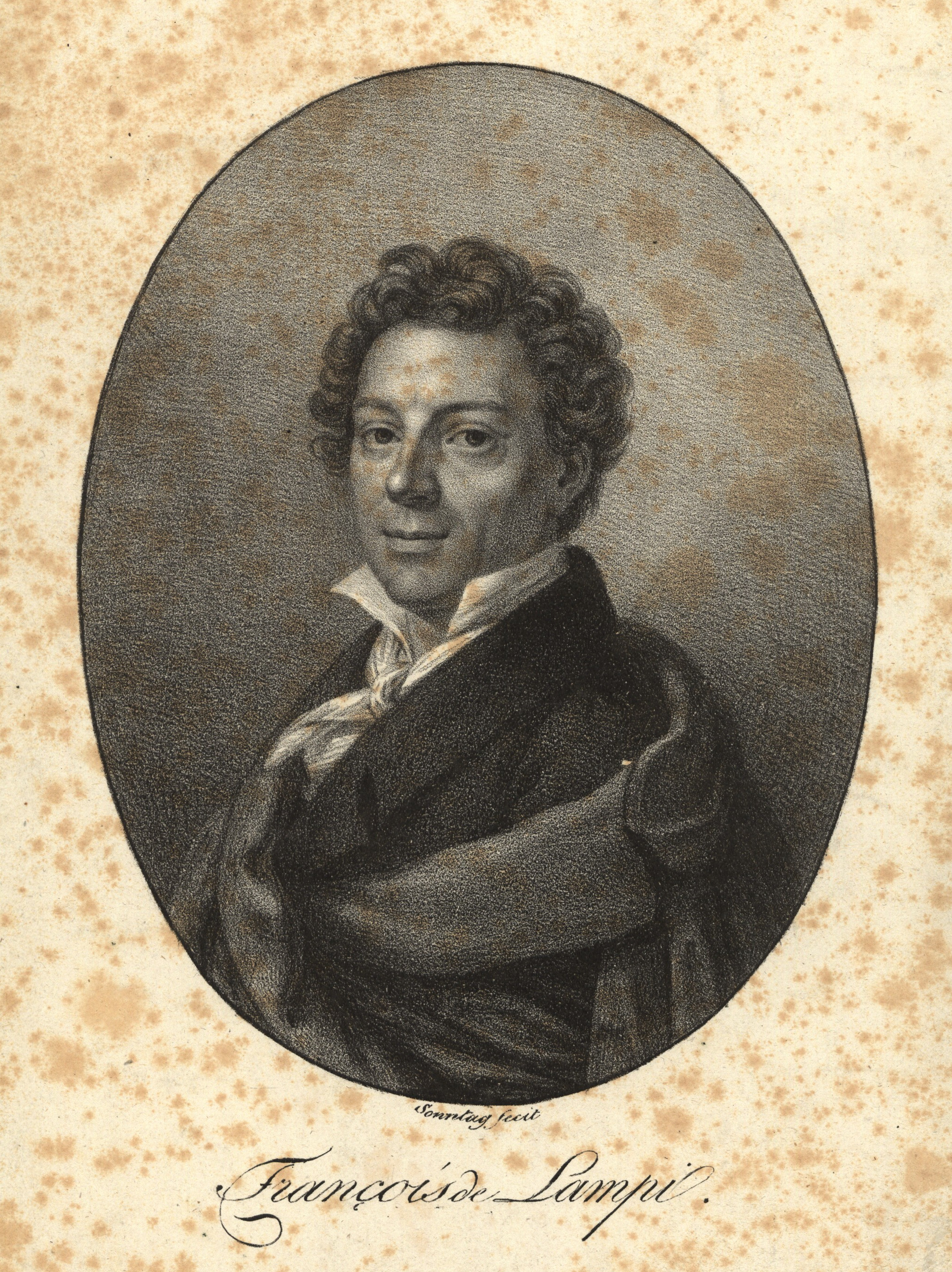
- Portrait of Lampi by Joseph Sonntag (1834)
- Born: 22 January 1782; Klagenfurt, Austria
- Died: 22 July 1852 (aged 70); Warsaw, Poland
- Education: Academy of Fine Arts Vienna
- Known for: Painting, art education
- Movement: Romanticism
- Children: 2
- Father: Johann Baptist von Lampi the Elder
- Relatives: Matthias Lamp (grandfather); Johann Nepomuk della Croce (second cousin); Pietro Antonio Lorenzoni (first cousin once removed); Johann Baptist von Lampi the Younger (brother)

Franciszek Ksawery Lampi (22 January 1782 – 22 July 1852), also known as Franz Xaver Lampi or Franz Serafin Ferdinand Lampi, was a Polish Romantic painter born in Austria of ethnic Italian background. He was associated with the aristocratic circle of the late Stanisław II Augustus, the last Polish king before the foreign partitions of Poland. Lampi settled in Warsaw around 1815 at the age of 33, and established himself as the leading landscape and portrait artist in Congress Poland soon after Napoleon's defeat in Russia.

== Early life ==
Lampi was the son of renowned Italian historical painter Johann Baptist von Lampi the Elder from Romeno (b. 1751) known as Jan Chrzciciel Lampi in Poland, who was invited to Warsaw by King Stanisław II August in 1786 when Franz (Franciszek) was 4 years old (or between 1788 and 1791, according to different source).

He was born in Klagenfurt, where his father worked on commissions for the Austrian court. He was the younger brother of Johann Baptist von Lampi (b. 1775), also a portrait painter in the Lampi family; and was initially taught painting by his father, before entering the Academy of Fine Arts Vienna in the studios of Hubert Maurer and Heinrich Füger. When he was 15 years old, the Lampi family relocated to St. Petersburg in 1797 during the third and final partition of Poland, enticed by an extremely generous offer from the Tsar. Estranged from his father, and disinherited, Franciszek Lampi left St. Petersburg at the age of 32 after the Napoleonic Wars, and settled in Warsaw a year later in 1815. The already well-established reputation of his father in Poland as well as his own Polish childhood helped him blend into society.

== Later career ==
He exhibited at Warsaw Salons in 1828, 1838, 1841 and 1845; and opened a small private art school in 1841.

Lampi painted mostly aristocratic portraits and specialized in the Romantic depictions of attractive women. What's more, he produced fantastic landscapes and seascapes inspired by the new intellectual forces of the Age of Enlightenment and the philosophical evolution of Romanticism in Poland. His art style was similar to the work of Italian Salvator Rosa and Claude-Joseph Vernet of France. He gave art classes in his studio, but also traveled. In 1817–1819 he was teaching in Kraków. Among his most notable students were Wojciech Korneli Stattler and Piotr Michałowski.

In 1823 he went to Lublin on commission, in 1830 to Vilnius. After the November Uprising against the Russian Empire he spent a few years in Wrocław (Breslau) before returning to Warsaw in 1836. In 1840 he visited Dresden, Berlin and Munich – known as Franz Xaver Ferdinand von Lampi in German.

In 1850 Lampi returned to Warsaw where he died in 1852 at the age of 70, said to have been a possible victim of the cholera outbreak. His work can be found at the National Museum of Poland and its branches including Warsaw, Kraków, Poznań as well as in the Mykolas Žilinskas Art Gallery (Kaunas, Lithuania).

== Selected paintings ==
Landscapes
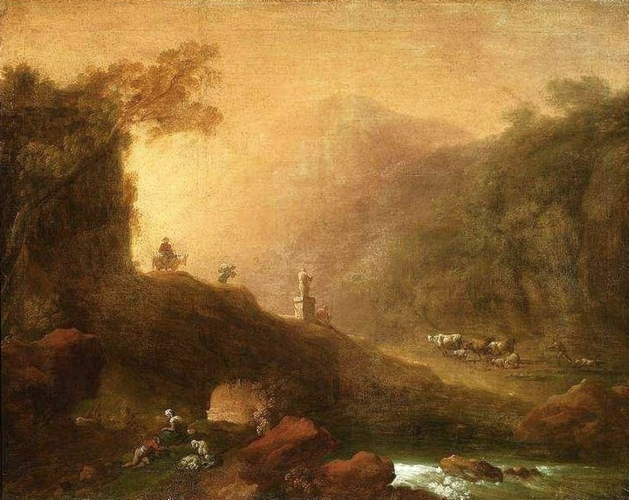
Romantic scenery, c.1820/30

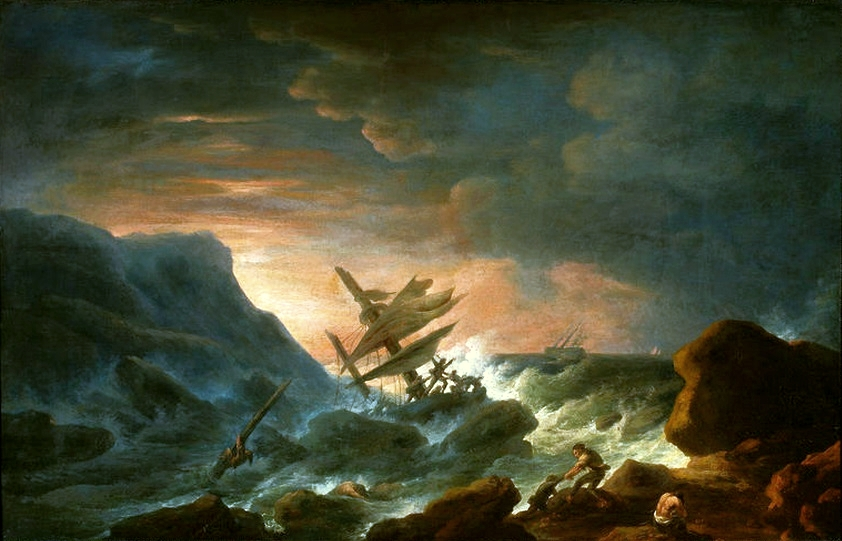
Castaways at strands, 1840

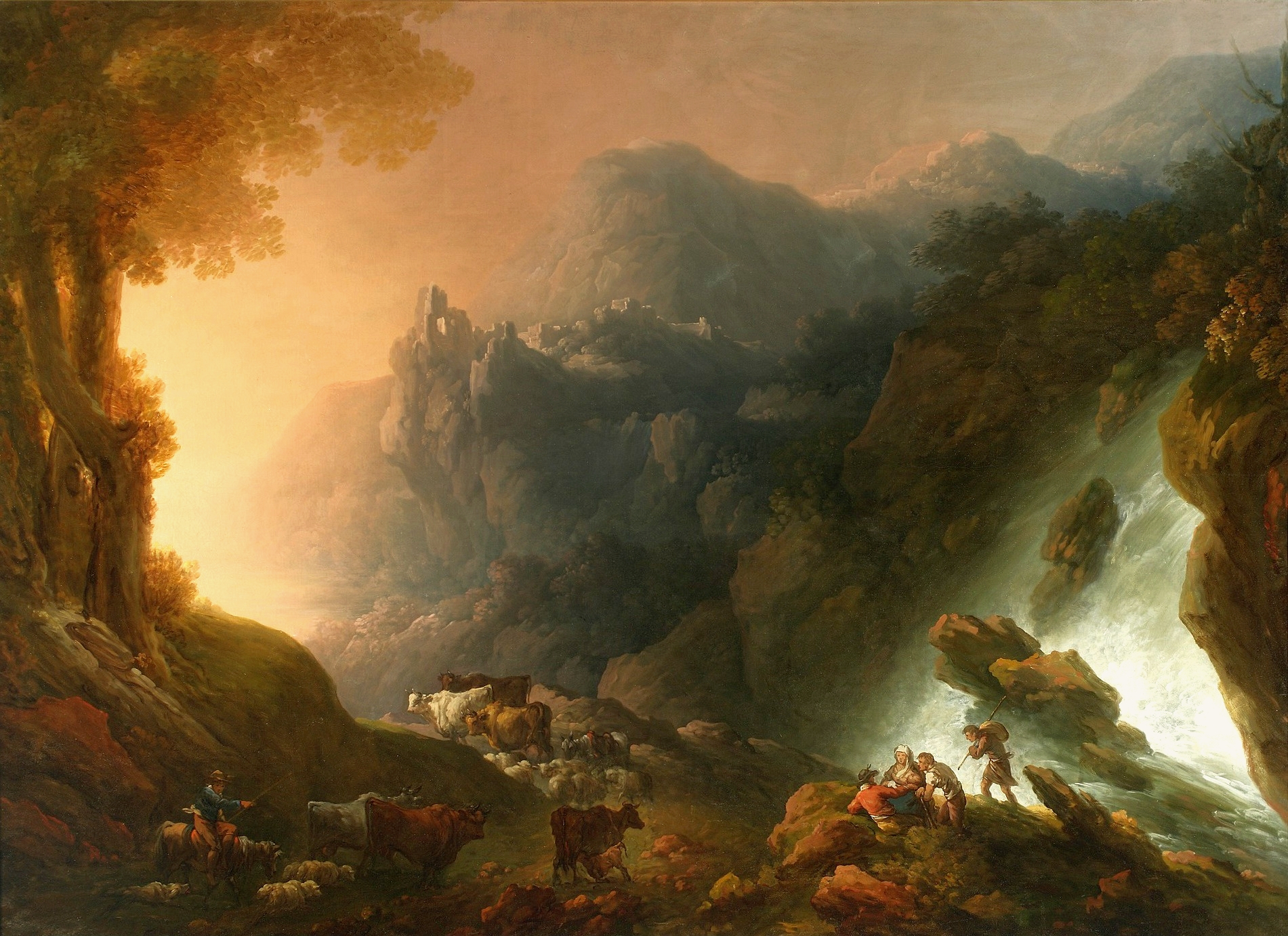
Mountain waterfall, ca.1830

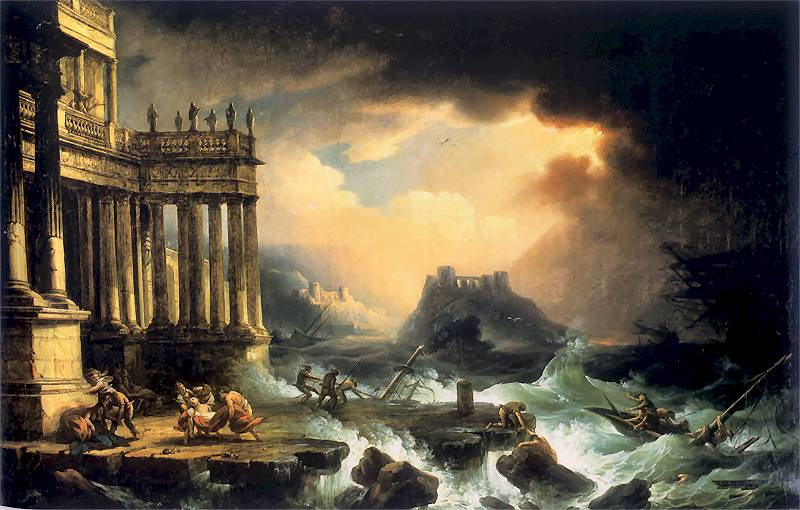
Rescuing castaways, 1850
Portraits of women
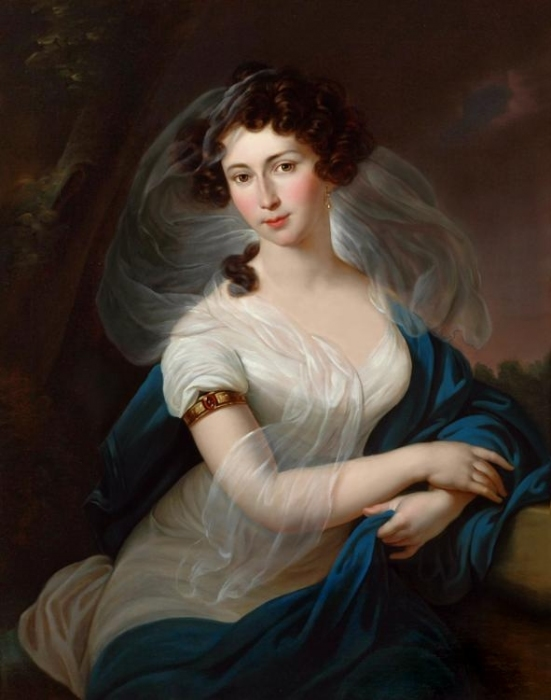
Portrait of a Lady

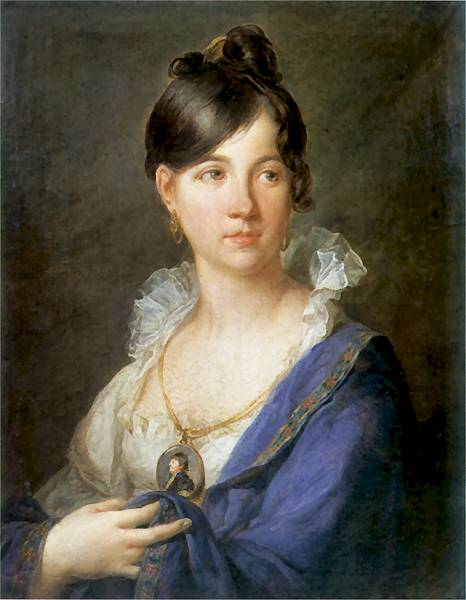
Maria Borakowska

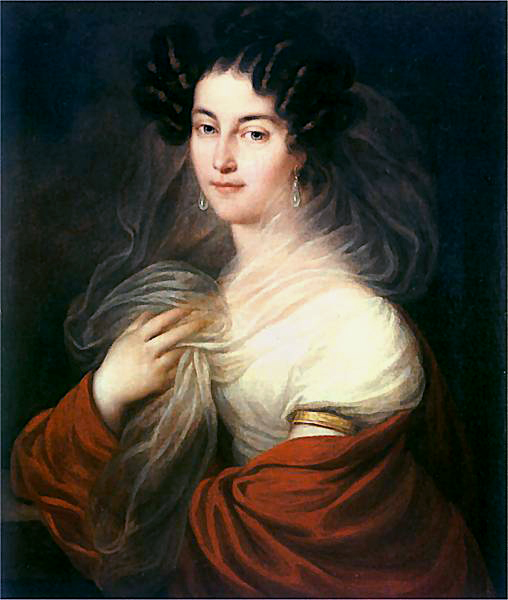
Celina Radziwiłł

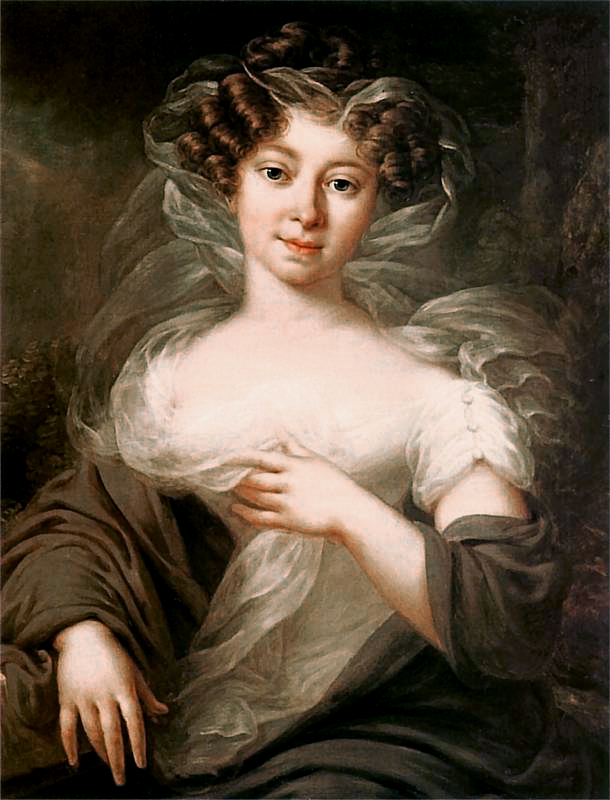
Magdalena Łuszczewska

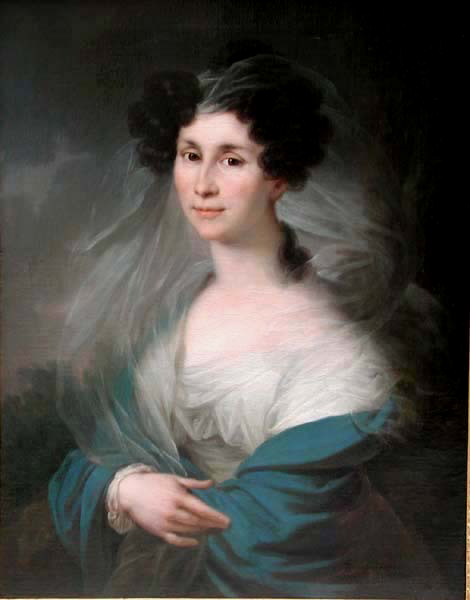
Portrait of a Lady
