= Pietro Ferrari =

Pietro Ferrari may refer to:

- Pietro Ferrari (footballer born 1906), Italian footballer who played for Roma and Casale in the Serie A
- Pietro Ferrari (footballer born 1914), Italian footballer who played for Bologna in the Serie A and Italy national team
- Pietro Melchiorre Ferrari (1735–1787), painter from Parma

== See also ==
- Pietro Ferraris (1912–1991), Italian footballer
