= Johann Baptist von Lampi the Elder =

Austrian-Italian painter (1751–1830)

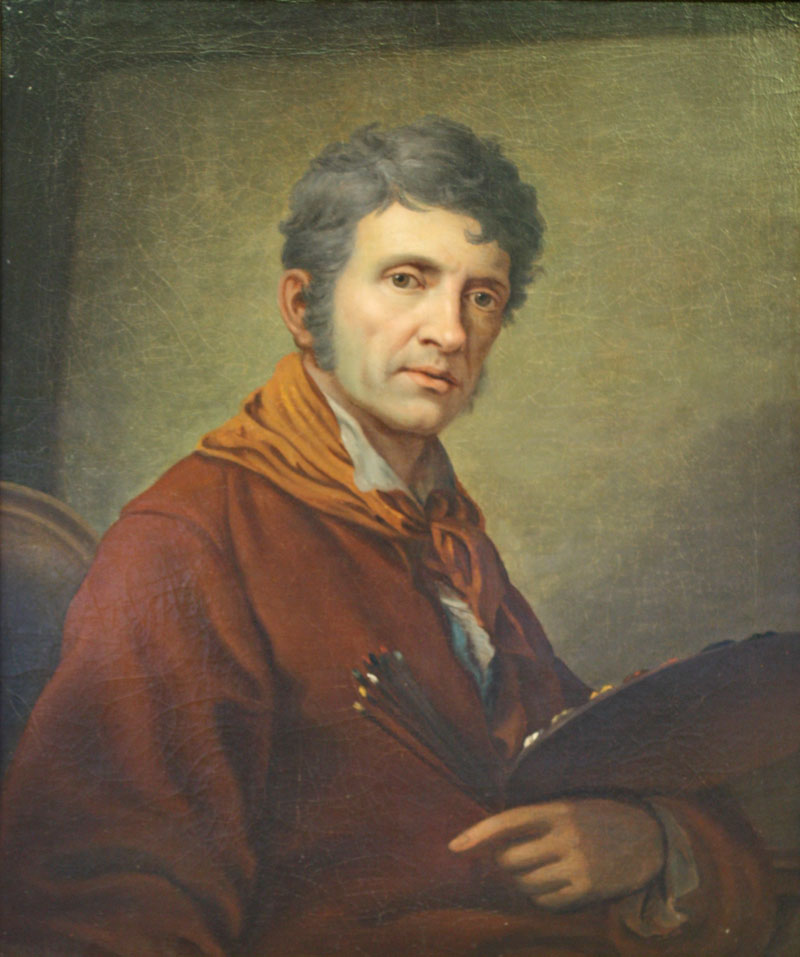
- Self-portrait (1808/10)
- Born: 31 December 1751; Romeno, County of Tyrol
- Died: 11 February 1830 (aged 78); Vienna, Austrian Empire
- Known for: Portrait painting
- Spouses: Anna Maria Franchi (m. 1772; died 1795) Juliane Regini (m. 1807; died 1829)
- Children: 7, including Johann and Franciszek
- Father: Matthias Lamp
- Relatives: Johann Nepomuk della Croce (first cousin once removed); Pietro Antonio Lorenzoni (cousin)

Reichsritter Johann Baptist von Lampi the Elder (German: Johann Baptist von Lampi der Ältere, Polish: Jan Chrzciciel Lampi starszy; 31 December 1751 – 11 February 1830), also known as Johann Baptist (Reichsritter von) Lampi I, was an Austrian–Italian historical and portrait painter. He notably worked in the Russian Empire during Catherine the Great's final years, enticed by an extremely generous offer from her court.

== Life ==
Johann Baptist Lampi was born at Romeno in the County of Tyrol to Matteo/Mattia Lampi, born Matthias Lamp (1698–1780), a decorative painter. Frescoes by his father may be found in many elegant buildings there. He studied art under his father in Verona and later in Salzburg.

In 1773 he went to Trento, where he learned to become a portraitist in canvases and miniatures. He travelled to Innsbruck, then to Vienna, where the Emperor Joseph II appointed him a professor at the Vienna Academy in 1786. That same year, he was invited to Warsaw by the court of King Stanisław II Augustus (pictured). He worked in Warsaw until the complete military Partitions of Poland.

In 1791, he moved to Saint Petersburg where the Empress gave him a hereditary knighthood. In Russia he devoted himself to portrait painting, and amassed a large fortune. He painted the Empress Catherine II and Empress Maria Feodorovna (Sophie Dorothea of Württemberg) among others. He returned to Vienna in 1797 and became its honorary citizen in 1799. Pensioned in 1822, he died at Vienna on 11 February 1830. Twice a widower, von Lampi the Elder's death succeeded that of his second wife by a mere seven weeks.

Both of his sons were also accomplished painters. The older one, Johann Baptist the Younger stayed first with him and later by himself in Russia for 13 years. His younger son, Francesco, or Franz Xaver (born in Klagenfurt in 1783) settled at Warsaw in Congress Poland for the rest of his life, estranged from his father. He became known as Franciszek Ksawery Lampi in Polish. He painted portraits and landscapes, exhibited at Warsaw Salons, and opened an art school there in 1841. In 1823 he travelled to Vienna, Lublin, and in 1830 to Vilna. After the November Uprising against the Russians, he spent a few years in Wrocław. In 1840 he visited Dresden, Berlin and Munich. Franciszek later returned to Warsaw, where he died in 1852.

== Selected portraits ==
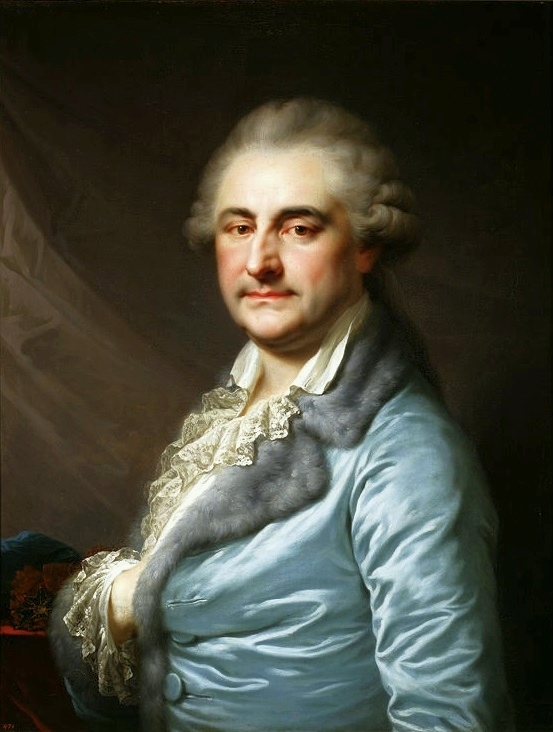
King Stanisław II August (1788-1789), National Museum in Warsaw

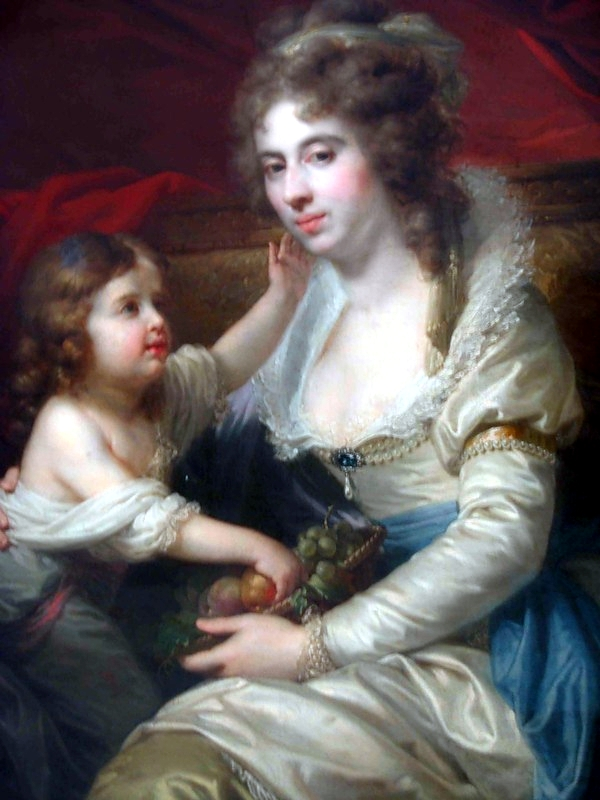
Countess Zavadskaya
with her daughter

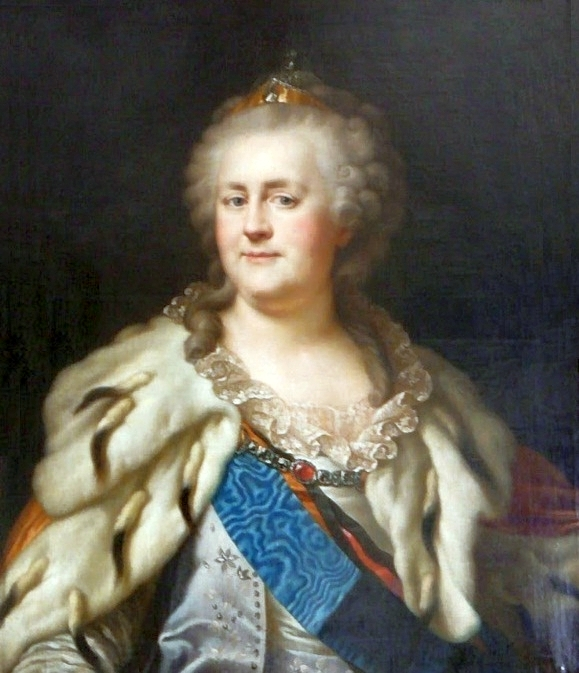
Catherine II of Russia (circa 1791), Łazienki Palace

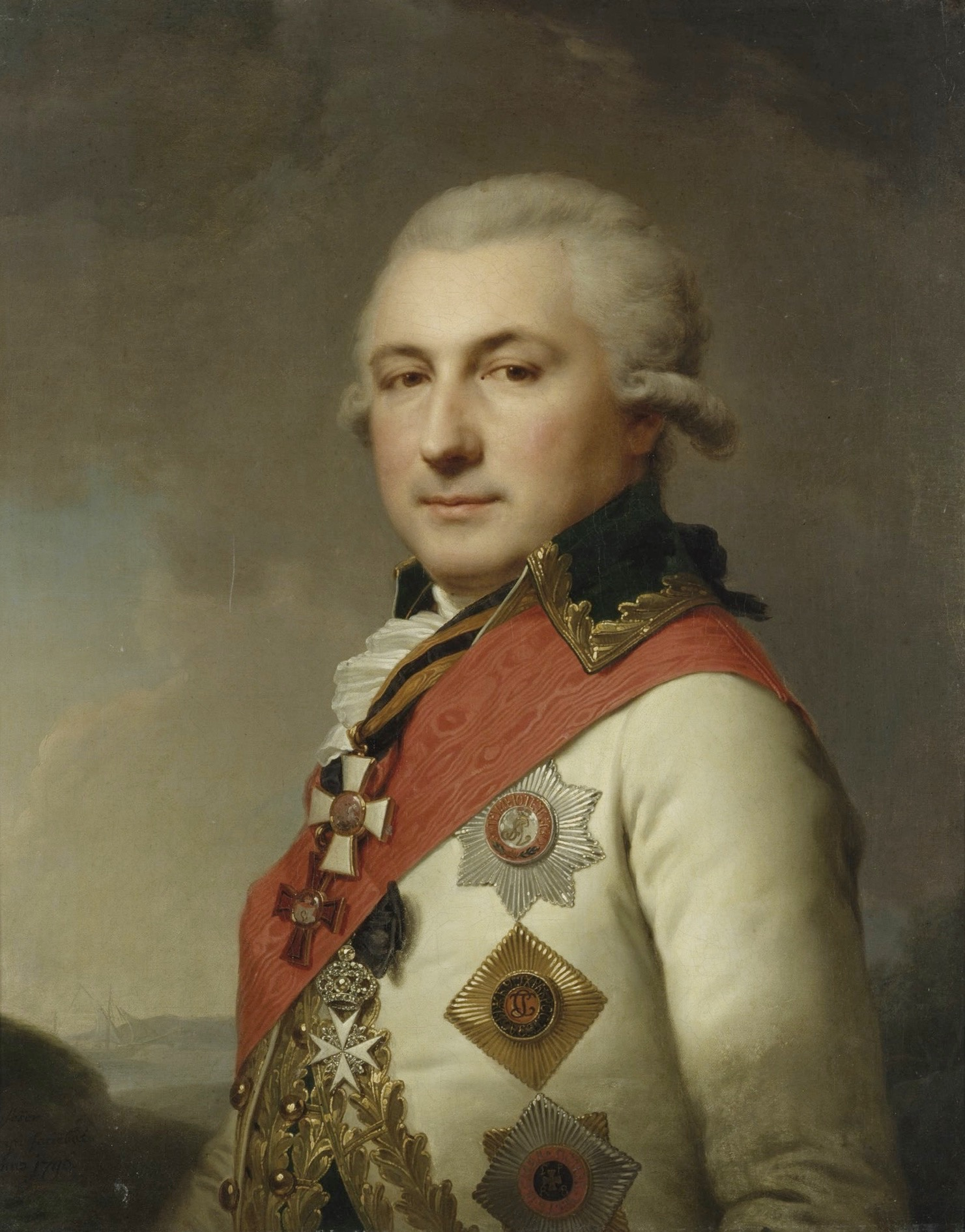
Osip Mikhailovich de Ribas

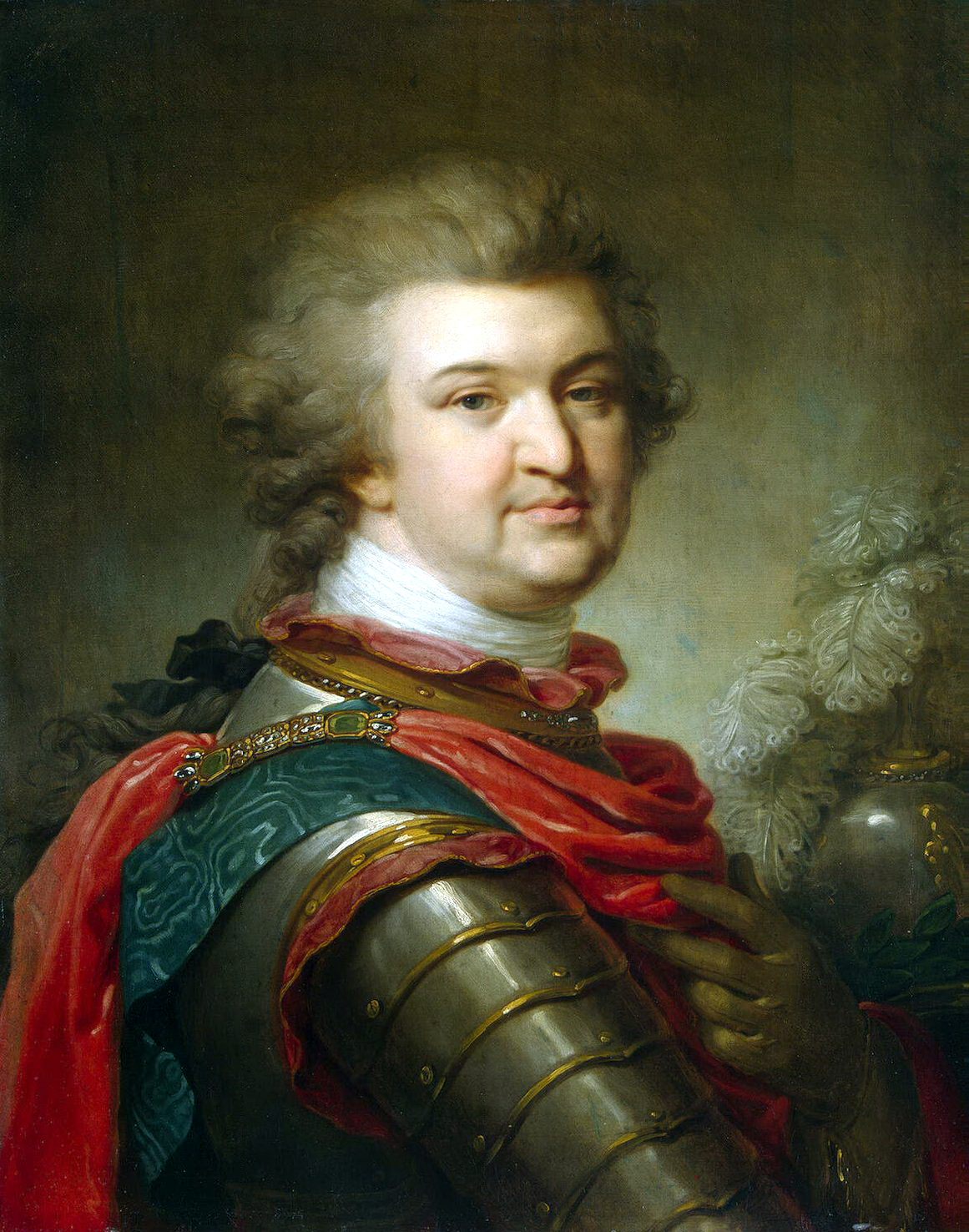
Prince Grigory Potemkin, 1790s; Hermitage Museum
