= Stepan Akimov House =

- Доходный дом Степана Акимова
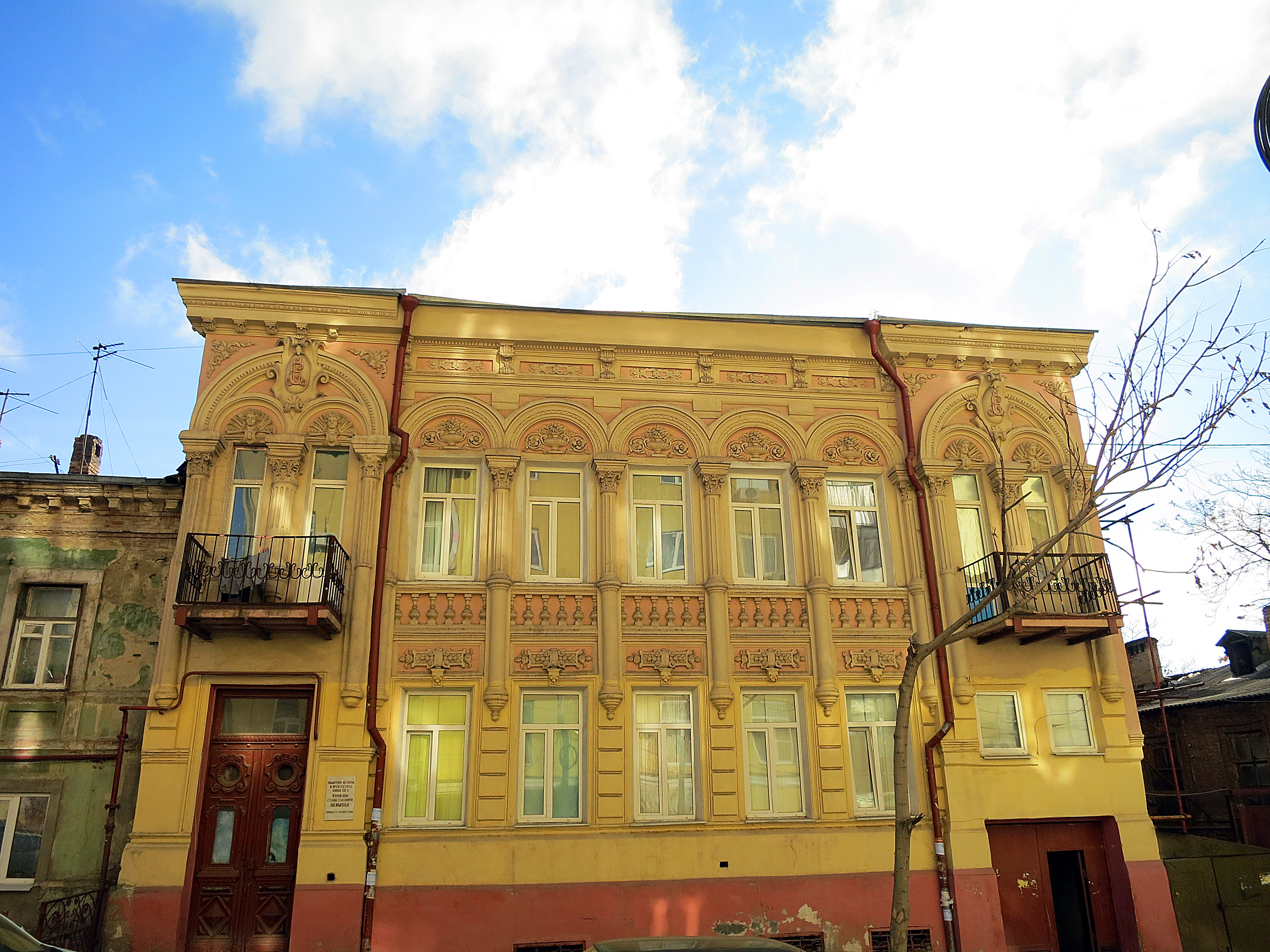
- 47.2152°N 39.7133°E
- Location: Ulyanovskaya street, 14, Rostov-on-Don, Rostov oblast Russia

The Stepan Akimov House (Russian: Доходный дом Степана Акимова) is an object of cultural heritage of regional significance Rostov-on-Don, which is located at 14 Ulyanovskaya Street. On the facade of the building there is a plaque with information about the owner of the house – Stepan Akimov. Among many residents of the city there is a rumor that this house is connected with the Paramonov family, but this information did not find any official confirmation.

== History and description ==
Stepan Akimov was born in 1854. His relatives owned the estate, which was located on the corner of Kankrinsky Street and Soborny Pereulok. The estate was divided into two parts: according to the law, one part owned by Love, Catherine and Ivan Akimov. And the other part belonged to Stepan Akimov, who at that time already had a wife Maria and a daughter named Anna. The house brought 80 rubles of annual income. In 1899, Stepan Akimov received permission to build a two-story house with a basement. At that time, the house was located at: Kankrinskaya Street, 26. The house brought an annual income of 390 rubles. In 1911 he became the property of Akimov's daughter – Anna Stepanovna Akimova. In 1920, the house was partially destroyed due to the projectile getting into it: a blast wave was broken glass, a roof was broken, cracks appeared on the walls. Because of this, the building began to deteriorate further. In March 1922, a resident of the Voronezh province, Nikolai Korolkov agreed to buy real estate, which was valued at 300 million rubles. He could not restore the house completely. After municipalization, the former owner sought to return the building to his property, but there are no facts that would confirm that he managed to achieve this. The house needs restoration works.

The house was decorated with cartouches with monograms "SA" (Russian: СА), which were the initials of the owner of this house. Under them were small images of Aphrodite. Behind each head on the facade of the building was depicted a sea shell – it allows you to identify the mythological character on the facade of the building. Refers to the number of architectural monuments of pre-revolutionary buildings.
