= Pietro Ferrero (disambiguation) =

Pietro Ferrero may refer to:

- Pietro Ferrero (1898–1949), Italian businessman
- Pietro Ferrero Jr. (1963–2011), Italian businessman
- Pietro Ferrero (anarchist) (1892–1922), Italian anarchist
- Pietro Ferrero (footballer) (1905–?), Italian football player
