= Wojciech Stattler =

Polish artist (1800–1875)

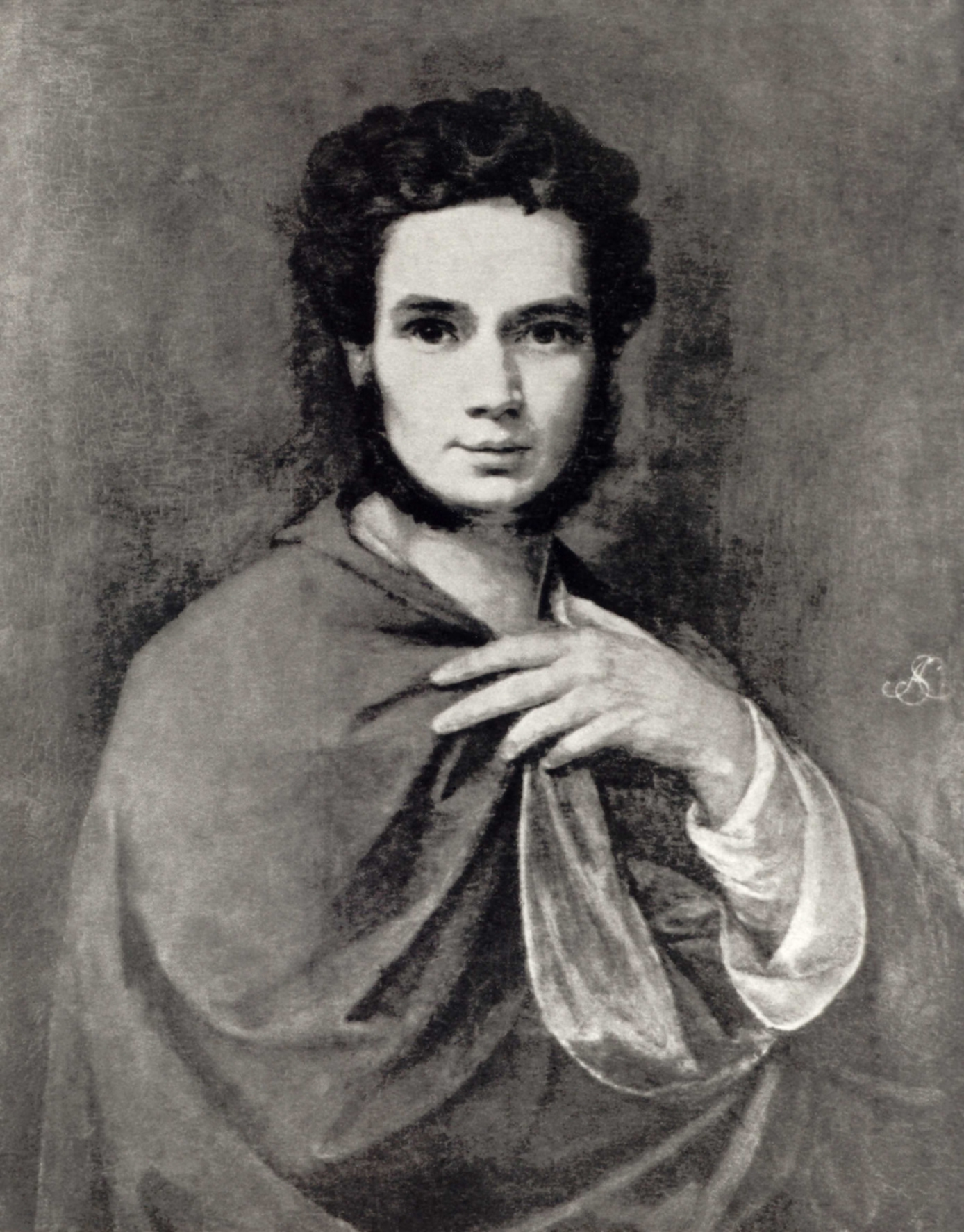
- Stattler, Self-portrait, 1828; oil painting stolen in World War II
- Born: 20 April 1800; Kraków, Poland
- Died: 6 November 1875 (aged 75); Warsaw, Poland

Wojciech Korneli Stattler or Albert Kornel Stattler (20 April 1800 – 6 November 1875) was a Polish Romantic painter of Swiss aristocratic ancestry, who started training in Vienna and at age 17 went to St. Luke's Academy in Rome. From 1831 he taught as professor at the School of Fine Arts in Kraków. 1850 he returned to Rome. His most famous pupil was Poland's leading painter of historical figures and events, Jan Matejko.

== Early years ==
Stattler was born in Kraków five years after the third of the military partitions of Poland by the three neighbouring Empires and the suppression of the Polish Kościuszko Uprising by the occupying forces. He was the son of city councilor Joachim Stattler, deputy to the Sejm of Kraków, City which became part of the Austrian Empire. Stattler began his studies in 1816, initially in the field of mathematics and natural sciences. A year later, he enrolled at the drawing class of the School of Fine Arts and made quick progress in the workshops of professors Antoni Brodowski, Józef Peszka and Franciszek Lampi. In 1818–27 he went to Italy, and continued his art studies at the Accademia di San Luca in Rome under Andrea Pozzi and privately with Vincenzo Camuccini and Bertel Thorvaldsen; as well as at the Academy of Vienna since 1822 under Antonio Canova. During 1819–25 he was the recipient of state scholarships.

== Artistic career ==
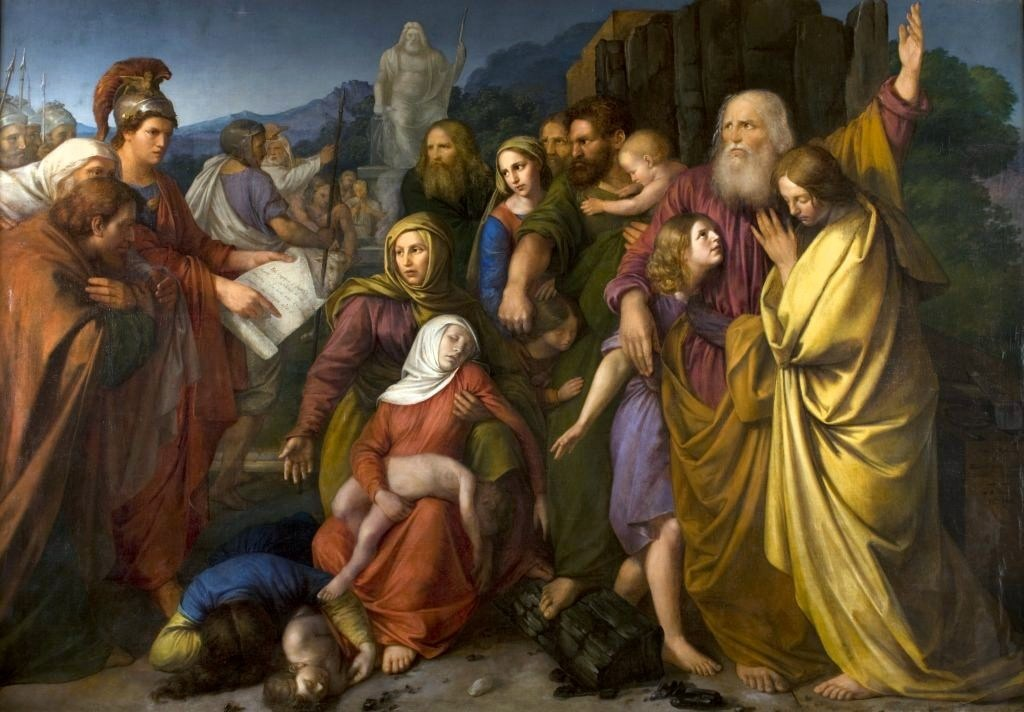
Maccabees, 1830–1842, oil on canvas, 262 x 371 cm

Upon his return from abroad, Stattler was appointed Professor of the School of Fine Arts in Kraków in 1831. Just before that, in 1829 he was in Łańcut at the estate of Count Aleksander Potocki, portraying members and children of his family and receiving a salary. In 1830 he was in Puławy, where he made preparatory sketches for a portrait of Prince Adam Czartoryski. Back in Kraków, he embarked on a programme of dramatic changes at the School of Fine Arts, introducing live model studies as well as nude art models.

Stattler travelled abroad frequently. He was friends with Juliusz Słowacki, Aleksander Fredro, Antoni Odyniec and prominent others, including Adam Mickiewicz with whom he corresponded. He painted their portraits. During Stattler's stay in Vienna as guest of Konstanty Czartoryski, he met an Italian-born Klementyna Zerboni di Colonna (c.1804–1897), also referred to as Katarzyna Zerboni by others. Mickiewicz himself attended their wedding, which took place in 1830 in her native Rome.

Stattler went to France in 1843–44 with his painting Maccabees (Machabeusze), which won the Louis Philippe Gold Medal, at the Paris Salon. Working on-and-off, it took him 12 years to complete it. Juliusz Słowacki described it as the Polish epic in Roman costume, with Antiochus demanding submission and subservience from the Jews like Russians from the Poles in the November Uprising. This painting is currently on display at the National Museum, Kraków.

Stattler served as Professor of the Academy for 26 years, until 1857. He also wrote articles and papers on art and art-education, including a memoir (Pamiętnik) published decades later by Maciej Szukiewicz in 1916. Stattlers had a son, Henryk, born in 1834. Financial needs prompted them to leave Kraków for Warsaw around 1870, nevertheless Stattler refused the lucrative offer to paint 50 copies of the Russian Tsar Alexander. He painted religious themes in his old age and died in Warsaw on 6 November 1875. He was buried at the Powązki Cemetery.

== Selected portraiture ==
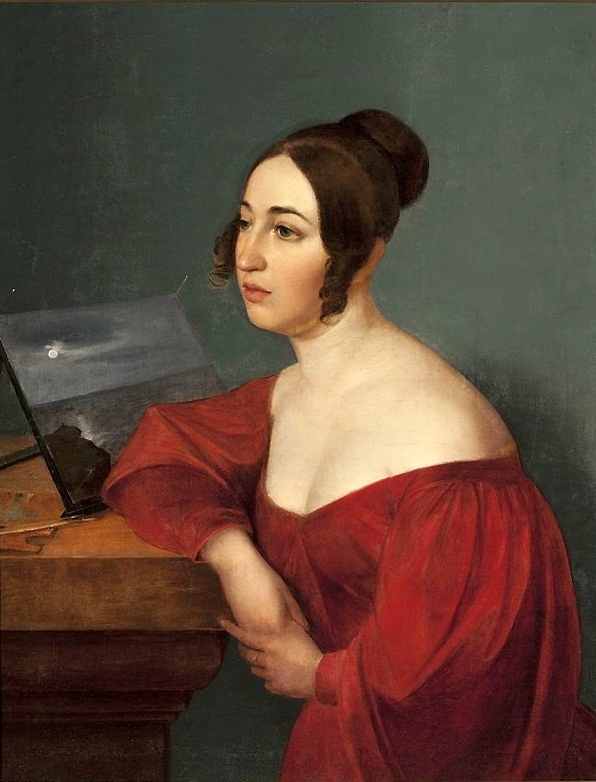
Hortensja Sobańska, 1836

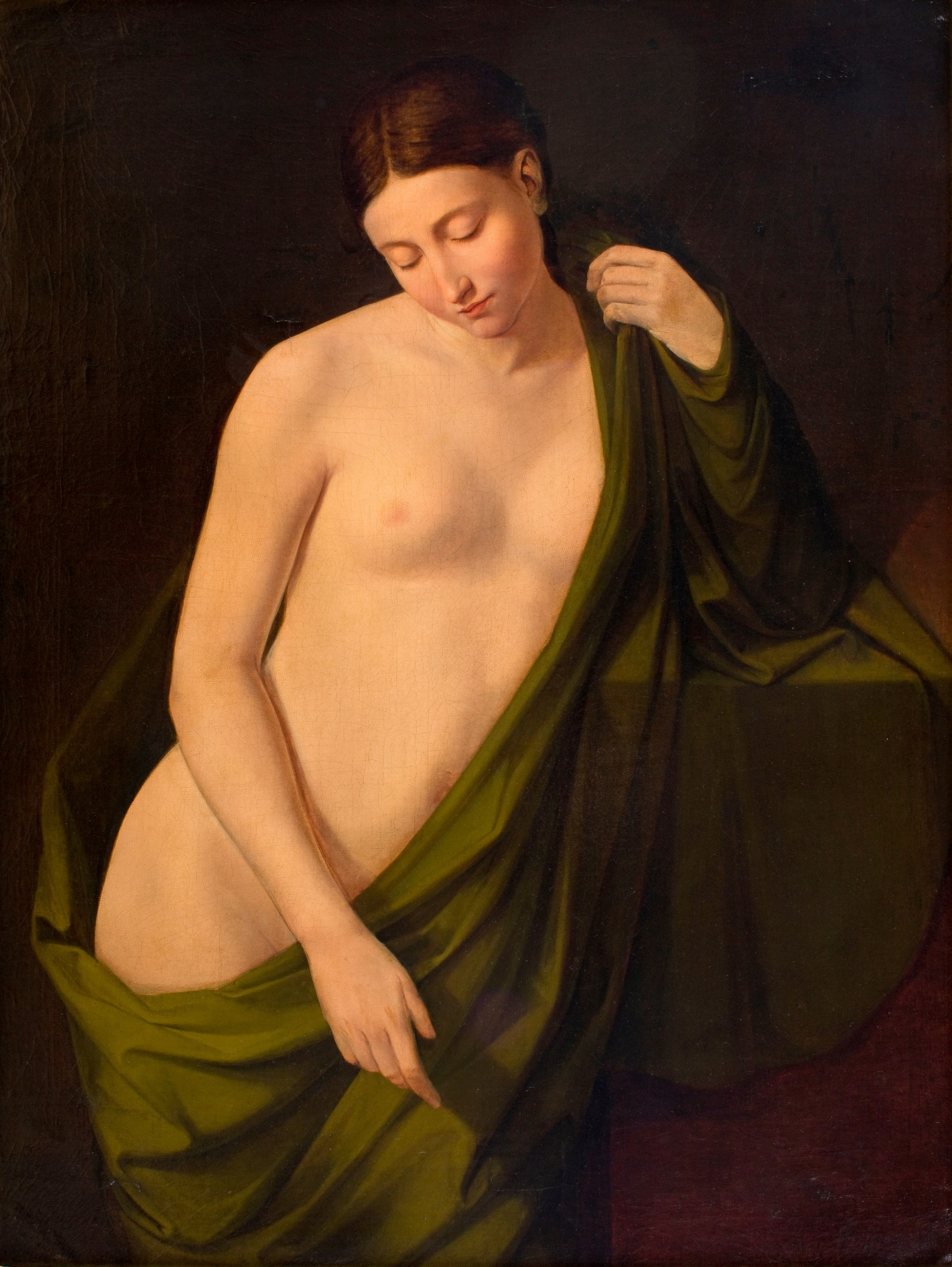
Nude study, 1830

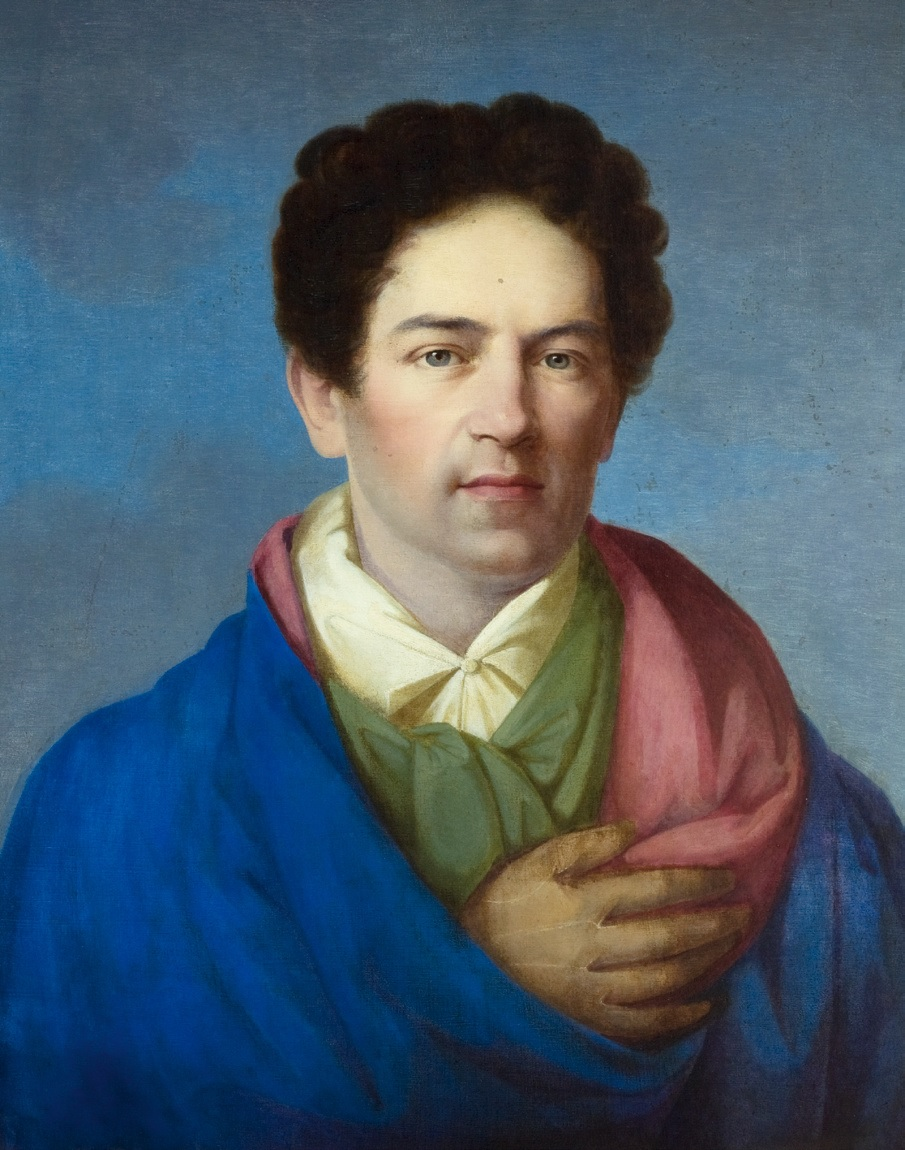
Karol Soczyński, 1824

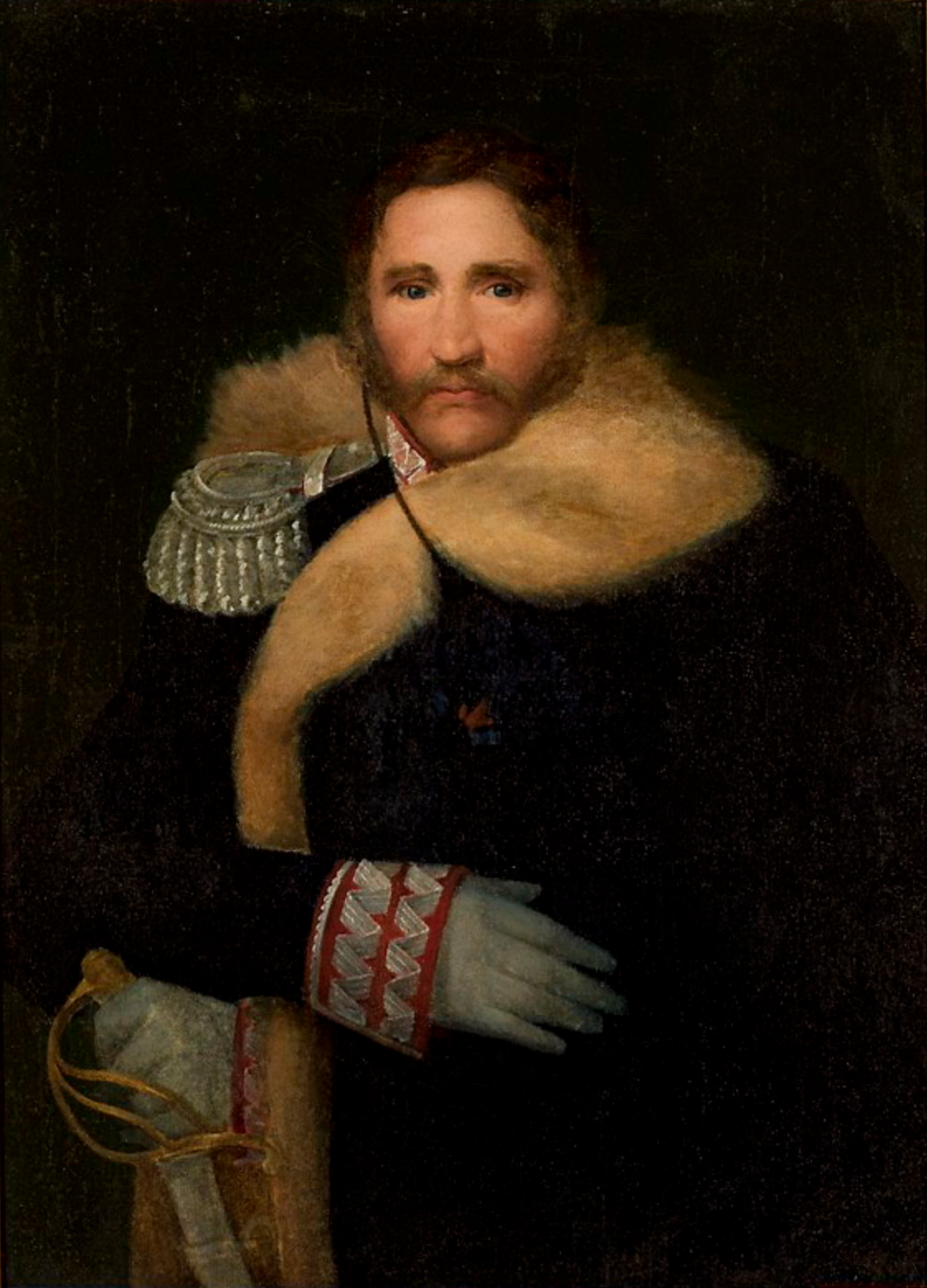
Henryk Dembiński, 1850
