= Pietra =

Pietra means "stone" in Italian language. It is also rarely used as a given name (feminine of Pietro, Peter), corresponding at almost to Petra. It may refer to:

== People ==
- Pietra Brettkelly (born 1965), New Zealand film director
- Pietra Montecorvino (born 1962), Italian singer and actress
- Pietra Rivoli (born 1950s), American economist
- Pietra (surname), an Italian surname

== Other uses ==
- Pietra Brewery, a Corsican brewery
- La Pietra, a school in Honolulu, Hawaii

== See also ==
- Peter Pietras (1908–1993), American soccer player
- Pietro, given name
- Pietrari (disambiguation)
- Petra, a city in Jordan
- Petra (disambiguation)
