= Portrait of the Mozart Family =

1780–1781 family portrait

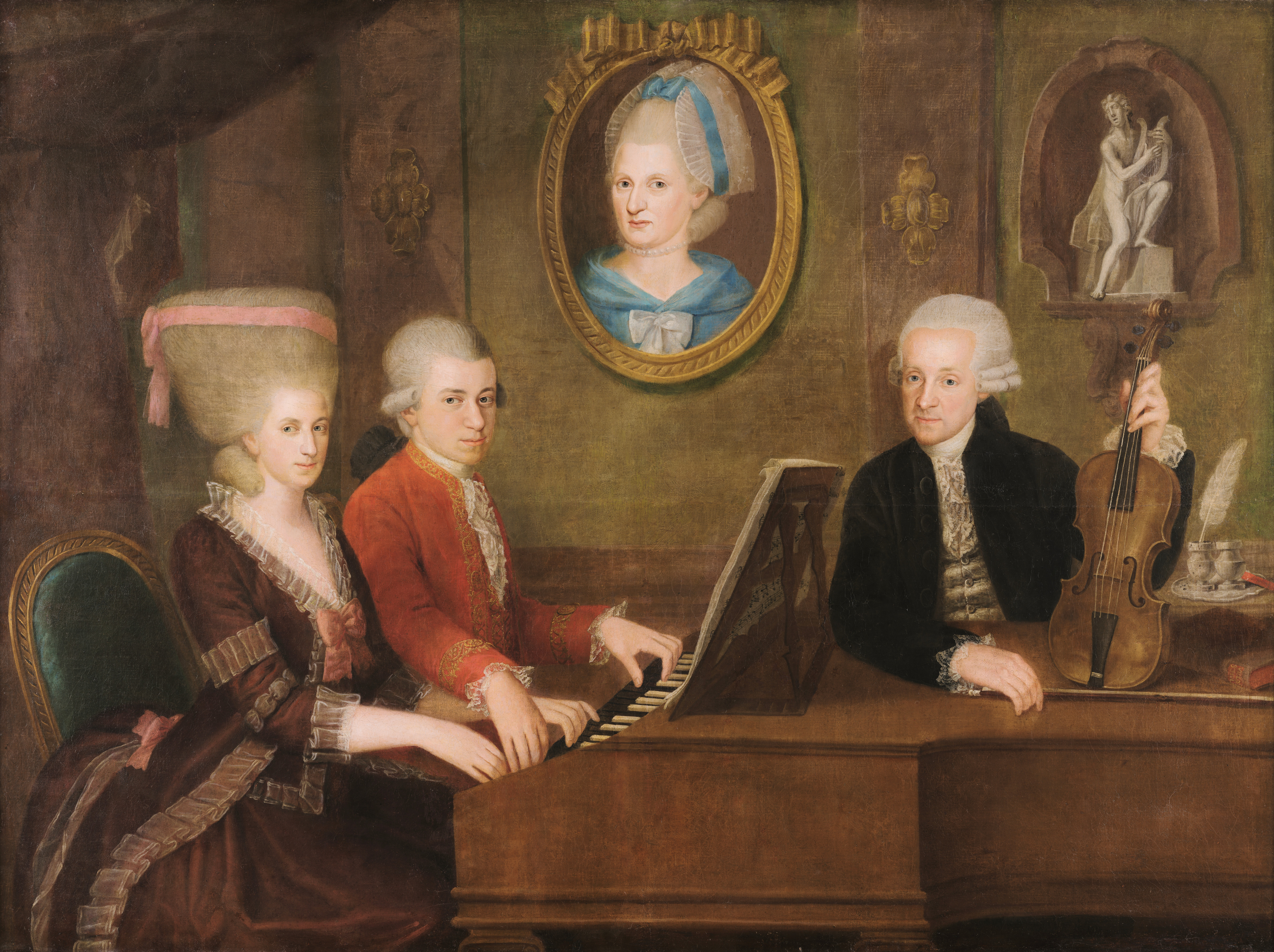
- Artist: attrib. Johann Nepomuk della Croce
- Year: 1780–1781
- Medium: Oil on canvas
- Subject: Mozart family (left to right): Marianne Mozart; Wolfgang Amadeus Mozart; Anna Maria Mozart; Leopold Mozart
- Dimensions: 140.4 cm × 187.6 cm (55.3 in × 73.9 in)
- Location: Tanzmeisterhaus, Salzburg
- Accession: F 000.291

Portrait of the Mozart Family (Note: Also known simply as Mozart Family (German: Familie Mozart)) is an oil painting of four members of the Mozart family created between late 1780 and early 1781 and traditionally attributed to Johann Nepomuk della Croce. The painting depicts in the foreground the siblings Wolfgang Amadeus and Maria Anna "Marianne" together playing a fortepiano, and their father Leopold holding a violin. In the background, the recently deceased mother Anna Maria is depicted in a framed portrait alongside a sculpture of Apollo playing a lyre. The painting was considered by Marianne to have the most authentic portrait of her brother and has inspired further depictions of the artist. It is currently kept in the Tanzmeisterhaus museum in Salzburg, Austria.

== Commission ==
The Mozarts commissioned the family portrait during the summer or autumn of 1780 and sittings were concluded by the end of the same year. Wolfgang asked about the painting in a letter to his father Leopold on 13 November 1780:

What about the family portrait? Is it a good likeness of you? Has the painter started on my sister yet?

— Wolfgang Amadeus Mozart

Leopold answered in a letter from 20 November, explaining how Wolfgang's sister Marianne was unable to attend sittings due to sickness:

You ask how the family portrait is turning out? So far nothing more has been done to it. Either I have had no time to sit, or the painter could not arrange a sitting; and now your sister is laid up with a cold and cannot leave the house.

— Leopold Mozart

After recovering, she attended two more sittings by 8 January the next year, which she mentioned in letters to her brother.

== Composition ==
The painting depicts three living members of the Mozart family inside a room holding instruments, with a framed portrait of Wolfgang's mother Anna Maria Mozart, who had died in July 1778, hung above them. Accompanying Anna Maria's portrait in the background is a sculpture of Apollo playing a lyre. A curtain separates the background and foreground, where the three living Mozarts are depicted. On the left, Marianne and Wolfgang are playing a fortepiano together in the à quatre mains style. The fortepiano may be the same as the one kept in the Tanzmeisterhaus Salzburg which was built by Anton Walter. To the right of them, Leopold is holding a violin.

== Attribution ==
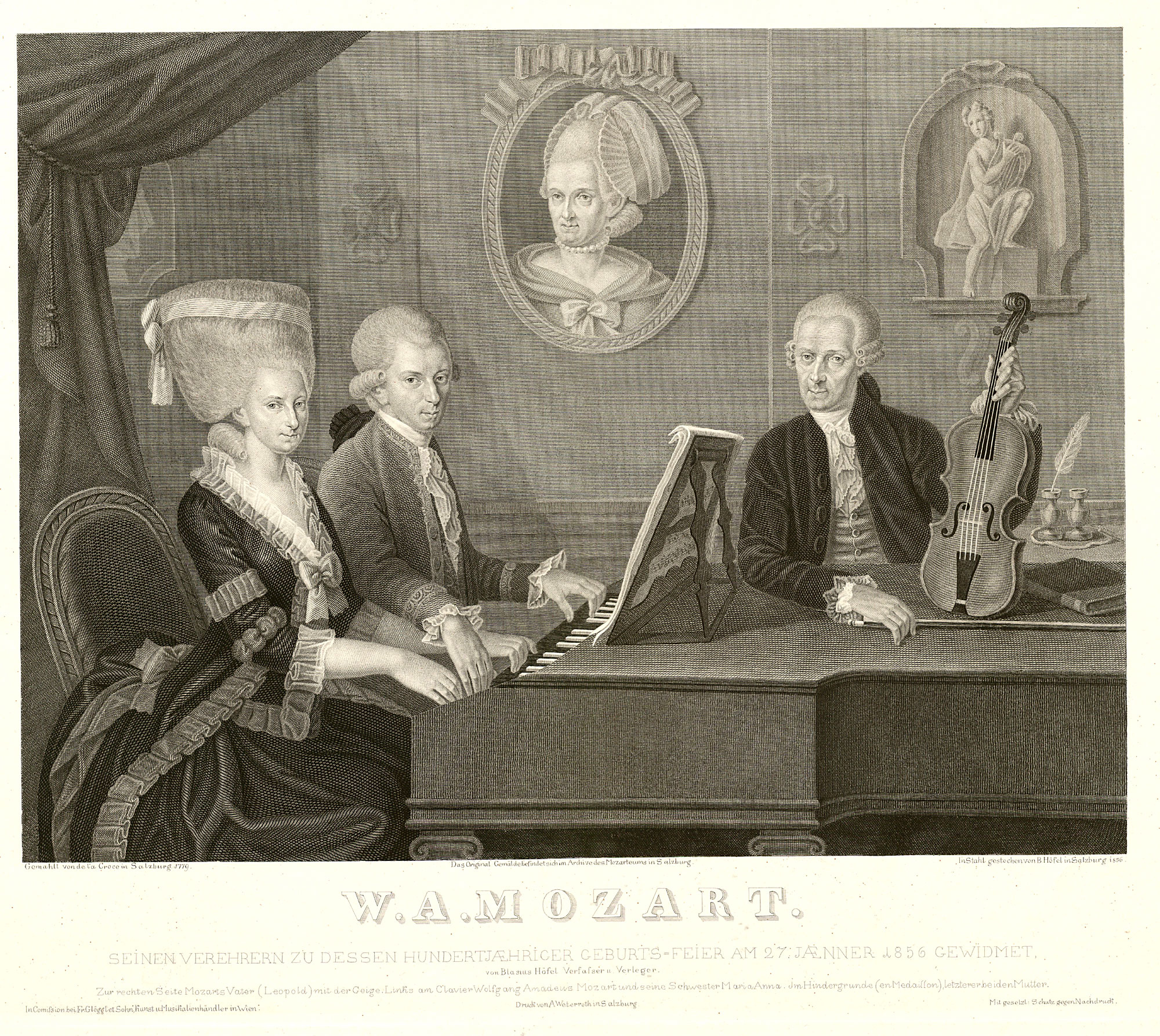
The engraving by Höfel from which attribution of the painting is generally derived, 1852

Johann Nepomuk della Croce was a prolific Austrian painter who was active in Salzburg during the late 18th century. The Mozart family portrait has been traditionally attributed to della Croce since at least 1856, when Blasius Höfel produced an engraving of the portrait which credited della Croce in its title, although there is a lack of contemporary documentation definitively proving him as the painter of the portrait.

== Legacy ==
Marianne would later call the painting the best likeness of Wolfgang she knew. Edward Speyer of The Musical Quarterly called the portrait "by far the most authentic and life-like representation of [Wolfgang] Mozart, both on account of its known history and also because of its artistic excellence." The painting inspired further artists in depicting Wolfgang, including Barbara Krafft, who used it as the basis for her portrait.
