= Ivan Akimov =

Russian painter (1755–1814)

- Иван Акимов
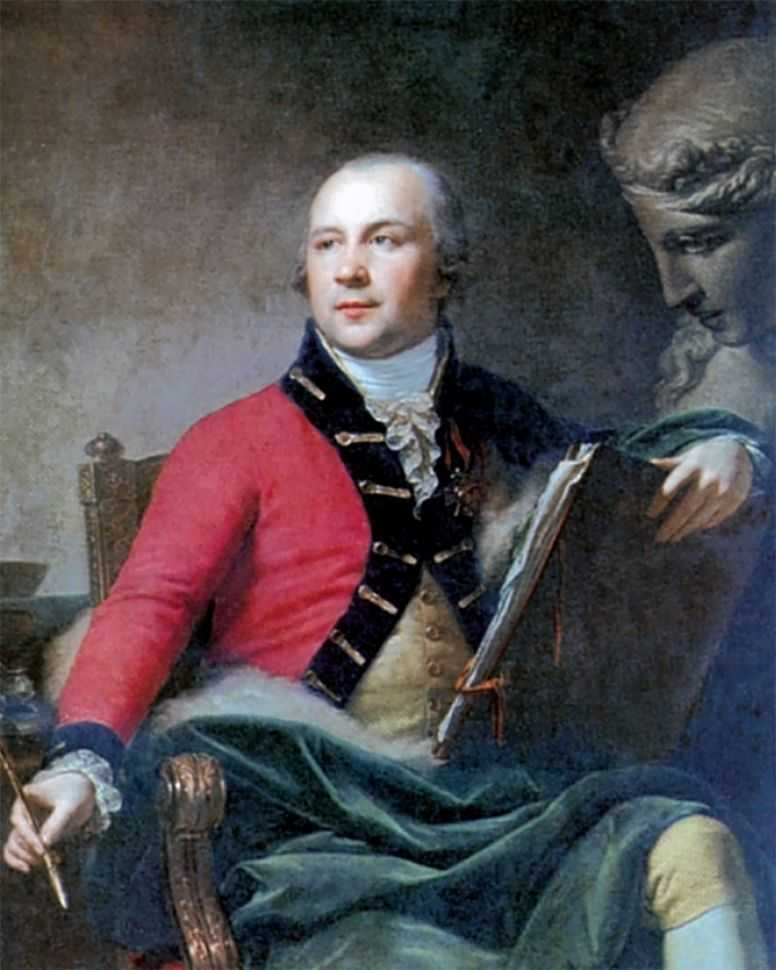
- Portrait by Johann Baptist von Lampi the Younger, 1796, oils; Museum of the Academy of Arts, St. Petersburg
- Born: May 22, 1755; Saint Petersburg
- Died: May 15, 1814 (aged 58); Saint Petersburg
- Resting place: Smolensky Cemetery, Saint Petersburg
- Education: Imperial Academy of Arts (1773)
- Known for: Painting
- Awards: Big Gold Medal of the Imperial Academy of Arts (1773)
- Elected: Member Academy of Arts (1782); Professor by rank Full Member Academy of Arts (1791)

Ivan Akimovich Akimov (Russian: Иван Акимович Акимов; 22 May 1755 – 15 May 1814) was a Russian painter in the Classical style.

== Biography ==
His father was a typographer and typesetter for the Governing Senate. At the age of ten, after his father's death, he wrote a letter to the Imperial Academy of Arts, requesting admission and pleading poverty. The letter was successful, and he was admitted. He was there from 1765 to 1773 and studied under Anton Losenko.

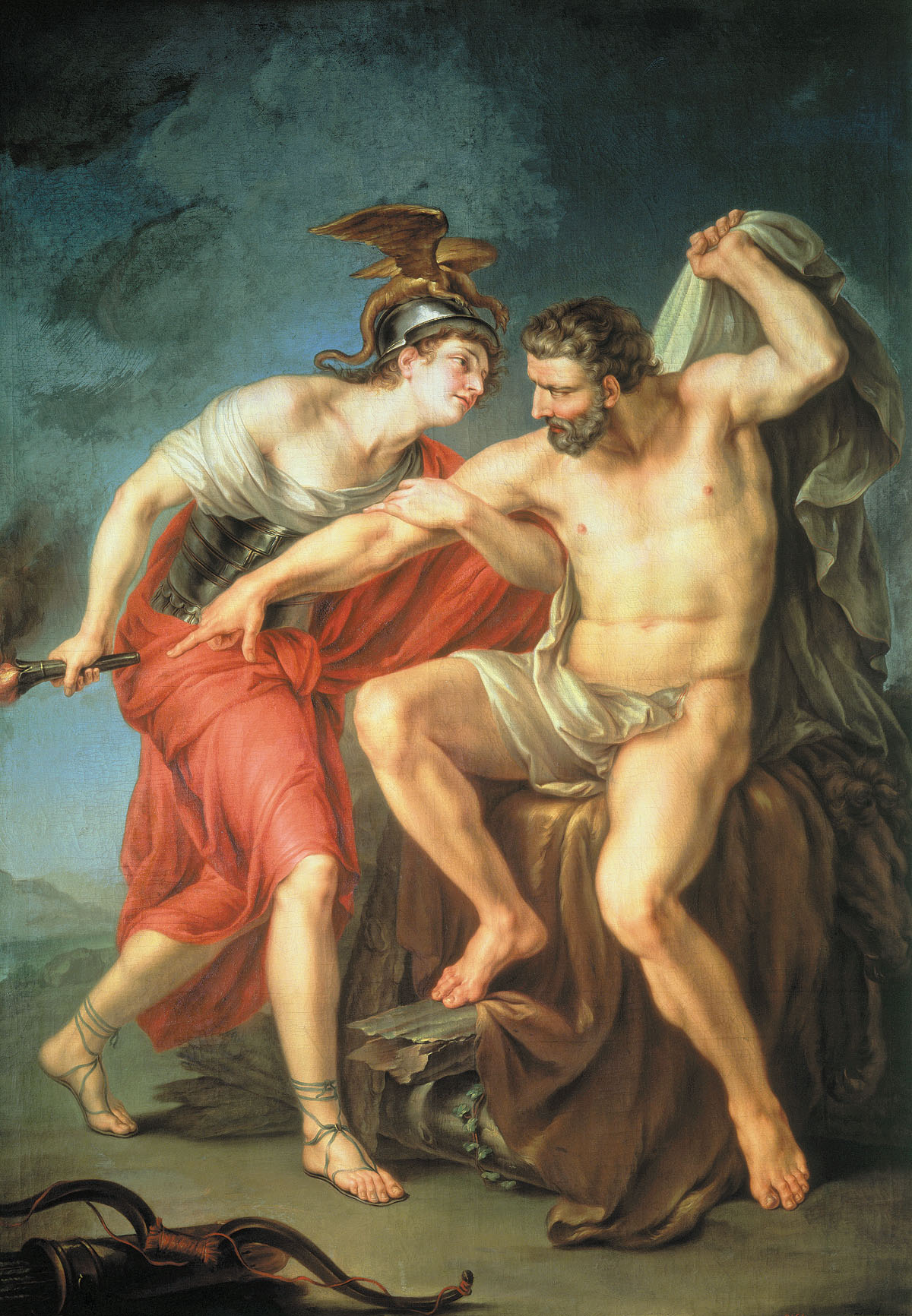
Hercules Burning Himself on a Pyre in the Presence of His Friend Philoctetes

During the years 1773 to 1778, he received a fellowship to study in Italy, going by way of Paris and Avignon and then to Genoa and Bologna, where he was enrolled at the Accademia di Belle Arti di Bologna under Gaetano Gandolfi. He found the teaching there unsatisfactory, however and, after numerous unanswered petitions to the Academy, moved to Rome without permission. He arrived there only to discover that their "Academy" was really an association of artists with private students. Thanks to a recommendation from a Russian nobleman residing in Italy, he was able enter the classes of Pompeo Battoni. Later, on orders from the Imperial Academy, he finished his course in Bologna, then lived successively in Rome, Venice and Florence. In 1779, he returned to Saint Petersburg and became a lecturer at the Academy. Three years later, he was named an Academician for his painting of Hercules burning himself on a pyre.

=== Later achievements ===
In 1785, he was promoted to Associate Professor and, in 1791, he was appointed Director of the Imperial Tapestry Manufactory. He also taught drawing to Tsar Paul I's daughters. Three years later, he rose to Associate Director of the Academy and, finally, became the Director in 1800. In the following years, he turned to painting more contemporary historical scenes, under patriotic pressure from the war with Napoleon. They were not highly thought of, but cannot be judged now because few have survived.

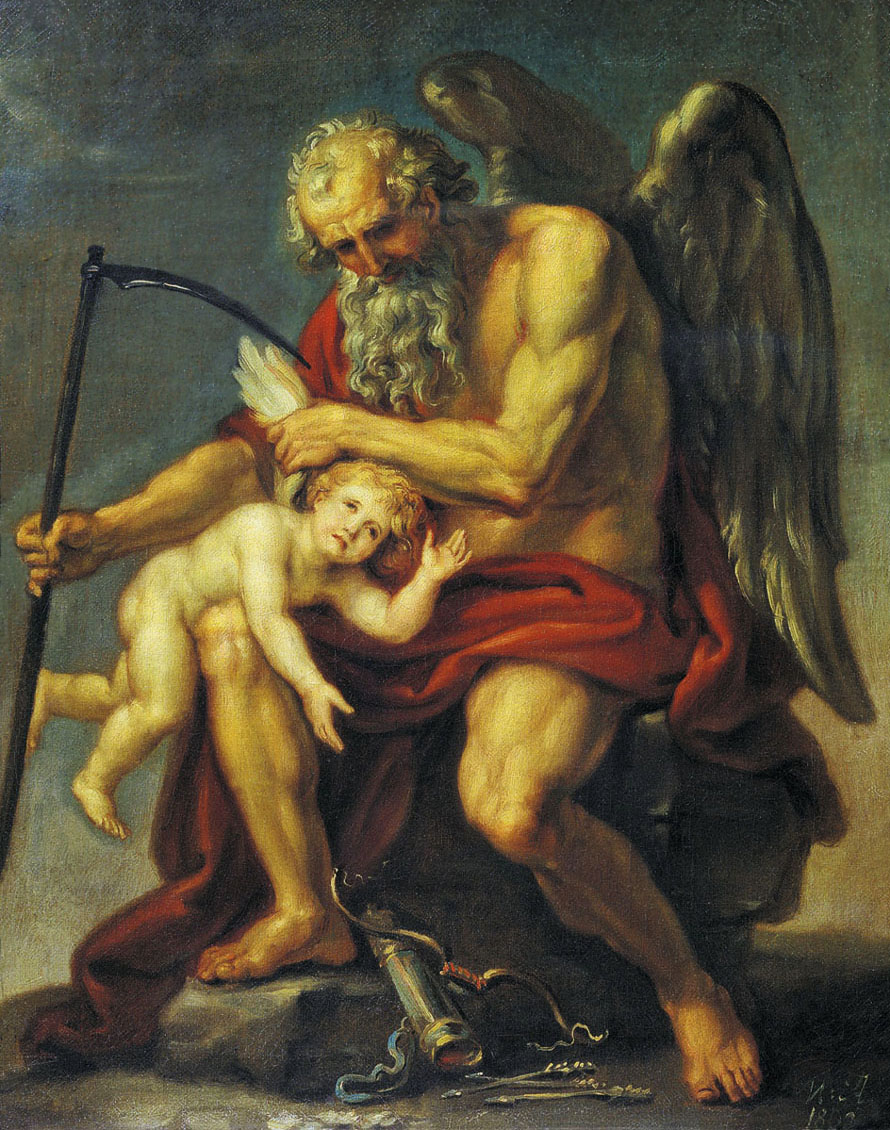
Saturn Clipping the Wings of Cupid (1802)

Although he is not considered to be a first-rate artist, he had a special talent for teaching and was a great influence on Russian history painting. Among his best-known students are Andrey Ivanovich Ivanov, Vasily Shebuyev and Alexei Yegorov. Alexander Stupin (who would later establish his own art school) actually boarded with Akimov and his family.

He was also one of the founders of Russian art historiography, beginning with his article "Brief Historical Information About Some Russian Artists" in the 1804 edition of Severny Vestnik. In his will, he bequeathed 15,000 Rubles to the Academy.
