= Pietro Bianchi =

Pietro Bianchi may refer to:

- Pietro Bianchi (gymnast) (1883–1965), Italian gymnast
- Pietro Bianchi (painter) (1694–1740), Italian painter
- Pietro Bianchi (weightlifter) (1895–1962), Italian weightlifter
- Pietro Bianchi (basketball), see Rosters of the top basketball teams in European club competitions
