= Pietro Ferrero (footballer) =

Italian footballer

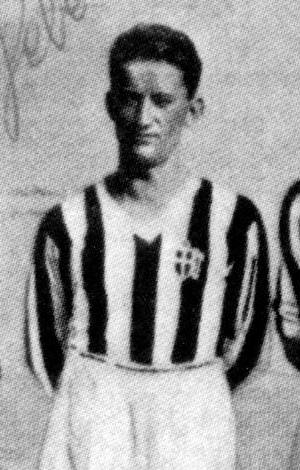
- Ferrero with Juventus in the 1932–33 season

Personal information
- Date of birth: April 23, 1905
- Place of birth: Turin, Italy
- Position: Defender

Senior career*
Years	Team	Apps	(Gls)
1926–1934	Juventus	93	(8)
1934–1935	Sampierdarenese	14	(0)
- * Club domestic league appearances and goals

Pietro Ferrero (born April 23, 1905 in Turin, date of death unknown) was an Italian professional football player. He played for 8 seasons for Juventus F.C., but only had one start. He was in four championship teams.

== Honours ==
- Serie A champion: 1930/31, 1931/32, 1932/33, 1933/34.
