= Pietro Antonio Lorenzoni =

Austrian painter (1721-1782)

Pietro Antonio Lorenzoni (Cles in Tyrol, 1721 – Salzburg, 1782) was an Austrian painter who is believed to have painted several portraits of Wolfgang Amadeus Mozart and his family: "The Boy Mozart" (1763), his sister Maria Anna Mozart in "Nannerl as a Child" (1763) and a portrait of their father Leopold Mozart (c. 1765). He arrived in Salzburg, Austria in the 1740s and first wanted to paint Wolfgang and Nannerl. His nephew and protégé, Johann Nepomuk della Croce, painted a Mozart family portrait in 1780.

Lorenzoni was cousin to painter Johann Baptist von Lampi the Elder; additionally, his first cousins once removed included fellow painters Franciszek Ksawery Lampi and Johann Baptist von Lampi the Younger.

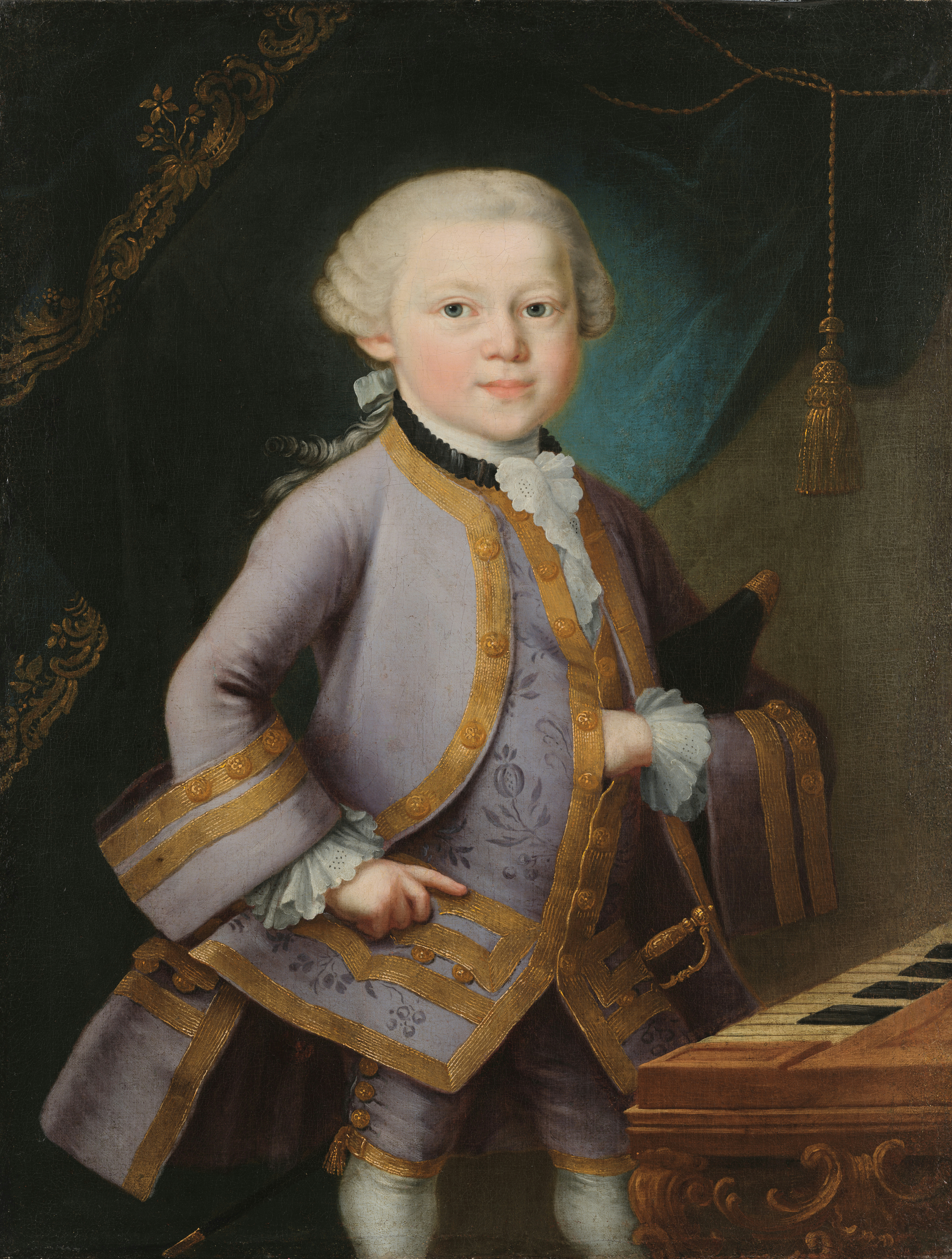
"Boy Mozart"

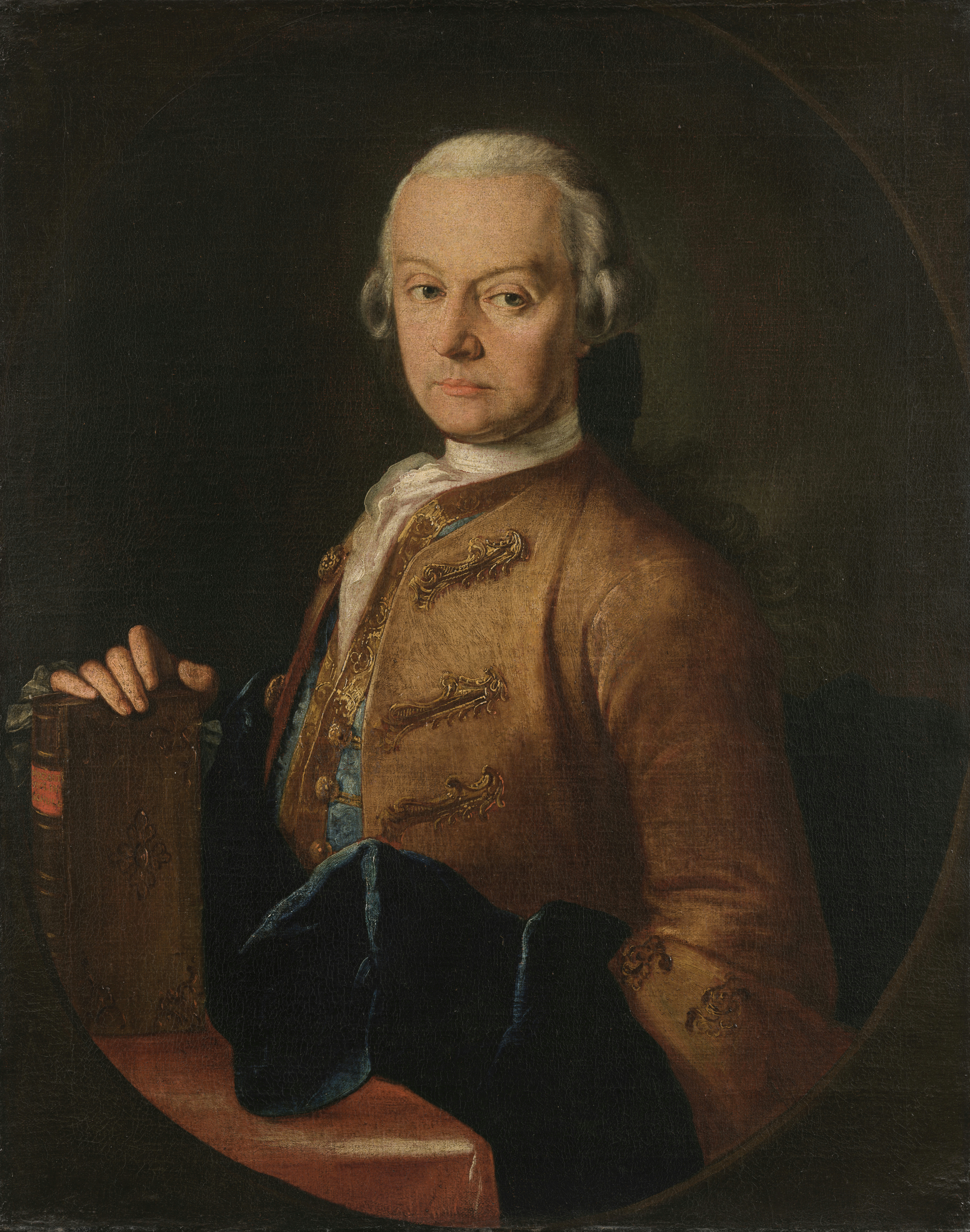
Portrait of Leopold Mozart

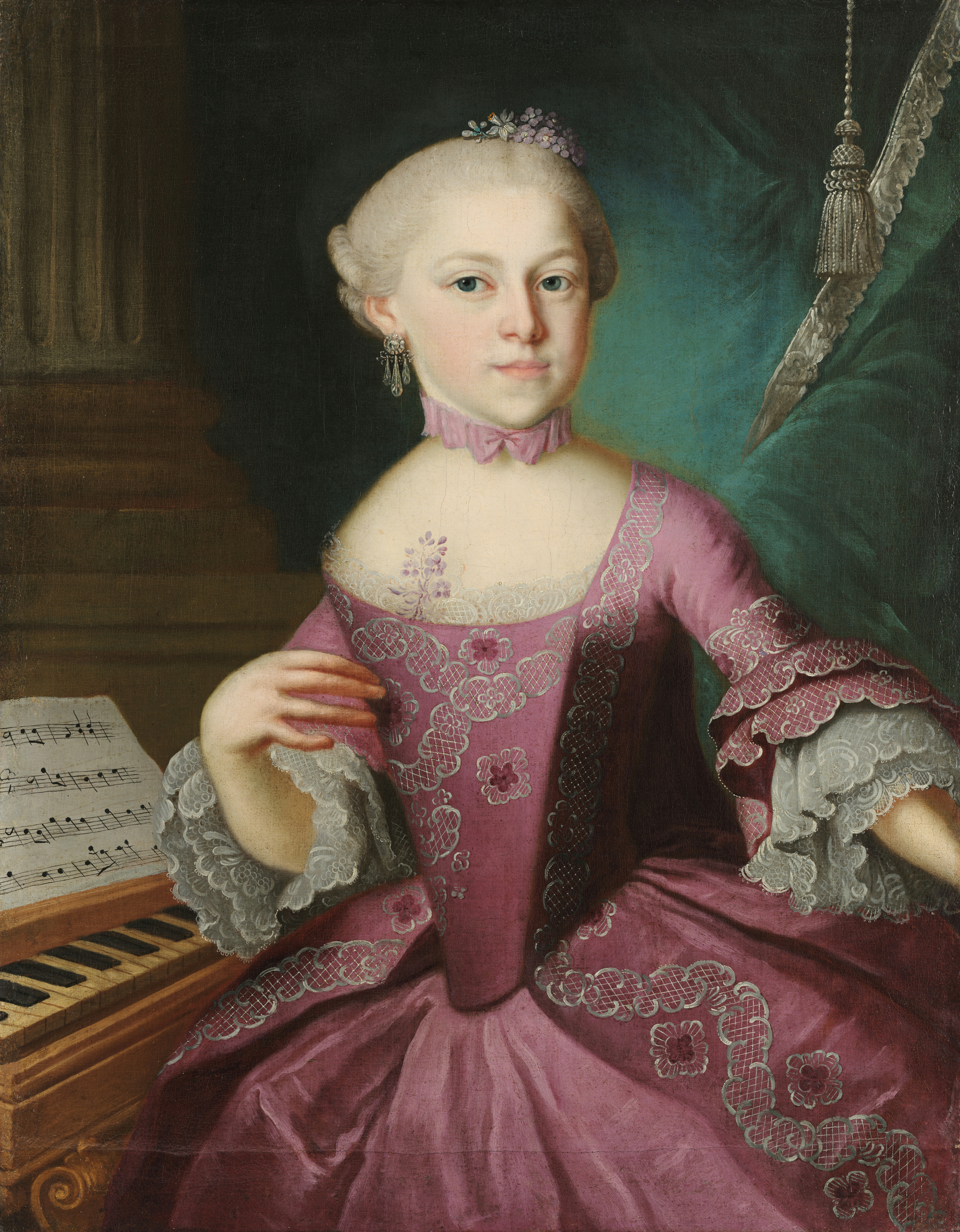
"Nannerl as a child"
