= Pietri =

Pietri or Piétri is a surname. Notable people with the surname include:

- Alicia Pietri Montemayor (1923–2011), wife of Venezuelan president Rafael Caldera
- Andrés Pietri Méndez, Venezuelan otorhinolaryngologist and philanthropist
- Annie Pietri (born 1956), French writer.
- Arturo Uslar Pietri, Venezuelan intellectual, lawyer, journalist, writer, television producer and politician
- A.S.D. Boca Pietri, Italian association football club from Bologna,
- Dorando Pietri, Italian athlete
- Eugenio de Bellard Pietri, Venezuelan speleologist
- François Piétri, French politician of the 20th century
- Frank Pietri, American Jazz Instructor, choreographer and performer
- Giuseppe Pietri (1886–1946), Italian composer
- Joseph Marie Piétri (1820–1902), French lawyer, public servant, police chief of Paris and senator
- Juan Pietri Pietri, Venezuelan militar
- Julie Pietri (born 1955), French pop singer
- Luis Geronimo Pietri, Venezuelan lawyer and politician
- Pedro Pietri, Nuyorican poet and playwright
- Pietro da Pietri, Italian painter of the late-Baroque period
- Rafael Pietri Oms, University of Puerto Rico chancellor
- Rick Pietri, head women's basketball coach at the University of South Alabama
- Robertino Pietri (born 1985), Grand Prix motorcycle racer from Venezuela
