= Pietro Ferrari (footballer, born 1906) =

Italian footballer

Personal information
- Date of birth: April 6, 1906
- Place of birth: Codevilla, Italy
- Date of death: ?
- Position: Midfielder

Senior career*
Years	Team	Apps	(Gls)
1927–1930	Derthona		
1930–1932	Roma	14	(3)
1932–1933	Derthona		
1933–1934	Casale	13	(0)
1934–1936	Derthona		
- * Club domestic league appearances and goals

Pietro Ferrari (Italian pronunciation: [ˈpjɛːtro ferˈraːri]; April 6, 1906 – ?) was an Italian professional football player.

He played for 3 seasons (27 games, 3 goals) in the Serie A for A.S. Roma and A.S. Casale Calcio.
