= Johann Nepomuk della Croce =

Austrian painter (1736–1819)

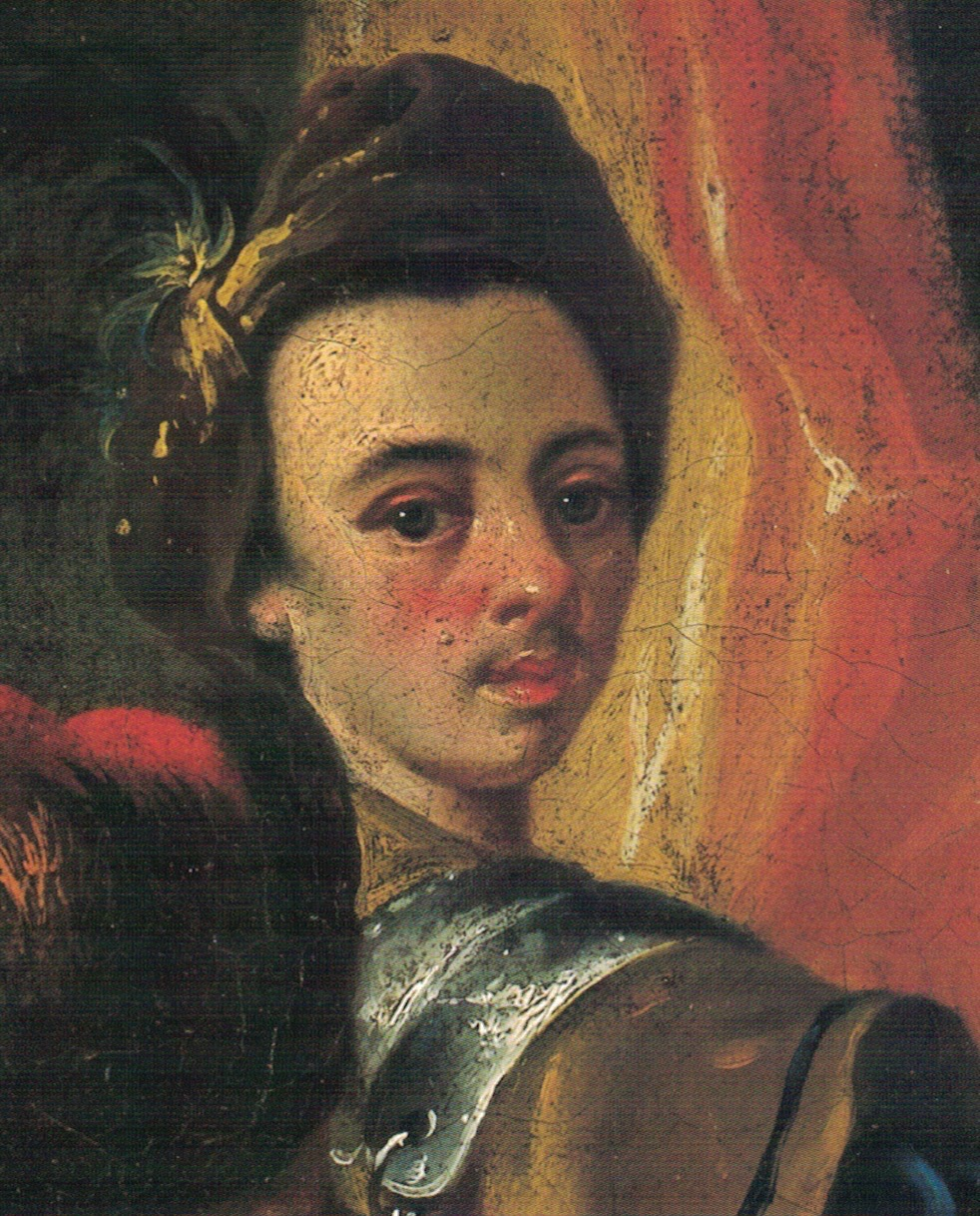
Self-portrait from 1762

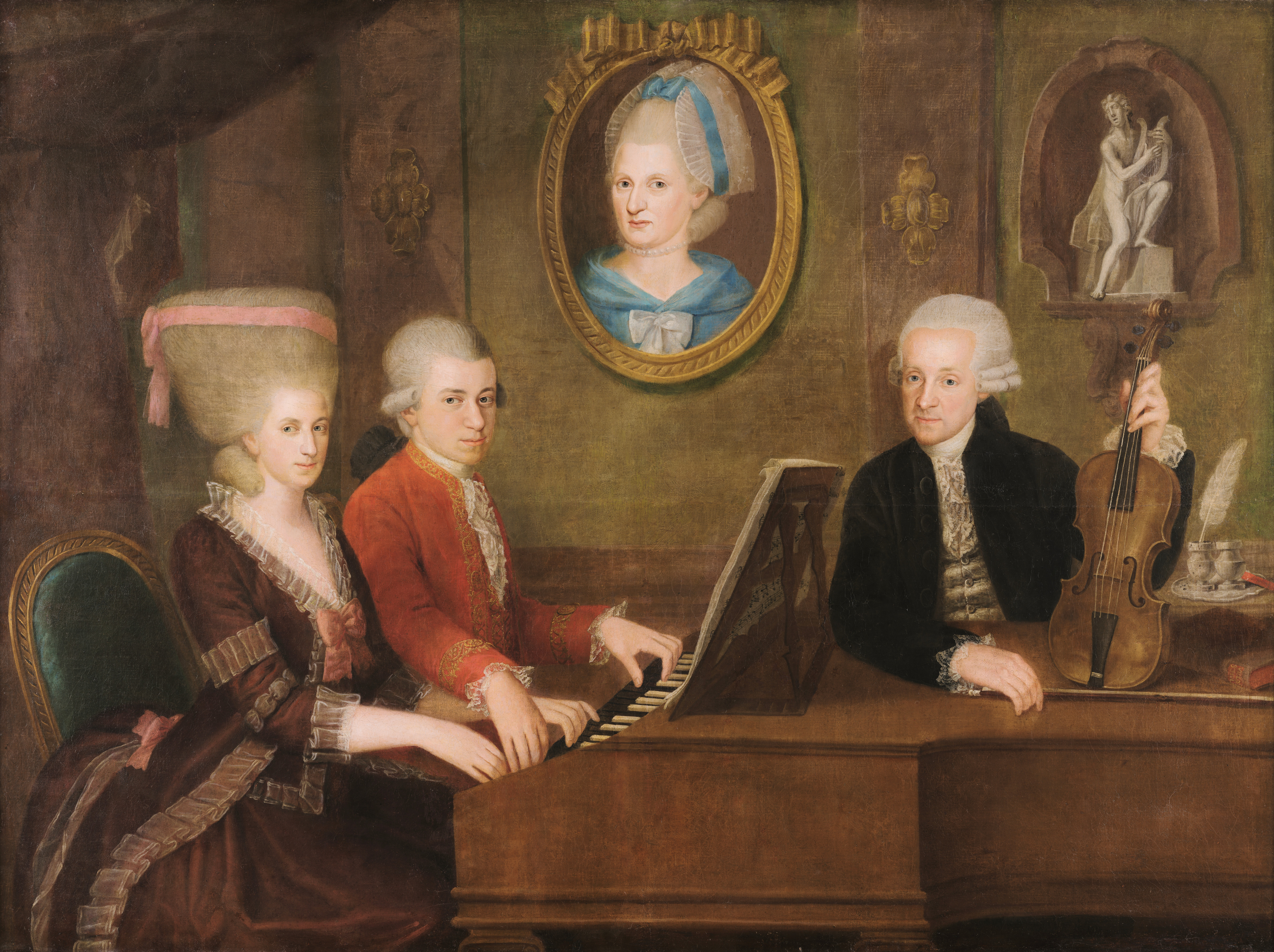
Portrait of the Mozart Family, c. 1780, traditionally attributed to him

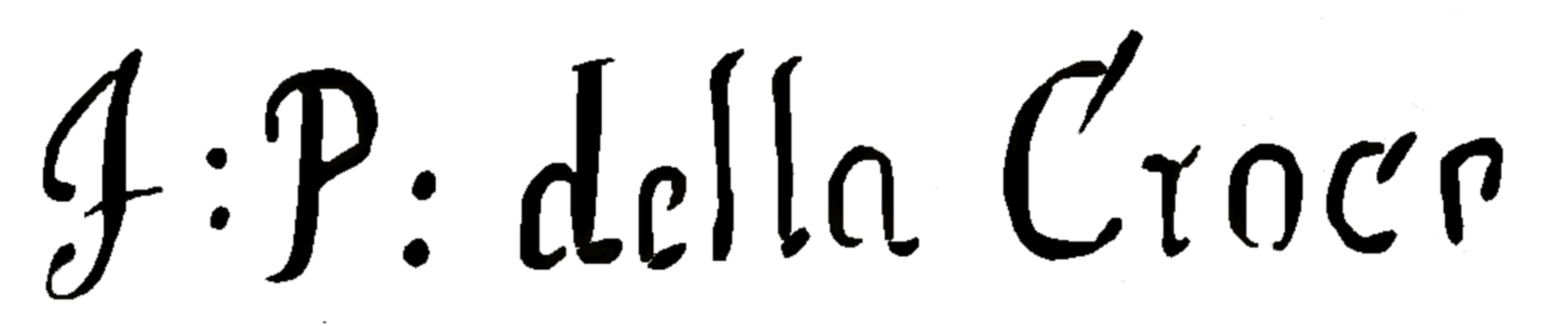

Johann Nepomuk della Croce (German: [ˈjoːhan ˈneːpomʊk ˌdɛla ˈkʁɔtʃə]; 7 August 1736 – 4 March 1819) was an Austrian painter, known in Italy as Giovanni Nepomuceno della Croce (Italian: [dʒoˈvanni nepomuˈtʃɛːno della ˈkroːtʃe]). He was active in both Germany and Trentino in a late-Baroque style, depicting portraits and religious subjects.

== Life and career ==
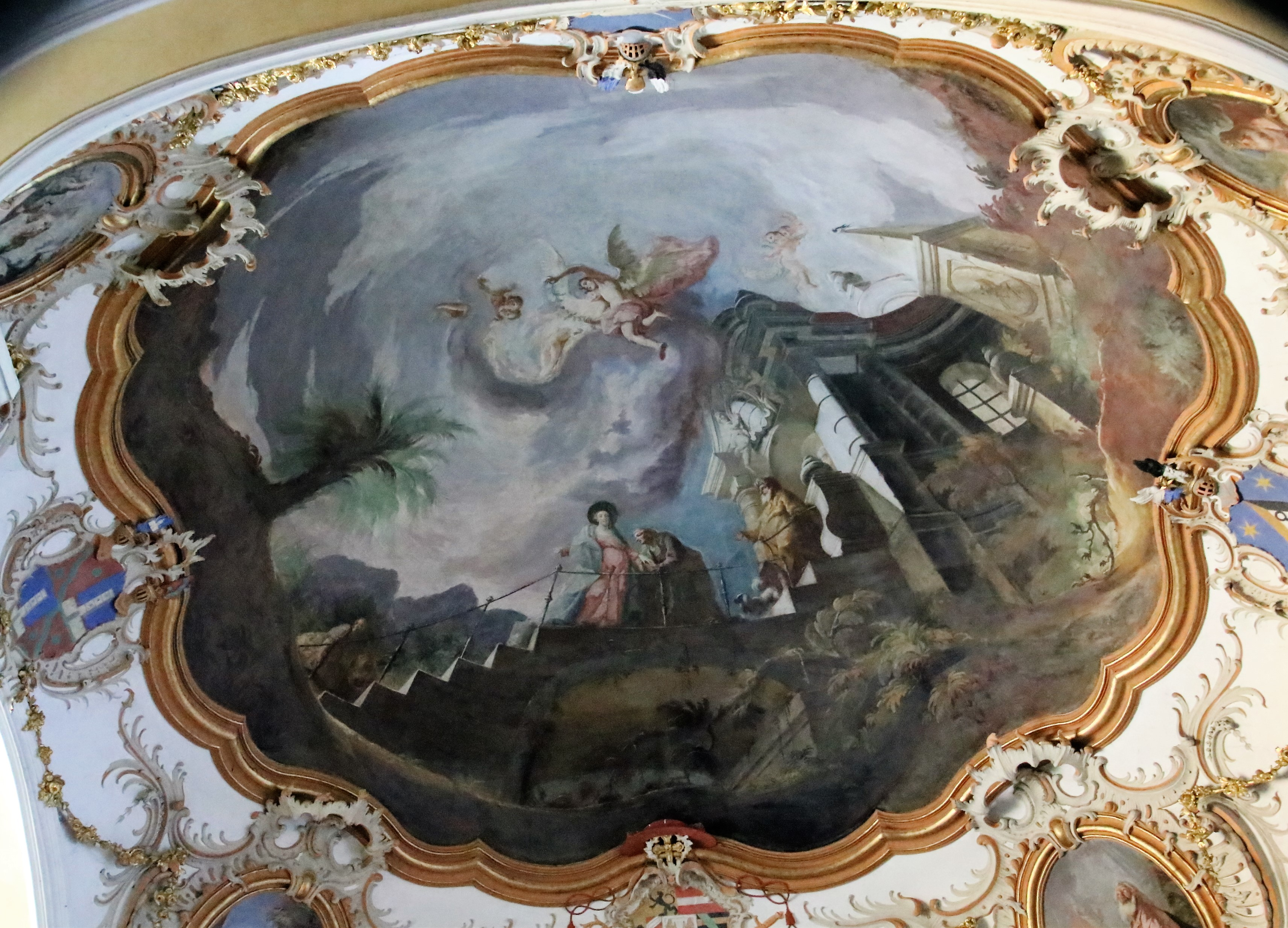

Johann Nepomuk della Croce was born at Pressano, in Tyrol, in 1736. He studied under Pietro Antonio Lorenzoni (who was not only a mentor but also his uncle), an Italian artist; after travelling in Italy, Germany, Hungary, and France, he settled at Burghausen.

Felix Joseph von Lipowsky estimated that della Croce painted 5000 portraits and 200 historical pictures. There are many altar-pieces painted by him in the churches of Bavaria. A portrait of the Mozart family is traditionally attributed to him. His son Clemente or Clemens Johann Evangelist della Croce (1782–1823) was also a painter; as was his grandson, Karl Klemens della Croce (1816–1891).

He died in 1819.
