= Petro (disambiguation) =

Petro is a masculine given name, a surname, and an Ancient Roman cognomen.

Petro may also refer to:

== People ==
- Chanel Petro-Nixon (1989–2006), an American teenager who was strangled to death in Brooklyn, New York, see Death of Chanel Petro-Nixon
- Dražen Petrović (1964–1993), Croatian basketball player in the National Basketball Association
- Alex Pietrangelo (born 1990), Canadian ice hockey player in the National Hockey League
- Gustavo Petro (born 1960), Political figure from Colombia, former president

== Brands and enterprises ==
- Petro Air, a charter airline based in Tripoli, Libya
- Petro Express, a former multi-store convenience chain based in Charlotte, North Carolina
- Petro-Canada, a Canadian energy company
- Petro, a chain of travel centers owned by TravelCenters of America

== Other uses ==
- Petro (cryptocurrency), a cryptocurrency developed by the government of Venezuela
- Petro loa, a family of spirits in Haitian Vodou religion, or a drum used in the music of Haiti
  - Dan Petro, a loa (family of spirits) in Vodou
  - Ti Jean Petro, a snake-loa in Haitian Vodou
- Petro Sport Stadium, a multi-use stadium in Cairo Governorate, Egypt

== See also ==
- Peter (disambiguation)
- Petr (disambiguation)
- Petra (disambiguation)
- Petre (disambiguation)
- Petri (disambiguation)
- Petros (disambiguation)
- Petru
- Petroleum
