= Medeleni =

Medeleni may refer to:

- Medeleni, a village in Vultureni Commune, Bacău County, Romania
- Medeleni, a village in Golăiești Commune, Iaşi County, Romania
- Medeleni, a village in Petreşti Commune, Ungheni district, Moldova
- La Medeleni, a book by Romanian novelist Ionel Teodoreanu
