= Petre =

Petre is a surname and given name derived from Peter. Notable persons with that name include:

== People with the given name Petre ==
- Charles Petre Eyre (1817–1902), English Roman Catholic prelate
- Ion Petre Stoican (circa 1930–1990), Romanian violinist
- Marian Petre Miluț (born 1955), Romanian politician, engineer and businessman
- Petre Andrei (1891–1940), Romanian sociologist
- Petre Antonescu (1873–1965), Romanian architect
- Petre S. Aurelian (1833–1909), Romanian politician
- Petre Cameniță (1889–1962), Romanian general during World War II
- Petre P. Carp (1837–1919), Romanian conservative politician and literary critic
- Petre Crowder (1919–1999), British Conservative politician and barrister
- Petre Dulfu (1856–1953), Romanian poet
- Petre Dumitrescu (1882–1950), Romanian general during World War II
- Petre Gruzinsky (1920–1984), Georgian poet
- Petre Ispirescu (1830–1887), Romanian printer and publicist
- Petre Mais (1885–1975), English writer and broadcaster
- Petre Marin (born 1973), Romanian footballer
- Petre Mavrogheni (1819–1887), Romanian politician
- Petre Mitu (born 1977), former Romanian rugby union footballer
- Petre Nicolae (21st century), Romanian actor
- Petre Popeangă (born 1944), Romanian politician
- Petre Roman (born 1946), Romanian politician
- Petre Stoica (1931–2009), Romanian poet
- Petre Tobă (born 1964), Romanian politician
- Petre Tsiskarishvili (born 1974), Georgian politician
- Petre Țuțea (1902–1991), Romanian philosopher

== People with the surname Petre ==
- Benjamin Petre (1672–1758), English Roman Catholic prelate
- Bernard Henry Philip Petre, 14th Baron Petre (1858–1908), husband of Etheldreda Mary Clark
- Ciprian Petre (born 1980), Romanian football player
- Cristian Petre (born 1979), Romanian rugby union player
- Dorotheea Petre (born 1981), Romanian actress
- Sir Edward Petre, 3rd Baronet (1631–1699), English Jesuit and privy councillor
- Esthera Petre (born 1990), Romanian high jumper
- Florentin Petre (born 1976), Romanian footballer
- Sir George Petre (1822–1905), British diplomat
- Francis Petre (1847–1918), prominent New Zealand-born architect
- Francis Loraine Petre (1852–1918), British military historian
- Henry Petre (1884–1962), Australia's first military aviator
- Henry William Petre (1820–1889), member of the New Zealand Legislative Council
- John Petre, 1st Baron Petre (1549–1613), Lord-Lieutenant of Essex
- John Petre, 18th Baron Petre (born 1942), Lord-Lieutenant of Essex
- Kay Petre (1903–1994), Canadian-British motor racing star
- Maria Petre (born 1951), Romanian politician and economist
- Marian Petre (born 1959), British computer scientist
- Maude Petre (1863–1942), British Roman Catholic nun, writer and critic
- Ovidiu Petre (born 1982), Romanian football player
- William Petre (1505–1572), public servant
- William Petre, 4th Baron Petre (1626–1684), victim of the Popish Plot

== See also ==
- Baron Petre
- Peter (disambiguation)
- Petr (disambiguation)
- Petra (disambiguation)
- Petre Bay
- Petri (disambiguation)
- Petro (disambiguation)
- Petru
- Turville-Petre
- Petreni (disambiguation)
- Petrești (disambiguation)
- Petreasa (disambiguation)
- Whanganui, a city in New Zealand originally called Petre
