= Petra (disambiguation) =

Petra is the Nabataean kingdom capital's archeological site, carved in the desert rock of (Trans)Jordan.

Petra, PETRA or Petria may also refer to :

== Places and jurisdictions ==
=== Mediterranean ===
Greece

- Petra (Corinthia), a town of ancient Corinthia
- Petra (Elis), a town of ancient Elis
- Petra, Boeotia, a village and community of the Aliartos municipality
- Petra, Lesbos, a village and former municipality on the island of Lesbos
- Petra, Pieria, a former municipality in Pieria regional unit
- Petra, Preveza, a village in Preveza regional unit

Other

- Petra (Illyria), a town of ancient Illyricum, now in Albania
- Petra (Lycaonia), a town of ancient Lycaonia, now in Turkey
- Petra in Aegypto, a Hellenistic city and former bishopric in Aegyptus Primus, now Hagar-En-Nauatiyeh (Egypt) and a Latin Catholic titular see
- Petra, Cyprus, a former intercommunal village in Northern Cyprus
- Petra, Majorca, a town in Balearic Spain
- Petralia Sottana known as Petra in Classical times.

=== Elsewhere ===
Black Sea

- Petra, Lazica, alias Petra in Lazica, a Roman fortress, settlement and former bishopric in Colchis, modern Georgia, now a Latin Catholic titular see
- Petra, a village in Bâcleș Commune, Mehedinţi County, Romania

Other

- Petra, Kentucky, an unincorporated community in the US

== People ==
- Petra (given name)

== Arts and entertainment ==
- Petra (band), a Christian rock band
  - Petra (album), their debut album
- Petra (film), a 2018 Spanish film
- Petra (sculpture), a 2010 sculpture by Marcel Walldorf
- Petra (TV series), a 2020 Italian TV crime series

== Business ==
- Petra (agency), Jordanian news agency
- Petra Airlines, former airline based in Amman, Jordan
- Petra Bank, bankrupt Jordanian bank
- Petra Diamonds, diamond mining company
- SS Petra, a West German merchant ship

== Science ==
- PETRA (Positron-Electron Tandem Ring Accelerator), a particle accelerator
- The proper name of the star WASP-80

== Other uses ==
- Petra (dog), a dog on the British children's TV programme Blue Peter
- Petra High School, an independent school in Bulawayo, Zimbabwe
- Petra Christian University, an Indonesian campus in Surabaya, East Java
- Petra (swan), an animal who become famous in 2006 for falling in love with a pedalo
- Petra, the official mascot of the 1992 Summer Paralympics.
- Petria (brachiopod), a brachiopod genus
- Petra, database system used by the UK Citizens Advice Bureau from 2011

== See also ==
- Petra tou Romiou, a sea stack in Pafos, Cyprus
- Pietra (disambiguation)
- Peter (name)
- Petroleum
- Petrus (disambiguation)
- Peta-
