= Petteri =

Petteri is a Finnish masculine given name, meaning Peter. People with this name include:

- Petteri Forsell (born 1990), Finnish footballer
- Petteri Iivonen (born 1987), Finnish violinist
- Petteri Kaijasilta (born 1974), Finnish footballer
- Petteri Kupiainen (born 1960), Finnish footballer
- Petteri Koponen (born 1988), Finnish professional basketball player
- Petteri Lampinen (born 1975), Finnish bandy player
- Petteri Lax (born 1985), Finnish long jumper
- Petteri Lehtinen (born 1973), Finnish medley swimmer
- Petteri Lehto (born 1961), Finnish ice hockey player
- Petteri Lotila (born 1978), Finnish-born Norwegian ice hockey player
- Petteri Nokelainen (born 1986), Finnish ice hockey player
- Petteri Nummelin (born 1972), Finnish ice hockey player
- Petteri Orpo (born 1969), Finnish politician
- Petteri Pennanen (born 1990), Finnish footballer
- Petteri Rasi Finnish ice hockey player
- Petteri Salomaa (born 1961), Finnish opera singer
- Petteri Silván (born 1972), Finnish enduro rider
- Petteri Similä (born 1990), Finnish ice hockey player
- Petteri Summanen (born 1969), Finnish actor and screenwriter
- Petteri Wirtanen (born 1986), Finnish ice hockey player

== See also ==
- Petteria
