= Petrești =

Petrești may refer to:

- Petrești, Dâmbovița, a commune in Dâmboviţa County, Romania
- Petrești, Satu Mare, a commune in Satu Mare County, Romania
- Petrești, a village in Coșești Commune, Argeș County, Romania
- Petrești, a village in Pâncești Commune, Bacău County, Romania
- Petrești, a village in Mintiu Gherlii Commune, Cluj County, Romania
- Petrești, a village in Corbii Mari Commune, Dâmboviţa County, Romania
- Petrești, a village in Bărbătești Commune, Gorj County, Romania
- Petrești, a village in Burjuc Commune, Hunedoara County, Romania
- Petrești, a village in Golăiești Commune, Iași County, Romania
- Petrești, a village in Corbeanca Commune, Ilfov County, Romania
- Petrești, a village in Vânatori Commune, Vrancea County, Romania
- Petrești, a district in the city of Sebeș, Alba County, Romania
- Petrești, Ungheni, a commune in Ungheni district, Moldova

== See also ==
- Petre (disambiguation)
- Petreni (disambiguation)
- Petreasa (disambiguation)
