= Comitanassus =

Ancient town in Lycaonia

Coordinates: 38°08′25″N 33°21′48″E

Comitanassus was a town of ancient Lycaonia, inhabited in Byzantine times. It appears in the Tabula Peutingeriana, under the name Comitanasso, and is located 20 M.P. from Perta.

Its site is located near Ortakuyu, Eskil, Aksaray Province, Turkey.
