= Agriculture in Georgia =

Agriculture in Georgia may refer to:

- Agriculture in Georgia (country)
- Agriculture in Georgia (U.S. state)
