= Ministry of Environmental Protection and Agriculture of Georgia =

Government ministry of Georgia

Environmental Protection and Agriculture of Georgia
- საქართველოს გარემოს დაცვისა და სოფლის მეურნეობის სამინისტრო
- Coat of arms of Georgia

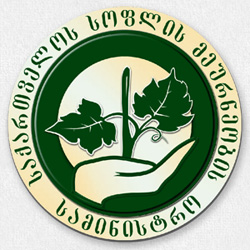

Agency overview
- Jurisdiction: Government of Georgia
- Headquarters: 6 Marshal Gelovani Str., Tbilisi, Georgia 0134
- Annual budget: ₾698.5 million (USD 263.1 million) (2023)
- Agency executive: Otar Shamugia (9 February 2022–Disputed), Minister of Environmental Protection and Agriculture of Georgia

The Ministry of Environmental Protection and Agriculture of Georgia (Georgian: საქართველოს გარემოს დაცვისა და სოფლის მეურნეობის სამინისტრო, sakartvelos garemos datsvisa da soplis meurneobis saministro) is a governmental agency within the Cabinet of Georgia in charge of regulation of economic activity in the agricultural sector of the country and environment protection with a purpose of increasing the sector's production capacity. The ministry is headed by Otar Shamugia.

== Structure ==
The ministry is headed by a minister, first deputy minister and two deputy ministers. It is subdivided into General Inspection, Management Unit for Food Safety and Risk Analysis, Department of Cooperation with International Organizations and Projects Management which overlook divisions on Rural Development, Region Rule, Legal Issues, etc. In December 2017, the Ministry of Environment and Natural Resources Protection was abolished and merged into that of Agriculture, which was renamed into the Ministry of Environmental Protection and Agriculture of Georgia.

== Budget ==
The budget of the Ministry of Environmental Protection and Agriculture in 2023 is GEL GEL 698.5 million (US$263.1 million), down by GEL 44.6 million (US$16.8 million) compared to the previous year.

== Ministers after 2004 ==
- David Shervashidze, February 2004 – December 2004
- Mikheil Svimonishvili, December 2004 – November 2006
- Petre Tsiskarishvili, November 2006 – May 2008
- Bakur Kvezereli, April 2008 – October 2011
- Zaza Gorozia, October 2011 – October 2012
- David Kirvalidze, October 2012 – April 2013
- Shalva Pipia, April 2013 –
- Otar Danelia, December 30, 2015 – September 9, 2016
- Levan Davitashvili, September 9, 2016 – February 9, 2022
- Otar Shamugia, February 9, 2022 –

== See also ==
- Cabinet of Georgia
- Agriculture in Georgia
