= Fernando Coronil =

Venezuelan historian (1944–2011)

Fernando Coronil (November 30, 1944 Caracas – August 16, 2011, New York City) was a Venezuelan anthropologist and historian best known for his study of the politics of oil in Venezuela.

== Biography ==
Fernando Coronil was born in Caracas, Venezuela, on November 30, 1944, to public health professionals Lya Imber de Coronil (1914–1981) and Fernando Rubén Coronil (1911-2004). His mother was of Russian Jewish descent, and was the first woman to graduate from medical school in Venezuela. During her medical career, she served as the director of Caracas's Hospital de Niños. Coronil’s father, a Venezuelan man of Andalusian descent, occupied an influential position as an experimental surgeon at the Hospital Vargas de Caracas.

From 1958 to 1962, Coronil attended the public high school Liceo Andrés Bello. During this time, Coronil was elected president of the Liceo Andrés Bello student association. In this position, Coronil took an active role in politics, which at one point led him to distribute material criticizing the policies of then-president Rómulo Betancourt. This political activity attracted the attention of local law enforcement. The local authorities’ interest in Coronil’s political activity contributed to his parents’ later decision that his university education should take place abroad.

In 1963, Following his early engagement with Venezuelan politics, Coronil traveled to the United States, where he attended Stanford University as an undergraduate student. He initially pursued a pre-medical course of study, but eventually decided to adopt a liberal arts education instead. At Stanford, Coronil met his future wife and frequent coauthor Julie Skurski.

Coronil graduated Phi Beta Kappa from Stanford in early 1967, with a Bachelor of Arts in history and social thought. After graduating from Stanford, Coronil spent a year at Cornell University before leaving in 1968 to pursue a Ph.D. in anthropology at the University of Chicago. At the University of Chicago, he studied alongside Julie Skurski, Victor Turner, Terrence Turner, Bernard Cohn, and John Coatsworth.

As a part of their Ph.D. fieldwork, Skurski and Coronil had originally planned to conduct research in Cuba. However, Coronil was unable to secure permission from the Cuban government to conduct research in the country. Upon his return to the United States, Coronil was detained by the Immigration and Naturalization Service and subsequently expelled from the country "as a subversive agent, although no specific charges were ever disclosed". As a result, Coronil returned to Venezuela, where he taught at the Universidad Católica Andrés Bello and focused on writing a dissertation on Venezuela. The Immigration and Naturalization Service later lifted the unstated charges against Coronil, at which point he returned to the United States. He ultimately earned a Ph.D. in anthropology from the University of Chicago in 1987.

In 1988, Coronil became a member of the Society of Fellows at the University of Michigan, after which the university hired him into a position as a professor of anthropology and history in the College of Literature, Science, and the Arts. At the University of Michigan, Coronil was a member of the Department of Anthropology, the Program in the Comparative Study of Social Transformations, the Director of the Interdisciplinary Doctoral Program in Anthropology and History, and the Latin American and Caribbean Studies Program.

Coronil left the University of Michigan on December 31, 2008 to take a position as a Professor of Anthropology at the Graduate Center of the City University of New York (CUNY).

On August 16, 2011, Fernando Coronil died of lung cancer at Sloan Kettering Memorial Hospital in New York City. He was 66 years old.

== Influences ==
Coronil’s academic work is influenced by leftist postcolonial and anti-imperial literature, poetics, state theory, and Marxist geography. His work draws heavily on Antonio Gramsci’s concept of the subaltern, and contributes to the related field of subaltern studies. In addition, Coronil’s concepts of occidentalism and globalcentrism draw significant inspiration from Edward Said’s Orientalism.

== Major works ==
Coronil's doctoral dissertation, completed in 1987, was entitled The Black El Dorado: Money Fetishism, Democracy, and Capitalism in Venezuela. Like Coronil's later work, the dissertation dealt with the Venezuelan oil economy and its relationship with both state and global politics.

In 1997, Coronil published his best known work, The Magical State, in which he explores the relationship between the Venezuelan state and the country's petroleum-reliant economy. The Magical State also discusses how the Venezuelan state is transformed not only by oil, but by the relationship between the state, society, and nature. Coronil's work in The Magical State has influenced academics such as Andrew Apter and Suzana Sawyer, whose own work also mapped the role of oil wealth in influencing cultural practices among nation states.

In 2000, Coronil published an essay entitled Beyond Occidentalism, which refers to the writing of post-colonial Marxist scholar and psychiatrist Frantz Fanon to introduce a geohistorical critique of Western self-conception, as part of a larger deconstruction of the poetics behind imperial geographic ideas. In the same year, Coronil also published Towards a Critique of Globalcentrism, an article that draws on concepts introduced in Beyond Occidentalism to critique the role of discourse surrounding globalization in perpetuating certain imperial modes of thought. Together, these articles contribute to an argument “for the recognition of the neoliberal global order as an imperial formation,” and contribute to Coronil’s view of capitalist globalization discourse as a mode of West-privileging occidentalist thought.

Coronil also co-edited with Julie Skurski a volume entitled States of Violence in 2006.

At the time of his death, Coronil was working on a book entitled Crude Matters, regarding the former Venezuelan president Hugo Chávez and the attempted 2002 coup against his administration.
