= Petr =

Petr is a Czech form of the masculine given name Peter and a surname. For information on Petr as a first name, see Peter (given name).

== Given name ==
- Petr Aven (born 1955), Russian billionaire banker, economist, and politician
- Petr Čech (born 1982), former Czech footballer and current ice hockey goaltender
- Petr Čech (hurdler) (1944–2022), Czech hurdler
- Petr Chelčický (c. 1390 – c. 1460), Czech Christian spiritual leader and author in Bohemia
- Petr Cornelie (born 1996), French-Czech basketball player
- Petr Druzhinin (born 1974), Russian-Israeli historian and author
- Petr Duchoň (born 1956), Czech politician
- Petr Fiala (born 1964), Czech politician and Prime Minister of the Czech Republic
- Petr Fiala (senator) (born 1968), Czech senator
- Petr Ginz (1928–1944), Czechoslovak half-Jewish writer, diarist, and publisher, victim of the Holocaust
- Petr Gumennik (born 2002), Russian figure skater
- Petr Kellner (1964–2021), Czech billionaire businessman
- Petr Korda (born 1968), Czech tennis player
- Petr Mitrichev (born 1985), Russian competitive programmer under the handle "Petr"
- Petr Mrázek (born 1992), Czech ice hockey goaltender
- Petr Nedvěd (born 1971), Czech ice hockey player
- Petr Neuman (1978–2025), Czech chess grandmaster
- Petr Pavel (born 1961), president of the Czech Republic, former army general
- Petr Gumennik (born 2002), Russian figure skater
- Pětr Šołtka (1945–2022), German-Sorb politician
- Petr Yan (born 1993), Russian mixed martial artist and current UFC Bantamweight Champion

== Surname ==
- Jacqueline Petr (born 1970), Canadian ice dancer
- Jakub Petr (born 1990), Czech footballer
- Jiří Petr (1931–2014), Czech agroscientist and Rector Emeritus of the CULS Prague
- Karel Petr (1868–1950), Czech mathematician
- Oskar Petr (1952–2026), Czech musician
- Radek Petr (born 1987), Czech footballer

== See also ==
- Petru
- Pieter
- Petro (disambiguation)
- Petre
