= Peter =

Peter may refer to:

== People ==
- List of people with given name Peter, a list of people and fictional characters with the given name
- Peter (given name)
  - Saint Peter (died 60s), apostle of Jesus, leader of the early Christian Church
- Peter (surname), a surname (including a list of people with the name)

== Culture ==
- Peter (actor) (born 1952), stage name of Shinnosuke Ikehata, a Japanese dancer and actor
- Peter (1934 film), a film directed by Henry Koster
- Peter (2021 film), a Marathi language film
- Peter (2026 film), an Indian crime drama film
- "Peter" (Fringe episode), an episode of the television series Fringe
- Peter (novel), a 1908 book by Francis Hopkinson Smith
- "Peter" (short story), an 1892 short story by Willa Cather
- Peter (album), a 1972 album by Peter Yarrow
- Peter, a 1993 EP by Canadian band Eric's Trip
- "Peter", 2024 song by Taylor Swift from The Tortured Poets Department: The Anthology

== Animals ==
- Peter (Lord's cat), cat at Lord's Cricket Ground in London
- Peter (chief mouser), Chief Mouser between 1929 and 1946
- Peter II (cat), Chief Mouser between 1946 and 1947
- Peter III (cat), Chief Mouser between 1947 and 1964
- Peter (dog), a collie awarded the Dickin Medal in 1945
- Peter (eagle), a bald eagle at the Philadelphia Mint c. 1830–36
- Peter (fish), a genus of fishes in the family Gobiidae

== Other uses ==
- The Peter, or Peter Pomegranate, a 16th-century English warship
- Peter, Utah or Petersboro, a census-designated place (CDP) in Cache County, Utah, United States
- Act of Peter, a 5th-century miracle text
- Acts of Peter, one of the apocryphal Acts of the Apostles
- Gospel of Peter, a non-canonical gospel
- List of storms named Peter, various tropical cyclones

== See also ==
- , including many people with forename Peter
- Epistle of Peter (disambiguation)
- King Peter (disambiguation)
- Pete (disambiguation)
- Peters (disambiguation)
- Petrus (disambiguation)
- Petre, a surname and given name
- Petro (disambiguation)
- Petru, a Romanian name meaning Peter, including a list of people with the name
- Petteri, a Finnish name meaning Peter, including a list of people with the name
- Pierre (disambiguation)
- Pietro, an Italian name meaning Peter, including a list of people with the name
- Piter (disambiguation)
- Saint Peter (disambiguation)
