= Biblical genre =

A Biblical genre is a classification of Bible literature according to literary genre. The genre of a particular Bible passage is ordinarily identified by analysis of its general writing style, tone, form, structure, literary technique, content, design, and related linguistic factors; texts that exhibit a common set of literary features (very often in keeping with the writing styles of the times in which they were written) are together considered to be belonging to a genre. In Biblical studies, genres are usually associated with whole books of the Bible, because each of its books comprises a complete textual unit; however, a book may be internally composed of a variety of styles, forms, and so forth, and thus bear the characteristics of more than one genre (for example, chapter 1 of the Book of Revelation is prophetic/visionary; chapters 2 and 3 are similar to the epistle genre; etc.).

== Academic debate ==
Within the discipline of literary analysis, the existence and subjectivity of genres are a matter of some debate. This is reflected in academic discussion of Biblical genres. However, isolating the broad genres of the Bible and discerning which books/passages belong to which genre is not a matter of complete agreement; for instance, scholars diverge over the existence and features of such Bible genres as gospel and apocalyptic. Furthermore, some detect subgenres—more narrowly defined compositional categories within a genre—in surrounding historical literature, and speculate that certain books and passages of the Bible may be better denominated by subgenre (e.g., it may be claimed that the book of Philemon is not simply a generic letter, but a personal letter). Despite such differences of opinion within the community of Bible scholars, the majority acknowledges that the concept of genre and subgenre can be useful in the study of the Bible as a guide to the tone and interpretation of the text.

== Genres in the Bible ==
Some of the more generally recognized genres and categorizations of the Bible (note that other systems and classifications have also been advanced) include:

- Historical narrative/epic:Joshua, Judges, Ruth, 1 and 2 Samuel, 1 and 2 Kings, 1 and 2 Chronicles, Ezra, Nehemiah, Esther, Genesis and the first half of Exodus, Numbers, Jonah, and possibly Acts
- The Law: the last half of Exodus; also Leviticus, Deuteronomy
- Wisdom literature: Job, Proverbs, Ecclesiastes
- Psalms: Psalms, Song of Solomon, Lamentations
- Prophecy: Isaiah, Jeremiah, Ezekiel, Daniel, Hosea, Joel, Amos, Obadiah, Jonah, Micah, Nahum, Habakkuk, Zephaniah, Haggai, Zechariah, Malachi
- Apocalyptic literature: Daniel, Revelation
- Gospel: Matthew, Mark, Luke, John
- Acts of the Apostles (genre): Book of Acts
- Epistle (letter): Romans, 1 and 2 Corinthians, Galatians, Ephesians, Philippians, Colossians, 1 and 2 Thessalonians, 1 and 2 Timothy, Titus, Philemon, Hebrews, James, 1 and 2 Peter, 1, 2, and 3 John, Jude

Note also:

- Fables such as the tale of Jotham (Judges 9:7-15)
- Parables (2 Samuel 12:1-4, 14:4-9; 1 Kings 20:39 and following; synoptic Gospels)
- Riddles (Judges 14:14 and following; Proverbs 30:11 and following)
- Maxims (1 Samuel 15:22, 24:14, and the greater part of Proverbs)
- Monologues and dialogues in Job 3:3 and following

== See also ==
- Biblical criticism
- Comparative literature
- Literature
- Genre
- Biblical hermeneutics
- Biblical poetry
- Historical-grammatical method
- Higher criticism
