= Apter =

Apter (אַפּטער, Аптер) is a Jewish surname meaning "someone from Apta (Opatów)". Notable people with the surname include:

- Andrew Apter (born 1956), American historian and anthropologist
- Bill Apter (born 1945), journalist
- David Apter (1924–2010), American political scientist
- Nikolai Apter, former pair skater
- Yakov Natanovich Apter, Soviet graphic artist

== See also ==
- Apta (Hasidic dynasty), a Hasidic dynasty
