= Gorozia =

Gorozia (Georgian: გოროზია; Russian: Горозия) is a surname. Notable people with the surname include:

- Giorgi Gorozia (born 1995), Georgian footballer
- L'One (born 1985), or Levan Gorozia, Georgian-Russian musician
- Zaza Gorozia (born 1975), Georgian politician
