= Chelčice =

- Municipality
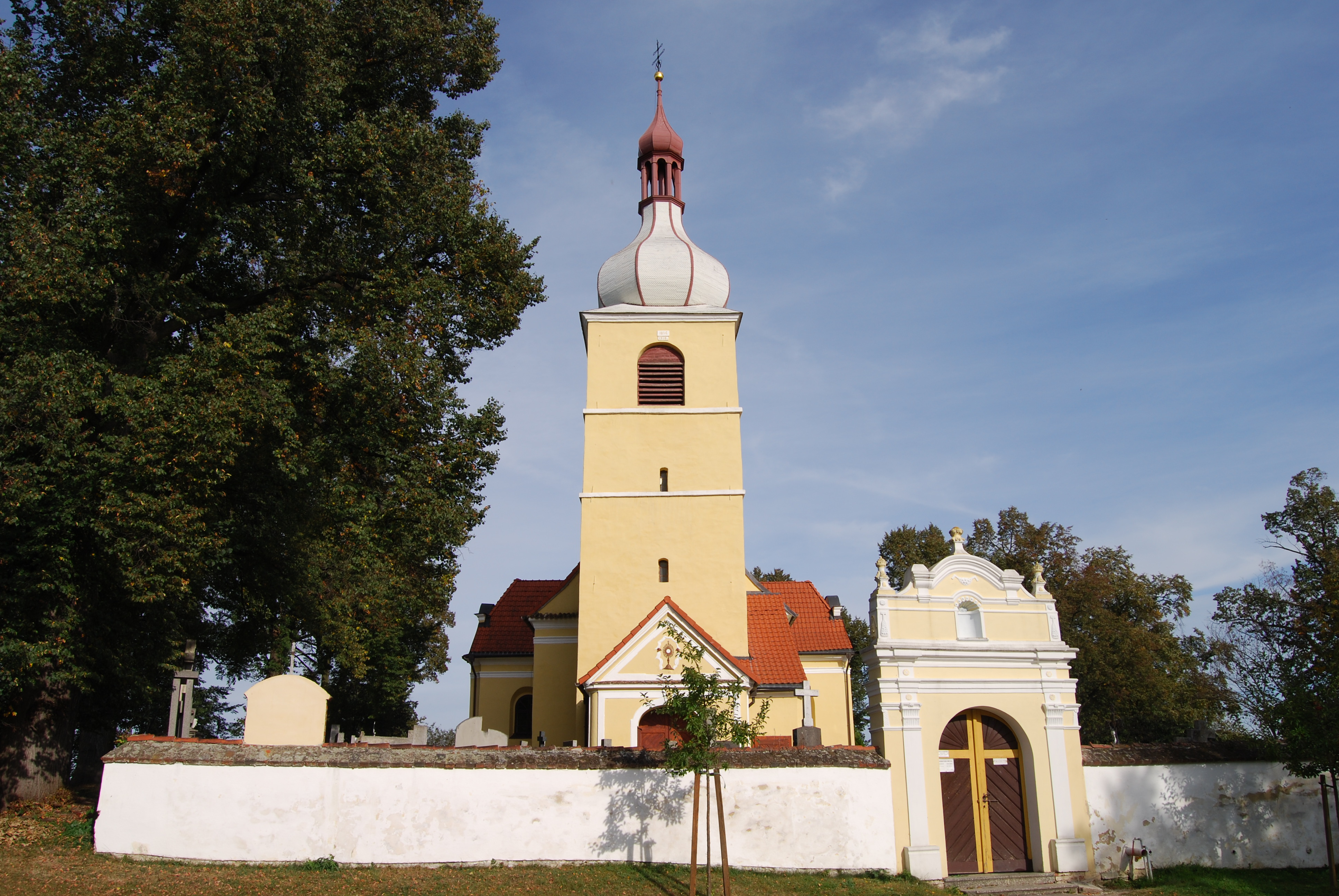
- Church of Saint Martin

- Flag Coat of arms

- Location in the Czech Republic
- Coordinates: 49°7′19″N 14°10′9″E
- Country: Czech Republic
- Region: South Bohemian
- District: Strakonice
- First mentioned: 1352

Area
  - Total: 4.82 km^{2} (1.86 sq mi)
- Elevation: 457 m (1,499 ft)

Population (2026-01-01)
  - Total: 409
  - Density: 84.9/km^{2} (220/sq mi)
- Time zone: UTC+1 (CET)
  - Summer (DST): UTC+2 (CEST)
- Postal code: 389 01
- Website: www.chelcice.cz

Chelčice is a municipality and village in Strakonice District in the South Bohemian Region of the Czech Republic. It has about 400 inhabitants.

== Etymology ==
The initial name of the village was Chylčice. It was derived from the personal name Chýlek, meaning "the village of Chýlek's people".

== Geography ==
Chelčice is located about 24 kilometres (15 mi) southeast of Strakonice and 26 km (16 mi) northwest of České Budějovice. It lies in the Bohemian Forest Foothills. The highest point is the hill Holička at 620 metres (2,030 ft) above sea level.

== History ==
The first written mention of Chelčice is from 1352.

== Demographics ==
Historical population

Year	Pop.	±%
1869	386	—
1880	375	−2.8%
1890	381	+1.6%
1900	420	+10.2%
1910	420	+0.0%

Year	Pop.	±%
1921	410	−2.4%
1930	415	+1.2%
1950	328	−21.0%
1961	315	−4.0%
1970	286	−9.2%

Year	Pop.	±%
1980	306	+7.0%
1991	374	+22.2%
2001	352	−5.9%
2011	419	+19.0%
2021	409	−2.4%

Source: Censuses

== Economy ==
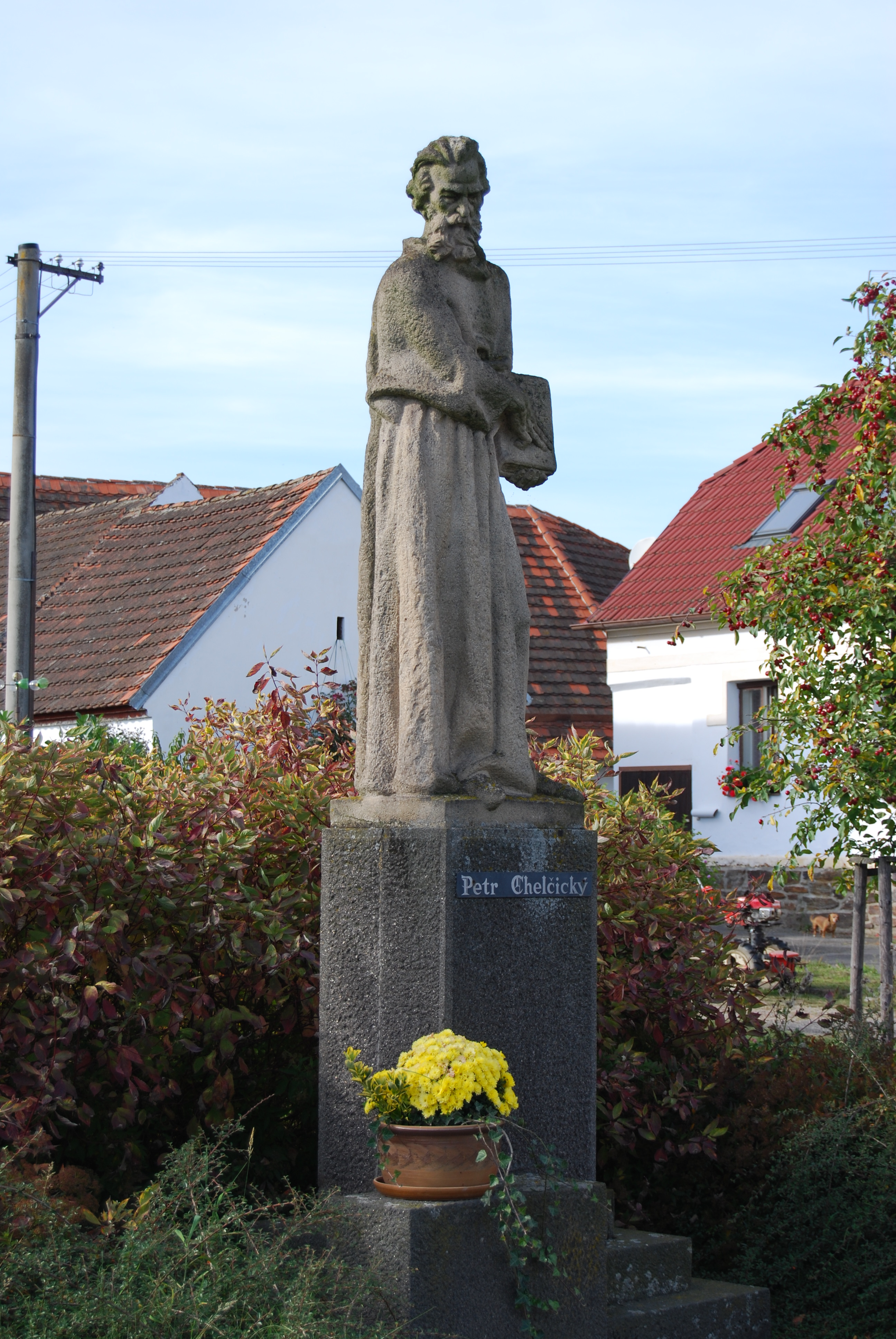
Monument of Petr Chelčický

Chelčice has a long tradition of fruit growing. The newest varieties of apple, cherry, sour cherry and currant are grown here.

== Transport ==
There are no railways or major roads passing through the municipality.

== Sights ==
The main landmark of Chelčice is the Church of Saint Martin. The original Romanesque church from the first half of the 13th century was rebuilt in the Baroque style in the 17th century. The interior is decorated with valuable frescoes from 1759.

== Notable people ==
- Petr Chelčický (c. 1390 – c. 1460), Christian spiritual leader
