= Ti Jean =

Haitian Vodou lwa

- Head of the Zandor (Petwo rite)
- Member of Nago nation (Rada rite)
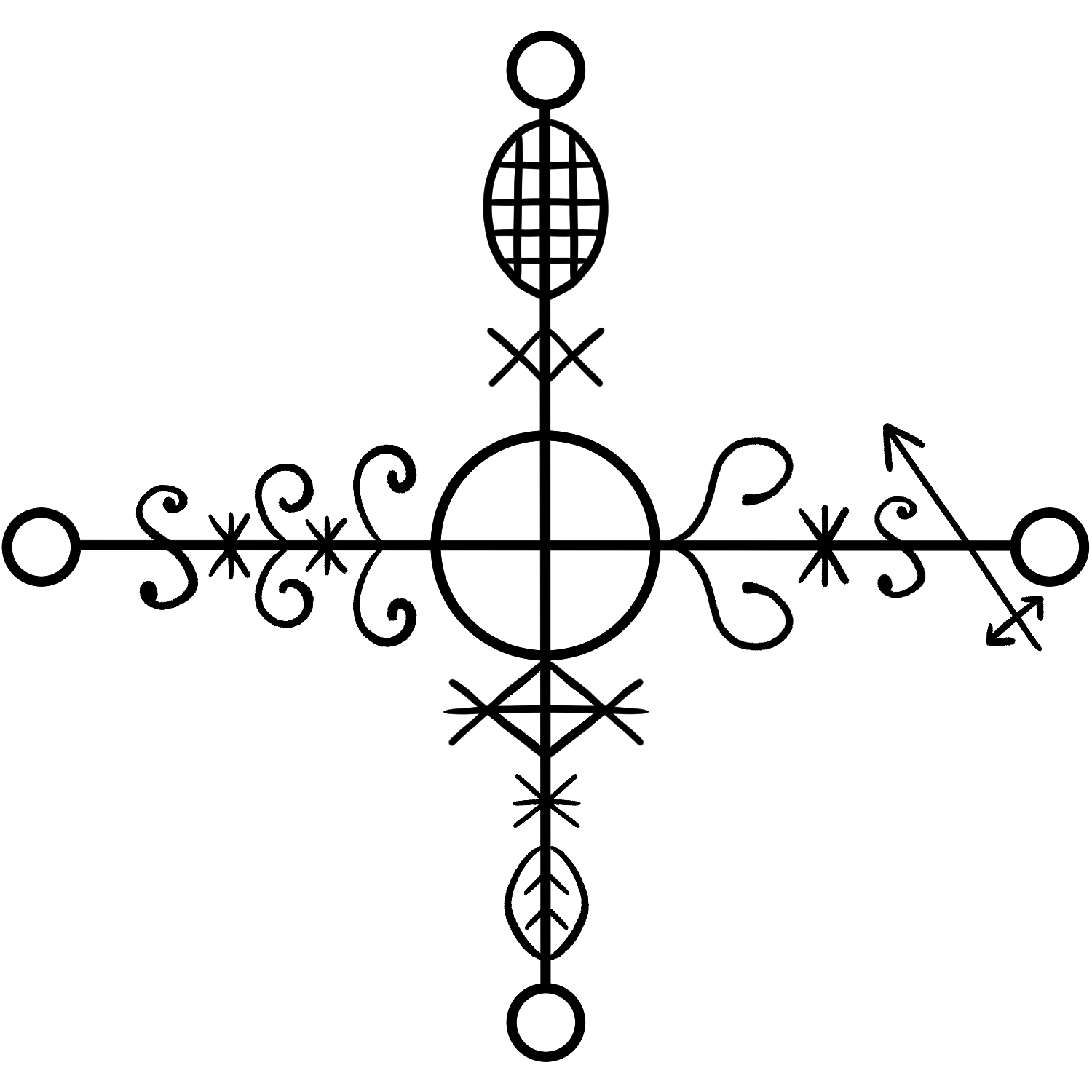
- Veve of Ti Jean Dantor
- Other names: Dantor: Ti Jean Dantor, Frère Ti Jean; Petwo: Ti Jean Petwo, Ti Jean Pied-Sec, Ti-Jean Pied-Fin; Zandor: Ti Jean Zandor, Prince Zandor; Other: Ti Jean Quinto
- Venerated in: Haitian vodou
- Predecessor: Dan Petro (Note: per Andrew Apter)
- Abode: Borgne (Ti Jean Quinto)
- Attributes: Short, one-legged
- Color: Red
- Gender: Male
- Parents: Dan Petro (Petwo); Ezili Dantor (Dantor)
- Consort: Marinette-bwa-chèch

Equivalents
- Christian: John the Baptist (Ti Jean Dantor)
- Dominican Vudú: Tinyó

Ti Jean (Note: also rendered 'Ti Jean, Ti-Jean) (Haitian Creole for 'Little John') is a lwa in Haitian Vodou with many aspects. As the head of the Zandor family of lwa, he is called Ti Jean Zandor or Prince Zandor. In the Dantor family, he is known as Ti Jean Dantor or Frère Ti Jean ('Brother Little John'). He has been merged into the Petwo rite as Ti Jean Petwo, Ti Jean Pied-Sec or Ti-Jean Pied-Fin ('Little John dried-feet'). He is also identified as a Nago in the Rada rite.

== Mythology ==
=== Zandor and Petwo ===
Ti Jean Zandor is the head of the Zandor lwa family, a family that has been brought into the fold of the Petwo rite. In Petwo, he is the son of Dan Petro, and married to Marinette-bwa-chèch. He is named by the ephithets Ti Jean Petwo, Ti Jean Pied-Sec or Ti-Jean Pied-Fin.

Ti Jean Petwo is described as a short, one-legged man who stalks roads from the tops of palm trees, dropping on unsuspecting passerby and cannibalizing them; Alfred Métraux described Ti Jean Zandor's possession of a woman to drive her to bite herself and shake violently. He is invoked in the Petwo rite as a "bought" lwa, a malevolent spirit invoked to take advantage of its great power. Kieran M. Murphy suggests that the physical description of the lwa mirrors Haitian maroon rebel leader Colas Jambes Coupées (Colas Severed-Legs), executed 1723 by Saint-Domingue authorities on charges including 'witchcraft'; Murphy posits that Ti Jean's missing leg is a reference to contemporary slave punishment, and the lwa's predatory nature evoked Saint-Domingue Creoles' fear of maroons.

Anthropologist Luc de Heusch identified Ti Jean Petro as being syncretized with Anthony the Great, though noting that Simbi is as well.

==== Dantor ====
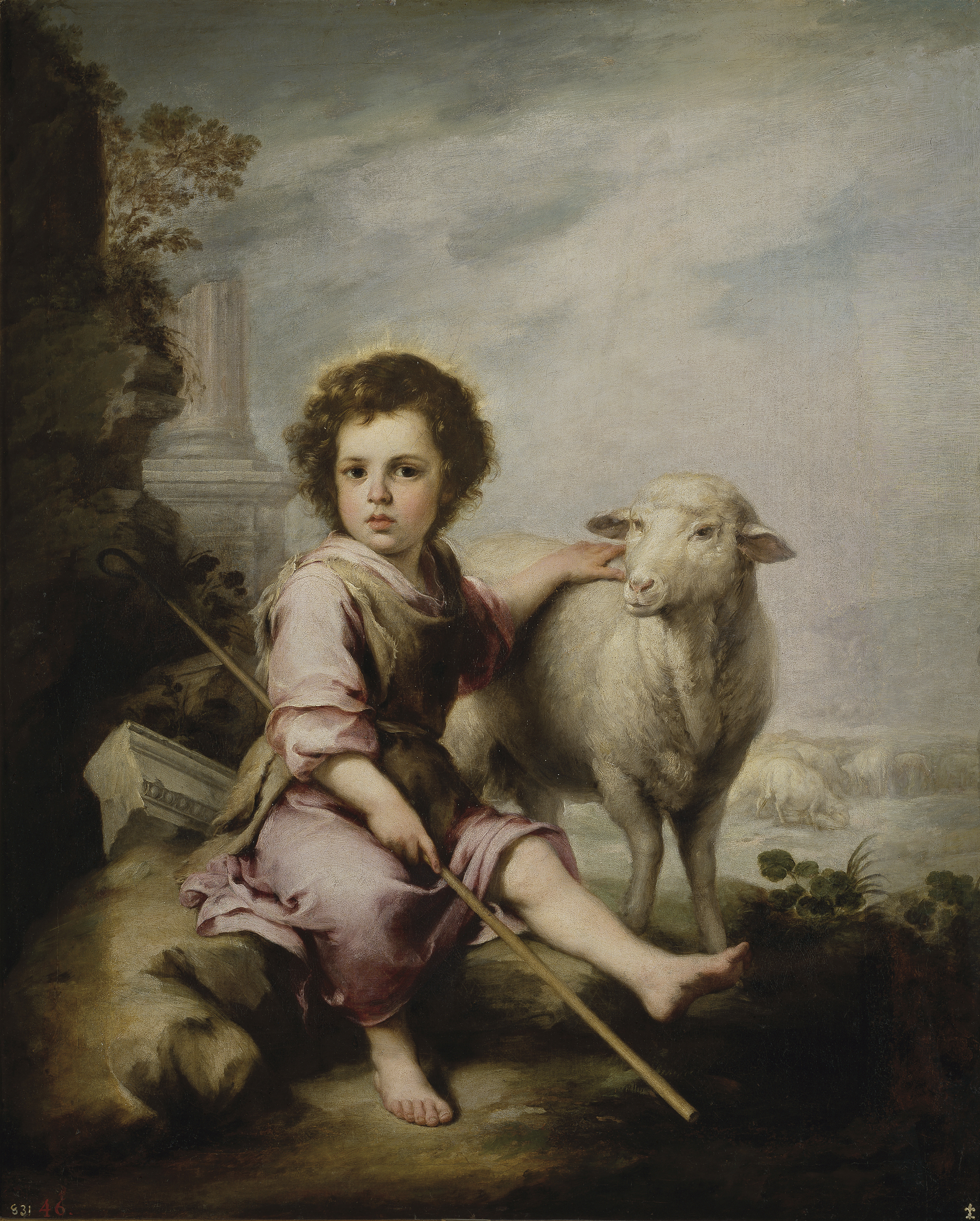
Ti Jean Dantor is syncretized with the young John the Baptist.

In the Dantor family of Petwo, Ti Jean Dantor is the son of Erzulie Dantor, or an aspect of her. He is the lieutenant to Ogoun Balendjo. Ti Jean Dantor is a trickster.

He is syncretized with John the Baptist; he is further identified as Frère Ti Jean ('Brother Little John'), or an aspect of Ogoun in "Agoum-Tonnere" ('Ogoun Thunder).

=== Other aspects ===
In the Rada rite, Ti Jean is identified as part of the Nago nation.

Another aspect of Ti Jean is Ti Jean Quinto, prevalent in the Department of Nord. He is described as a rude lwa dressed as a policeman, who lives under a bridge in Borgne.

Ti Jean is known as Tinyó in Dominican Vudú; Tinyó is syncretized with Archangel Rafael.

== Provenance and historiography ==
Luc de Heusch in 1989 wrote that Ti Jean, along with his wife Marienette, originated as nkita spirits from Kongo religion; further, he drew comparison between Ti Jean's short stature and lameness to the religious significance of Pygmy peoples and those with clubfoot in Kongo religion.

Historian Andrew Apter in 2002 wrote that Ti Jean was the apotheosis of the legendary bokor Dan Petro, founder of the Petwo rite.
