= National Wine Agency of Georgia =

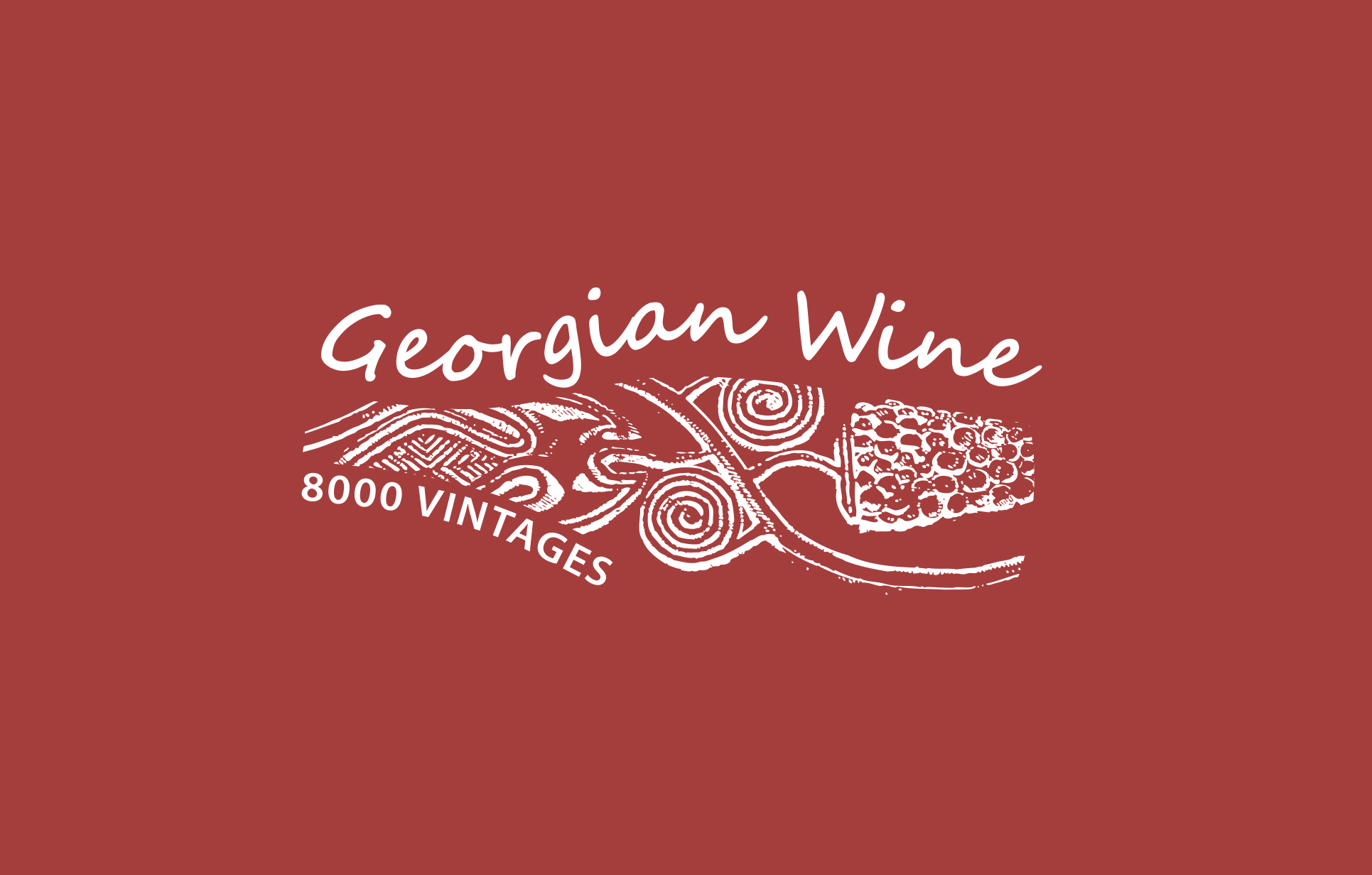
The National Wine Agency of Georgia

The National Wine Agency of Georgia (Georgian: ღვინის ეროვნული სააგენტო) is a legal entity of public law under the Ministry of Agriculture of Georgia that was founded in 2014 in accordance with the law on “Vine and Wine". The Agency operates in constant contact with the Ministry of Agriculture and relevant state and private companies in the field of wine making.

== Main directions of activity ==
1. Popularizing and raising awareness of Georgian wine;
2. Promotion of the growth of export potential;
3. Popularization of Georgian vine origination;
4. Restoration of the unique and rare Georgian grape varieties;
5. Creation of a vineyard register;
6. Popularization of the oldest Georgian traditional methods of kvevri wine making;
7. Supporting the development of wine tourism.

== Responsibilities and Functions of the Agency ==
1. Regulation of viticulture - wine making industry;
2. Protection of consumer market counterfeiting products;
3. Monitoring the production and planting of vine mother plantations, grafting materials and grafted seedlings;
4. Technical and phytosanitary control;
5. Preparation of proposals and recommendations for functionality and development of the branch;
6. State control of the appellations of origin of winesand wine brands;
7. Issuing of certificates of compliance and origin of alcoholic beverages of grape-origin;
8. Labeling control of grape-origin alcoholic beverages;
9. Interrelations with national and international organizations in the viticulture-wine making field, plus marketing and promotional activities;
10. Promotion of the arrangement of alcoholic beverage tasting events, competitions, exhibitions and seminars;
11. Support of Permanently Acting Degustation Committee at the Agency;
12. Investigation of administrative infringements within the authority granted by law.
