= Petru =

Petru is a given name, and may refer to:

- Petru I of Moldavia (Petru Mușat, 1375–1391), ruler of Moldavia
- Petru Aron (died 1467), ruler of Moldavia
- Petru Bălan (born 1976), Romanian rugby union footballer
- Petru Cărare (1935–2019), writer from Moldova
- Petru Cercel (died 1590), voivode of Wallachia, polyglot
- Petru Dugulescu (1945–2008), Romanian Baptist pastor, poet, and politician
- Petru Filip (born 1955), current mayor of the municipality of Oradea
- Petru Fudduni (c. 1600–1670), poet
- Petru Giovacchini (1910–1955), Corsican hero
- Petru Groza (1884–1958), Romanian politician and Prime Minister
- Petru Lucinschi (born 1940), Moldova's second president
- Petru Luhan (born 1977), Romanian politician
- Petru Maior (c. 1756–1821), Romanian writer
- Petru Mocanu (1931–2016), Romanian mathematician
- Petru Pavel Aron (1709–1764), Romanian Greek-Catholic cleric and intellectual
- Petru Poni (1841–1925), Romanian chemist
- Petru Rareș (c. 1487–1546), ruler of Moldavia
- Petru Stoianov (born 1931), Romanian composer
- Petru Țurcaș (born 1976), Romanian footballer
- Ryszard Petru (born 1972), Polish politician

== See also ==
- Peter (disambiguation)
- Petr (disambiguation)
- Petra (disambiguation)
- Petre
- Petri
- Petro (disambiguation)
