= Turville-Petre =

Turville-Petre is a surname. Notable people with the surname include:

- Francis Turville-Petre, an English archaeologist, famous for discovering the 'Galilee Skull', and a friend of Christopher Isherwood and W. H. Auden
- E. O. G. Turville-Petre (commonly known as Gabriel Turville-Petre), an English Professor of Ancient Icelandic Literature and Antiquities at Oxford University
- Joan Turville-Petre, a lecturer in English, Anglo-Saxon and Ancient Icelandic at Oxford University
- Thorlac Turville-Petre, an English philologist who became head of the School of English at the University of Nottingham

== See also ==
- Petre
