= La Medeleni =

Trio of novels by Ionel Teodoreanu

- Cover of the 1984 edition (as La Medeleni), published by Cartea Românescă
- Author: Ionel Teodoreanu
- Original title: La Medeleni
- Illustrator: grimbo
- Language: Romanian
- Genre: Romance
- Publisher: Cartea Românească
- Publication place: Romania
- Media type: print

La Medeleni (English: At Medeleni) is a trio of novels written by Ionel Teodoreanu. The books were set in the village of Medeleni, in Iași County, Romania. The trilogy includes: The Fickle Border (Romanian: Hotarul Nestatornic) published in 1925, Roads (Romanian: Drumuri) published in 1926, and Between the Winds (Romanian: Între Vânturi) published in 1927. Teodoreanu’s inspiration for the novels came from a mansion on the bank of the river Prut where friends from the literary world would gather. On May 21 2016, the mansion became a museum in memoriam of Ionel Teodoreanu.

== Synopsis ==
At Medeleni is a novel about an idealised childhood and adolescence, designed in an Edenic patriarchal setting. The plot is centred around two siblings, Daniel and Olguța (Romanian: [Olgu[t͡s]a]) Deleanu, and their step sister, Monica. According to her father, Olguța is an "angelic devil, a mixture of purity and inclinations towards little malice." (Note: The Jurnalul National newspaper republishes old books on a regular basis) She is constantly shaking, does not accept contradiction, and tries to subordinate everything that surrounds her.

Daniel tends to be calm but can often lose his patience and becomes nervous because of his sister, Olguța. He often dreams about saving Monica but is awakened by his sister from time to time.

Monica ensures the balance between the siblings, who are in a continuous argument. She is gentle, generous and always jumps in to help others. Monica is in love with Daniel throughout the novel. Daniel realizes at the end that he is in love with Monica as well. They get married and enjoy a happy life.

Olguța falls in love with Vania, an older man. She plans to marry him and go to America, but she discovers that she has cancer. In the end, she commits suicide. After the death of Olguța, the Deleanu family sells the estate.

== Reception ==
Miron Radu Paraschivescu claimed that Olguța is one of the most successful characters in Teodoreanu's literary works. (Note: apud op. cit.)

In 1995, a group of experts from Aix-Marseille University reviewed the trilogy and highlighted that Teodoreanu was traditionally considered by Romanians as the novelist of childhood. They remarked that At Medeleni is a good illustration of life in Romania in the 1920s. At Medeleni attains the ineffability of sensation and opens with a writing style torn between suffering and voluptuousness, a vertiginous perspective evoking baroque aesthetics.

According to the Romanian newspaper Jurnalul Național, "At Medeleni is the book that sealed the literary reputation of the novelist, who, at the age of 30, was already nationally renowned. After his At Medeleni series, his books became popular items on bookstore shelves[...]".

Critics and theorists, like George Călinescu, mentioned that the novel "has a lasting value," Camil Petrescu said that the work presents "affective aspects" of children through a series of life incidents, and, in turn, Garabet Ibrăileanu established that the main character, Olguța, is "the most striking type[...] and the most successful girl model in our literature."
