= Chýlek =

Chýlek (feminine: Chýlková) is a Czech surname. It originated either as a diminutive of the surname Chýle or Chýla, or it was derived directly from the Old Czech adjective chýlý (i.e. 'crooked', 'inclined'), and the surname thus originated as a nickname based on physical appearance. Notable people with the surname include:

- Ivana Chýlková (born 1963), Czech actress
- Petr Chýlek (born c. 1940s), American climatologist
- Radomír Chýlek (born 1967), Czech footballer
