= Zaza Gorozia =

Georgian politician

Zaza Gorozia ზაზა გოროზია

Minister of Agriculture of Georgia
- In office October 20, 2011 – October 16, 2012
- President: Mikheil Saakashvili
- Preceded by: Bakur Kvezereli
- Succeeded by: David Kirvalidze

Personal details
- Born: February 11, 1975 (age 51) Martvili, Georgia

Zaza Gorozia (Georgian: ზაზა გოროზია (born February 11, 1975) is a Georgian politician and the current governor of the Samegrelo-Zemo Svaneti region. He served as the country's Minister of Agriculture from October 20, 2011 to October 25, 2012.

Born in the Gegechkori district of then-Soviet Georgia (now Martvili municipality, Samegrelo-Zemo Svaneti), Zaza Gorozia graduated from the Tbilisi Medical Academy in 1999 and continued his postgraduate studies in the field of health administration. He was a member of the Central Election Commission of Georgia from 2003 to 2004 and Head of Tbilisi Health and Social Care Service from 2004 to 2005. On July 19, 2005, Gorozia was appointed governor of the Samegrelo-Zemo Svaneti region. During the 2008 war with Russia, he was responsible for negotiations with the Russians attacking the region from neighboring Abkhazia. Prior to the May 2010 local election in Georgia, Gorozia became embroiled in controversy over reports of his involvement in pressuring the candidates of the opposition Freedom party to withdraw from the race in the Mestia municipality. Following the incident, Gorozia went on leave from his duties.

On October 20, 2011, Gorozia was appointed Minister of Agriculture of Georgia, replacing Bakur Kvezereli. As envisaged by the constitution of Georgia, he resigned from his position after the ruling United National Movement party lost the October 1, 2012 parliamentary election. On October 16, 2012, President Saakashvili appointed him governor of Samegrelo-Zemo Svaneti region.
