= Piter =

Piter, a variant of the name Peter, may refer to:

People with the surname

- Katarzyna Piter (born 1991), Polish tennis player

People with the given name

- Piter Wilkens (born 1959), Frisian singer, guitarist, composer, lyricist, and producer

People with the nickname

- Píter (footballer), full name Eurípedes Fernandes (1940–2022), Brazilian football defender

Fiction

- Piter (novel), a 2010 novel by Shimun Vrochek set in the Universe of Metro 2033
- Piter De Vries, character from the Dune universe

Other

- FC Piter Saint Petersburg, Russian football team
- General nickname for Saint Petersburg
- PiTER, a Counter Strike: Global Offensive team

== See also ==
- André Piters (1931–2014), Belgian footballer
- U-Piter (band), Russian rock band
- Pieter (disambiguation)
- Pyotr
- Peter (disambiguation)
