= Lya Imber =

Lya Imber (17 March 1914 – 23 September 1981) was a Ukrainian-born Venezuelan pediatrician. She was a prominent pediatrician vice president of UNICEF, and the first woman in Venezuela to earn the degree of Doctor of Medical Sciences, as well as the first female member of the board of the Medical School of the Federal District.

== Biography ==
Imber was born in Odessa, Ukraine on 17 March 1914. Her parents, Naúm Imber and Ana Barú, left Soroca (Moldova) together with Lya, who was 16 years old at the time, and her sister, Sofía, to emigrate to Venezuela.

She graduated from the Central University of Venezuela, earning the degree of Doctor of Medical Sciences, in 1936. She was one of the founders of the Venezuelan Society of Childcare and Pediatrics, and served as treasurer of its first board (from 1939 until 1941) and later as its president (from 1949 until 1951). She worked in the Municipal Children's Hospital Dr. José Manuel De Los Ríos as a resident, then as deputy and head of internal medicine and eventually as Head of Service in 1954. She also worked as director of the First Clinic of Child Mental Hygiene of the Ministry of Health and Welfare (from 1956 until 1958), and as President of the Venezuelan League of Mental Hygiene (from 1972 until 1976.) She had founded the League of Mental Hygiene in 1941. She had two children, María Elena and Fernando Coronil.

She died from cancer in Caracas, Venezuela on 23 September 1981.

== Published works ==
She published several works on her specialties:

- Treatment of Bilharziasis (1954)
- Development of Childcare and Pediatrics in Venezuela from 1926 to 1955
- Post-vaccinial Encephalitis (in collaboration with other doctors)
- Study of Some Cases of Anemia in Childhood (1947)
- The Problem of Rehospitalization and Some Problems of Hospital Assistance for Children
- The Mental Health of Children (with other doctors)
- My Notebook of Childcare (1978)
- Compilation of her Scientific Dissemination Articles (1959)
- Scientific Articles on diario El Nacional (1980)
  - Hunger in Venezuela
  - Quiet Children
  - Breast Milk
