= Venkatachalam Ramaswamy =

Indian climate scientist

- Born: April 28, 1955; India
- Died: June 21, 2026 (aged 71); Philadelphia, Pennsylvania, United States
- Education: Delhi University, State University of New York at Albany
- Scientific career
- Fields: Climate change
- Workplaces: National Center for Atmospheric Research, Geophysical Fluid Dynamics Laboratory

External videos
- "Understanding Trends and Extremes in Climate", Venkatachalam Ramaswamy, Yale University

Venkatachalam Ramaswamy (V. "Ram" Ramaswamy) was the Director of the Geophysical Fluid Dynamics Laboratory of the National Oceanic and Atmospheric Administration (NOAA) Office of Oceanic and Atmospheric Research (OAR), studying climate modeling and climate change. "A leading climate scientist", his work is cited as supporting evidence for significant stratospheric climate change. He focused in particular on radiative transfer models and the hydrologic cycle in the atmosphere. He supported the development of supercomputing approaches that enabled researchers to achieve higher resolution and greater complexity in climate models. As a lead author involved in the Intergovernmental Panel on Climate Change (IPCC), Ramaswamy's contributions (along with the contributions of many scientists) were recognised by the joint award of the 2007 Nobel Peace Prize to the IPCC. He was elected a Member of the National Academy of Sciences in 2025. He died on June 21, 2026 due to complications associated with glioblastoma.

== Early life and education ==
Born in India, Venkatachalam Ramaswamy went to school in a Methodist mission high school, where he received a strong science education. He went on to earn his bachelor's degree (1975) and his master's degree (1977) in Physics, from Delhi University. Although his program focused on theoretical physics, he became interested in practical applications. For the final year of his Master's program, he did independent research, writing a dissertation on the effects of nonspherical raindrops on microwave transmission signals and telecommunications.

In 1977, Ramaswamy came to the U.S. In 1982, he received his Ph.D. in Atmospheric Science from the State University of New York at Albany (SUNY-Albany), where he worked with Petr Chylek From 1983-1985, Ramaswamy held a postdoctoral position at the National Center for Atmospheric Research (NCAR).

== Career ==
In 1987, Ramaswamy accepted a position at the Geophysical Fluid Dynamics Laboratory (GFDL). He became a Physical Scientist and group leader in 1995. He was promoted to Senior Scientist and group leader in 2000. After the retirement of Ants Leetmaa in January 2006, Ramaswamy became Acting Lab Director, then Director in November 2008. Since 1995, Ramaswamy has also taught atmospheric physics at Princeton University.

Ramaswamy has been instrumental in the Intergovernmental Panel for Climate Change: Since 1992 he has been a Lead Author or Coordinating Lead Author for each of the IPCC's assessment reports. He has also served on the Joint Scientific Committee of the World Climate Research Program."

"Climate change research is very important because one needs to understand how and why it has changed and is changing, how rapidly, by which mechanisms, and determine the impacts on key climate variables... What has been most special in the last 50 years is the expansion of knowledge on climate processes, variations and change – on the short and long timescales, and including the emergence of the knowledge of human influence on climate."

== Awards and honours ==
In 2007, the contributions of many scientists, including Ramaswamy, to the IPCC was recognized by the Nobel Peace Prize. The award was given jointly to the IPCC and to Albert Arnold Gore Jr., "for their efforts to build up and disseminate greater knowledge about man-made climate change, and to lay the foundations for the measures that are needed to counteract such change."

Ramaswamy is a three-time recipient of the WMO Norbert-Gerbier MUMM International Award from the World Meteorological Organization (WMO) which he received as a co-author of papers published in 2013, 2003, and 1998.

He is an elected fellow of the American Geophysical Union as of 2008, and has been a member of the American Geophysical Union since 1983.

He became an elected fellow of the American Meteorological Society as of 2005 or 2006. He was recognized by the AMS as the Walter Orr Roberts Lecturer in Interdisciplinary Sciences for 2016. In 1994, he was awarded the Henry G. Houghton Award of the American Meteorological Society.

As of 2005, he received the United States Presidential Rank Award for Meritorious Senior Professional. He has also received both the Gold Medal (2002, 2007) and the Silver Medal (2005) of the Department of Commerce. He is recognized as an NOAA Distinguished Author (1992, 1993, 1996, 2000, 2002, 2008) and has received the NOAA Administrator Award (2014)

He has been recognized with a number of international professorships and lectureships, including the Professor K. R. Ramanathan Distinguished Professorship, Ahmedabad, India (2004); the Bert Bolin Lecturer, Stockholm University (2009); and the Sir Gilbert Walker Distinguished Professorship, Indian Institute of Technology, Delhi, India (2013-2016)

He was named a Fellow of the American Physical Society in 2021.
