= Petreasa =

Petreasa is a Romanian placename, referring to several villages in Romania:

- Petreasa, a village in Horea Commune, Alba County
- Petreasa, a village in Remetea Commune, Bihor County

== See also ==
- Petre (disambiguation)
- Petreni (disambiguation)
- Petrești (disambiguation)
