= Petreni =

Petreni may refer to:

Villages in Romania

- Petreni, a village in Bucium, Alba
- Petreni, a village in Mărtiniș Commune, Harghita County
- Petreni, a village in Băcia Commune, Hunedoara County

Commune in Moldova

- Petreni, Drochia

== See also ==
- Petre (disambiguation)
- Petrești (disambiguation)
- Petreasa (disambiguation)
