= Petteri Kupiainen =

Finnish former footballer (born 1960)

Personal information
- Date of birth: 26 February 1960 (age 66)
- Place of birth: Kuopio, Finland
- Position: Midfielder

Youth career
- KuPS

Senior career*
Years	Team	Apps	(Gls)
1978–1979	KuPS	36	(6)
1979–1981	Club Brugge	18	(3)
1981–1989	KuPS	144	(2)

International career
1979–1981	Finland	5	(0)
- * Club domestic league appearances and goals

Petteri Kupiainen (born 26 February 1960) is a Finnish former professional football player who played as a midfielder for Mestaruussarja side KuPS and Belgian club Club Brugge. He represented Finland in youth national teams, before making his full international debut in 1979.

== Career statistics ==
Appearances and goals by national team and year
National team	Year	Apps	Goals
Finland	1979	3	0
Finland	1980	1	0
Finland	1981	1	0
Total		5	0

== Honours ==
KuPS

- Finnish Cup: 1989
