= Petre Tsiskarishvili =

Georgian politician (born 1974)

- პეტრე ცისკარიშვილი

Ministry of Environment and Natural Resources Protection of Georgia
- In office 2006 – 2008
- President: Mikheil Saakashvili; Nino Burjanadze (acting); Mikheil Saakashvili
- Prime Minister: Zurab Nogaideli; Giorgi Baramidze (acting); Lado Gurgenidze
- Preceded by: Mikheil Svimonishvili
- Succeeded by: Bakur Kvezereli

Governor of Kakheti
- In office 2004 – 2006
- President: Mikheil Saakashvili
- Prime Minister: Zurab Zhvania; Mikheil Saakashvili (acting); Zurab Nogaideli
- Preceded by: Tamaz Khidesheli
- Succeeded by: Gia Natsvlishvili

Personal details
- Born: 27 February 1974 (age 52) Tbilisi, Georgian SSR, Soviet Union
- Party: United National Movement
- Education: Tbilisi State University

Petre Tsiskarishvili (Georgian: პეტრე ცისკარიშვილი; born 27 February 1974 in Tbilisi, Georgian SSR) is a Georgian economist and politician, notable for his extensive career in the Georgian government, including roles as the minister of agriculture and multiple terms in the Parliament of Georgia. Tsiskarishvili has been a pivotal figure in Georgian politics, particularly noted for his leadership roles within the United National Movement party.

== Early life and education ==
Tsiskarishvili was born in Tbilisi and moved to the United States for his secondary education, graduating from Basalt High School in Colorado. He returned to Georgia for higher education, where he attended Tbilisi State University, studying international relations and law between 1991 and 1992. Tsiskarishvili furthered his education in the United States at Augsburg Institute in Minneapolis, where he studied from 1993 to 1997, earning a degree in economics.

== Political career ==
Tsiskarishvili's political career began in the late 1990s. He was first elected as a member of the Parliament of Georgia in the 5th convocation from 1999 to 2004, representing the Union of Citizens of Georgia party. During this term, he served on several key committees and was involved in significant legislative initiatives.

From 2004 to 2006, Tsiskarishvili served as the Governor of the Kakheti region, after which he was appointed as the Minister of Agriculture (2006-2008). His political influence expanded when he became a leader of the parliamentary majority during the 7th Term of the Parliament of Georgia from 2008 to 2012, under the banner "The United National Movement - For Winning Georgia."

During the 8th Term of the Parliament of Georgia (2012-2016), he served as the Deputy Chairman and Leader of the Parliamentary Minority, advocating for policies under the faction "The United National Movement – More Benefit to People." Throughout his terms, he was involved in various committees, notably the Budget and Finance Committee and the Agrarian Issues Committee.

== International roles and contributions ==
Tsiskarishvili has also been an active participant in international affairs, representing Georgia in several parliamentary assemblies and international organizations. His roles have included serving as head of the Parliamentary Delegation to the Parliamentary Assembly of the Council of Europe (PACE) and participating in the NATO Parliamentary Assembly.

He has been involved in the Parliamentary Association Committees between Georgia and the European Union and other diplomatic groups, such as the GUAM Organization for Democracy and Economic Development.

== Kidnapping ==
In 2001, Tsiskarishvili and his fiancée, Ana Surmava, were kidnapped by criminals in Tbilisi. The incident was a high-profile case that captured national attention due to its violent nature and the profile of the victims. The couple was released without any conditions or ransom, and the Interior Ministry spokesperson, Kakhi Targamadze, clarified that the kidnapping was criminal rather than political. This event underscored the challenges of crime in Georgia during a tumultuous period.

== Current activities ==
In recent years, Tsiskarishvili continues to be an influential figure in Georgian politics. On 10 January 2022 he was elected as the General Secretary of the "United National Movement," signaling his ongoing commitment to Georgia's political development and international diplomacy.

Throughout his career, Tsiskarishvili has been recognized for his dedication to the Georgian state and its people, navigating complex political landscapes both domestically and internationally.
