= Petteri Rasi =

Finnish ice hockey player

- Born: 22 January 1990 (age 35); Kuopio, Finland
- Height: 5 ft 11 in (180 cm)
- Weight: 181 lb (82 kg; 12 st 13 lb)
- Position: Forward
- Shot: Left
- Played for: KalPa
- NHL draft: Undrafted
- Playing career: 2008–2011

Petteri Rasi (born 22 January 1990) is a Finnish former professional ice hockey player who played for KalPa of the SM-liiga.

== See also ==
- Ice hockey in Finland
