= Petr Chelčický =

15th-century Bohemian Christian radical

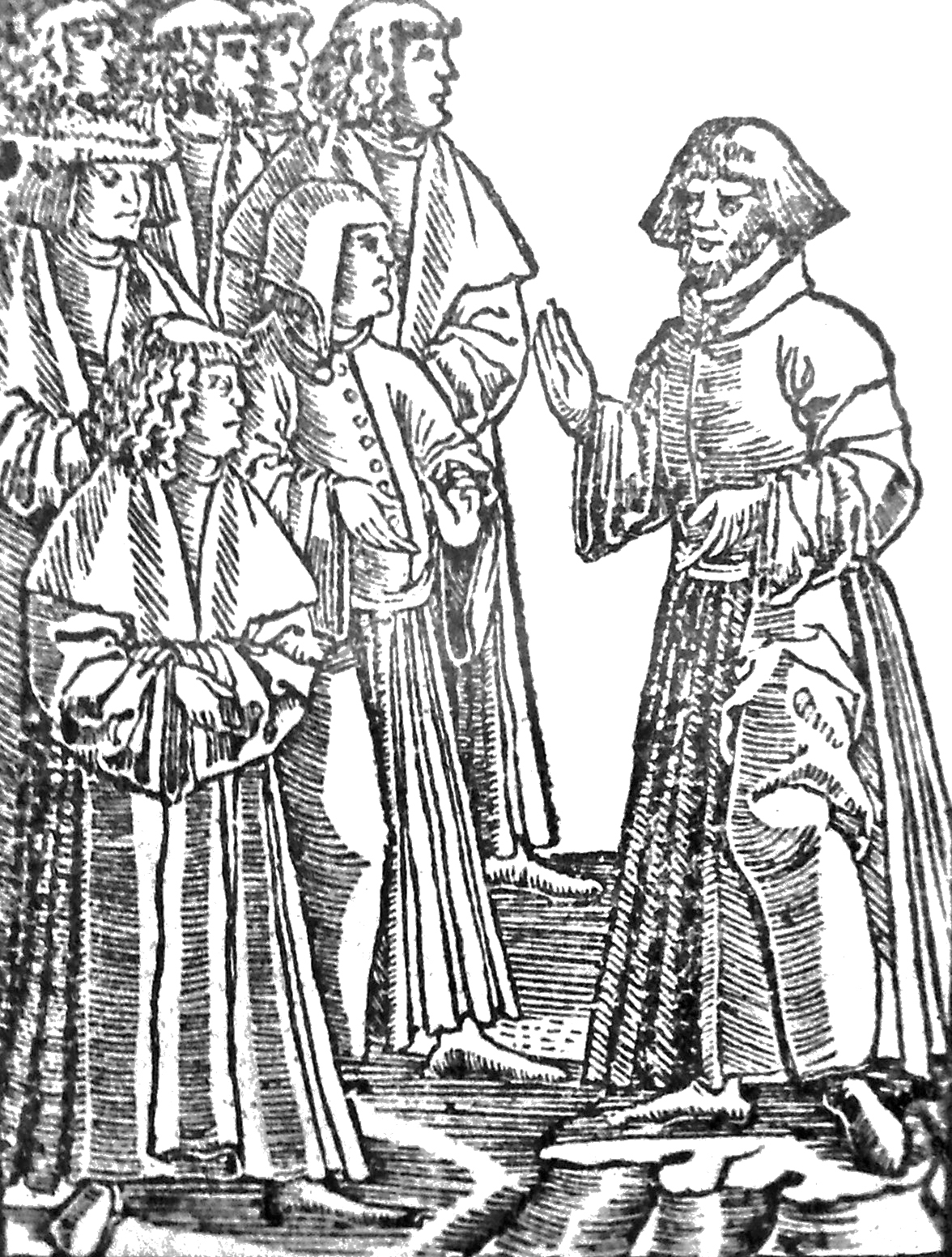
- Chelčický talking with masters of the University of Prague
- Born: c. 1390 AD; Chelčice, Bohemian Kingdom (present-day Czech Republic)
- Died: c. 1460 AD; Chelčice

Philosophical work
- Era: Medieval philosophy
- Region: Western philosophy
- School: Christian pacifism
- Main interests: Social philosophy; Waldensian Church; Moravian Church; Baptist Union in the Czech Republic; Leo Tolstoy
- Notable ideas: Non-violence

Petr Chelčický (Czech: [ˈpɛtr̩ ˈxɛltʃɪtskiː]; c. 1390 – c. 1460) was a Czech Christian spiritual leader and author in 15th-century Bohemia, now the Czech Republic. He was one of the most influential thinkers of the Bohemian Reformation. Chelčický inspired the Unitas Fratrum, who opposed transubstantiation and monasticism, insisting on pacifism and the primacy of scripture. There are multiple parallels with the teachings of the Anabaptists and Chelčický. Czech Baptists have also expressed continuity with the Bohemian reformation by identifying with Chelčický.

His published works critiqued the immorality and violence of the contemporary church and state. He proposed a number of Bible-based improvements for human society, including nonresistance, which influenced humanitarians Tolstoy, Gandhi, and Martin Luther King. Paradoxically, the main part of the Hussite movement rejected his teachings of nonviolence, which eventually led to violence among the Hussite movement. Chelčický's teachings laid the foundation of the Unity of the Brethren.

== Early life ==
Petr Chelčický is thought to have been born in southern Bohemia in about 1390, although one theory puts his birth as early as 1374. Very little is known about his personal history. Different historians have called him a serf, an independent farmer, a squire, a nobleman, a cobbler, a priest, and a Waldensian. On one occasion, Chelčický called himself a peasant, but this description is at odds with his ability to live in Prague from 1419 to 1421, his rudimentary knowledge of Latin, and the time he was able to devote to literary, political, and religious pursuits.

It is certain that he was unusually literate for a medieval man without a regular academic education. After 1421, he lived and farmed in the village of Chelčice, near Vodňany. He produced 56 known works, but the majority remain unpublished and inaccessible except in the original manuscripts. His thinking was influenced by Thomas of Štítný, John Wycliffe, Jan Hus, and the Waldensian tradition. He died around 1460.

== Teachings ==
Chelčický's teachings included ideas later adopted by the Moravians, Anabaptists, Quakers, and Baptists. He was the first pacifist writer of the Renaissance, predating Erasmus and Menno Simons by nearly 100 years.

=== Scripture ===
Chelčický believed in a strict adherence to the principle of sola scriptura and read the Bible in the vernacular. His strict adherence to sola scriptura caused Chelčický to occasionally contradict John Wycliffe and other Hussites. He rejected the papacy and Catholic hierarchy, believing that the early church had no pope, kings, lords, inquisitions or crusaders.

Chelčický believed that purgatory is an example of the Church corrupting the New Testament by adding traditions; thus, he denied the doctrine of purgatory.

=== Church and state ===
Chelčický called the Pope and the emperor (the church and the state) "whales who have torn the net of true faith" because they established the church as the head of a secular empire. Chelčický believed that Christians should follow the law of love and so should not be compelled by state authority. He taught that the believer should not accept government office or even appeal to its authority, as for the true believer to take part in government was sinful. He argued that capital punishment and other forms of violent punishment were wrong. His positions on government are similar to the Christian anarchist principles of Leo Tolstoy. Tolstoy praised Chelčický's work in his 1894 book The Kingdom of God is Within You.

The man who obeys God needs no other authority (over him).

— Petr Chelčický

=== Nonviolence and war ===
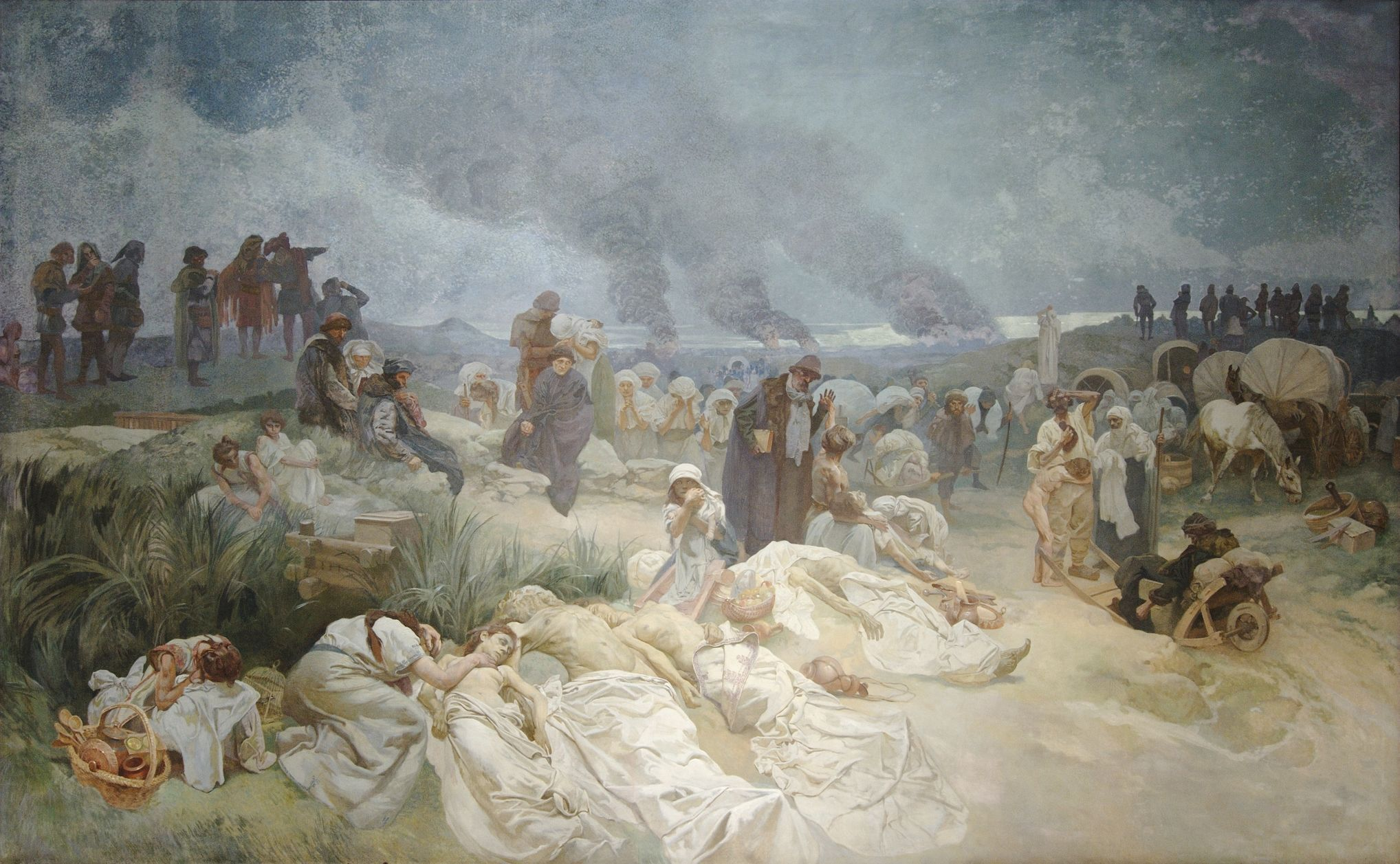
Painting of Chelčický instructing others to not repay evil with evil (1918, by Alphonse Mucha, The Slav Epic)

As early as 1420, Chelčický taught that violence should not be used in religious matters. Chelčický used the parable of the wheat and the tares to show that both the sinners and the saints should be allowed to live together until the harvest. He thought that it is wrong to kill even the sinful and that Christians should refuse military service. He argued that if the poor refused, the lords would have no one to go to war for them.

Chelčický taught that no physical power can destroy evil, and that Christians should accept persecution without retaliating. He believed that even defensive war was the worst evil and thought that soldiers were no more than murderers. He believed the example of Jesus and the Gospel was an example of peace.

=== Communal living ===
Chelčický believed that there must be complete equality in the Christian community. He said there should be no rich or poor since the Christian relinquished all property and status. He maintained that Christians could expel evil persons from their community but could not compel them to be good. He believed in equality but that the state should not force it upon society and went so far as to proffer that social inequality is a creature of the state and rises and falls with it.

According to Karl Kautsky in Communism in Central Europe in the Time of the Reformation, "The nature of the first organisation of the Bohemian Brethren is not at all clear, as the later Brothers were ashamed of their communistic origin, and endeavoured to conceal it in every possible way." Some of Chelčický's statements tend to indicate that he thought only the poor were genuine Christians.

=== Priesthood of the believer ===
Chelčický criticized the use of force in matters of faith. He taught that the Christian should strive for righteousness of their own free will but must not force others to be good and that goodness should be voluntary. He believed that the Christian must love God and one's neighbor and that is the way to convert people rather than by compulsion. He maintained that any type of compulsion is evil and that Christians should not participate in political struggles.

=== Sacraments ===
Chelčický advocated for baptism to be generally administered to those who are of later age. However, he did not completely forbid infant baptism, allowing it if the parents would assure their education in the faith. He additionally did not propose re-baptism. Chelčický did not believe that baptism by itself could save but is a part of the process of salvation which included instruction, confirmation and discipleship.

He additionally rejected transubstantiation but did not hold to memorialism, which was taught by radical Hussites.

=== Other teachings ===
Chelčický based his teaching on the Sermon on the Mount, renouncing violence, bearing arms and oaths. He also supported asceticism and believed celibacy to be a holier state than marriage.

Chelčický opposed indulgences and paying masses for the dead. Later he protested against the Utraquists making compromises with the Catholic church, seeing it as a reunion with the Antichrist.

Chelčický held that apostolic succession is not determined by laying on of hands but it is a matter of the clergy following the teaching of Christ.

== Author ==
Chelčický is the author of approximately 50 treatises that have survived. All are written in Czech.

O boji duchovním ("On Spiritual Warfare"), written in 1421, was his first major work. In it, Chelčický argued that the Taborites had participated in violence through the devil's deceit and the lust for the things of the world. He also criticized the chiliasts, opposed physical warfare and noted that obligations of debts gave lenders power over debtors.

In O trojiem lidu řeč ("On the Triple Division of Society") Chelčický criticized the nobility, the clergy and the middle class. He describes how they subjected the common people and rode them "as if they were beasts".

In Síť Víry ("Net of Faith"), his final and most comprehensive work written around 1440, he argues that the apostles treated people as equals, considered Christ as their only head, and that early Christians followed Jesus's instruction of loving one another - thus having no need for rulers or criminal courts. It was in this book that he argued that the Emperor and the Pope were the two great "whales" that burst the "net of faith" - a metaphor for the inclusion of pagan values and practices into the teachings of Christ. The book also includes some commentary on the Council of Basel.

== Influence ==
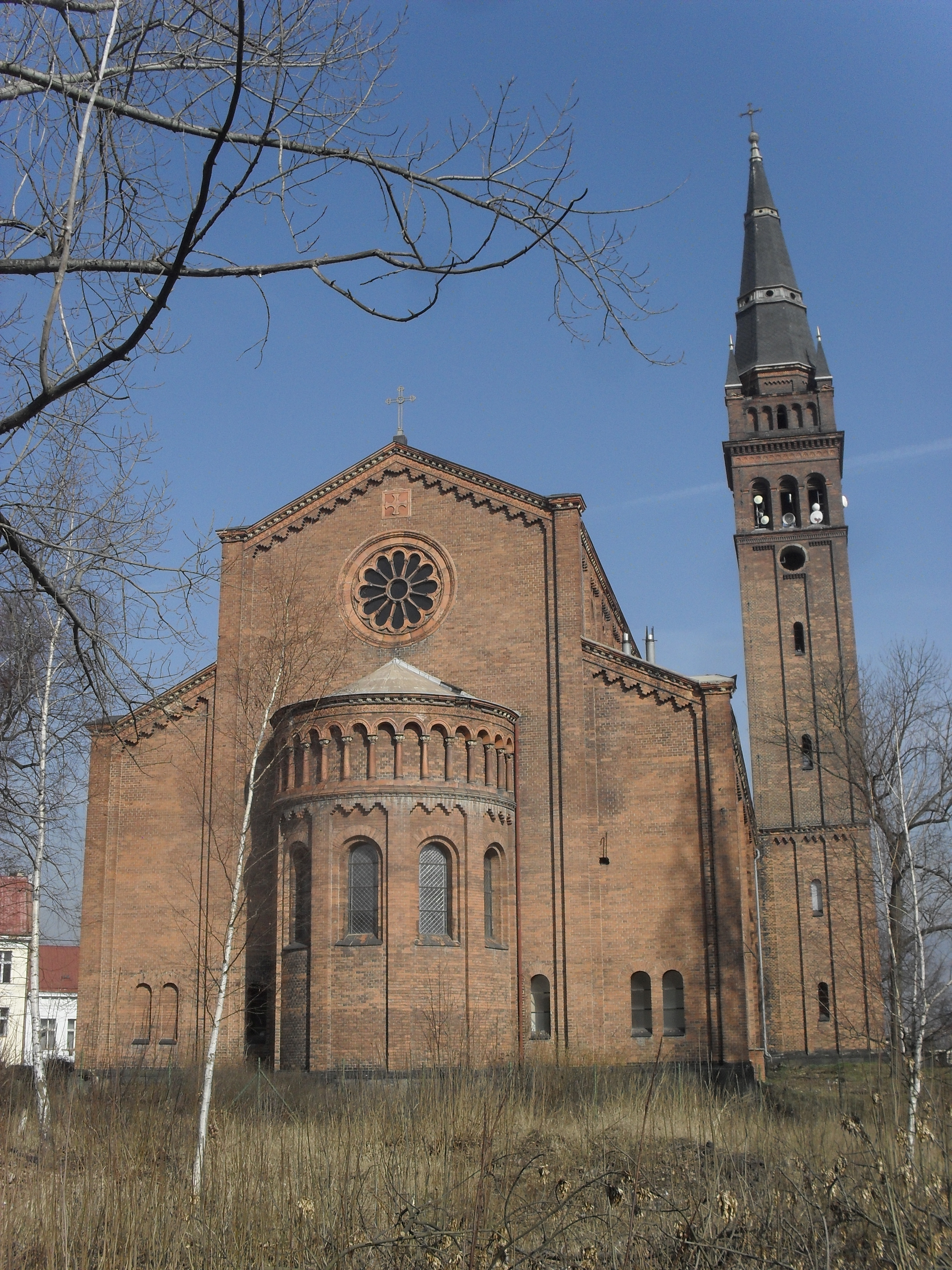
Several streets in the modern Czech Republic are named Chelčického after Chelčický. This street in Teplice has a church dedicated to Bartholomew the Apostle.

Chelčický has been called "the foremost thinker of the 15th-century Czech Hussite Reformation movement." He certainly was an influential thinker among the Bohemian brethren of his day. Beyond his own time, his influence can be seen in the Moravians (Unitas Fratrum), Unity of the Brethren (Jednota Bratrská), and even the Baptist Union in the Czech Republic (also known as the Unity of Brethren Baptists). Important similarities can be seen between his teachings and the Continental Anabaptists, and, to a lesser extent, the English Baptists, though no direct connections have been shown to exist. He emphasized the New Testament as the exclusive and final source to know the will of God. He held two sacraments: baptism and the Lord's Supper. He encouraged people to read and interpret the Bible for themselves.

Chelčický's work, specifically Net of Faith, influenced Leo Tolstoy and is referenced in his book The Kingdom of God Is Within You. His name appears as "Helchitsky" in many English translations (following the Russian transliteration Хельчицкий).

Whoever is not of God cannot truly enjoy or hold anything belonging to God, except as the man of violence unlawfully enjoys and holds what is not his own.

— Petr Chelčický

== Bibliography ==
The following is a list of Chelčický's known works

- Antikristova poznáne tato sú (These Are the Marks of Antichrist)
- Devět kusův zlatých (Nine Pieces of Gold)
- Jiná řeč o šelmě a obrazu jejiem (Another Sermon on the Beast and Its Image)
- Kterak ne ve všem za prvotnie církve vokazovali kněžie aneb podávali (How Priests Have Not Preached According to the Early Church in All Things)
- Kterak života svého nemáme milovati, ale raději nenáviděti (How We Do Not Have Love for Life but Prefer to Hate)
- List knězi Mikulášovi (Letter to Father Mikuláš)
- List Mikuláši a Martinovi (Letter to Mikuláš and Martin)
- List Mistru Janovi (Letter to Master Jan)
- My blázni pro Krista (We Fools for Christ)
- Nebo neposlal mě jest Kristus křtíti, ale kázati (For Christ Did Not Send Me to Baptize but to Preach)
- O boji duchovním (On Spiritual Warfare)
- O církvi svaté (On the Holy Church)
- O milování Boha (On Love of God)
- O moci světa (On the Power of the World)
- O nejvyšším biskupu Pánu Kristu (On the Highest Bishop, the Lord Christ)
- O očistci (On Purgatory)
- O očistci pravém a jistém a nejistém (On the Truth of Purgatory, Its Certainty and Uncertainty)
- O pokoře (On Humility)
- O poznání sebe samého (On Recognition of Oneself)
- O rotách českých (On the Czech Factions)
- O rozeznání duchuov pro blud řeč (On the Differentiation of the Spirits)
- O sedmi hříeších hlavních (On the Seven Cardinal Sins)
- O staré a nové víře a o obcování svatých (On the Old and New Faith and on the Fellowship of the Saints)
- O svědectví (On Witnessing)
- O svědomí (On Conscience)
- O šelmě a obrazu jejiem (On the Beast and Its Image)
- O těle božím (On the Body of Christ)
- O tělu a krvi Páně (On the Body and Blood of the Lord)
- O trestání srdce (On the Punishment of the Heart)
- O trojiem lidu řeč (On the Three Estates)
- O zlých knězích (On Evil Priests)
- O ztraceném synu (On the Prodigal Son)
- Obrana Markoltova (Markolt's Defense)
- Postila (The Polstilla - Sunday Bible commentaries for the whole year)
- Pro nenie hodné člověka na smrť vydati (Man Should Not Be Given the Death Penalty for Theft)
- Replika proti Mikuláši Biskupci (Reply to Bishop Mikuláš)
- Replika proti Rokycanovi (Reply to Rokycana)
- Řeč a zpráva o těle božím (Sermon and Instructions on the Body of Christ)
- Řeč na 20. kap. sv. Matouše (Sermon on the 20th Chapter of St. Matthew)
- Řeč o milování božím (Sermon on the Love of God)
- Řeč o základu zákonů lidských (Sermon on the Foundation of Human Laws)
- Řeč sv. Pavla o člověku starém a novém (Sermon of St. Paul on the Old and New Man)
- Řeči besední Tomáše ze Štítného (The Conversations of Tomáš Štítný)
- Síť Viry (Net of Faith)
- Spis proti kněžím (Writing Against the Priests)
- Traktát o večeři Páně proti Biskupcovi (Exposition on the Lord's Supper Against the Bishop)
- Výklad na čtení sv. Jana v 1. kap. (Exposition on the passage from St. John, First Chapter)
- Výklad na kap. 14. epištoly sv. Pavla k Římanům (Exposition on Chapter 14 of the Epistle of St. Paul to the Romans)
- Výklad na Mat. 22:37–39 (Exposition of Matthew 22:37–39)
- Výklad na Otčenáš (Exposition of the Lord's Prayer)
- Výklad na pašijí sv. Jana (Exposition on the Passion of St. John)
- Výklad na řeč so. Jana v 2. epištole (Exposition on the Sermon of St. John in the Second Epistle)
- Výklad na řeč sv. Pavla (Exposition on the Sermon of St. Paul)
- Výklad na slova sv. Pavla (Epišt. k Tím., 1:5-8) (Exposition on the Words of St. Paul in his Epistle to Timothy 1:5-8)
- Výklad Řím. 13:1-3 (Exposition of Romans 13:1-3)
- Zpráva o svátostech (Instructions on the Sacraments)

== See also ==
- Christian libertarianism
- Christian pacifism
- Nonviolence
- The Slav Epic (Painting: Petr Chelčický at Vodňany: Do not repay evil with evil)
