= Agriculture in Georgia (country) =

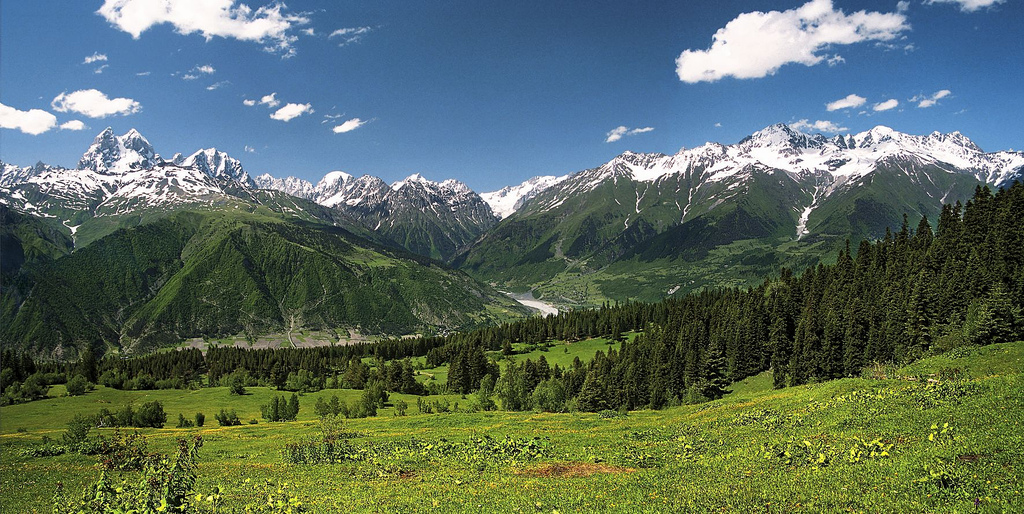
The climate of Georgia makes it ideal for growing corn and harvesting grapes and tea

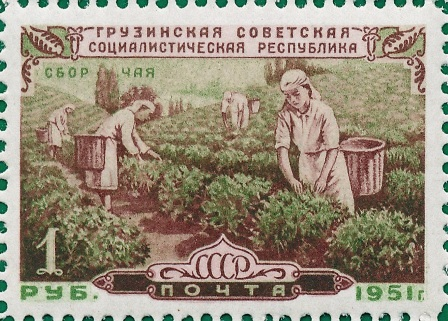
Tea production in Georgia, depicted on a 1951 Soviet postage stamp

Georgia’s climate and soil have made agriculture one of its most productive economic sectors; in 1990, the 18 percent of arable Georgian land generated 32 percent of the republic's net material product. Since the end of the Soviet period, there has been a decline in the agricultural labor force: some 25 percent of the Georgian workforce was engaged in agriculture in 1990; 37 percent had been so engaged in 1970.

In the Soviet period, swampy areas in the west were drained and arid regions in the east were salvaged by a complex irrigation system, allowing Georgian agriculture to expand production tenfold between 1918 and 1980. However, production was hindered in the Soviet period by the misallocation of agricultural land, such as the assignment of prime grain fields to tea cultivation and excessive specialization. Georgia’s emphasis on labor-intensive crops such as tea and grapes kept the rural workforce at an unsatisfactory level of productivity.

As of 2011, 281,000 hectares of land were sown, representing 35.0% of the arable land;1,823,000 head of livestock were cataloged; and agribusiness represented 9.3% of the national GDP. 2012 preliminary data shows agribusiness contribution as 8.4% of GDP.

== Production ==
In 2018 Georgia produced:

- 260 thousand tons of grapes;
- 237 thousand tons of potatoes;
- 194 thousand tons of maize;
- 107 thousand tons of wheat;
- 82 thousand tons of apples;
- 62 thousand tons of tangerines;
- 57 thousand tons of barley;
- 57 thousand tons of watermelon;
- 51 thousand tons of tomatoes;
- 33 thousand tons of cucumbers;
- 27 thousand tons of peaches;

In addition to smaller amounts of other crops.

== Crops ==
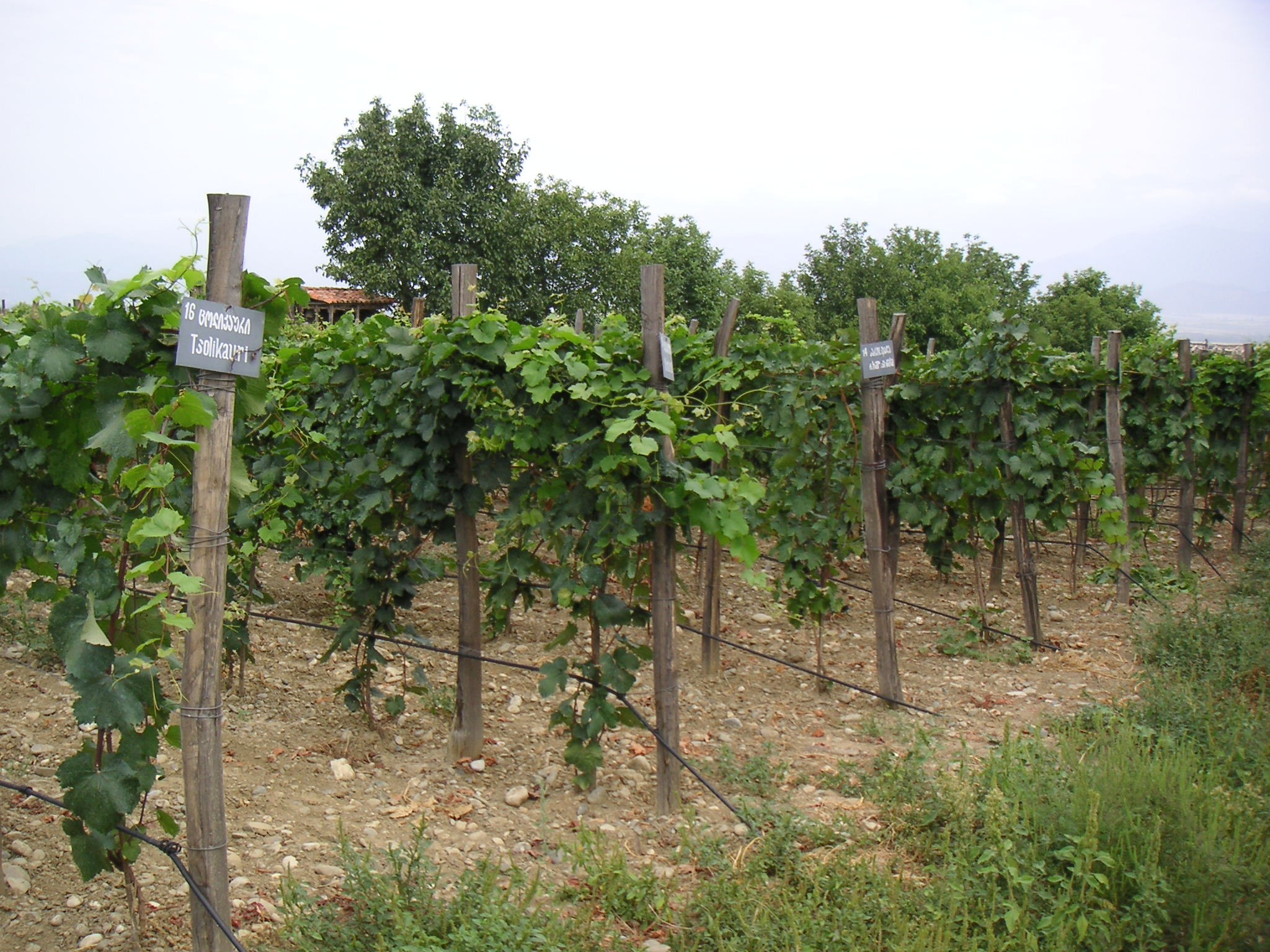
An experimental vineyards in Georgia

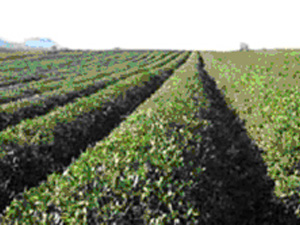
A tea plantation in Guria, recently rehabilitated by USAID farmer-assistance project in Georgia

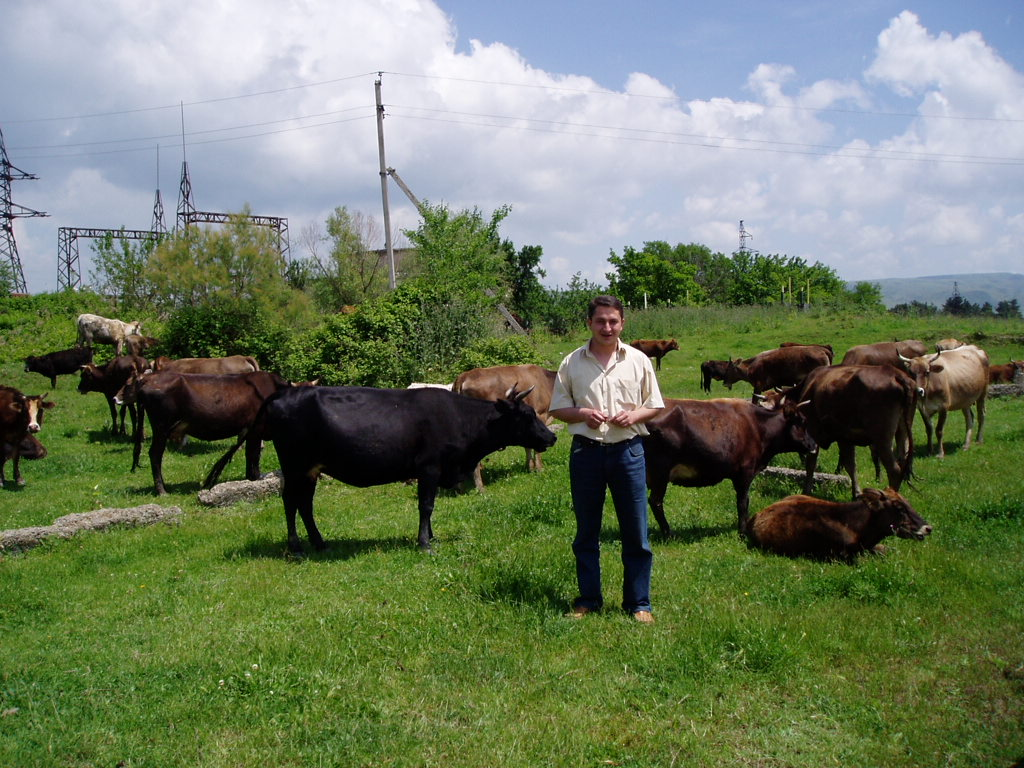
A cattle farmer on a recently privatized farm outside Tbilisi

Georgia primarily grows grains: in 1993, about 85 percent of cultivated land excluding orchards, vineyards, and tea plantations, was dedicated to grains. Within that category, corn grew on 40 percent of the land, and winter wheat on 37 percent. The second most important agricultural product is grapes, which are then used to make famous Georgian wines. Georgia has one of the world's oldest and finest winemaking traditions; archeological findings indicate that wine was being made in Georgia as early as 300 B.C. Some forty major wineries were operating in 1990, and about 500 types of local wines are made. The center of the wine industry is Kakhetia in eastern Georgia. Georgia is also known for the high quality of its mineral waters.

Other important crops are tea, citrus fruits, and noncitrus fruits, which account for 18.3 percent, 7.7 percent, and 8.4 percent of Georgia's agricultural output, respectively. Cultivation of tea and citrus fruit is confined to the western coastal area. Tea accounts for 36 percent of the output of the large food-processing industry, although the quality of Georgian tea dropped perceptibly under Soviet management in the 1970s and 1980s. Animal husbandry, mainly the keeping of cattle, pigs, and sheep, accounts for about 25 percent of Georgia's agricultural output, although high density and low mechanization have hindered efficiency.

Until 1992, other Soviet republics bought 95 percent of Georgia's processed tea, 62 percent of its wine, and 70 percent of its canned goods. In turn, Georgia depended on Russia for 75 percent of its grain. One-third of Georgia's meat and 60 percent of its dairy products were supplied from outside the republic. Failure to balance these relationships contributed to Georgia's food crises in the early 1990s during the Soviet Union's collapse.

== Land distribution ==
During the Soviet era, agriculture was characterized by absolute state ownership of all agricultural land and concentration of production in large-scale collective farms, which averaged 428 hectares in size. When Georgia became independent after the dissolution of the Soviet Union at the end of 1991, the entire country was in total disarray, facing a bitter civil war. Georgian agriculture collapsed, and the land held by large collective farms was quickly distributed to rural households in an attempt to avoid famine. This desperate goal was achieved as Georgian agriculture quickly recovered in 1993–95. The recovery raised the volume of agricultural production in recent years by 25–30% above its lowest level in 1993, yet the initial collapse was so dramatic that agricultural output in 2006 was still 40% below what it was in 1990.

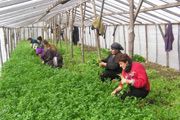
An agrobusiness in Georgia

Even under Soviet rule, Georgia had a vigorous private agricultural sector, producing crops and livestock on small plots allocated to rural residents and town dwellers in the life estate fashion. In 1990, according to official statistics, the private sector contributed 46% of gross agricultural output, and private farm productivity averaged about twice that of state farms.

As was the case with enterprise privatization, President Gamsakhurdia postponed systematic land reform because he feared that local mafias would dominate the redistribution process. Gamsakhurdia was deposed in early 1992, and within weeks the new government issued a land reform resolution providing land grants of one-half hectare to individuals with the stipulation that the land be farmed. Commissions were established in each village to inventory land parcels and identify those to be privatized. Limitations were placed on what the new "owners" could do with their land, and would-be private farmers faced serious problems in obtaining seeds, fertilizer, and equipment. By the end of 1993, over half the cultivated land was in private hands. Small plots were given free to city dwellers to relieve the acute food shortage that year.

Georgia completely individualized its agriculture as early as 1992–93. The individual sector in Georgia currently produces almost 100% of agricultural output, up from 40% before 1990. The shift of production to the individual sector is a reflection of the dramatic increase in the landholdings of rural households. Prior to 1990, only 7% of agricultural land was individual use. A decade later, in 2000, 37% of agricultural land (or more than 70% of arable land) is used by individual farmers.

The universality of land distribution to rural families produced relatively small landholdings. Thus, the average size of an individual farm in Georgia is 0.96 hectares and only 5% of farms are larger than 2 hectares.

Size distribution of individual farms in Georgia (early 2000s)

Farm size	Percent of individual farms
Up to 0.5 ha	22.1
0.5–1 ha	29.7
1–2 ha	43.6
More than 2 ha	4.6
Mean size	0.96 ha

== Recruiting of foreign farmers ==
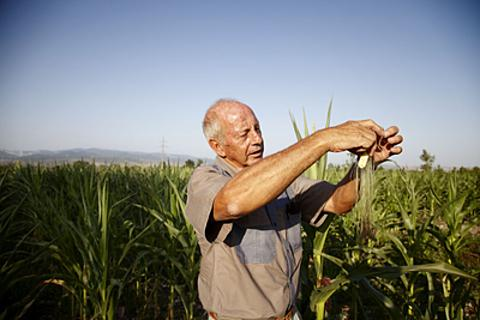
Afrikaner farmer in Georgia.

Sandra Roelofs, the Dutch-born wife of Georgian Former President Mikhail Saakashvili, has promoted a program encouraging Afrikaans South African farmers to migrate to Georgia. The country is actively recruiting Afrikaner farmers to help revive the nation's moribund agriculture. In the 20 years since the collapse of the Soviet Union, half of Georgia's farmland has gone out of production.

Recently Indian farmers (mostly from Punjab) have also shown interest and invested in agriculture of Georgia. Punjabi farmers are known for their hard work and Punjab is called the food basket of India, it remains to be seen what difference do these farmers make in agriculture and economy of Georgia. However, most of them had returned to India as they faced numerous problems in marketing their harvests and being repeatedly refused residence permit appeals.

== Government ==
=== Land Laws ===
In 2017 and 2018 Georgia banned the sale of agricultural land to foreigners in the Georgian constitution. The new constitution says that agricultural land is a ‘resource of exceptional significance’ and can be owned only by ‘the state, a self-governing entity, a citizen of Georgia, or a union of Georgian citizens’.

=== Ministry of Agriculture ===
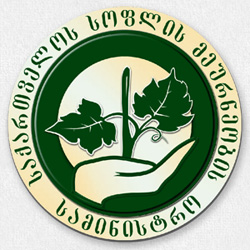

The Ministry of Environmental Protection and Agriculture of Georgia (Georgian: საქართველოს გარემოს დაცვისა და სოფლის მეურნეობის სამინისტრო, sakartvelos garemos datsvisa da soplis meurneobis saministro) is a governmental agency within the Cabinet of Georgia in charge of regulation of economic activity in the agricultural sector of the country and environment protection with a purpose of increasing the sector's production capacity. The ministry is headed by Otar Shamugia.

== See also ==
- Georgian Wine

== External resources ==
- Assessment of the Agriculture and Rural Development Sectors in the Eastern Partnership Countries. Georgia (Budapest. FAO, 2012)
- GEORGIA - Agricultural Census 2003/2004 - Main Results (FAO, 2005)
- Smallholders and family farms in Georgia (Budapest. FAO, 2020, ISBN 978-92-5-132972-6)
