= Marinette (loa) =

Spirit in Louisiana voudou

Marinette (Vodou)
- Venerated in: Haitian Vodou, Folk Catholicism
- Attributes: Black pig, black roosters, owls, black, red, peppers, werewolves
- Patronage: Fire

Marinette is a loa of power and violence in Haitian Vodou. In her petro form, she is called Marinette Bras Cheche (Marinette of the Dry Arms) or Marinette Pied Cheche (Marinette of the Dry Feet), suggesting that she is skeletal.

She is believed to be the mambo who sacrificed the black pig at the culmination of the start of the first Haitian Revolution. While she is feared and tends to ride those she possesses violently, she can also be seen as one who frees her people from bondage.

Marinette is represented by a screech owl and is often seen as the protector of werewolves. Her Catholic counterpart is the Anima Sola (Forsaken Soul) who can either free one from bondage or drag you back. Her colors are black and deep blood red. Her offerings are black pigs and black roosters plucked alive.

Marinette is not cruel. She only gets cruel in possession, when people burn animals or humans. She likes salvia, black pepper, lavender, and sweets.
