= Petra (Illyria) =

Ancient settlement in Illyricum

Petra (Ancient Greek: Πέτρα) was an ancient settlement in Illyricum. Julius Caesar writes that it was situated upon a hill upon the coast, which had only a moderately good harbour. Its site is tentatively located near modern Shkëmbi i Kavajës.

== See also ==
- List of settlements in Illyria
