= Petra, Kentucky =

Unincorporated community in Kentucky, United States

Petra
- Unincorporated community
- Location within the state of Kentucky Petra (the United States)
- Coordinates: 38°37′27″N 84°8′2″W
- Country: United States
- State: Kentucky
- County: Bracken
- Elevation: 919 ft (280 m)
- Time zone: UTC-5 (Eastern (EST))
  - Summer (DST): UTC-4 (EDT)
- GNIS feature ID: 508809

Petra is an unincorporated community located in Bracken County, Kentucky, United States.

A post office called Petra was established in 1864, and remained in operation until 1904.
