= Dan Petro =

Haitian Vodou deified houngan

Dan Petro (a.k.a. Jean Petro, Dompèdre, and Dompète) is a violent lwa (spirit) of Haitian Vodou, the deification of the legendary founder of the Petwo rite, the houngan (priest) Dom Pedro. He was described as a Mulatto Dominican maroon in contemporary colonial writing, but recognized in modern historiography as Kongolese. An anti-slavery agitator, Dom Pedro was ultimately executed by the French colonial authorities; his name became a moniker for similar houngan dissidents in the early years of the Haitian Revolution, and he became deified as Dan Petro, Kriminel, and Ti Jean.

== Etymology ==
"Dom Pedro" was a contemporary, Christianized name among the Kongo people in the 18th century, with the given name Peter reflecting the prevalence of the Catholic Church in Kongo, and the honorific Dom (emulating the colonial Portuguese Angolans) denoting social rank. The name was first translated to Spanish (i.e. Don Pedro), then later creolized as Dan Petro or Jean Petro. The name was further embellished from there to Jean Phillipe Pedro.

== Life and legend ==
The provenance of Dom Pedro is disputed. The first written description of Dom Pedro was by French lawyer Médéric Louis Élie Moreau de Saint-Méry, who described Dom Pedro as a freedman in Saint-Domingue, further as a Spaniard and Afro-Caribbean (suggesting he was Mulatto Haitian). Historians including Serge Larose and Michel Laguerre write that Dom Pedro was likely a mulatto maroon escaping west from the Spanish Captaincy General of Santo Domingo. However, historians like David Geggus and Crystal Eddins identify Dom Pedro as being Kongolese instead, based on his name's etymology and the provenance of the eponymous Petwo rite. Haitian ethnologist Jean Price-Mars further hypothesized that Dom Pedro was a member of the "Lemba", a Kongolese religious ngoma society that was formed in response to the Atlantic slave trade: Price-Mars links slave sabotage and insurrection to the Lemba's anti-slavery ethos.

Dom Pedro was based in Léogâne in the 1760s. Moreau de Saint-Méry described Dom Pedro in Petit-Goave in 1768 to be spreading a ritual dance called the "Dance of Dom Petro" (Danse à Don Pèdre), described as more intense compared to the contemporary, ophiolatric "Voudoux" ritual. Participants would drink rum with gunpowder, sometimes to lethal effect; the combination evoked Atlantic slave trade barters in the Kongo, where rum and gunpowder were key European trade goods traded for slaves.

The Maréchaussée of Saint-Domingue banned the Dance of Dom Petro on grounds of agitation. Dom Pedro was said to have driven slave uprisings with reprisal whippings of slave-drivers, agitating for emancipation; he was ultimately captured and executed by colonial authorities.

Dom Pedro's historicity within popular folklore is disputed. David Geggus notes how many of Dom Pedro's folkloric traits mirror those of another legendary houngan, Jérôme Poteau: both were said to mix gunpowder with rum, and Dom Pedro has been identified with the same chalkstone talismans and fighting sticks that Poteau was.

=== Archetypal name in Saint-Domingue ===
In the 18th century, "Dom Pedro" became an archetypal name for proto-Petwo houngan freeman dissidents. In December following the 1791 slave rebellion, Sim dit Dompete (potentially from Simbi) of Les Cayes was called "Dom Pedro", and was particularly influential in Nippes. He was targeted by the Maréchaussée to make an example of him, and he was killed while on the run. Saint-Domingue Creole planter Louis Drouin de Bercy described "Dom Pedros" as young nighttime petty thieves and womanizers who carry sticks and whips, claiming stockmen, carters and postillions to be their common daytime professions. Luc de Heusch notes that the described youthfulness of the Don Pedros per Drouin de Bercy does line up with the younger Kongolese generation of slaves at the time, compared to the older West African slaves that practiced early voudoux.

== Apotheosis ==
Dom Pedro was deified into the lwa, with multiple lwa believed to be his apotheosis. The eponymous "Dan Petro" (also Jean Petro, Dompèdre, and Dompète) was held by anthropologist Harold Courlander as the inaugural lwa of the Petwo rite. Dan Petro is described as a strong, violent and cannibalistic lwa. Pigs are the traditional ritual sacrifice to him. His rituals often include the burning of gunpowder.

Kriminel and Ti Jean are both also held as an apotheosis of Dom Pedro. Ti Jean in particular is sometimes described as Dan Petro's son.
