= Petr Chýlek =

Petr Chýlek (born c. 1940s) is a Czech-born American climatologist. He is a researcher for Space and Remote Sensing Sciences at Los Alamos National Laboratory.

== Life and career ==
Chýlek received his diploma in theoretical physics from Charles University in Prague, Czechoslovakia. He emigrated to the United States in 1968, after the Prague Spring. He received his Ph.D. in physics from UC Riverside in 1970. Prior to becoming a government researcher in 2001, Chýlek was a professor at several American and Canadian universities, including SUNY Albany, Purdue University, University of Oklahoma and Dalhousie University in Halifax, Canada.

Chýlek has published over 100 first authored scientific papers in remote sensing, atmospheric radiation, climate change, cloud and aerosol physics, applied laser physics and ice core analysis. His work has been cited more than 14000 times. Chýlek is best known for his work in remote sensing, aerosols and climate change.

In 2006, Chýlek served as Chairman, Scientific Program Committee for The Second International Conference on Global Warming and the Next Ice Age held at Los Alamos National Laboratory in Santa Fe, NM. Speakers included Venkatachalam Ramaswamy, Chris Folland, Gerald North, Roger A. Pielke, William M. Gray and Jan Veizer. The conference included a two-day workshop on climate prediction uncertainties. The papers presented at the 2006 Conference were published in a special section of the Journal of Geophysical Research – Atmospheres in 2007.

Chýlek and co-authors presented a paper at the Fall 2007 meeting of the American Geophysical Union estimating climate sensitivity to doubled atmospheric CO_{2} to be significantly less than the IPCC estimate. The IPCC estimate is confirmed by both historical and current data. There are no peer-reviewed papers by Petr Chýlek that take a negative or explicitly doubtful position on human-caused global warming.

== Honors ==
- Fellow of the Optical Society of America (elected 1989)
- Fellow of the American Geophysical Union (elected in 2006)
- Fellow of the Los Alamos National Laboratory (named in 2006)
