= Petra in Aegypto =

Hellenistic city and bishopric in Roman Egypt

Petra in Aegypto (also spelled Petra in Ægypto) was a Hellenistic city and former bishopric in Roman Egypt and remains a Latin Catholic titular see.

== History ==
Petra in Aegypto, identified with modern Hagar-En-Nauatiyeh, was important enough in the Roman province of Aegyptus Primus (civil Diocese of Egypt), to become a suffragan of the Patriarchate of Alexandria, but faded, presumably at the advent of Islam.

Little is known not even a single historically documented bishop, as it isn't mentioned in classical reference works like Lequien's Oriens Christianus.

== Titular see ==
The diocese was nominally restored in 1933 as Latin Titular bishopric of Petra in Ægypto (Latin) / Petra di Egitto (Curiate Italian) / Petren(sis) in Æypto (Latin adjective).

It remains vacant, without a single incumbent. It is of the Episcopal (lowest) rank.

== See also ==
- List of Catholic dioceses in Egypt

== Sources and external links ==
- GCatholic
