= Petra (Corinthia) =

Petra (Ancient Greek: Πέτρα) was an ancient settlement belonging to ancient Corinthia. Herodotus, who calls the place a deme (a district or municipality), mentions Petra as the origin of Cypselus, tyrant of Corinth. When he was a child, the Bacchiadae family, then reigning in Corinth, planned to assassinate him to try to avoid an oracle that had predicted that the child was going to overthrow them. That is why several of them went to Petra to kill him but his mother safely hid him in a chest or an ark.

It has been suggested that Petra was in an elevated place south of Corinth. However, its precise location is unknown.
