= Petri (disambiguation) =

Petri is a surname. Petri may also refer to:

- Petri (given name), a given name
- Petri dish, a glass or dish used in cell cultures
- Petri disease or young vine decline, a plant disease
- Petri net, a mathematical representation of discrete distributed systems
- Petri Camera Co. Ltd., manufacturer of cameras and lenses
