= Petrești, Ungheni =

Petrești
- Commune
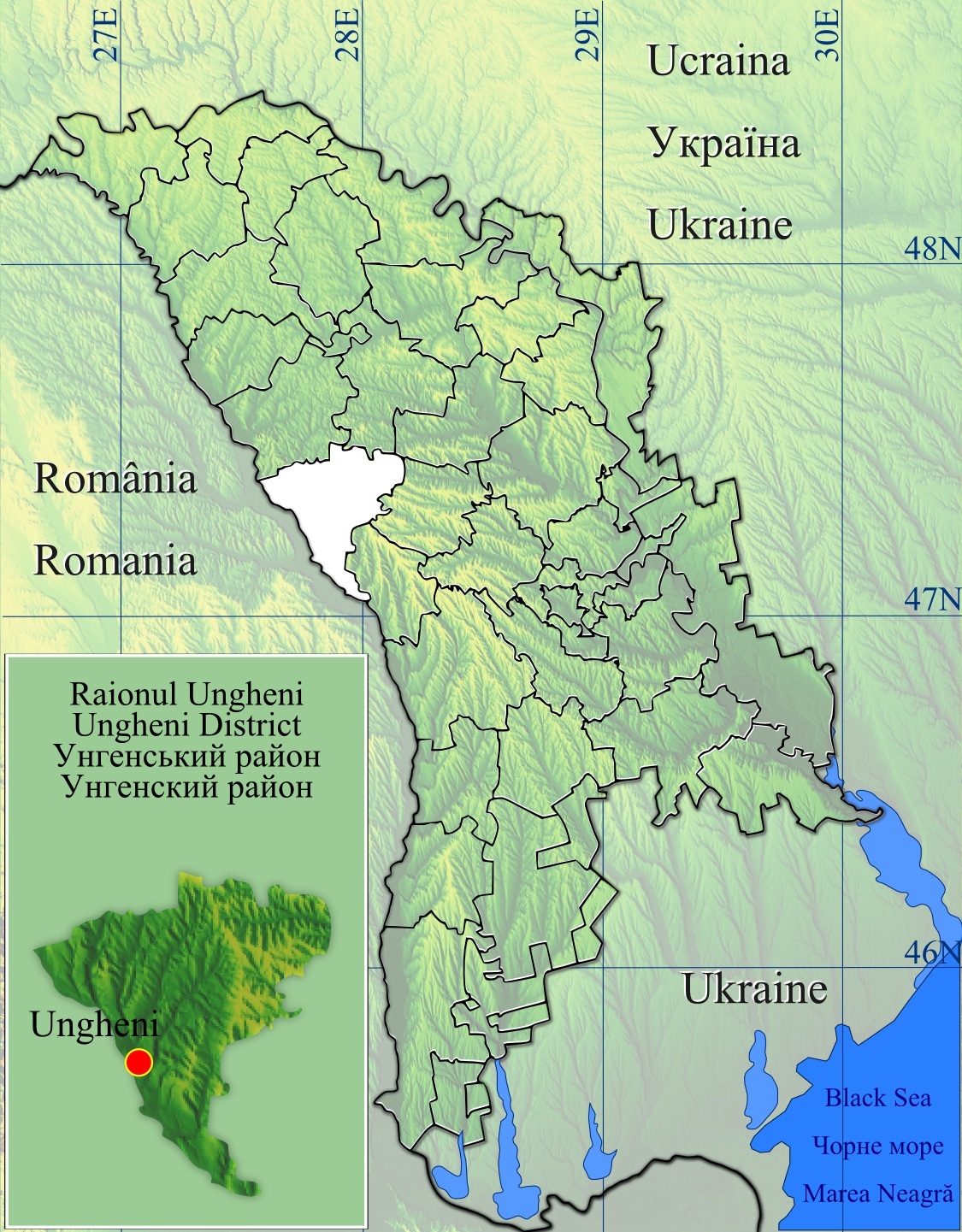
- Location within Ungheni
- Coordinates: 47°18′25″N 27°44′51″E
- Country: Moldova
- District: Ungheni District

Government
  - Mayor: Serghei Gorea, 2012

Area
  - Total: 4,501.01 ha (11,122.2 acres)

Population (2014)
  - Total: 4,003
- Time zone: UTC+2 (EET)
  - Summer (DST): UTC+3 (EEST)
- Postal code: MD-3640
- Website: www.facebook.com/groups/petresti/about

Petrești is a commune in Ungheni District, Republic of Moldova. It is composed of three villages: Petrești, Petrești station and Medeleni. The commune of Petrești has a population of 4,003 people according to the 2014 Moldovan census.

Petrești suffered a fire in March 2022.
