= Perta (Lycaonia) =

Town of ancient Lycaonia

Coordinates: 38°10′04″N 33°04′36″E

Perta was a town of ancient Lycaonia, inhabited in Roman and Byzantine times. The town appears as Petra on the Tabula Peutingeriana.

Its site is located near Gimir, known as İpekler in Karatay district, Asiatic Turkey.
