= Epistle of Peter =

There are two Epistles of Peter in the New Testament:

- First Epistle of Peter
- Second Epistle of Peter

== See also ==
- Authorship of the Petrine epistles
- Letter of Peter to Philip
