= Andrew Apter =

American historian (born 1956)

- Born: December 7, 1956 (age 69)

Academic work
- Discipline: History
- Institutions: University of California, Los Angeles

Andrew Herman Apter (born December 7, 1956) is an American historian, professor at University of California, Los Angeles, and Director of the African Studies Center.

He was field director of Black Atlantic Studies, for the Social Science Research Council.

== Awards ==
- 2010 Guggenheim Fellow

== Works ==
- Beyond Words: Discourse and Critical Agency in Africa, University of Chicago Press, 2007, ISBN 978-0-226-02352-6
- Black Critics and Kings: The Hermeneutics of Power in Yoruba Society, University of Chicago Press, 1992, ISBN 978-0-226-02342-7
- The Pan-African Nation: Oil and the Spectacle of Culture in Nigeria, University of Chicago Press, 2005, ISBN 978-0-226-02355-7
- "Atinga Revisited", Modernity and its malcontents: ritual and power in postcolonial Africa, Editors Jean Comaroff, John L. Comaroff, University of Chicago Press, 1993, ISBN 978-0-226-11440-8
- "IBB = 419: Nigerian Democracy and the Politics of Illusion", Civil society and the political imagination in Africa: critical perspectives, Editors John L. Comaroff, Jean Comaroff, University of Chicago Press, 1999, ISBN 978-0-226-11413-2
