= Golăiești =

- Commune
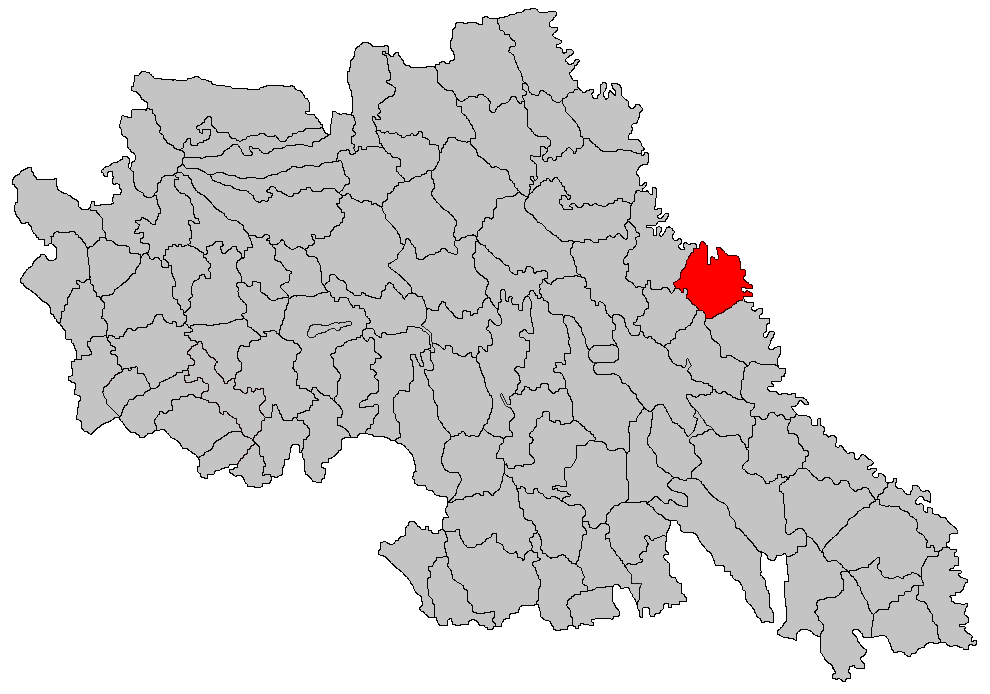
- Location in Iași County

- Location in Romania
- Coordinates: 47°15′N 27°42′E
- Country: Romania
- County: Iași
- Subdivisions: Golăiești, Bran, Cilibiu, Cotu lui Ivan, Grădinari, Medeleni, Petrești, Podu Jijiei

Government
  - Mayor (2024–2028): Costel Manoliu (PNL)
- Area: 53.96 km^{2} (20.83 sq mi)
- Elevation: 38 m (125 ft)
- Population (2021-12-01): 3,563
  - Density: 66/km^{2} (170/sq mi)
- Time zone: EET/EEST (UTC+2/+3)
- Postal code: 707200
- Area code: +40 x32
- Vehicle reg.: IS
- Website: www.golaiesti.ro

Golăiești is a commune in Iași County, Western Moldavia, Romania. It is composed of eight villages: Bran, Cilibiu, Cotu lui Ivan, Golăiești, Grădinari, Medeleni, Petrești and Podu Jijiei.

Composer Valentin Radu is a native of the commune.
