= Bakur Kvezereli =

Georgian-American entrepreneur

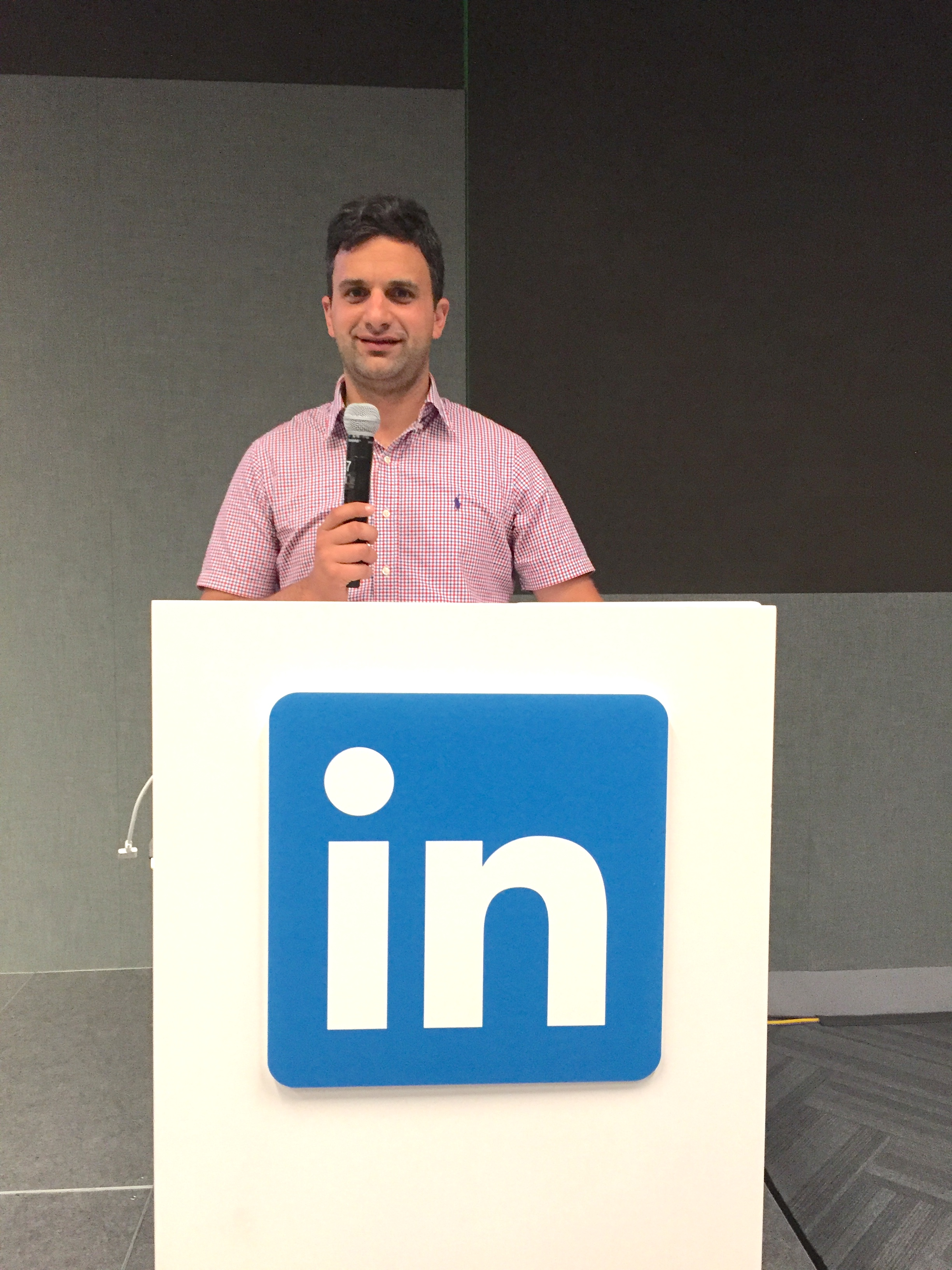

Personal details
- Born: January 5, 1981 (age 45) Tbilisi, Georgia

Bakur Kvezereli (Georgian: ბაკურ კვეზერელი; born January 5, 1981) is a Georgian-American entrepreneur. He is a co-founder of specialty food marketplace Maiaki and autonomous electric tractor startup Ztractor.

== Early years and Education ==
Kvezereli was born on January 5, 1981, in Tbilisi, Georgia. His great-grandfather George Kvezereli was a member of European trade guild and owner of multinational salt trading company. He was a philanthropist and financial supporter of Tbilisi State University.

Bakur Kvezereli is a graduate of Massachusetts Institute of Technology (MIT). He is the Mastercard and Legatum Fellow.

== Career and awards ==
Before emigrating to the United States Bakur was working on agriculture and food trade policy in different counties including Romania, Kenya and his motherland Georgia. Where he held a position of the Minister of Agriculture in 2008–2011. For the exceptional service he was awarded The Presidential Order of Excellence and Order of Honor.

== See also ==
- Georgian-Americans
- List of Georgians
- Cabinet of Georgia
