= Petri (given name) =

Petri is a given name derived from the Latin name Petrus. It is very common in Finland. Petri may refer to:

- Petri Aho, Finnish guitarist
- Petri Forsman, Finnish orienteer
- Petri Haapimaa (born 1976), Finnish football player
- Petri Hawkins-Byrd (born 1957), American television personality
- Petri Helin (born 1969), Finnish football player
- Petri Hiltunen (born 1967), Finnish cartoonist
- Petri Jalava (born 1976), Finnish football player
- Petri Järvinen (born 1965), Finnish football player
- Petri Kaverma (born 1963), Finnish artist
- Petri Keskitalo (born 1967), Finnish decathlete
- Petri Koivisto (born 1986), Finnish ice hockey goaltender
- Petri Kokko (born 1966), Finnish figure skater
- Petri Kokko (born 1969), Finnish speedway rider
- Petri Kokko (born 1975), Finnish ice hockey player
- Petri Kontiola (born 1984), Finnish ice hockey player
- Petri Korte (born 1966), Finnish darts player
- Petri Koskinen (born 1983), Finnish ice hockey player
- Petri Krohn (born 1960), Finnish political activist
- Petri Kuljuntausta (born 1961), Finnish composer
- Petri Lammassaari (born 1985), Finnish ice hockey player
- Petri Liimatainen (born 1969), Swedish ice hockey player
- Petri Lindroos (born 1980), Finnish guitarist
- Petri Matikainen (born 1967), Finnish ice hockey coach
- Petri Tapio Mattson (born 1973), Finnish violinist
- Petri Mór (1863–1945), Hungarian author
- Petri Nygård (born 1975), Finnish rap-artist
- Petri Oravainen (born 1983), Finnish football player
- Petri Pakaslahti (born 1976), Finnish ice hockey player
- Petri Pasanen (born 1980), Finnish football player
- Petri Purho (born 1983), Finnish rapid game prototyper
- Petri Salo (born 1964), Finnish educational researcher
- Petri Skriko (born 1962), Finnish ice hockey player
- Petri Sulonen (1963–2024), Finnish football player
- Petri Suvanto (born 1992), Finnish racing driver
- Petri Tiainen (born 1966), Finnish football player
- Petri Tiili aka Pelle Miljoona (born 1955), Finnish punk rock musician
- Petri Tuomi-Nikula (born 1951), Finnish diplomat
- Petri Varis (born 1969), Finnish ice hockey player
- Petri Vehanen (born 1977), Finnish ice hockey goaltender
- Petri Viljanen (born 1987), Finnish football player and referee
- Petri Virtanen (born 1980), Finnish basketball player
- Petri Vuorinen (born 1972), Finnish football player
- Petri Walli (1969–1995), Finnish guitarist and vocalist
- Petri Ylönen (born 1962), Finnish born French ice hockey goaltender
