= Petrus (given name) =

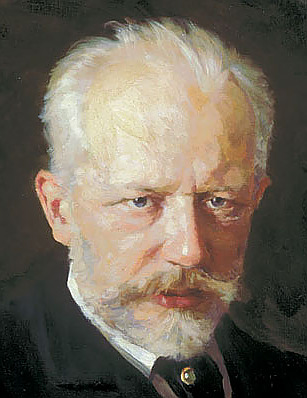
Pyotr I. Tchaikovsky

Petrus is the Latin form of the Greek name Πέτρος (pétros) meaning "rock", and is the common English prefix "petro-" used to describe rock-based substances, like petros-oleum or "rock oil." As the source of Peter, it is a common name for people from antiquity through the medieval era. In the Netherlands, Belgium and South Africa it remained a very common given name, though in daily life, many use less formal forms like Peter, Pierre, Piet and Pieter.

== People with the name ==
- Petrus, Saint Peter, a Christian apostle and a founder of the Church
- Petrus (archbishop of Uppsala), third archbishop of Uppsala, Sweden, between 1187–1197
- Justinian I, whose given name was Petrus Sabbatius

== Latinized medieval and Renaissance name ==
- Petrus Abailardus, Latin name for Peter Abelard (1079–1142)
- Petrus de Abano (Pietro d'Abano; 1257–1315), Italian philosopher and doctor
- Petrus Alphonsi (fl. 1106–1110), Spanish Jewish writer
- Petrus Augustus (545–602), Byzantine curopalates
- Petrus Aureolus (1280–1322), French theologian
- Petrus Baldus de Ubaldis (1327–1400), Italian jurist
- Petrus Bernardinus (1475–1502), Florentine sectarian
- Petrus Bertius (Pieter de Bert; 1565–1629), Flemish theologian, historian, geographer and cartographer
- Petrus Bonus (Pietro Boni; fl. 1330s), Italian alchemist
- Petrus Canisius (Pieter Kanis; 1521–1597), Dutch Jesuit Catholic theologian
- Petrus Capuanus (fl. 1197–1214), Italian scholastic
- Petrus Christus (ca. 1410/1420 – ca. 1475/76), Dutch painter
- Petrus Comestor (Pierre le Mangeur; died c.1178), French theological writer and university administrator
- Petrus de Cruce (fl. 1290–1302), Italian cleric, composer, and author
- Petrus Cunaeus (Peter van der Kun; 1586–1638), Dutch philosopher
- Petrus de Dacia (1230s–1289), Swedish monk, first author in Sweden
- Petrus Dasypodius (Peter Hasenfratz, ca. 1495–1559), Swiss humanist
- Petrus Dathenus (Pieter Datheen; c.1531–1588), Dutch Calvinist theologian
- Petrus Diaconus (Pietro Diacono; c.1110–c.1159), Italian librarian of Montecassino
- Petrus Divaeus (Pieter van Dieven;1535–1581), Flemish historian
- Petrus Dorlandus (Peter van Diest; 1451–1507), Flemish writer of the play Elckerlijc (translated into Everyman)
- Petrus Forestus (Pieter van Foreest; 1521–1597), Dutch physician
- Petrus de Natalibus (fl. 1400), Venetian hagiographer
- Petrus Peregrinus or Peter de Maricourt (fl. 1269), French writer on magnetism and astrolabes
- Petrus Plancius (Pieter Platevoet; 1552–1622), Netherlandish astronomer, cartographer and clergyman
- Petrus Ramus (1515–1572), French humanist, logician, and educational reformer

== Modern given name ==
- Petrus van der Aa (1530–1594), Brabantian jurist
- Petrus Beukers (1899–1981), Dutch Olympic sailor
- Petrus Johannes Blok (1855–1929), Dutch historian
- Petrus Bosman (1928–2008), South African ballet dancer, teacher, and choreographer
- Petrus Boumal (born 1993), Cameroonian footballer
- Petrus Breitenbach (born 1987), South African lawn bowler
- Petrus Camper (1722–1789), Dutch polymath
- Petrus Codde (1648–1710), Dutch Old Catholic Archbishop of Utrecht
- Pierre Cuypers (1827–1921), Dutch architect
- Petrus Josephus Wilhelmus Debije (1884–1966), Dutch-American physicist, Nobel laureate in Chemistry
- Petrus Augustus de Génestet (1829–1861), Dutch poet and theologian
- Petrus Ferdinandus Johannes van Hooijdonk (born 1969), Dutch footballer
- Petrus de Jong (1915–2016), Dutch Prime Minister
- Petrus Jacobus Joubert (1834–1900), Commandant-General of the South African Republic
- Piet Keizer (1943–2017), Dutch footballer
- Petrus Adrianus Kerstens (1896–1958), Dutch minister of Economic Affairs
- Petrus Canisius van Lierde (1907–1995), Dutch/Belgian Vicar General for the Vatican City State
- Petrus Andreas van Meeuwen (1772–1848), Dutch politician and lawyer
- Petrus Palmu (born 1997), Finnish ice hockey player
- Petrus Albertus van der Parra (1714–1775), Governor-General of the Dutch East Indies
- Petrus Johannes Schotel (1808–1865), Dutch marine painter
- Petrus Joseph Triest (1760–1836), Flemish Catholic priest, founder of the Sisters and Brothers of Charity
- Petrus Antonius Verheyen (1931–2021), Dutch economist
- Petrus Vuyst (1691–1732), Governor of Dutch Bengal and Dutch Ceylon
- Petrus Johannes Waardenburg (1886–1979), Dutch ophthalmologist and geneticist
- Petrus Cornelis Constant Wiegman (1885–1963), Dutch artist
- Petrus Josephus Zoetmulder (1906–1995), Dutch expert in the Old Javanese language

== See also ==
- Henricus Petrus (1508–1579), Swiss printer
- Petri (given name)
- Petrus (disambiguation)
- Petrus (surname)
