= Caves of Maastricht =

Collection of limestone quarries in the Netherlands

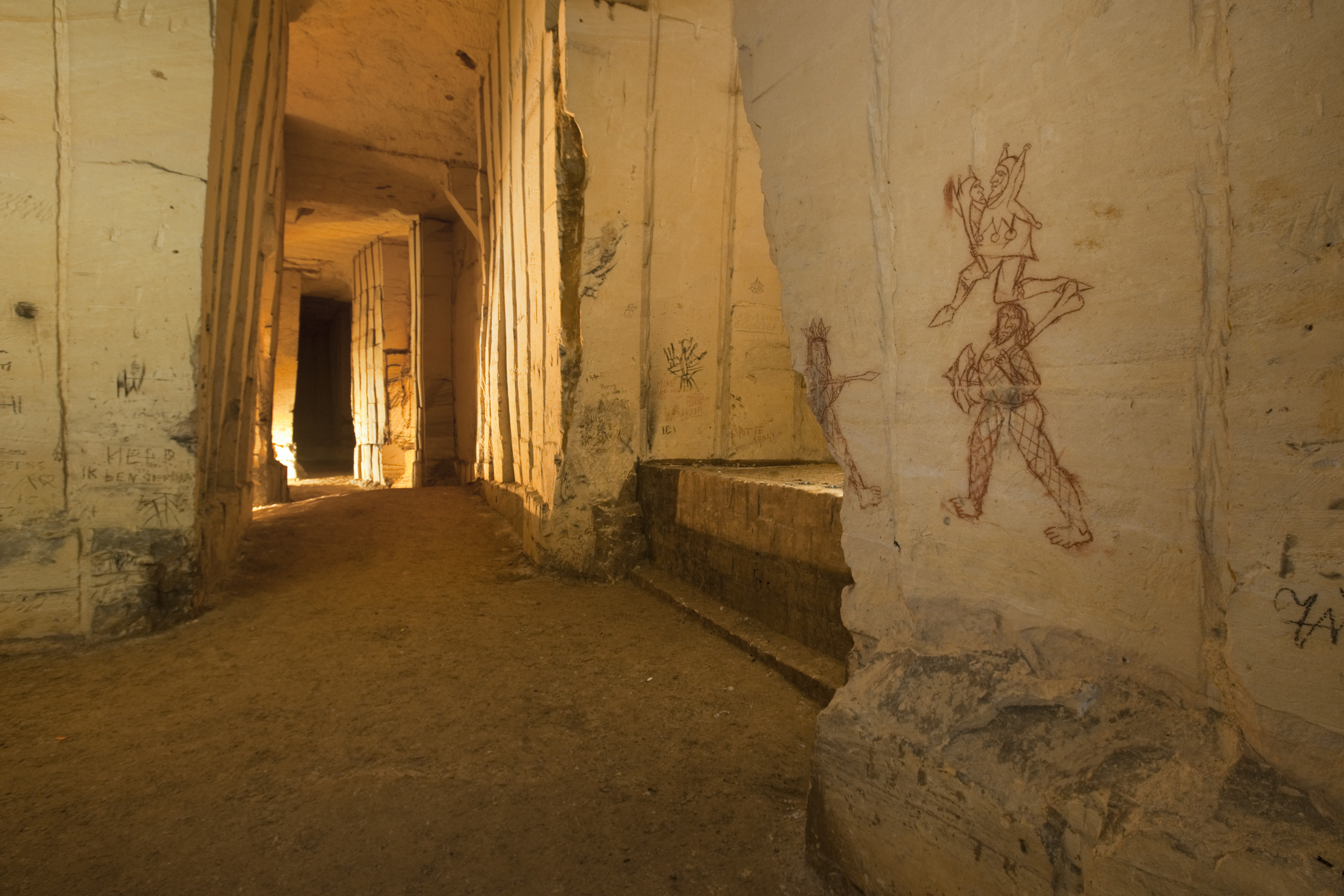
One of the quarries

The Caves of Maastricht, also known as the caves of Mount Saint Peter or the Maastricht Underground, are a collection of limestone quarries in Maastricht, the Netherlands, the origins of which date back to the 13th century.

They were originally dug to mine chalk. In total, a network of 20,000 tunnels were cut into the stone, of which 8,000 are still intact.

The quarries were eventually no longer used for mining, as the value of lime dropped. Over the centuries, art was drawn on the quarry walls, providing an attraction to tourists who can tour some of the quarry sections.

During World War II, the quarry was used to store valuable paintings and armaments that could be used against the Germans, including a proposed force of 30 tanks that would sortie against the Germans that was timed to attack at the same point of liberation. In addition to the military, over 6,000 citizens took shelter in the quarries during World War II. After the war, there were plans to use the underground complex as a bomb shelter.

Among the paintings hidden in the quarries during WWII was The Night Watch by Rembrandt van Rijn. The canvas which measures 363 × 437 cm was detached from its frame and rolled into a large cylinder.

A large portion of the former tunnel system no longer exists as the encompassing limestone was quarried in an open-cast mine operated by ENCI. Quarrying was ceased in 2018.

== See also ==
- Mosasaur
- Kőbánya cellar system
- Mines of Paris
- Odessa Catacombs
- Beer Quarry Caves
