= Piet =

Piet may refer to:

== People ==
- Piet (given name), a list of people with the name
- Piet (surname), a list of people with the name

== Schools ==
- Pakistan Institute of Engineering and Technology, Multan, Punjab, Pakistan

== Other uses ==
- Piet (programming language)
- Piet (horse), American thoroughbred racehorse
