= Piet (given name) =

Dutch male given name

Pieter
- Pronunciation: Dutch: [ˈpit]
- Gender: male
- Language: Dutch

Origin
- Origin: Greek
- Meaning: rock
- Region of origin: The Netherlands, Belgium, South Africa

Other names
- Related names: Pieter, Dieter, Peter, Pierre, Pete, Pietro, Piotr, Petr, Petar, Peder

Piet (Dutch pronunciation: [ˈpit]) is a masculine given name derived from Petrus. It is also a short form (hypocorism) of Petrus and Pieter. It is a common Dutch and South African name, the latter because of Dutch colonisation. Notable people with the name include:

- Piet Akkermans (1942–2002), Dutch classical scholar
- Piet Allegaert (born 1995), Belgian cyclist
- Piet Bergveld (born 1940), Dutch electrical engineer
- Piet Bleeker (1928–2018), Dutch long-distance runner
- Piet Botha (musician) (1955–2019), South African musician
- Piet Botha (cricketer) (born 1966), South African cricketer
- Piet Cronjé (1836–1911), South African general in the Anglo-Boer wars
- Piet Dankert (1934–2003), Dutch politician and President of the European Parliament (1982–1984)
- Piet de Boer (1919–1984), Dutch footballer
- Piet de Jong (1915–2016), Prime Minister of the Netherlands (1967–1971)
- Piet Hein Donner (born 1948), Dutch politician and cabinet minister
- Piet Hartman (1922–2021), Dutch crystallographer
- Piet Pieterszoon Hein (1577–1629), Dutch naval officer
- Piet Hein (scientist) (1905–1996), Danish scientist, mathematician, inventor, designer, author and poet
- Piet Hoekstra (born 1947), Dutch cyclist
- Piet Huyg (1951–2019), Dutch footballer
- Piet Joubert (1834–1900), Commandant-General of the South African Republic from 1880 to 1900
- Piet Kee (1927–2018), Dutch organist and composer
- Piet Keizer (1943–2017), Dutch footballer
- Piet Kleine (born 1951), Dutch speed skater, Olympic gold and silver medalist
- Piet Koornhof (1925–2007), South African politician and cabinet minister
- Piet Kramer (1881–1961), Dutch architect
- Piet Kruiver (1938–1989), Dutch footballer
- Piet Kuiper (1934–2017), Dutch botanist
- Piet Leidreiter (born 1965), German politician
- Piet Meiring, South African theologian
- Piet Mondrian (1872–1944), Dutch painter
- Piet Retief (1780–1838), Boer leader
- Piet Roozenburg (1924–2003), world draughts champion (1948–1954)
- Piet Schrijvers (1946–2022), Dutch football goalkeeper
- Piet Uys (1797–1838), Boer leader
- Piet de Visser (football manager) (born 1934), Dutch football manager
- Piet de Visser (politician) (1931–2012), Dutch politician
- Piet de Wit (born 1946), Dutch cyclist
- Piet de Wolf (1921–2013), Dutch footballer

== See also ==
- Zwarte Piet ("Black Pete"), the companion of Saint Nicholas in the folklore of the Low Countries
