= Pitar (disambiguation) =

Pitar may refer to:

- Pitar, a bivalve genus
- Pitar (rank), a historical Romanian rank for a bread supplier
- Pitar, the nickname for supporters of FK Sarajevo

== See also ==
- Pieter Dutch male given name
