= Petrus =

Petrus may refer to:

== People ==
- Petrus (given name)
- Petrus (surname)
- Petrus Borel, pen name of Joseph-Pierre Borel d'Hauterive (1809–1859), French Romantic writer
- Petrus Brovka, pen name of Pyotr Ustinovich Brovka (1905–1980), Soviet Belarusian poet

== Other uses ==
- Château Pétrus, a Pomerol Bordeaux wine producer
- Petrus (fish), a genus of ray-finned fish
- Petrus (beer), a brand of beer
- Pétrus (restaurant), London
- Pétrus (film), a 1946 French comedy film
- Petrus, a band with Ruthann Friedman that performed in 1968 in the San Francisco area

== See also ==
- Petrus killings, a series of executions in Indonesia between 1983 and 1985
- Petrus method, a speedcubing method
