= Meiring =

Meiring is a surname. Notable people with the surname include:

- Alton Meiring (1976–2024), South African football player
- Georg Meiring (1939–2024), South African military commander
- Lin Meiring (1933–2022), South African swimmer
- Piet Meiring, South African theologian
- Sheila Meiring Fugard (born 1932), British-born South African short story writer
- Steven Meiring (born 1984), South African rugby union player

== See also ==
- Meyrink
