= Mount Saint Peter =

Hill in Belgium

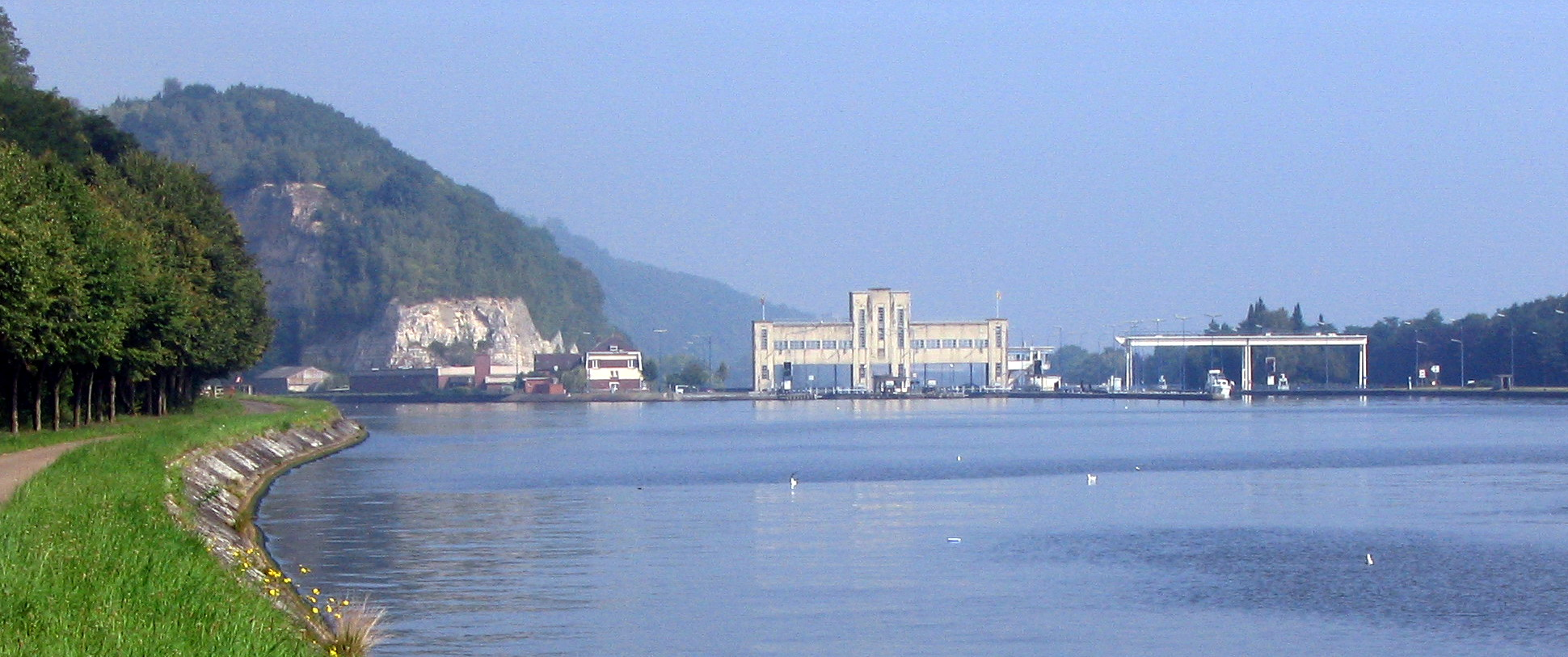
- View of Mount Saint Peter and the Albert Canal near the locks of Lanaye

Highest point
- Elevation: 171 m (561 ft)
- Parent peak: Caestert Plateau (107 m)
- Coordinates: 50°48′52″N 05°41′06″E

Geography
- Location within Benelux
- Location: Netherlands / Belgium

Mount Saint Peter (French: Montagne Saint-Pierre; Dutch: Sint-Pietersberg), also referred to as Caestert Plateau, is the northern part of a plateau running north to south between the valleys of the river Geer to the west, and the Meuse to the east. The plateau runs from Maastricht in the Netherlands, through Riemst in Belgian Limburg almost to the city of Liège in Belgium, thus defining the topography of this border area between Flanders, Wallonia and the Netherlands. The name of the hill, as well as the nearby village and church of Sint Pieter and the fortress of Sint Pieter, refers to Saint Peter, one of the Twelve Apostles.

== Principal characteristics ==
The plateau, of which Mount Saint Peter is part, is bounded on the east by the Meuse river (Dutch: Maas) and on the west by the Geer (Jeker). Since the 1930s, the Albert Canal divides the hill in two sections. Near the small Liège Province village of Lanaye (Dutch: Ternaaien), the canal cuts through the ridge over a length of 1,300 metres (4,300 ft) and 65 metres (213 ft) deep. The Lanaye locks at the eastern end of the cut permit boats to pass from the upper Meuse and the Albert Canal to the lower Meuse and Rhine basin. To the east of these locks the Meuse has altered its course, creating backwaters and old channels.

Mount Saint Peter's limestone composition, its deposits of flint nodules and its geographic position make it a remarkable place. The locale has been mined for flint since Neolithic times. The network of mining tunnels extended 200 kilometres (120 mi) by the 19th century but was severely shortened in the 20th century by surface mining. These days, Mount Saint Peter is considered an important nature reserve, as well as an area for recreation and tourism.

== History ==
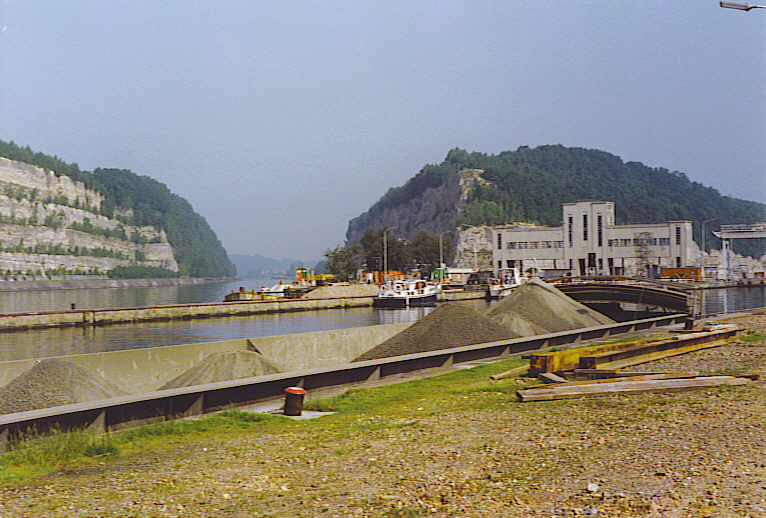
Section of Caestert Plateau where the Albert Canal can be seen cutting through the ridge

In the part of Mount Saint Peter that is in the Flemish municipality of Riemst, archaeological evidence of an Iron Age fortress has been found. The fortress is one of the strongest contenders for being identified as the fortress Atuatuca of the Eburones, which played an important role in Julius Caesar's commentaries on his wars in Gaul. Dendrochronological evidence was once thought to count against this proposal, but more recent review of the evidence has reinvigorated the idea.

During the Middle Ages several castles were built on the hill, of which various ruins remain. The hill was favoured by attackers during the various sieges of Maastricht, most notably by Louis XIV of France in the Siege of Maastricht (1673). As a result of this, the fortress Sint-Pieter was built on the northern edge.

Around 1765 the skull of a Mosasaurus was discovered here in a limestone quarry, one of the first recognised reptile fossils, which was later acquired by the Teylers Museum in Haarlem. A more famous Mosasaurus fossil was found between 1770 and 1774 but was confiscated by the French in 1794 and is now in the Muséum national d'Histoire naturelle in Paris. Later dinosaur remains were discovered here as well, belonging to Betasuchus and Orthomerus, as well as turtles and fossils of smaller creatures of the sea.

From 1930 through 1939 the Albert Canal was constructed, cutting through parts of Mount Saint Peter. The first ships went through in 1940. The hill's strategic location made it the site of Fort Eben-Emael (1931–35), a major artillery defence point in the Belgian defences against any invading forces coming from Nazi Germany. At the opening of the war, the entire installation was taken quickly by a relatively small number of German paratroopers. During World War II, the hill's managed to later serve as a hideout for the art collection of the Dutch Mauritshuis art museum until the liberation of the Netherlands in May 1945.

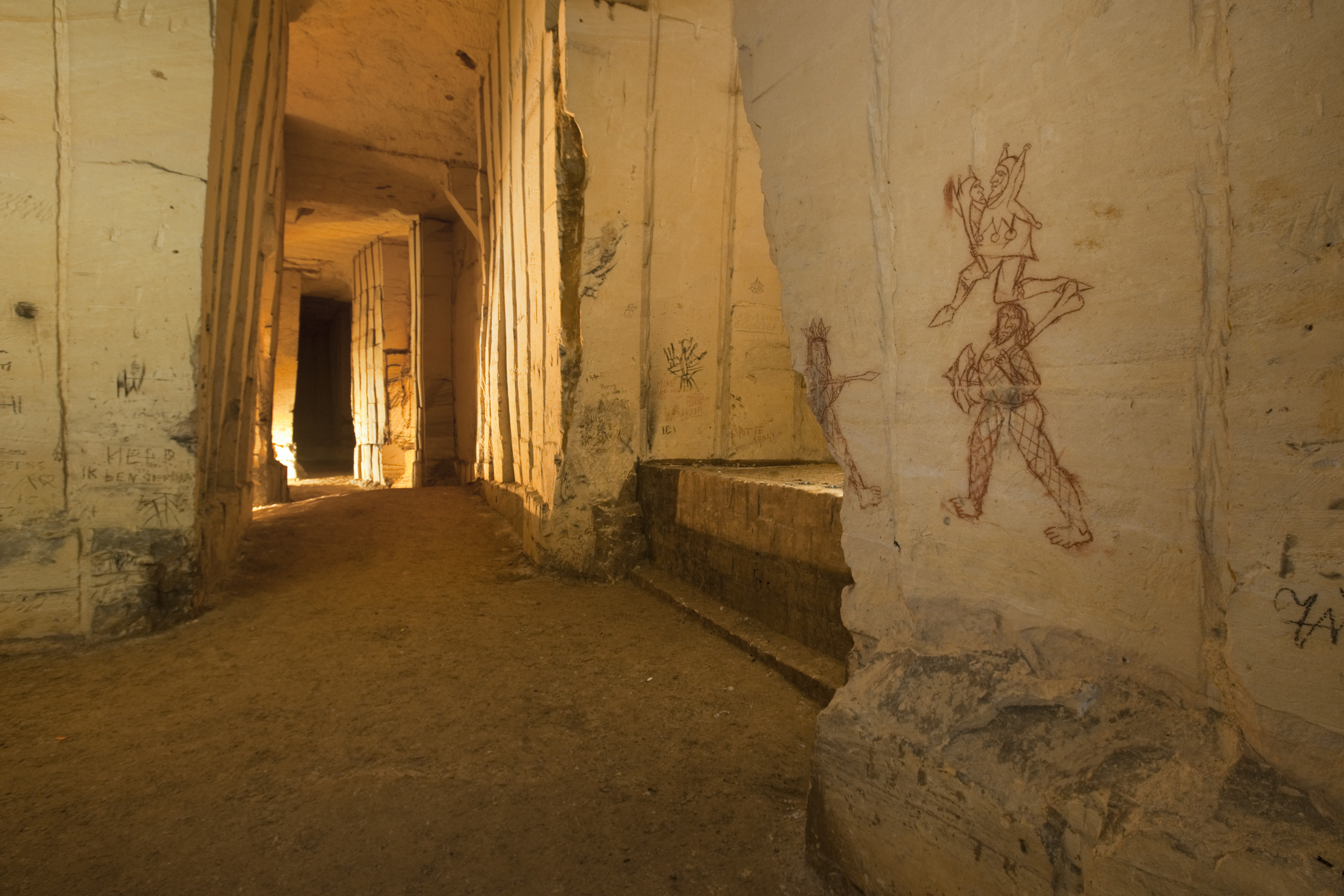
Late Medieval graffiti in a quarry

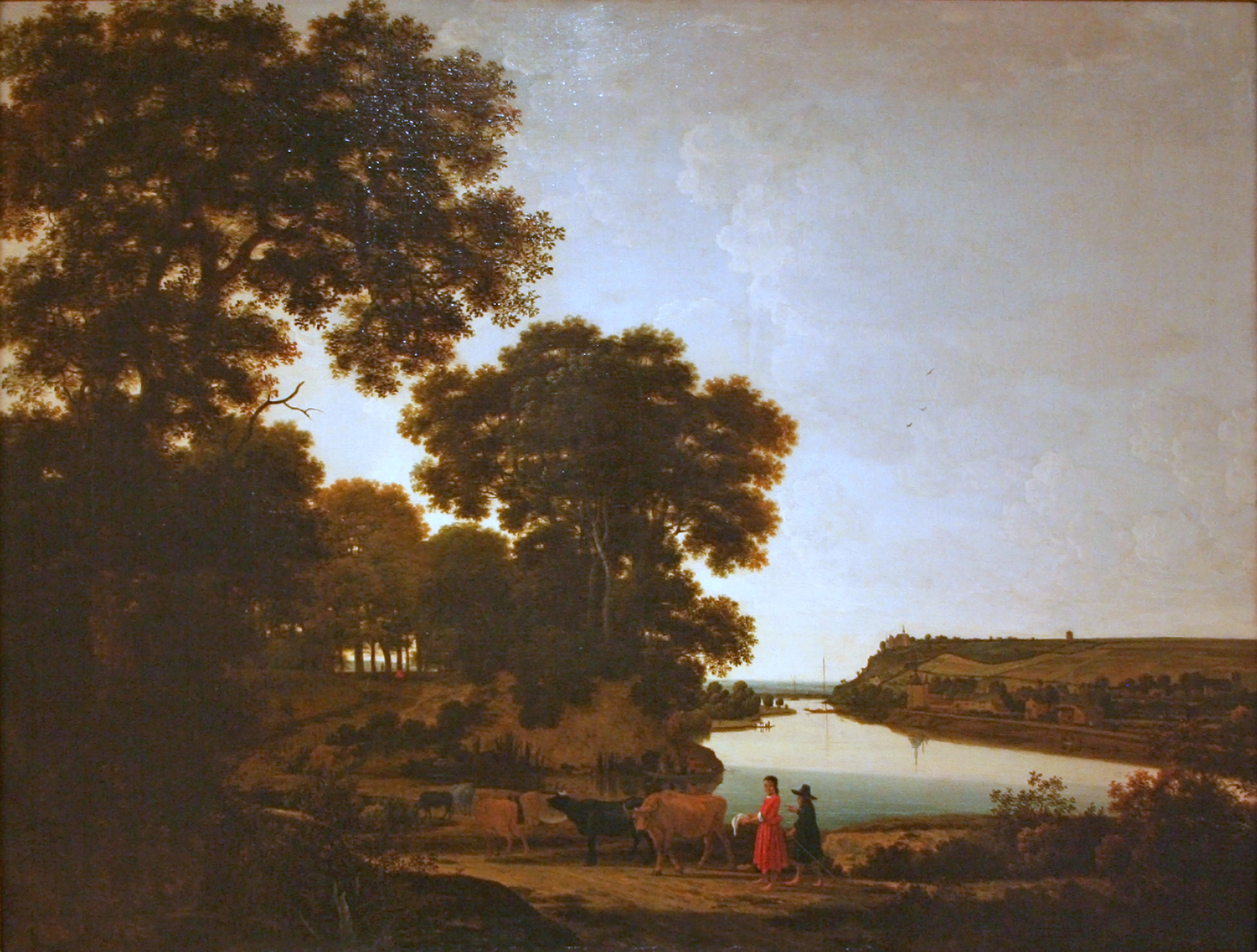
Painting by Joris van der Haagen (17th century)

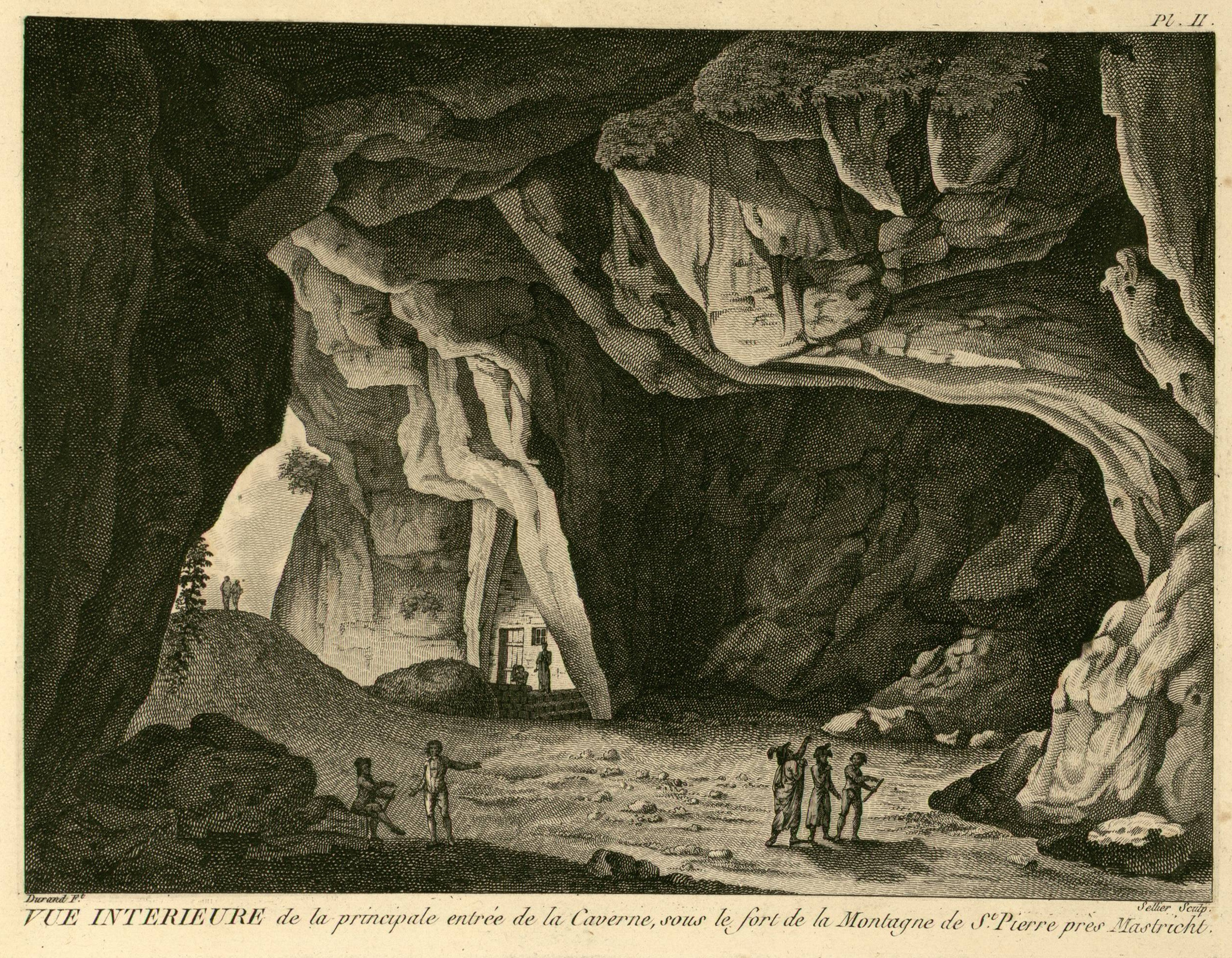
Limestone quarries in 1799

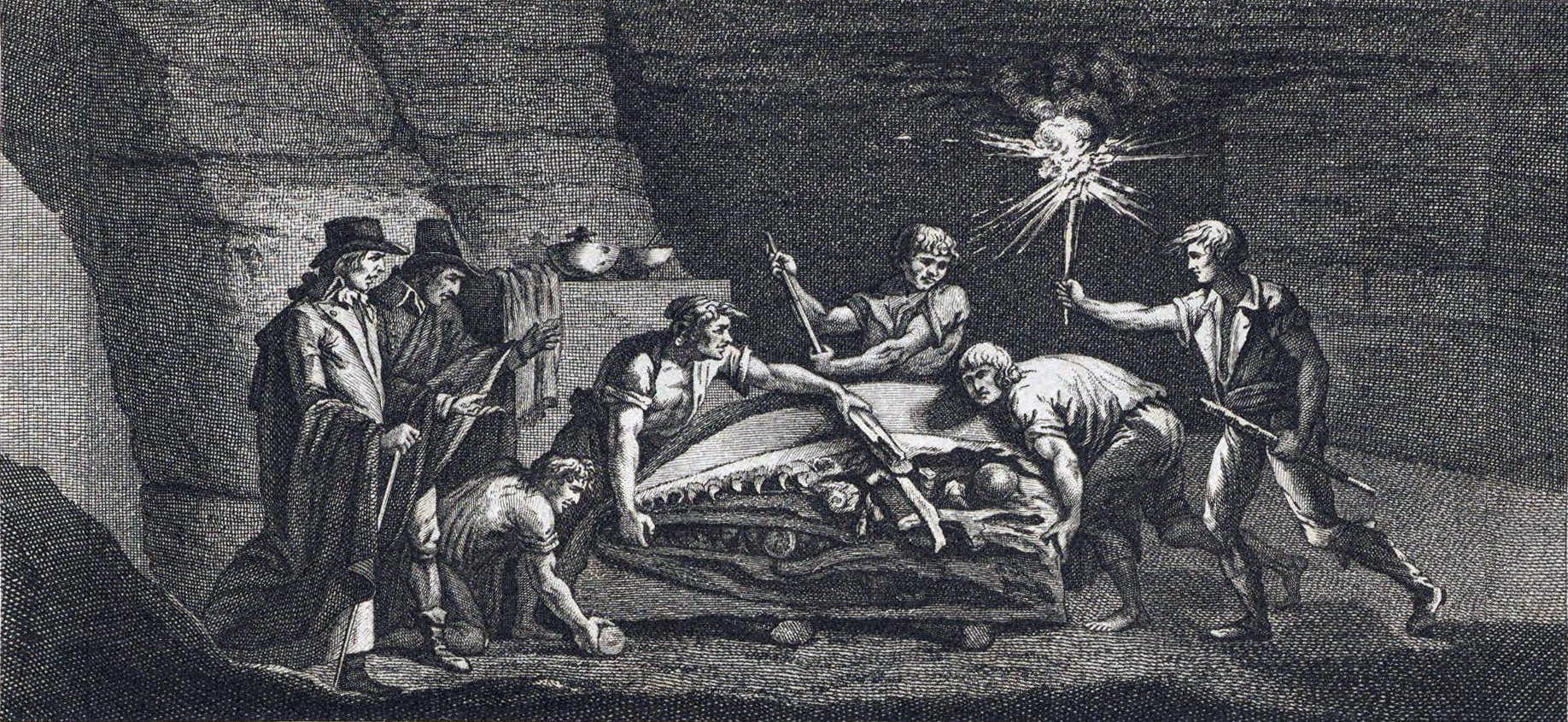
Discovery of the Mosasaurus

== Geology and mining activities ==
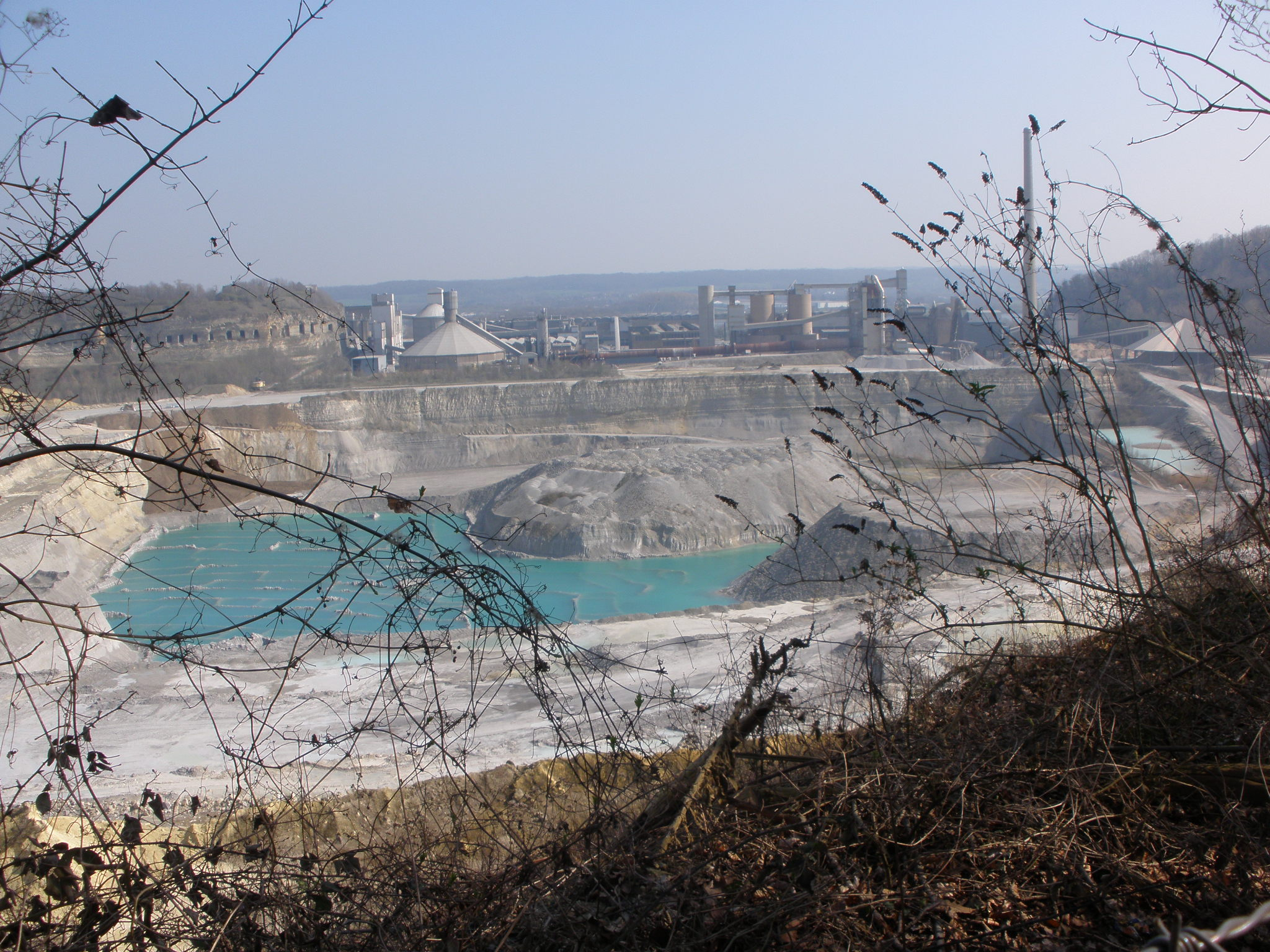
ENCI quarry and factories

At Mount Saint Peter the rivers Geer and Meuse have cut into the limestone plateau known in the east as the Herve plateau and in the west as Hesbaye. The succeeding geologic layers include loess, gravel, quartz sand and chalky limestone of the Maastricht Formation with inclusions of flint. The chalk deposits contain numerous fossils of sea urchins, clams and belemnites.

Humans have used the site since the Lower Paleolithic period. The area around Spiennes is known for its flint mines. Limestone has been quarried in the area for building stone and fertilizer for many centuries. Several of Maastricht's medieval churches were built from local stone, incorrectly referred to as mergel (marl). The quarrying of limestone has created a vast network of subterranean corridors, also incorrectly referred to as grotten (caves). Although vast sections of these "caves" have now disappeared through surface mining, other sections are well-preserved. Guided tours of these limestone quarries, some with ancient inscriptions, drawings and other works of art, constitute one of Maastricht's main tourist attractions.

In modern times limestone from Mount Saint Peter continues to be quarried in surface mines, mainly for portland cement production. Abandoned quarries in the Belgian part of the hill are used to dispose of ashes from municipal waste incinerators. A large quarry and cement factory operated by ENCI exists since 1921 in the Dutch part of the hill. The quarrying of limestone in a protected nature area was controversial for many years but for economic reasons ENCI was able to extract most of the mount's limestone, creating a vast area of connected quarries. In 2010 it was decided that by 2018 the quarry will close down. Various plans for redevelopment of both the quarry and the factory site have been presented in recent years. Parts of the quarry that were abandoned years ago have been taken over by nature once again.

== Ecology ==
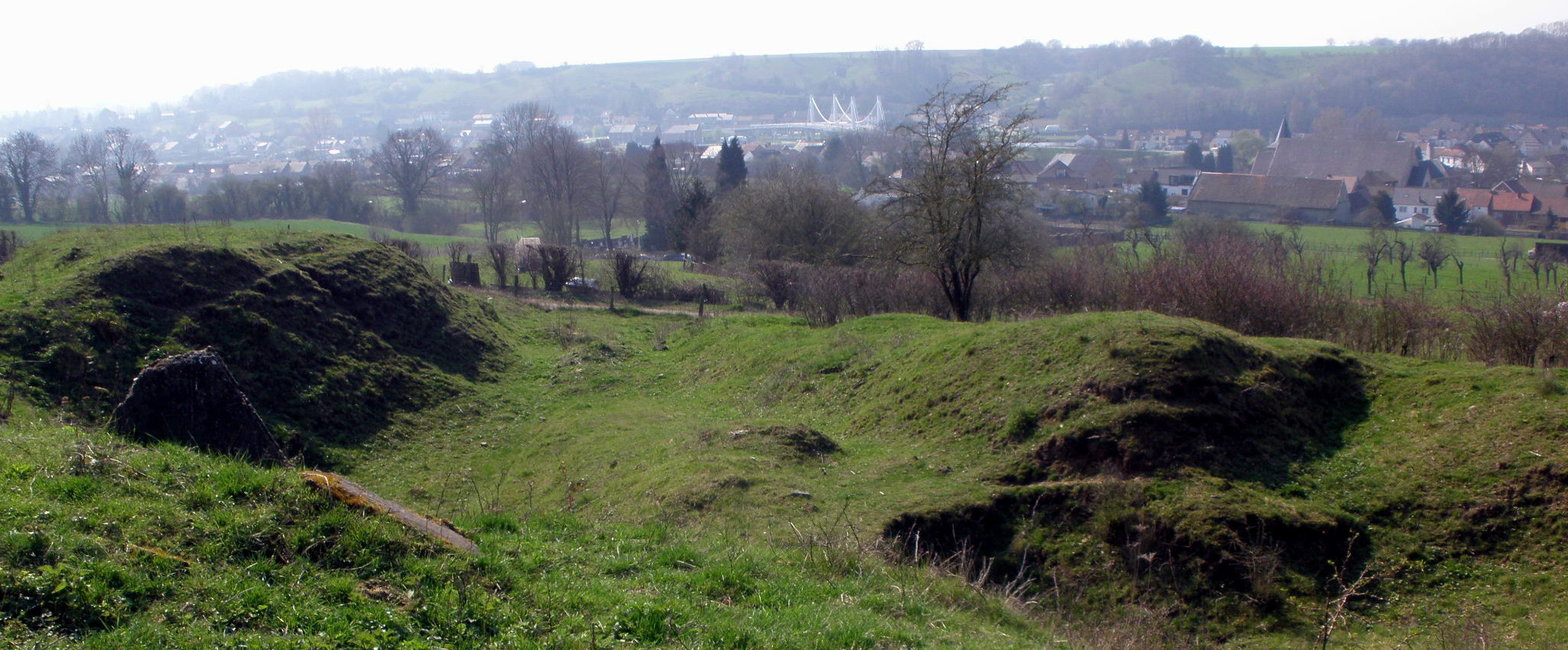
View from the mount of the village of Kanne

Mount Saint Peter is a Natura 2000 protection area. Because of its limestone soil, the hill is exceptional in its botanical variety. It is the northern limit for a number of species of orchids due to its favorable microclimate. Some of the orchids found there include: Aceras anthropophorum, Ophrys apifera, Ophrys insectifera, Orchis militaris, Orchis purpurea and Platanthera bifolia. An abandoned part of the ENCI quarry has become in recent years the breeding ground of the Eurasian eagle-owl, locally known as oehoe (pronounced: uhu). Mount Saint Peter supports the richest environment for bats in Benelux, as well as the richest environment for orchids in Benelux.

The Dutch part of the plateau is largely owned by the Dutch society for preservation of nature monuments Natuurmonumenten. A sheep herd is used to keep vegetation open in certain areas.

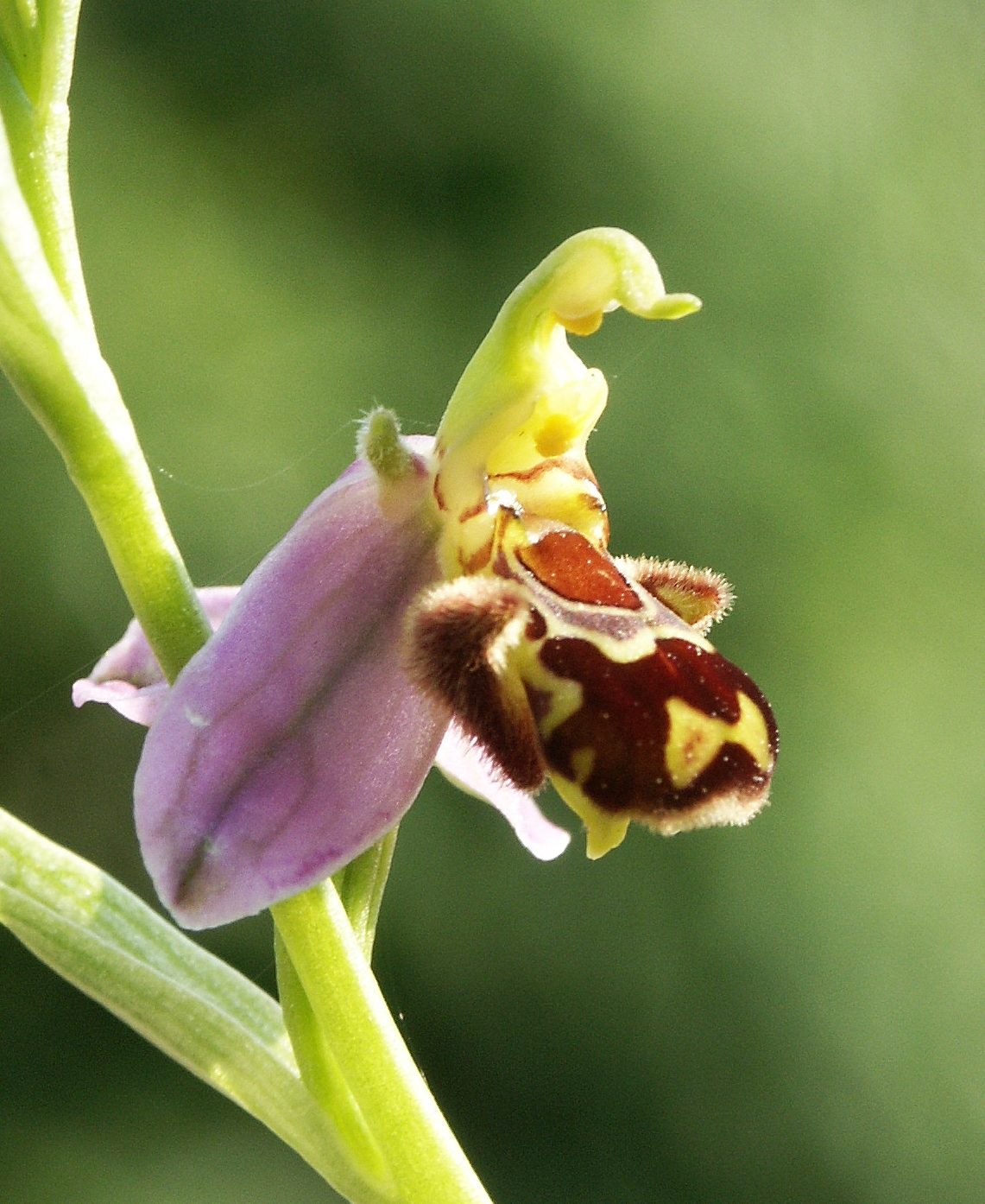
Orchid Ophrys apifera

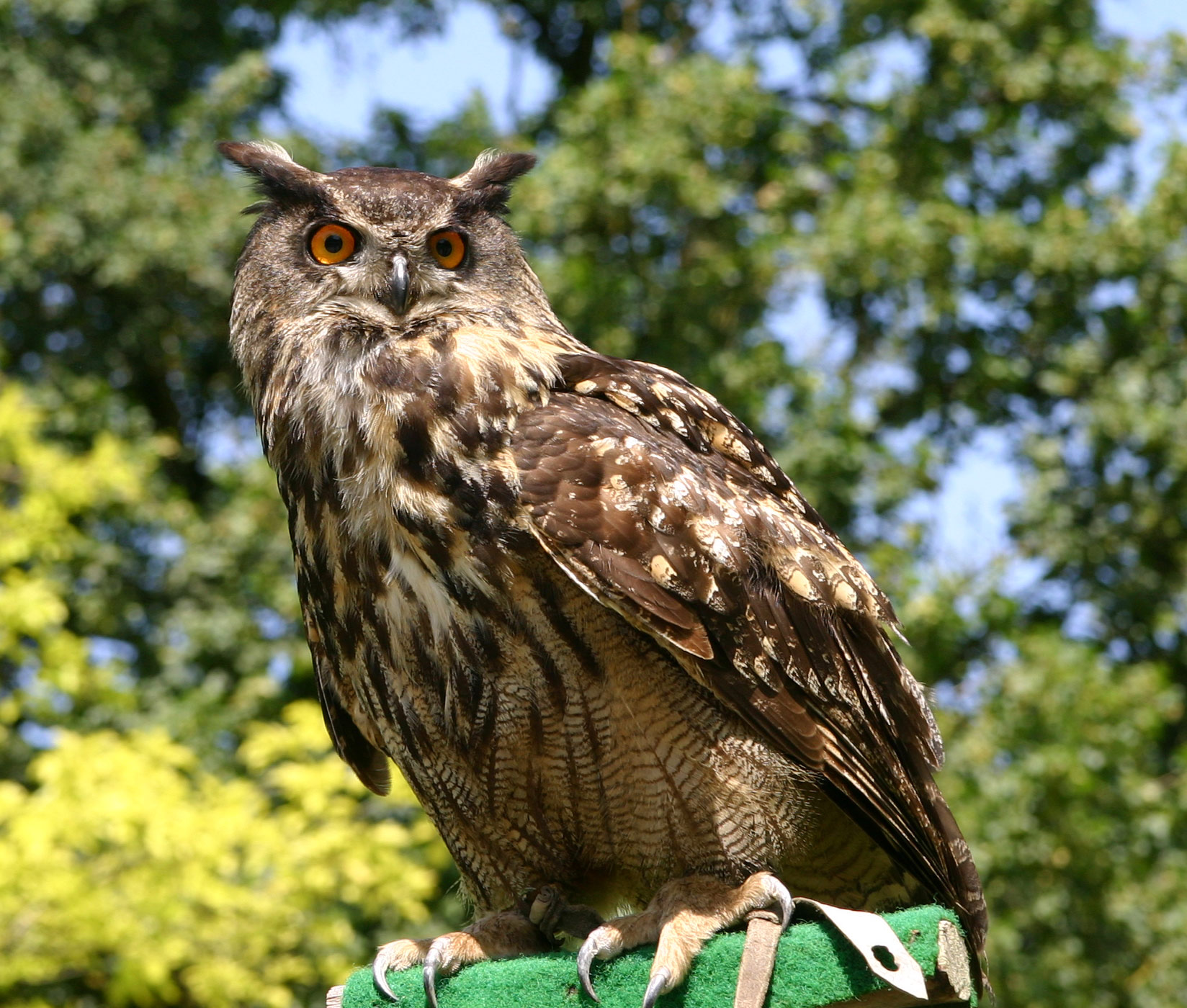
Eurasian eagle-owl

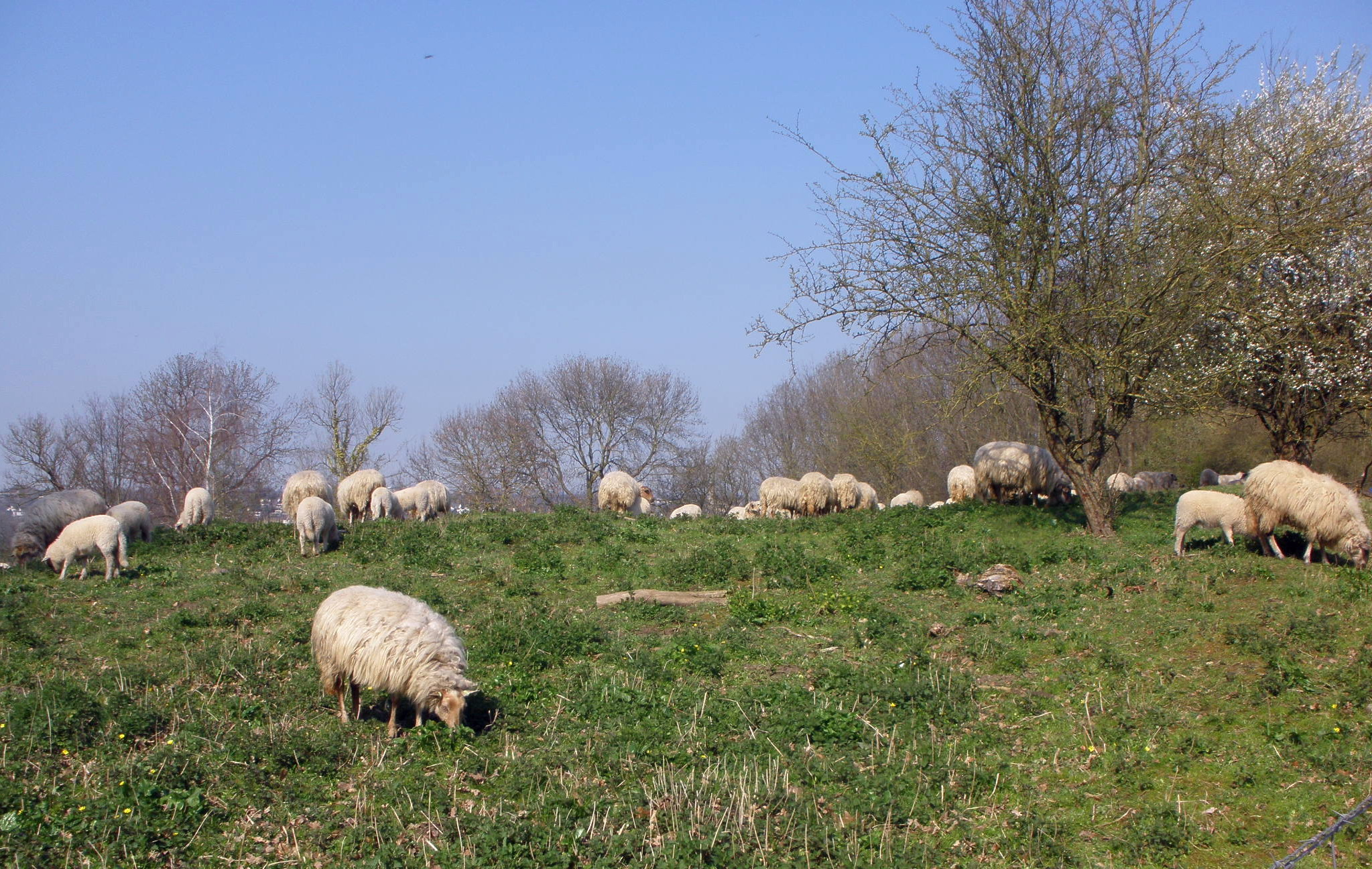
Sheep flock on the mount

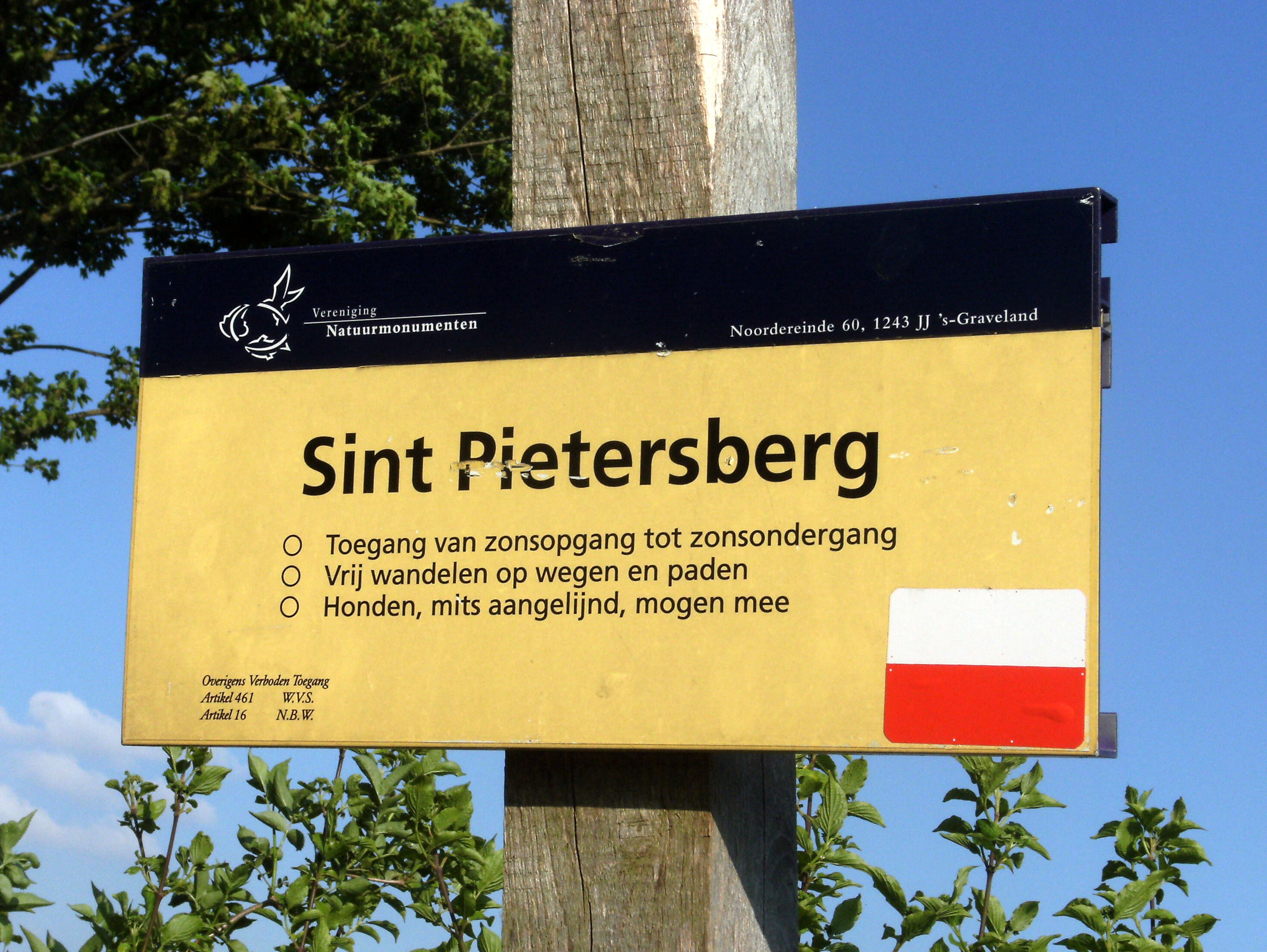
Sign Natuurmonumenten

== Listed buildings ==
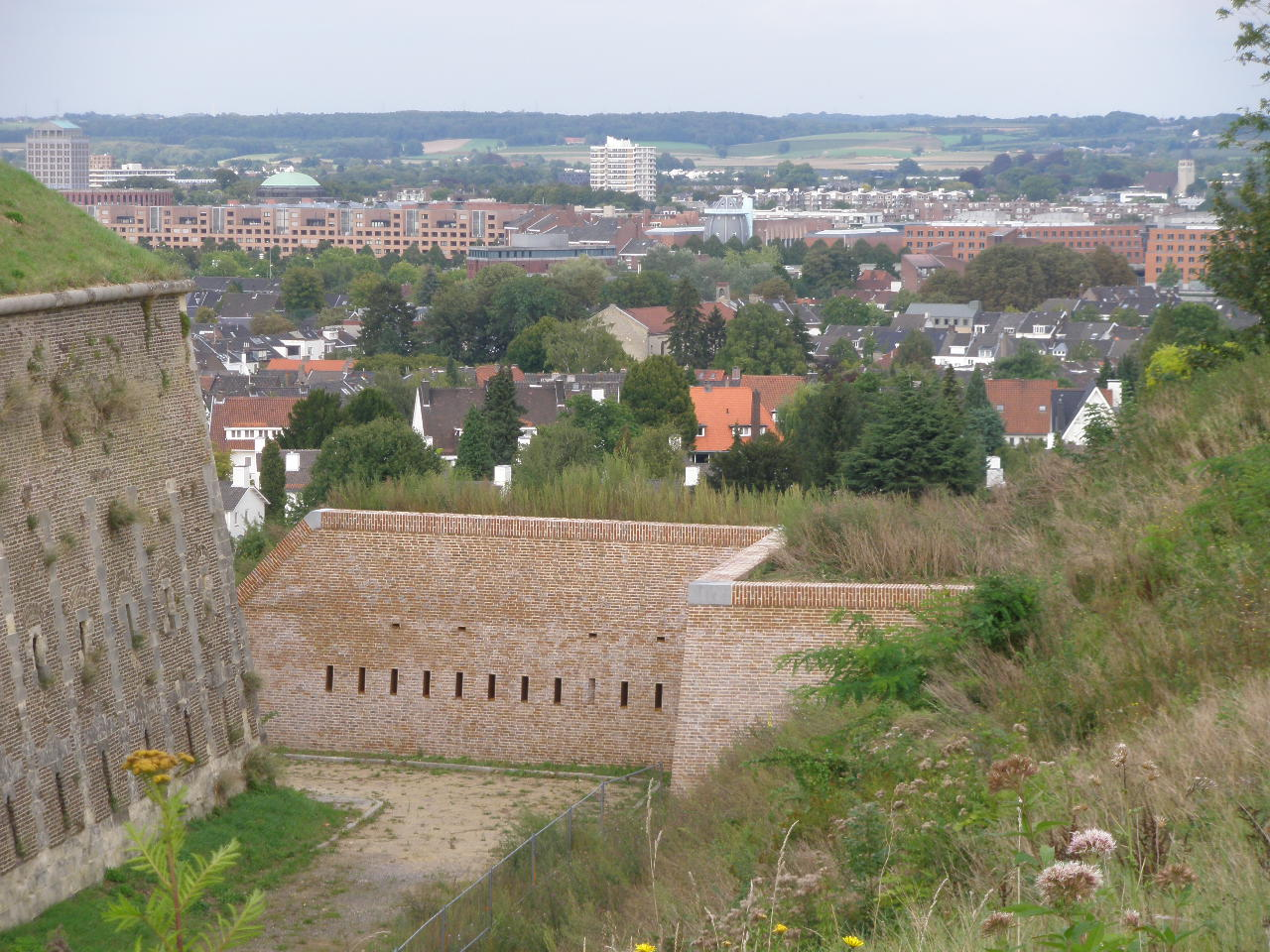
View of Maastricht from fortress Sint-Pieter

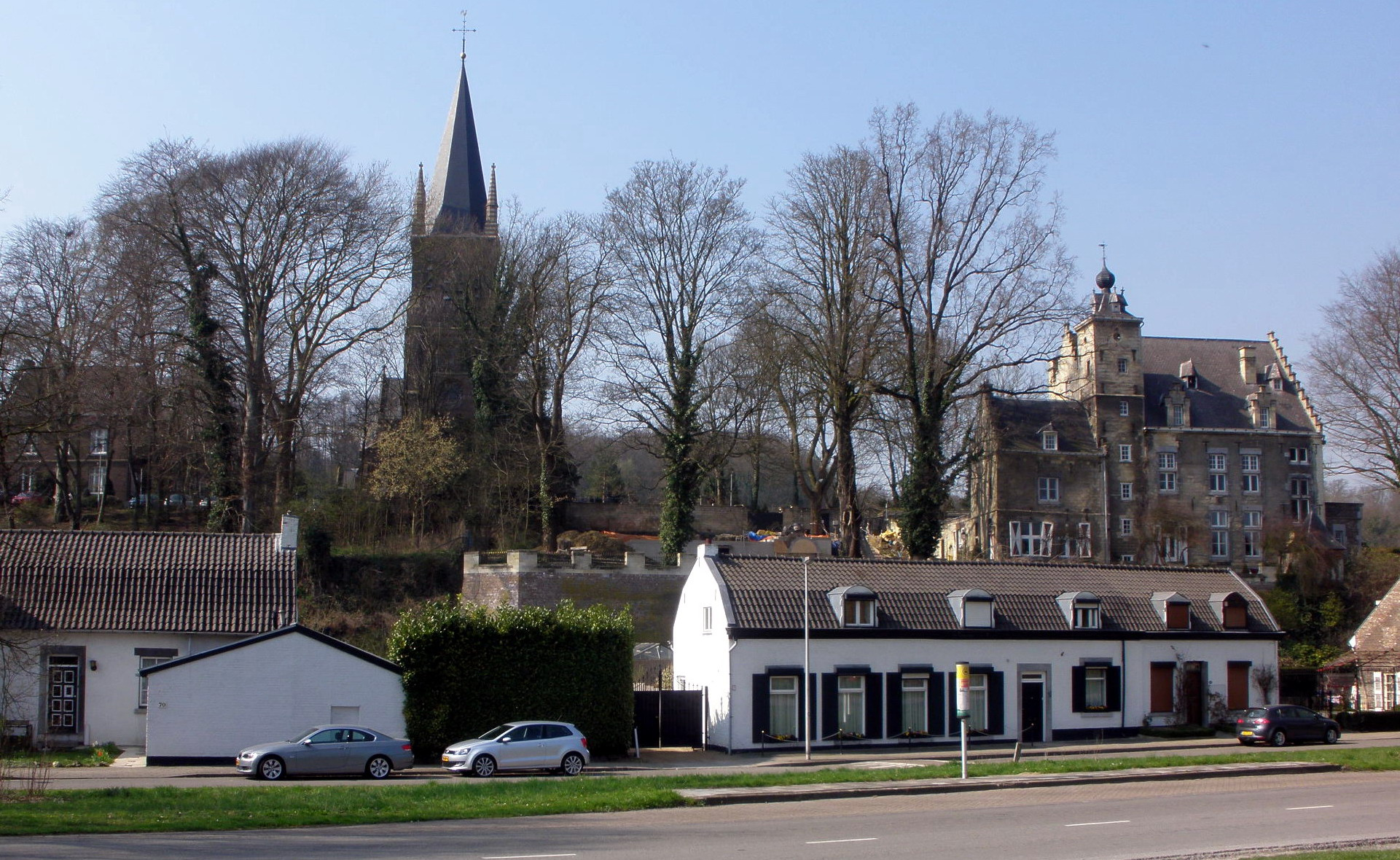
The village of Sint Pieter

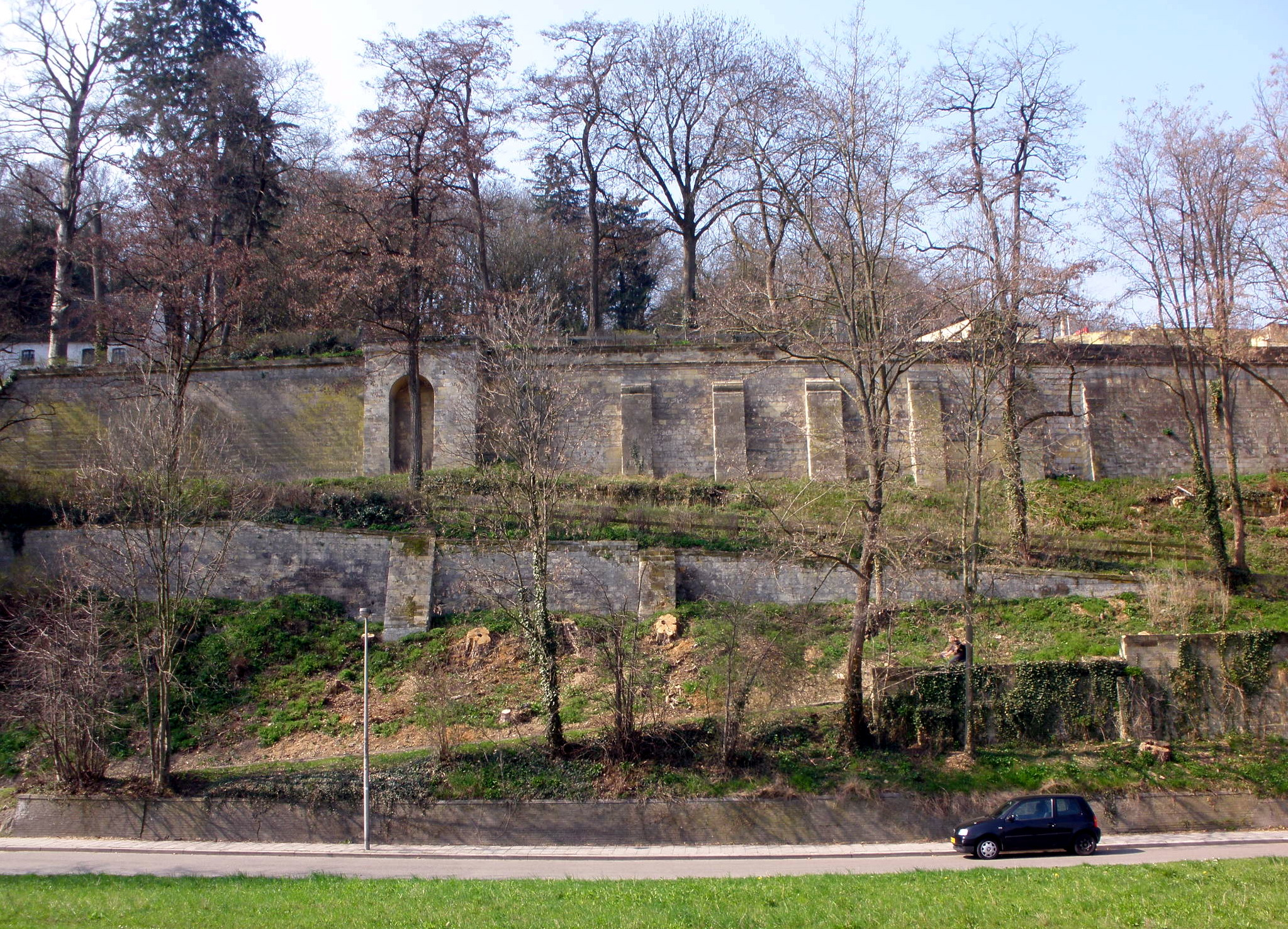
Winding road near Slavante

=== Castles and farmsteads ===
On the western part of the mount remains of the motte-and-bailey castle De Tombe can be detected in the landscape. On the northeastern section, now overlooking the ENCI quarry as well as the river Meuse, is the farmstead Lichtenberg, largely dating from the 18th century but which includes an 11th-century keep. Further south, in the Walloon municipality of Visé, is another ruined castle overlooking the Meuse, Caestert, of which only some of the farm buildings remain. Well-preserved is the 16th-century house De Torentjes ("The little towers"), at the bottom of the hill in the village of Sint Pieter.

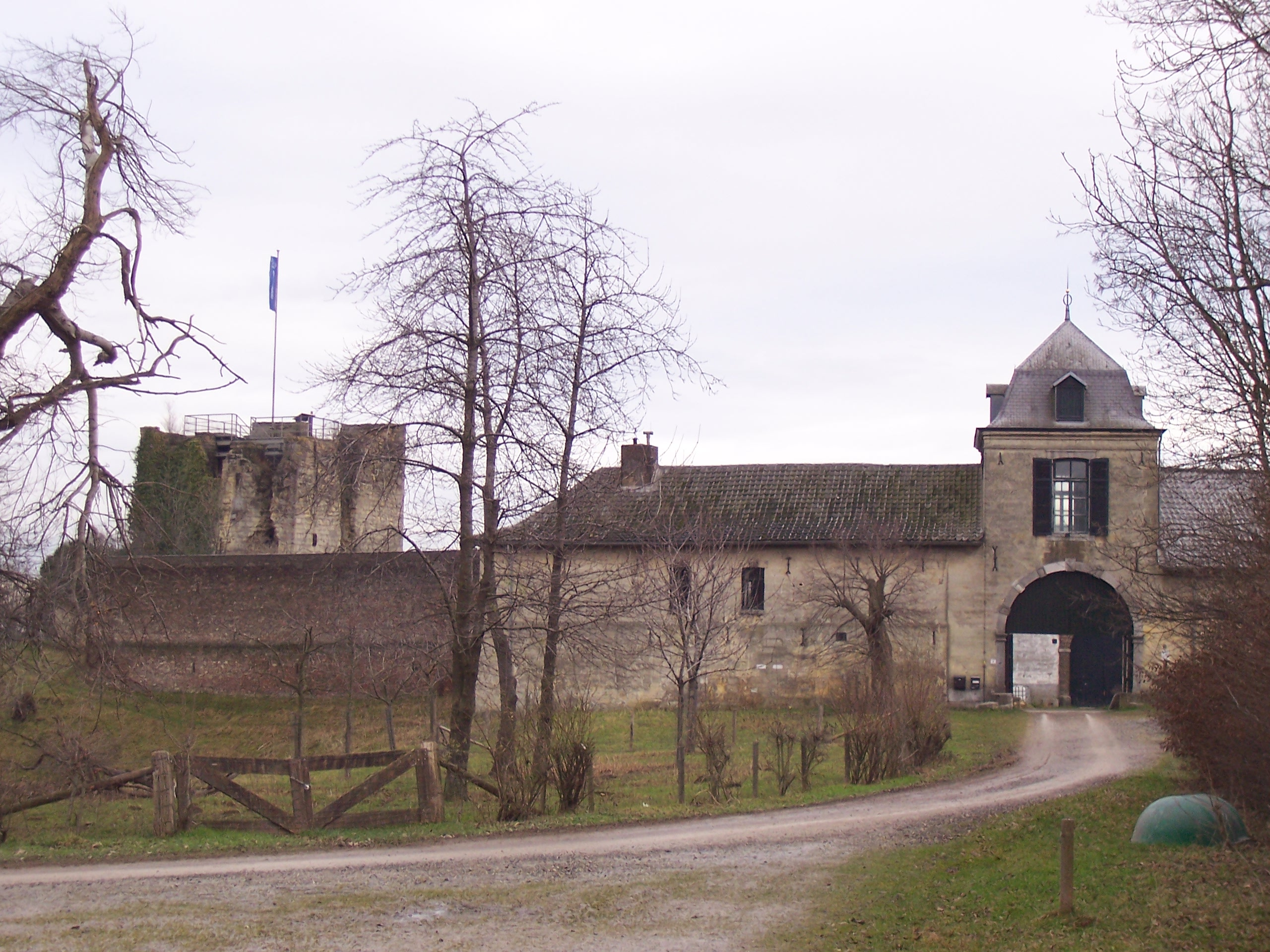
Castle ruins Lichtenberg

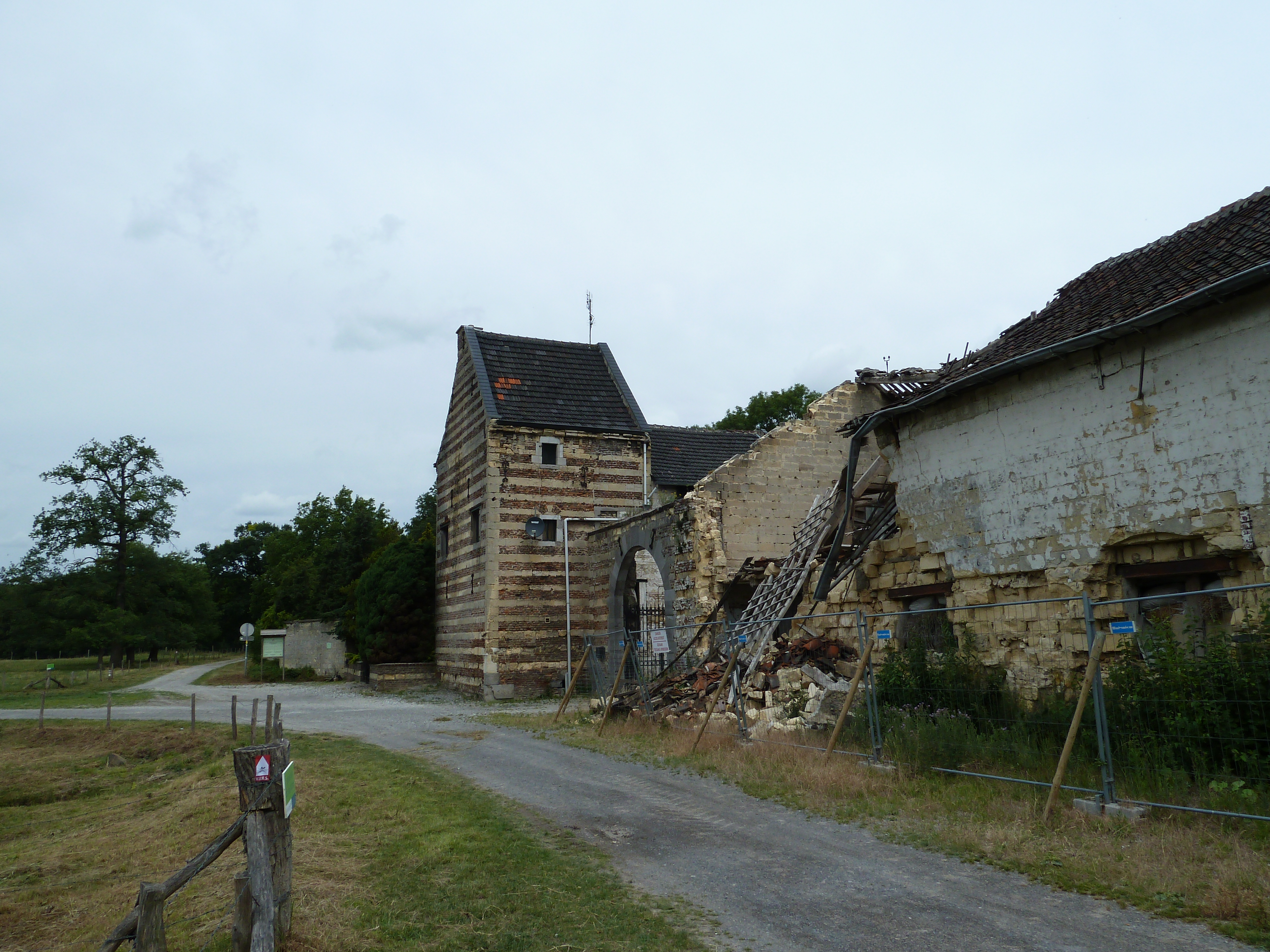
Remains of Caestert

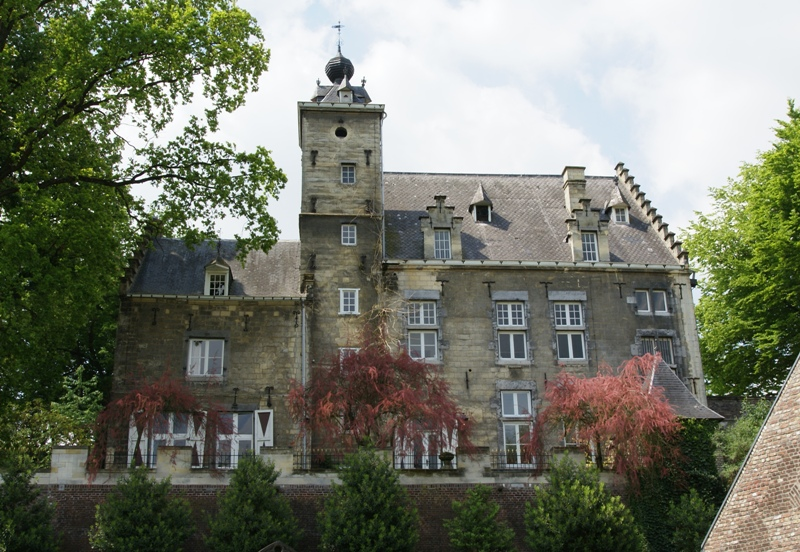
House De Torentjes

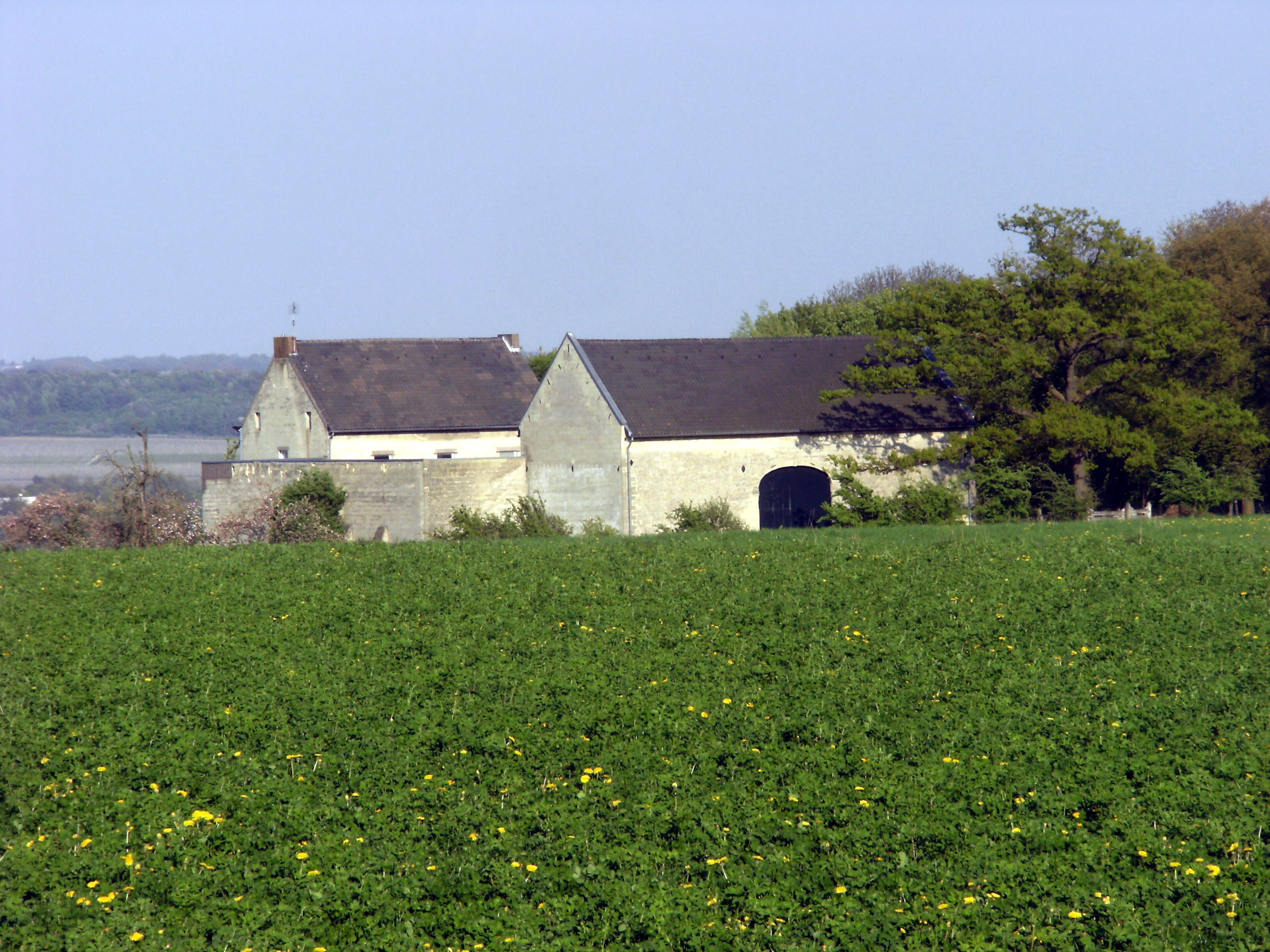
Farmstead Zonneberg

=== Other buildings ===
The imposing fortress Sint-Pieter on the northern edge of the hill overlooking the city of Maastricht was built in 1702 as part of the defense works of the heavily fortified city of Maastricht. The fortress was recently restored to reflect its original state. The old village of Sint Pieter was part of the Prince-Bishopric of Liège until 1794. The medieval church was replaced in the 19th century by the present Gothic Revival building by architect Jules Kayser. South of the village remnants of the 17th-century Franciscan Slavante Monastery can be seen, including a small baroque chapel dedicated to Saint Anthony. Nearby, an elegant pavilion, 'Casino' Slavante, was built in 1846 by a Maastricht military gentlemen's club. A sinister reminder of World War II is the fortress Eben-Emael, constructed in 1931–35 to protect the Belgian border near the Albert Canal.

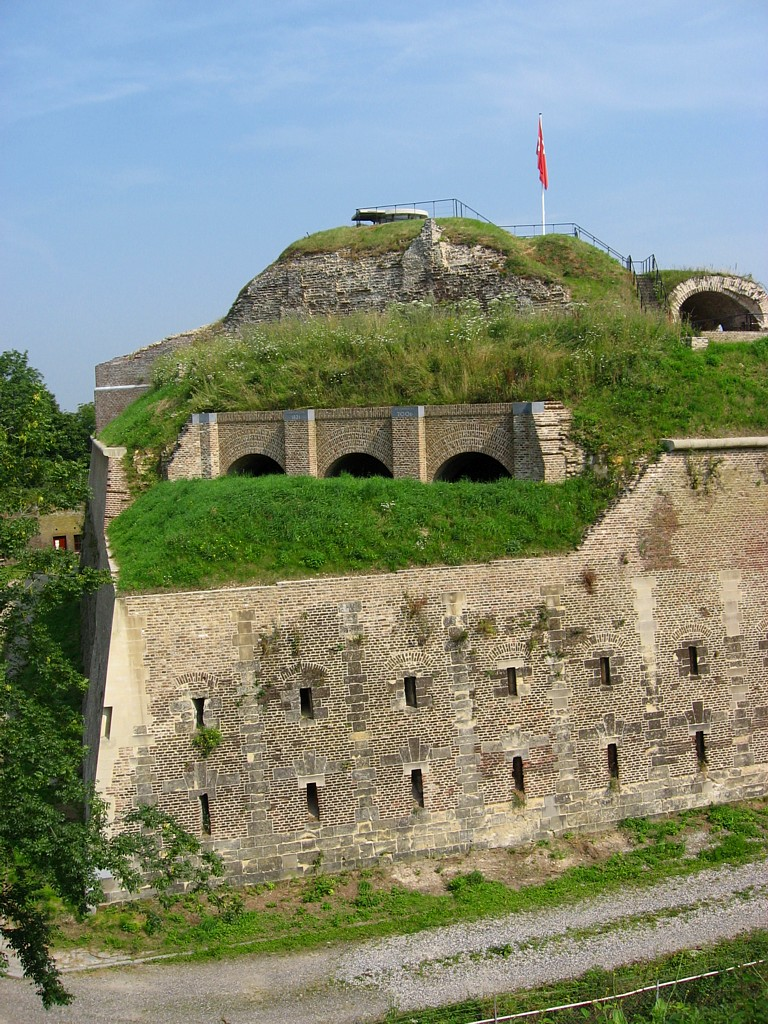
Fortress Sint-Pieter

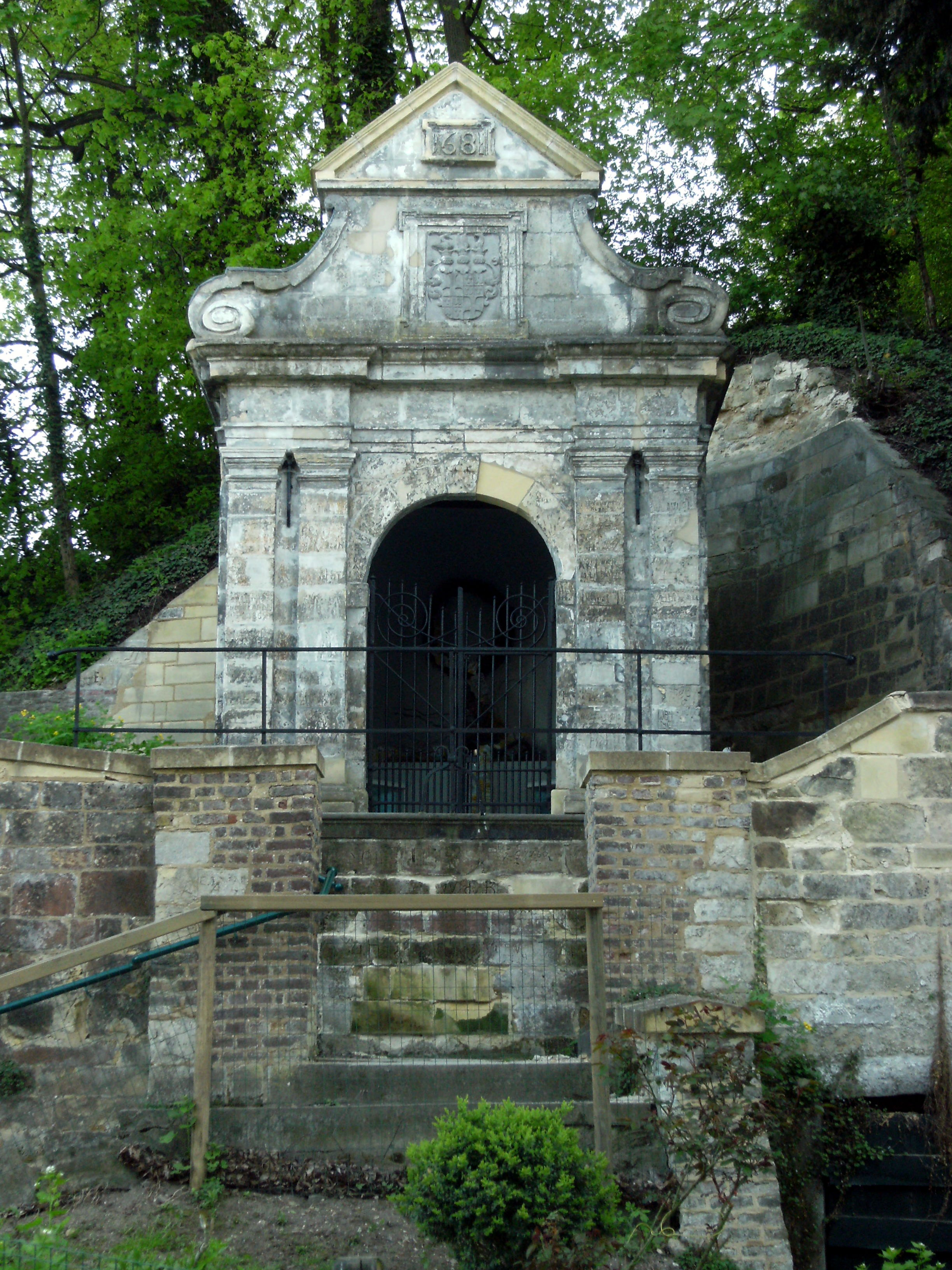
Saint Anthony's Chapel

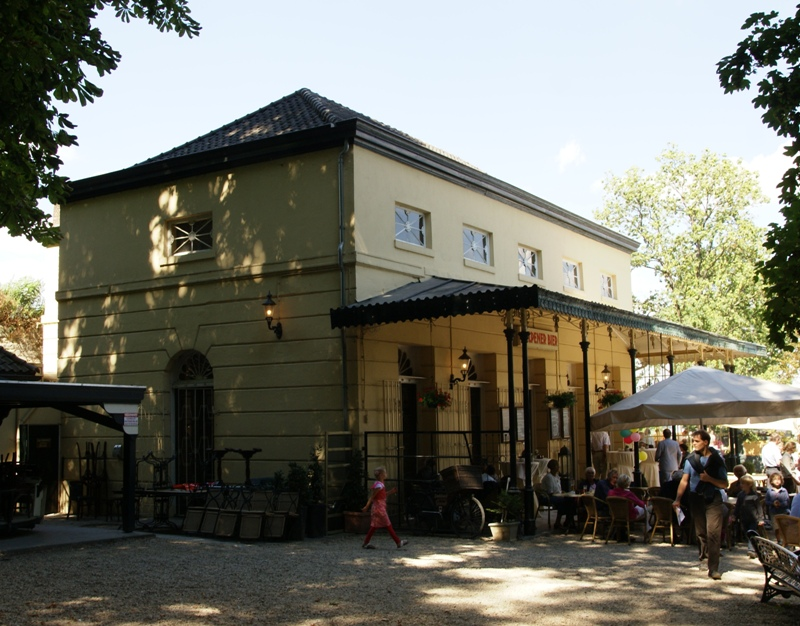
Casino Slavante

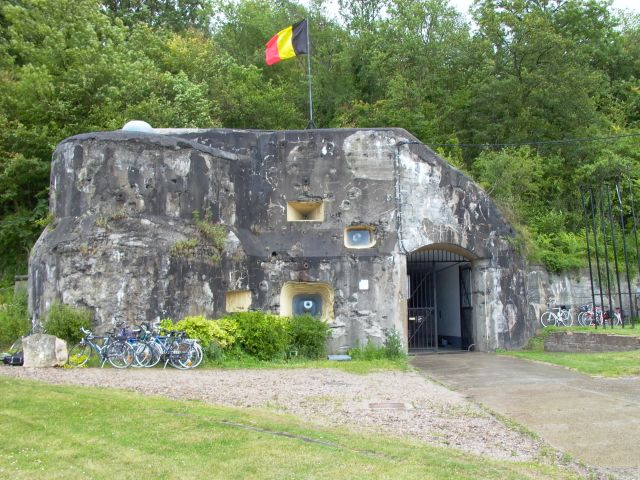
Fortress Eben-Emael
