= Meyrink =

Meyrink, Meyerink, Meijerink, Meijering(h), and Meyerinck, are Germanic surnames. Most are toponymic surnames of Low Saxon origin, meaning "from the estate of the meier". People with a form of this surname include:

- Adriana Admiraal-Meijerink (1893–1992), Dutch fencer
- Albert Meijeringh (1645–1714), Dutch landscape painter
- Bianca Meyerink (born 1992), German volleyball player
- Chiel Meijering (born 1954), Dutch composer
- Gustav Meyrink, pseudonym of Gustav Meyer (1868 - 1932), Austrian author
- Hubert von Meyerinck (1896–1971), German actor
- Michelle Meyrink (1962-), Canadian actress
- Victoria Paige Meyerink (born 1960), American actress
- Martin Meijerink (born 1968), Dutch Cyber Security specialist

Fictional characters:

- Luise Meyrink, fictional character in the video game series The King of Fighters

== See also ==
- Meyer (surname)
- Meijer (surname)
- Meiring, a surname
