= ENCI =

Dutch cement company

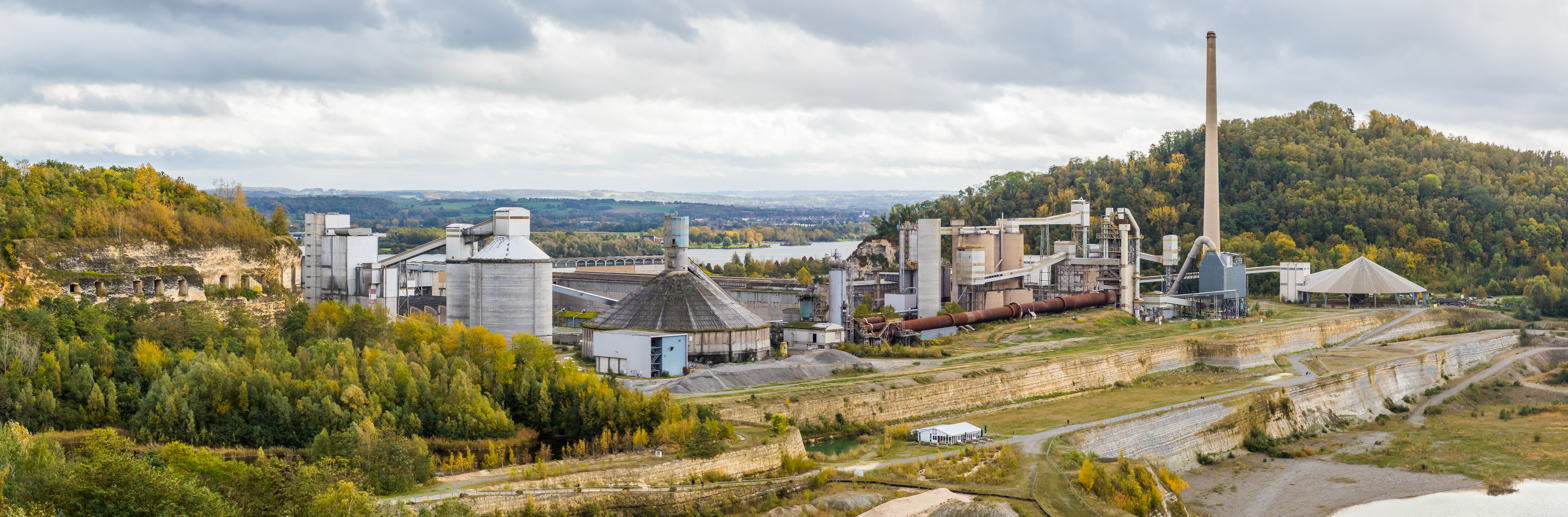
Factory, 2023

ENCI (Eerste Nederlandse Cement Industrie - First Dutch Cement Industry) is a Dutch company based in Maastricht, Rotterdam and IJmuiden. Their core business activity used to consist of the digging of marl out of St Pietersberg, which they used to make cement. The company has been around since 1924, with major locations being in Maastricht and Sint-Pietersberg. The Maastricht location was closed in 2020, along with the cement production.

A pair of Eurasian eagle-owls have been nesting at the ENCI quarry since 2001, making the quarry one of the most well-known nesting sites for the bird in Western Europe.

== History ==
In 1924, the First Dutch Cement Industry was founded in Maastricht, the cradle of the current company. In 1926, the company obtained an exploitation concession from the Dutch government for the extraction of Limburg marl on the Sint-Pietersberg, part of the Plateau van Caestert, just south of Maastricht.

As early as 1923, Herman de Ronde made the first sketches for the new factory on the Lage Kanaaldijk. Four years later, the so-called 'Peutzhal' was created, now AINSI, designed by Frits Peutz, who collaborated with De Ronde during this period, and the Dutch Portland cement factory in Vijlen was bought by the ENCI. It would later be closed in 1929.

From its inception, ENCI's shares have been largely owned by the Brussels-based company CBR (Cimenteries et Briquetteries Réunies de Bonne Espérance). This company was acquired in 1993 by the German HeidelbergCement, an internationally operating group that is currently the fourth largest cement producer in the world.

The production location in Maastricht closed in 2020, after marl extraction in the ENCI quarry had been stopped two years earlier.

Despite its name, ENCI was founded by a Belgian-Swiss consortium in 1925 with the first factory starting production in 1928. With the founding of ENCI, the Netherlands were no longer fully dependent on foreign cement. At the turn of the 21st century, ENCI produced 1.6 million tonnes of cement yearly, supplying roughly a quarter of all cement used in the Netherlands from its Maastricht plant.

== Environmental impacts ==
Until about 1970, the ENCI was one of the largest employers in Maastricht. Since the 1970s, criticism of the company has increased because more and more people found the activities of the quarry and the factory harmful to nature and the environment, in particular because of the degradation of the Sint-Pietersberg by excavation, the desiccation of the Jekerdal, which is partly due to the pumping of groundwater by ENCI, and the emission of harmful substances into the air, partly due to the co-firing of waste materials in the clinker kiln.

The limestone in the Sint-Pietersberg is mined in opencast mining, excavating an increasing part of the mountain, causing significant damage to the landscape and the flora and fauna living there. In addition, in 2006 a piece of ENCI forest on the Sint-Pietersberg was felled without ENCI having the required exemption, and in violation of the guidelines that the Ministry of LNV had issued to ENCI.

In addition to the influence of the Albert Canal, ENCI's activities also contribute to the dehydration of the Jekerdal by pumping large quantities of groundwater from the quarry for marl extraction.

=== Air quality ===
In order to save on the use of fossil fuels and to limit the effective emissions of CO_{2}, fuels qualified as waste are co-fired in the clinker kiln. This concerns sludge from sewage treatment plants and sorted material from household waste processing. Residual material that remains after combustion is processed with the clinker. The parties are divided on the question of whether there is "responsible disposal of waste". Local residents complain about the nuisance of stench, dust and noise as a result of the combustion of residual materials. The incineration of this waste also produces additional emissions of, among other things, mercury. ENCI in Maastricht annually emits, among other things, about 70 kg of mercury and 30,000 kg of particulate matter.

=== Protests and renewal of permit ===
Although ENCI BV's excavation permit expired on December 31, 2009, it was extended once more in 2010, until 2018. In that year, the marl extraction on the Sint-Pietersberg was definitively stopped; clinker production was continued until 2019 using the accumulated marl stocks. From 2018, the clinker will be supplied from Belgium ( Antoing ) as the cement mills continue to produce.

With the cessation of marl mining and clinker production in Maastricht, the long-lasting struggle of local residents and environmental activists against the cement company has come to an end for the time being. For decades there have been protests against the further deterioration of the Sint-Pietersberg, in order to prevent more damage to nature and the environment. At the end of 2007, the action group 'Sint-Pietersberg Breathtaking' collected nearly 5000 signatures from opponents of further excavation as a citizens' initiative. ENCI employees subsequently collected more than 12,000 signatures. The Municipality of Maastricht and the Provincial Council of Limburg initially took a dual attitude, with the employment aspect being the deciding factor for many years.

In 1998, ENCI was bought by the Belgian CBR-Group (itself part of HeidelbergCement) and Holcim. Currently, HeidelbergCement is the sole owner. In 2019, HeidelbergCement announced that ENCI's Maastricht plant would be closed.
