= Sint Pieter =

Neighborhood in the Netherlands

Coordinates: 50°50′N 5°41′E

- neighbourhood and former municipality
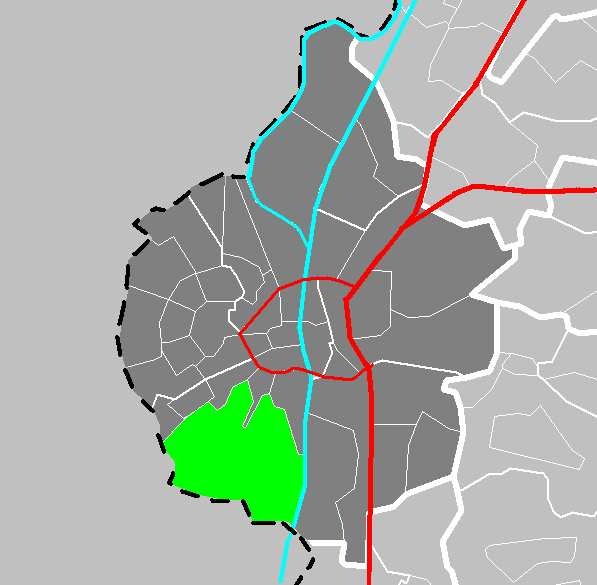
- Location of Sint Pieter in Maastricht
- Country: Netherlands
- Province: Limburg
- Municipality: Maastricht

Population
  - Total: 158

Sint Pieter (Saint Peter) is a neighbourhood in the city of Maastricht, in the Dutch province of Limburg. It is located on the western bank of the river Meuse, in the south of the city, and borders Belgium (both Flanders and Wallonia). It is a relatively affluent neighbourhood.

Sint Pieter used to be a separate village, and was also a separate municipality until it merged with Maastricht in 1920. The municipality covered the village of Sint Pieter and the hill Sint-Pietersberg.
