= Pieter =

Dutch male given name

- Pronunciation: Dutch: [ˈpitər]
- Gender: male
- Language: Dutch

Origin
- Origin: Greek
- Meaning: rock
- Region of origin: The Netherlands, Belgium, Greece

Other names
- Related names: Piet, Dieter, Peter, Pierre, Pete, Pietro, Piotr, Petr, Petar, Peder

Pieter is a male given name of Dutch and Greek origin. It is the Dutch form of Peter. The name has been one of the most common names in the Netherlands for centuries, but since the mid-twentieth century its popularity has dropped steadily, from almost 3000 per year in 1947 to about 100 a year in 2016.

Some of the better known people with this name are below. See for a longer list.

- Pieter de Coninck (?-1332), Flemish revolutionary
- Pieter van der Moere (c. 1480–1572), Flemish Franciscan missionary in Mexico known as "Pedro de Gante"
- Pieter Coecke van Aelst (1502–1550), Flemish artist, architect, and author
- Pieter Aertsen (1508–1575), Dutch Mannerist painter
- Pieter Pourbus (1523–1584), Netherlandish painter, sculptor, draftsman and cartographer
- Pieter Bruegel the Elder (c 1525–1569), Netherlandish painter
- Pieter Dirkszoon Keyser (1540–1596), Dutch navigator who mapped the southern sky
- Pieter Platevoet (1552–1622), Dutch-Flemish astronomer and cartographer better known as "Petrus Plancius"
- Pieter Pauw (1564–1617), Dutch botanist
- Pieter Brueghel the Younger (1564–1633), Netherlandish painter
- Pieter Both (1568–1615), first Governor-General of the Dutch East Indies
- Pieter Corneliszoon Hooft (1581–1647), Dutch historian, poet and playwright
- Pieter Lastman (1583–1633), Dutch painter of historical and biblical scenes
- Pieter de Carpentier (1586–1659), Dutch Governor-General of the Dutch East Indies 1623–27
- Pieter Nuyts (1598–1655), Dutch explorer, diplomat, and politician
- Pieter Claesz (1597–1660), Dutch still life painter
- Pieter Jansz Saenredam (1597–1665), Dutch painter of interiors
- Pieter van Laer (1599–1642), Dutch painter and printmaker
- Pieter de Grebber (c.1600–1653), Dutch Golden Age painter
- Pieter Post (1608–1669), Dutch architect
- Pieter Stuyvesant (later Peter) (c.1611–1672), Dutch Director-General of New Netherland 1647–64
- Pieter van der Faes (1618–1680), Dutch portrait painter in England known as "Peter Lely"
- Pieter Boel (1626–1674), Flemish still life and animal painter
- Pieter de Hooch (1629–1684), Dutch genre painter
- Pieter Leermans (1635-1706), Dutch painter
- Pieter van der Aa (1659–1733), Dutch publisher of maps and atlases
- Pieter Burmann the Elder (1668–1741), Dutch classical scholar
- Pieter van Musschenbroek (1692–1761), Dutch scientist and inventor
- Pieter Teyler van der Hulst (1702–1778), Dutch merchant and banker (of Teyler's Museum)
- Pieter Burmann the Younger (1714–1778), Dutch philologist
- Pieter Hellendaal (1721–1799), Dutch composer, organist and violinist
- Pieter van Maldere (1729–1768), South-Netherlandish violinist and composer
- Pieter Boddaert (1730–1795), Dutch physician and naturalist
- Pieter Gerardus van Overstraten (1755–1801), Governor-general of the Dutch East Indies 1796–1801
- Pieter Maurits Retief (1780–1838), South African Voortrekker leader
- Pieter Harting (1812–1885), Dutch biologist and naturalist
- Pieter de Decker (1812–1891), Prime Minister of Belgium 1855–57
- Pieter Bleeker (1819–1878), Dutch medical doctor, ichthyologist, and herpetologist
- Pieter Oyens (1842–1894), Dutch painter
- Pieter Cort van der Linden (1846–1935), Prime Minister of the Netherlands 1913–18
- Pieter Jelles Troelstra (1860–1930), Dutch socialist politician and republican
- Pieter Zeeman (1865–1943), Dutch physicist and Nobel laureate
- Pieter Cornelis Mondriaan (1872–1944), Dutch abstract painter
- Pieter Zandt (1880–1961), Dutch politician
- Pieter Sjoerds Gerbrandy (1885–1961), Prime Minister of the Netherlands in exile, 1940–45
- Pieter Geyl (1887–1966), Dutch historian
- Pieter Willem Botha (1916–2006), President of South Africa 1978–89
- Pieter Kooijmans (1933–2013), Dutch Minister of Foreign Affairs (1973–77, 1993–94)
- Pieter van Vollenhoven (born 1939), the husband of princess Margriet of The Netherlands
- Pieter van Dijk (born 1943), Dutch legal scholar and judge
- Pieter Aspe (1953–2021), Belgian crime fiction writer
- Pieter Hoekstra (born 1953), Dutch-American politician and diplomat
- Pieter De Crem (born 1962), Belgian Minister of Defence 2007–14
- Pieter Wispelwey (born 1962), Dutch cellist
- Pieter Smit (1963–2018), Dutch politician
- Pieter Timmermans, Belgian businessman
- Pieter Huistra (born 1967), Dutch footballer and football coach
- Pieter van den Hoogenband (born 1978), Dutch freestyle swimmer
- Pieter Weening (born 1981), Dutch road bicycle racer
- Pieter Timmers (born 1988), Belgian freestyle swimmer
- Pieter van Veen (born 1998), Dutch rower

== See also ==
- Sint Pieter, a village now incorporated in Maastricht
- Sint-Pieters, a suburb of Bruges
- Pieterburen, a village in the north of Groningen
- Peeter
