= Petri Kaverma =

Finnish artist and curator (born 1963)

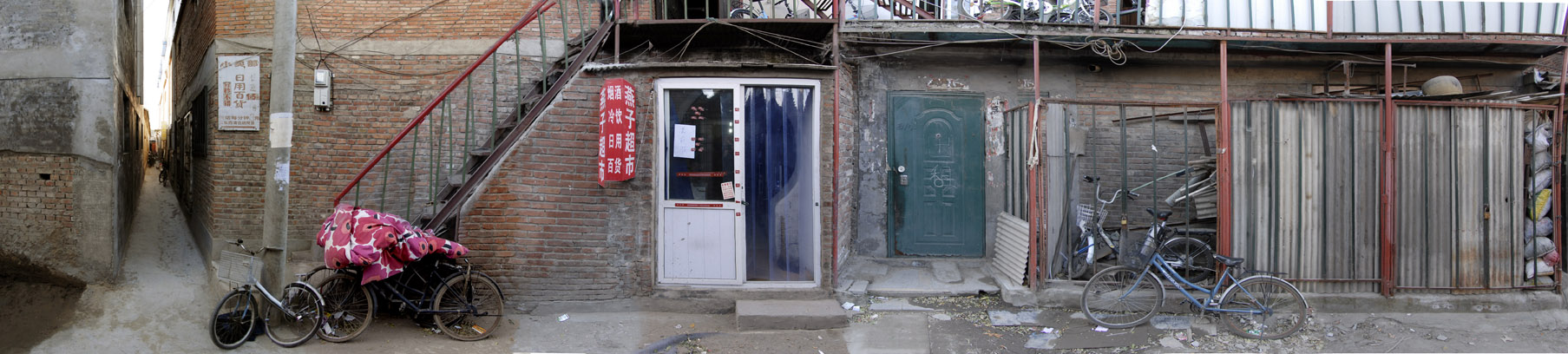
- Image: The Eight Homes" -slum/suburb, Beijing, China, 2008.
- Born: 4 March 1963 (age 63); Helsinki, Finland
- Education: FAFA, The Finnish Academy of Fine Arts
- Known for: Environmental artist, sculptor, installation artist

Petri Kaverma (born 4 March 1963) is a Finnish artist and curator who has held several private exhibitions, and participated in various group and joint exhibitions both in Finland and abroad. The themes of his exhibitions have ranged from universal issues to more private and personal topics, and the forms of expression Kaverma uses have varied from photography and video to mixed-media sculptures. Aiming to create a dialogue between the works and their physical and social setting, he has made several works for public spaces. Equally important are the works created in different cultures, particularly in Beijing, China in 2008. Kaverma has taught in several art schools as well as in the Academy of Fine Arts, Helsinki; he has curated exhibitions and organised visual art and environmental art projects both in Finland and abroad.

== See also ==
- Robert Smithson
- Site-specific art
- Environmental sculpture
