= Petri Haapimaa =

Finnish footballer (born 1976)

Petri Haapimaa (born 18 June 1976) is a Finnish retired professional footballer who played as a defender. He played for FinnPa in the Veikkausliiga.
