= Petri Lammassaari =

Finnish ice hockey player

- Born: August 6, 1985 (age 39); Eurajoki, Finland
- Height: 5 ft 10 in (178 cm)
- Weight: 172 lb (78 kg; 12 st 4 lb)
- Position: Right Wing
- Shoots: Right
- 2. Divisioona team; Former teams: Kopla; Lukko; Espoo Blues; KalPa; Graz 99ers Vaasan Sport; KooKoo; Herning Blue Fox; Starbulls Rosenheim
- NHL draft: Undrafted
- Playing career: 2005–present

Petri Lammassaari (born August 6, 1985) is a Finnish professional ice hockey forward. He is currently playing with Kopla of the 2. Divisioona. He previously played in the Finnish Liiga with Lukko, Espoo Blues, KalPa, Vaasan Sport and KooKoo.

Prior to the 2014–15 season, Jyrkkiö signed his first contract abroad in agreeing to a try-out contract with Austrian club, Graz 99ers in the EBEL on September 10, 2014. After just 11 games with the 99ers, Lammassaari opted to return to Finland, signing with Vaasan Sport on November 6, 2014.

== Career statistics ==
			Regular season					Playoffs
Season	Team	League	GP	G	A	Pts	PIM	GP	G	A	Pts	PIM
2005–06	Lukko	SM-l	50	7	4	11	38	—	—	—	—	—
2006–07	Lukko	SM-l	56	13	13	26	46	3	0	2	2	2
2007–08	Lukko	SM-l	56	12	12	24	30	3	2	0	2	10
2008–09	Blues	SM-l	50	20	10	30	18	14	7	3	10	26
2009–10	Blues	SM-l	11	4	2	6	0	2	1	1	2	0
2010–11	Blues	SM-l	53	19	5	24	24	18	7	5	12	8
2011–12	Blues	SM-l	19	6	4	10	2	—	—	—	—	—
2012–13	KalPa	SM-l	14	2	4	6	2	4	0	1	1	2
2012–13	SaPKo	Mestis	2	3	0	3	2	—	—	—	—	—
2013–14	KalPa	Liiga	41	2	4	6	16	—	—	—	—	—
2014–15	Graz 99ers	EBEL	11	3	7	10	8	—	—	—	—	—
Liiga totals			350	85	58	143	176	44	17	12	29	48
