= Piet (surname) =

Piet is a surname. Notable people with the surname include:

- Fernand Piet (1869–1942), French painter
- Frans Piët (1905–1997), Dutch comics artist, creator of the longest-running Dutch comics series of all time: Sjors & Sjimmie
- Henri Piet (1888–1915), French lightweight boxer
- Tony Piet (1906–1981), American Major League Baseball player
