= Piet Meiring =

South African theologian and academic

Piet Meiring is a South African theologian and academic. He is a Dutch Reformed Church in South Africa minister and the former director of the Centre for Public Theology at the University of Pretoria. He served on the Truth and Reconciliation Commission.
