= Petrus (surname) =

The surname Petrus may refer to:

- Annick Petrus (born 1961), French Saint Martinois politician
- Brent Petrus (born 1975), American football player
- Jacques Fred Petrus (1948–1987), French-Italian business man
- Junauda Petrus (born 1981), American author and performance artist
- Lars Petrus (born 1960), Swedish speedcuber and inventor of the Petrus method
- Mitch Petrus (1987–2019), American football player
