= List of women's and gender studies academics =

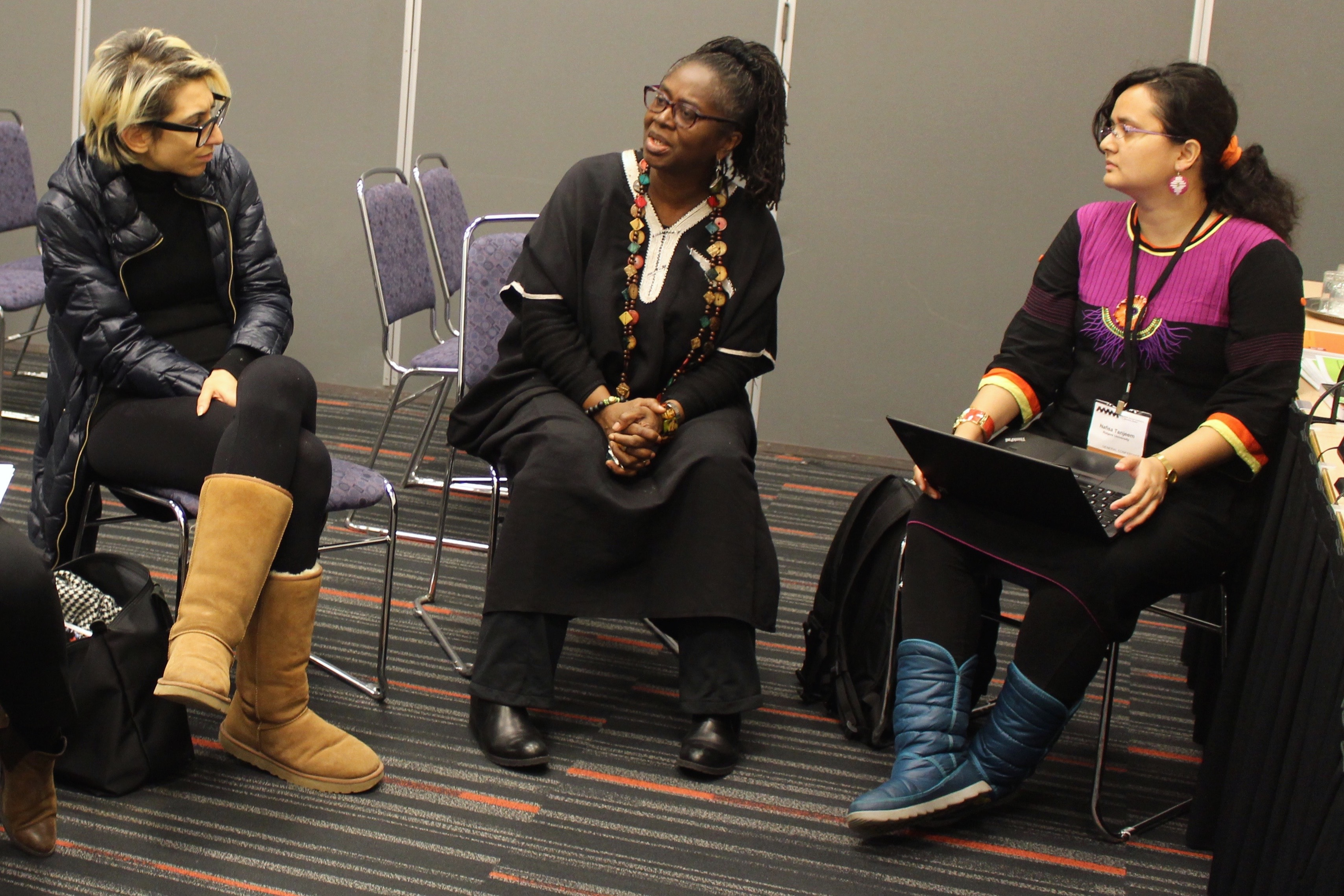
Participants at the NWSA Conference 2016

Women's studies is an academic field that draws on feminist and interdisciplinary methods to place women's lives and experiences at the center of study, while examining social and cultural constructs of gender; systems of privilege and oppression; and the relationships between power and gender as they intersect with other identities and social locations such as race, sexual orientation, socio-economic class, and disability.

Gender studies is an interdisciplinary academic field devoted to analysing gender identity and gendered representation. Gender studies originated in the field of women's studies, concerning women, feminism, gender, and politics. The field now overlaps with queer studies and men's studies. Its rise to prominence, especially in Western universities after 1990, coincided with the rise of deconstruction.

== Albania ==
- Eglantina Gjermeni (born 1968), Albanian politician promoting gender equality

== Argentina ==
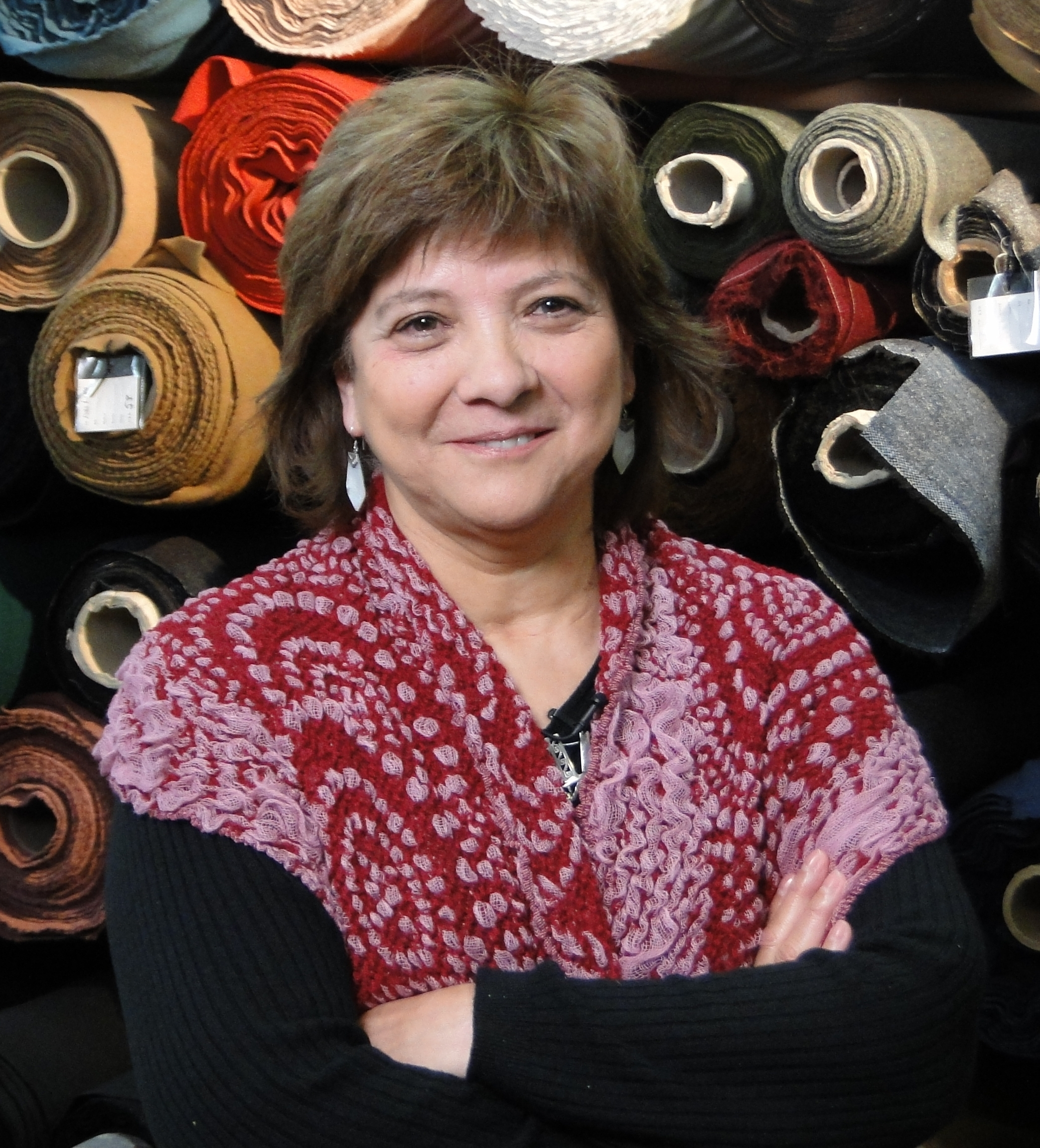
Mirta Zaida Lobato (Argentina)

- Ana Amado (1946–2016), Argentine political scientist and feminist, headed the women and society department at the Latin American Institute for Transnational Studies
- Judith Astelarra (born 1943), Argentine sociologist active in women's studies in Spain
- Nora Domínguez (born 1951), Argentine academic, co-founder of the Interdisciplinary Institute of Gender Studies at the University of Buenos Aires
- Hilda Habichayn (1934–2021), Argentine sociologist and feminist, founder of the Center for Historical Studies on Women at the National University of Rosario
- Mirta Zaida Lobato (born 1948), Argentine historian, specializing in societal history and gender relations in LAtin America

== Armenia ==
- Arlene Voski Avakian (born 1939), Armenian academic based in the United States, specializing in women's studies and food history

== Australia ==
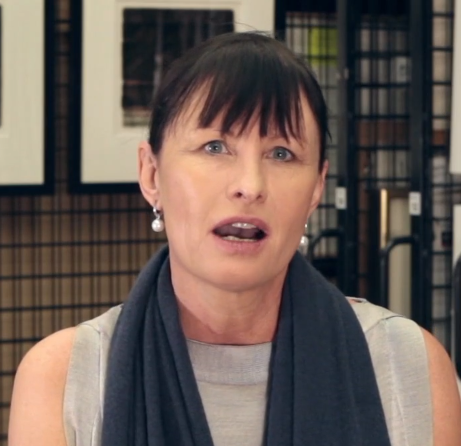
Catherine Lumby (Australia)

- Sara Ahmed (born 1969), British-Australian writer and scholar specializing in feminist theory, lesbian feminism and queer theory
- Marian Baird (fl. 2001), Australian academic researcher, professor of gender and employment relations at the University of Sydney
- Chilla Bulbeck (born 1951), Australian sociologist and former professor of women's studies at Adelaide University
- Catharine Lumby (fl. 1999), Australian academic and writer advising and publishing on gender issues
- Elspeth Probyn (1958–2025), Australian academic, professor of gender and cultural studies at the University of Sydney
- Kane Race, professor of gender and cultural studies at the University of Sydney

== Austria ==
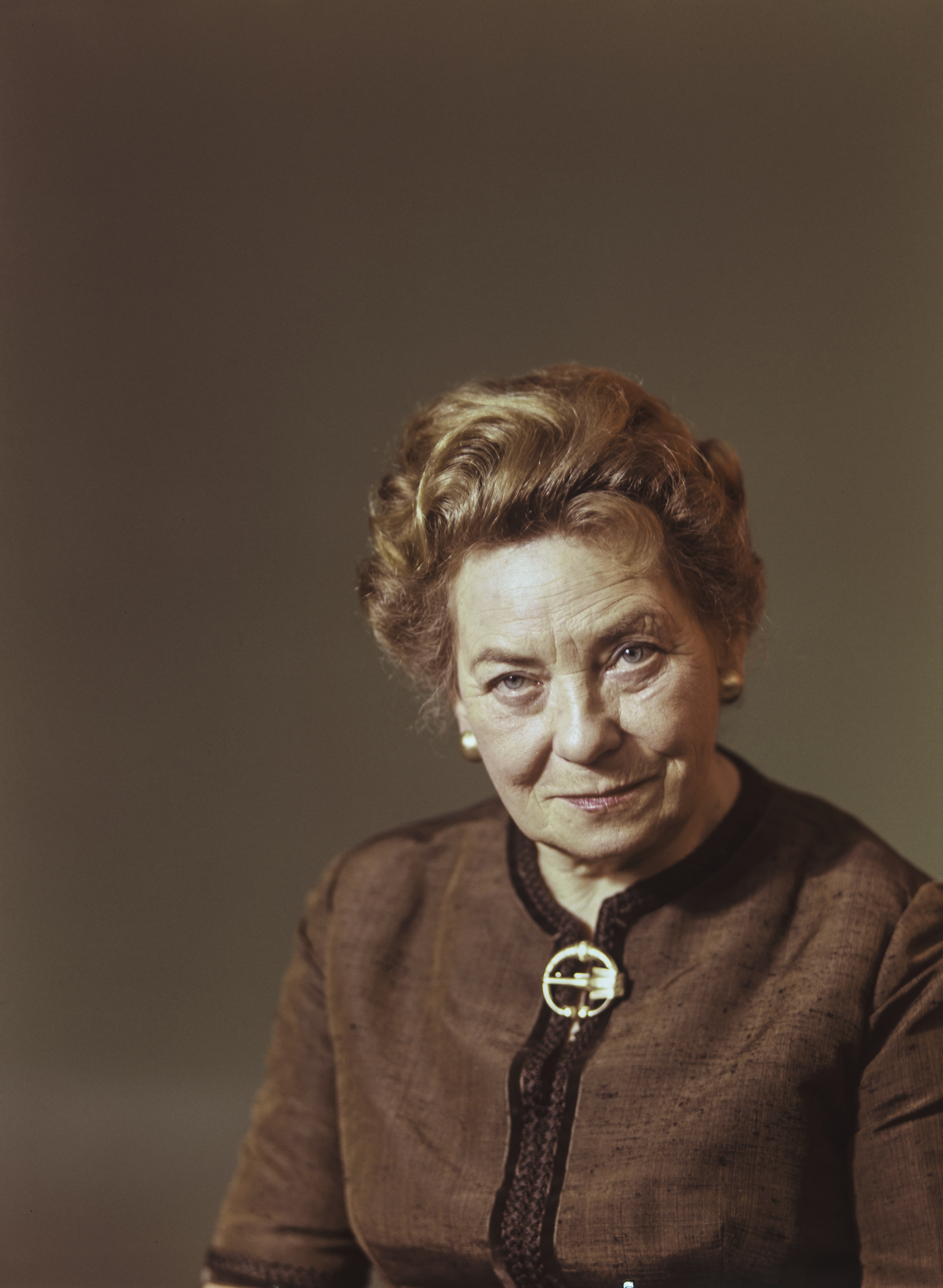
Hertha Firnberg (Austria)

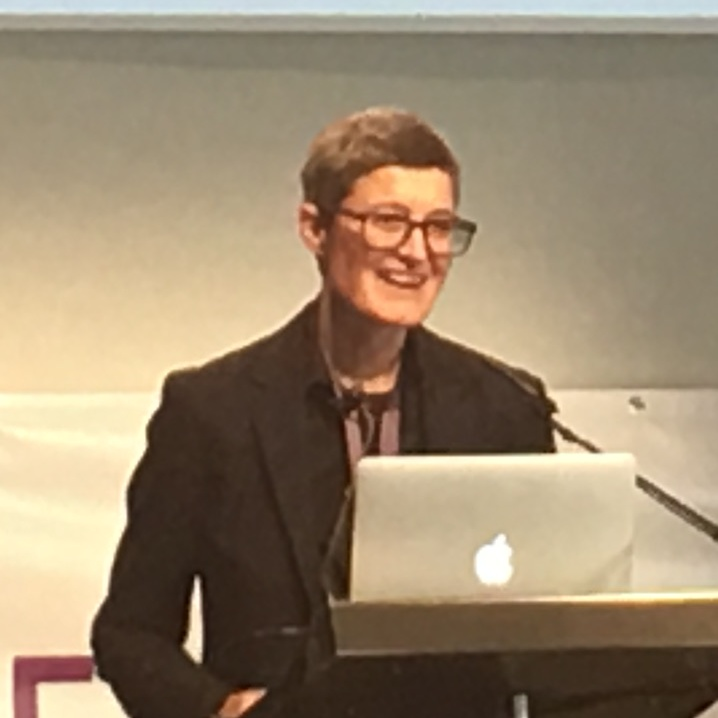
Elisabeth Holzleither (Austria)

- Hertha Firnberg (1909–1994), Austrian politician and statistician
- Daniela Hammer-Tugendhat (born 1946), feminist Austrian art historian and pioneer of women's studies courses at the University of Vienna
- Elisabeth Holzleithner (born 1970), Austrian academic specializing in legal philosophy and gender studies at the University of Vienna
- Utta Isop (born 1974), Austrian philosopher and gender researcher focusing on gender democracy and social movements
- Ilse Korotin (born 1957), Austrian philosopher and sociologists focusing of feminist biographical research
- Maria Mesner (born 1960), Austrian modern historian heading the University of Vienna gender studies program
- Edith Saurer (1942–2011), Austrian historian, cofounder of feminist historiography
- Sabine Strasser (born 1962), Austrian social anthropologist specializing in migration and gender studies
- Erika Weinzierl (1925–2014), Austrian historian and gender researcher

== Bahamas ==
- Angelique Nixon (fl. 2010s), Bahamian academic based in Trinidad, lecturer at the Institute for Gender and Development Studies at the University of the West Indies

== Belgium ==
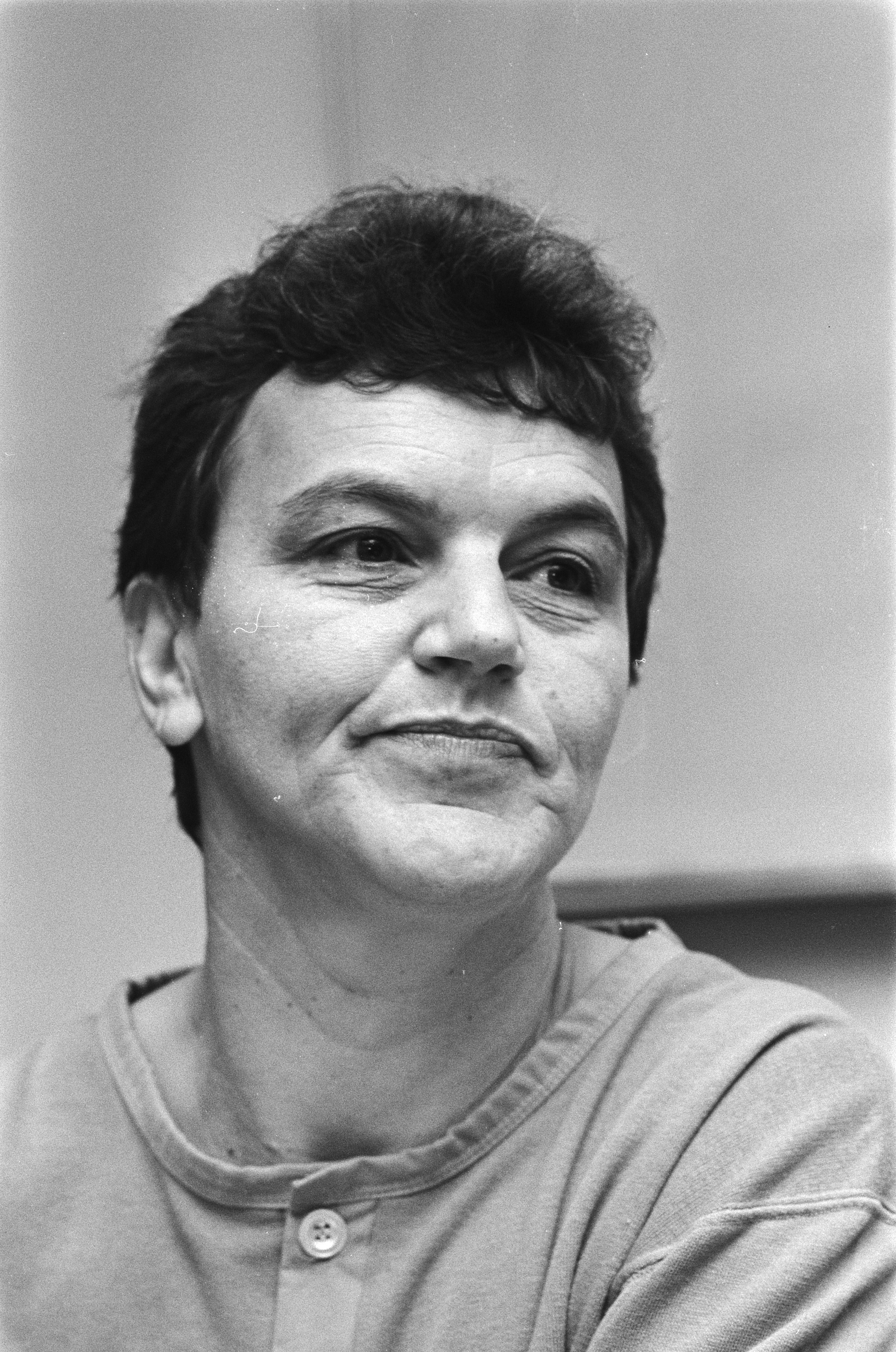
Monika Triest, 1985 (Belgium)

- Rita Mulier (born 1934), Belgian feminist and economist, founder of the Women's Consultation Committee and specializing in mother's rights in the workplace
- Monika Triest (born 1941), founder of women's studies programs at the University of Cincinnati and University of Amsterdam

== Brazil ==
- Neuma Aguiar (1938-2023), pioneering sociologist who helped lay the foundations for women's studies in Brazil
- Dodi Leal (born 1984), Brazilian academic and trans rights activist, active in performance and gender studies in Brazil
- Suzana Prates (1940–1988), Brazilian feminist and sociologist active in Uruguay, founder of the Study Group on the Condition of Women in Uruguay

== Bulgaria ==
- Krassimira Daskalova (born 1957), Bulgarian academic and pioneer in gender studies
- Yvanka B. Raynova (born 1959), Bulgarian philosopher and feminist, professor of contemporary philosophy at the Bulgarian Academy of Sciences

== Canada ==
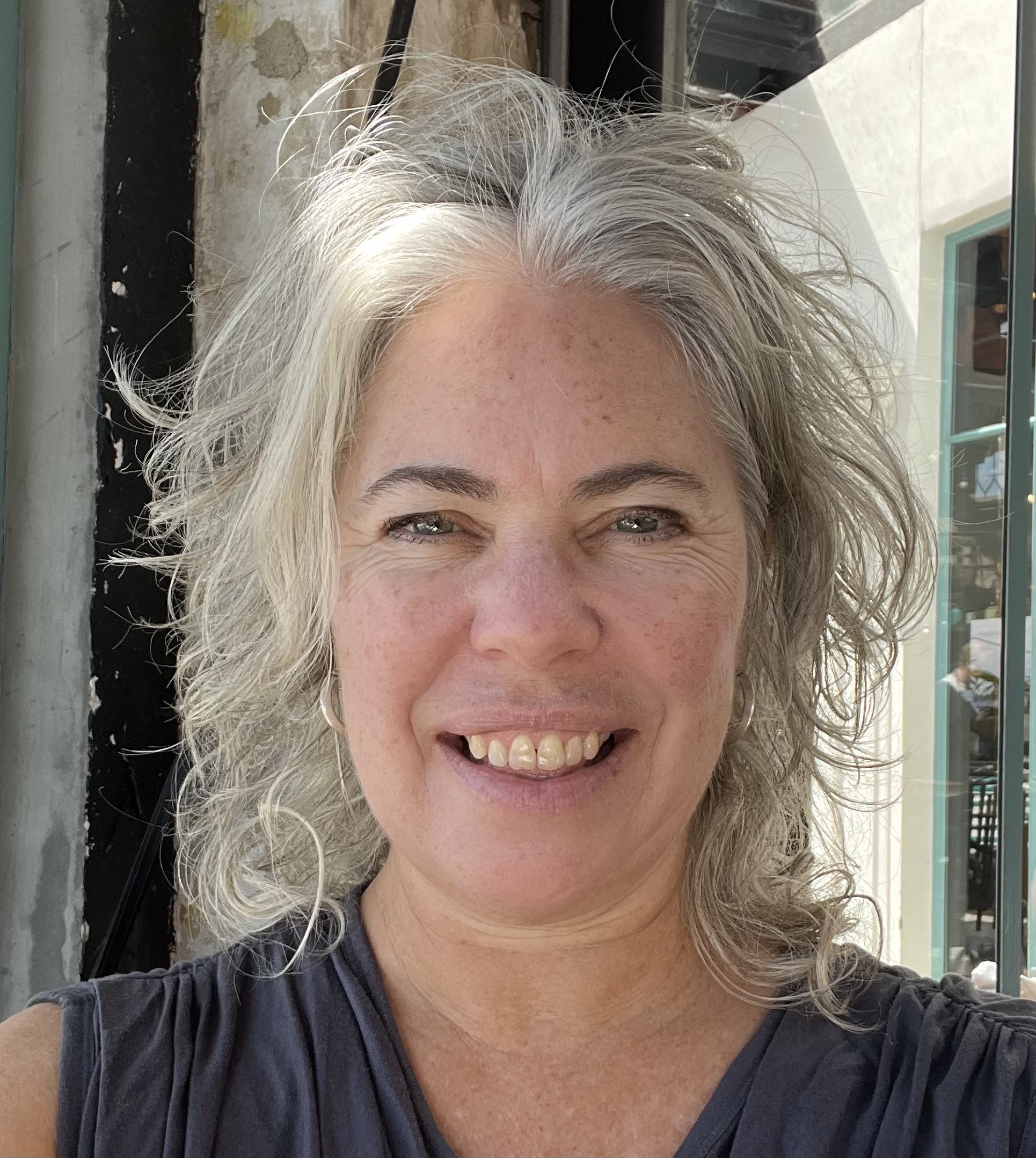
Sheila Cavanagh (Canada)

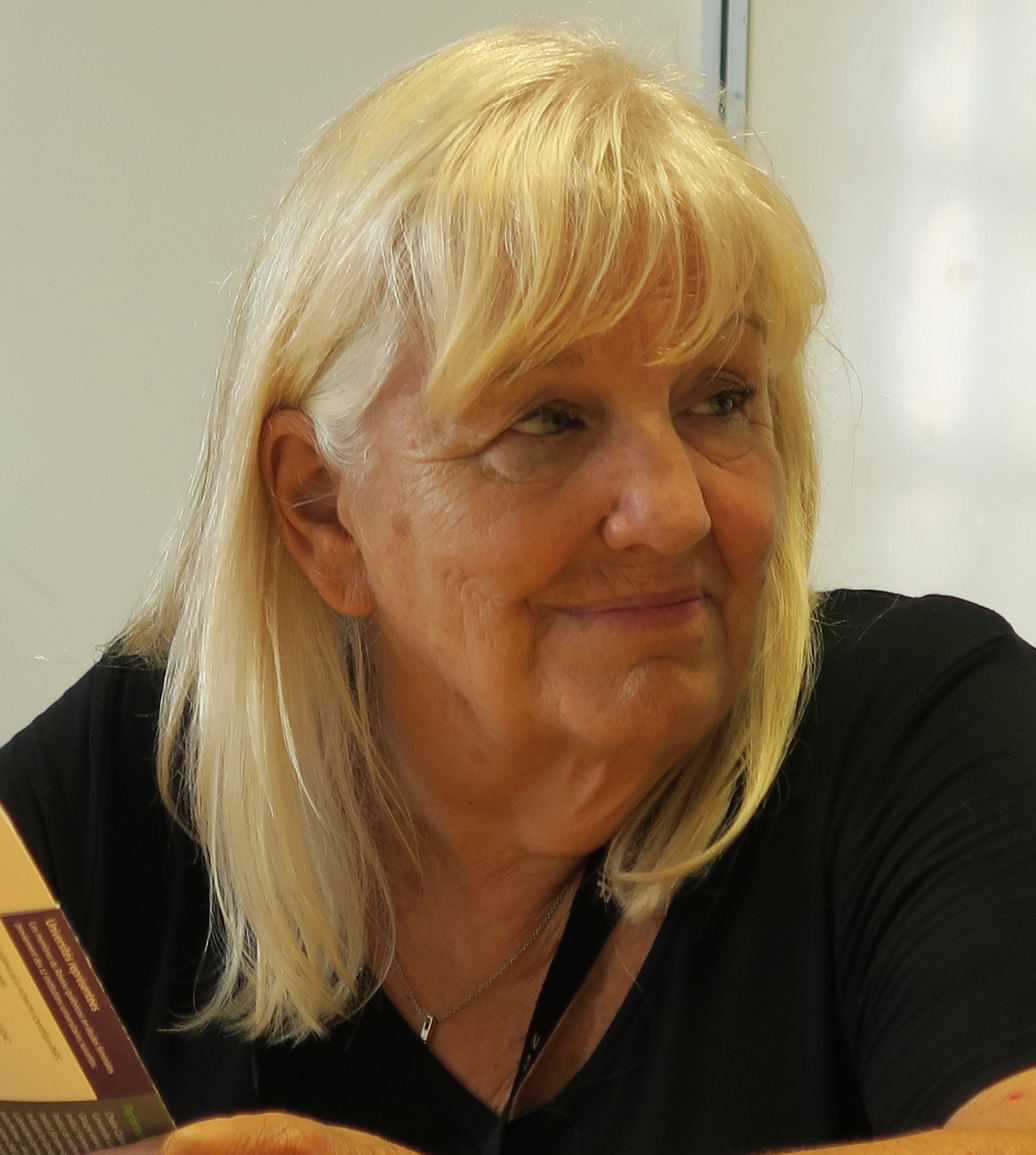
Francine Descarries (Canada)

- Maija Blaubergs (1947–2010), Latvian-Canadian feminist scholar, coordinator of the University of Georgia's women's studies program
- Sheila Cavanagh (fl. 2000s), Canadian academic, former chair of the sexuality studies program at York University covering gender studies, feminist theory and queer theory
- Yolande Cohen (born 1960), Moroccan-born Canadian historian focusing on the history of women
- Huguette Dagenais (born 1943), French-Canadian anthropologist, ran the first women's studies program at Université Laval
- Francine Descarries (born 1942), Canadian sociologist and leading figure in feminist studies in Quebec
- Margaret Gillett (1930–2019), Australian-Canadian pedagogue, who was the founding director of the women's studies program at McGill University
- Grace Jantzen (1948–2006), Canadian feminist philosopher and theologian, former professor of religion, culture and gender at Manchester University
- Anne Klinck (1943–2023), Canadian academic, authority on the female voice in lyric poetry
- Hilary M. Lips (born 1940), Canadian academic and writer, founder of the Center for Gender Studies at Radford University, Virginia
- Katherine McKittrick (born 1970), Canadian academic, professor of gender studies at Queen's University, specializing in Black feminist geography
- Wendy Mitchinson (1947–2021), Canadian historian at the University of Waterloo, researching gender and medical history
- Viviane Namaste (fl. 2001), Canadian feminist academic at Concordia University, Montreal, focusing on sexual health and sex work
- Jane L. Parpart (1940-), American social historian who was the first coordinator for the women's studies program at Dalhousie University, after it gained degree status in 1988.
- Veronica Strong-Boag, (born 1947) founding Director of the Centre for Women's and Gender Studies at the University of British Columbia
- Evangelia Tastsoglou (born 1968), Greek-Canadian sociologist, researching issues of gender, international migration and gender-based violence
- Barbara Taylor (born 1950), Canadian historian based in the United Kingdom, specializing in the Enlightenment and gender studies at Queen Mary, University of London
- Rebecca Tiessen (born 1970), Canadian sociologist who specializes in studying gender and international development.
- Leah Vosko (born 1971), Canadian academic focusing on political economy, labour rights, gender studies, migration, and citizenship

== Chile ==
- Olga Grau (born 1945), Chilean academic specializing in gender, sexuality, philosophy, education and literature
- Virginia Guzmán Barcos (born 1943), Chilean psychologist, deputy director of the Center for Women's Studies in Santiago

== China ==
- Liang Jun (born 1945), Chinese activist, campaigner for women's right to education in China
- Li Xiaojiang (born 1951), introduced women's studies to China and wrote Progress of Mankind and Liberation of Womanhood (1983), the first work on women published in the country since 1949.

== Colombia ==
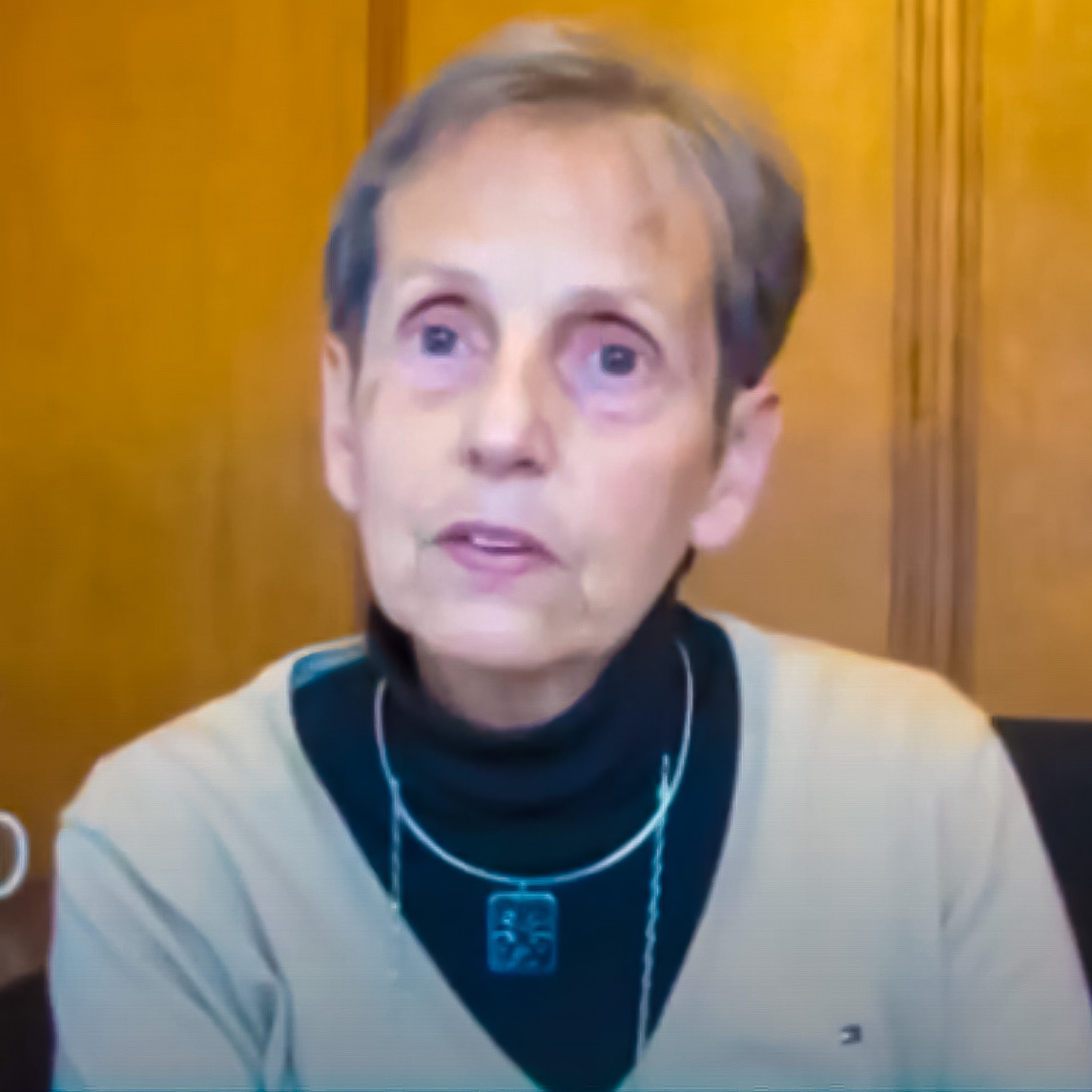
Florence Thomas (French-Colombian)

- Magdalena León de Leal (born 1939), Colombian feminist sociologist, specializing in women's studies
- Florence Thomas (born 1943), French-Colombian social psychologist. founder of the women's studies progra, at the National University of Colombia

== Croatia ==
- Rada Borić (born 1951), Croatian scholar, feminist and women's rights activist, cofounder of the first Croatian gender studies program

== Cuba ==
- Norma Vasallo Barrueta (fl. 1990s), Cuban feminist research, head of the Women's Department at the University of Havana

== Curaçao ==
- Joceline Clemencia (1952–2011), Afro-Curaçaoan writer, linguist and feminist

== Czech Republic ==
- Věra Sokolová (born 1970), Czech academic specializing in gender studies

== Denmark ==
- Signe Arnfred (born 1944), Danish sociologist and feminist, organized meetings and seminars leading to gender studies
- Ann-Dorte Christensen (born 1954), Danish social scientist, professor of sociology of gender at Aalborg University
- Eva Hemmer Hansen (1913–1983), Danish writer and feminist, chair of the Danish Women's Society
- Lene Koch (born 1947), Danish feminist and historian. active in establishing the Centre for Women's Research at the University of Copenhagen
- Nynne Koch (1915–2001), Danish feminist, pioneering researcher in gender studies, active in the establishment of Kvinfo, the Danish Centre for Research on Women and Gender
- Nina Lykke (born 1939), Danish academic active in Sweden, recognized for her work on feminist theory, former professor of gender studies at Linköping University
- Harriet Bjerrum Nielsen (born 1948), Danish philologist and gender studies scholar at the University of Oslo, specializing in gender and identity and gender socialization
- Tania Ørum (born 1945), Danish feminist and literary historian specializing in women's and gender studies
- Birgitte Possing (born 1952), Danish historian specializing in historical biography in connection with the Danish women's biographical dictionary Dansk kvindebiografisk leksikon

== Dominican Republic ==
- Ochy Curiel (born 1963), Afro-Dominican feminist, academic and social anthropologist, known for helping to establish the Afro-Caribbean women's movement

== Ethiopia ==
- Zenebework Tadesse (fl. 1976), Ethiopian sociologist and researcher on democracy, gender and women's rights in Africa

== Finland ==
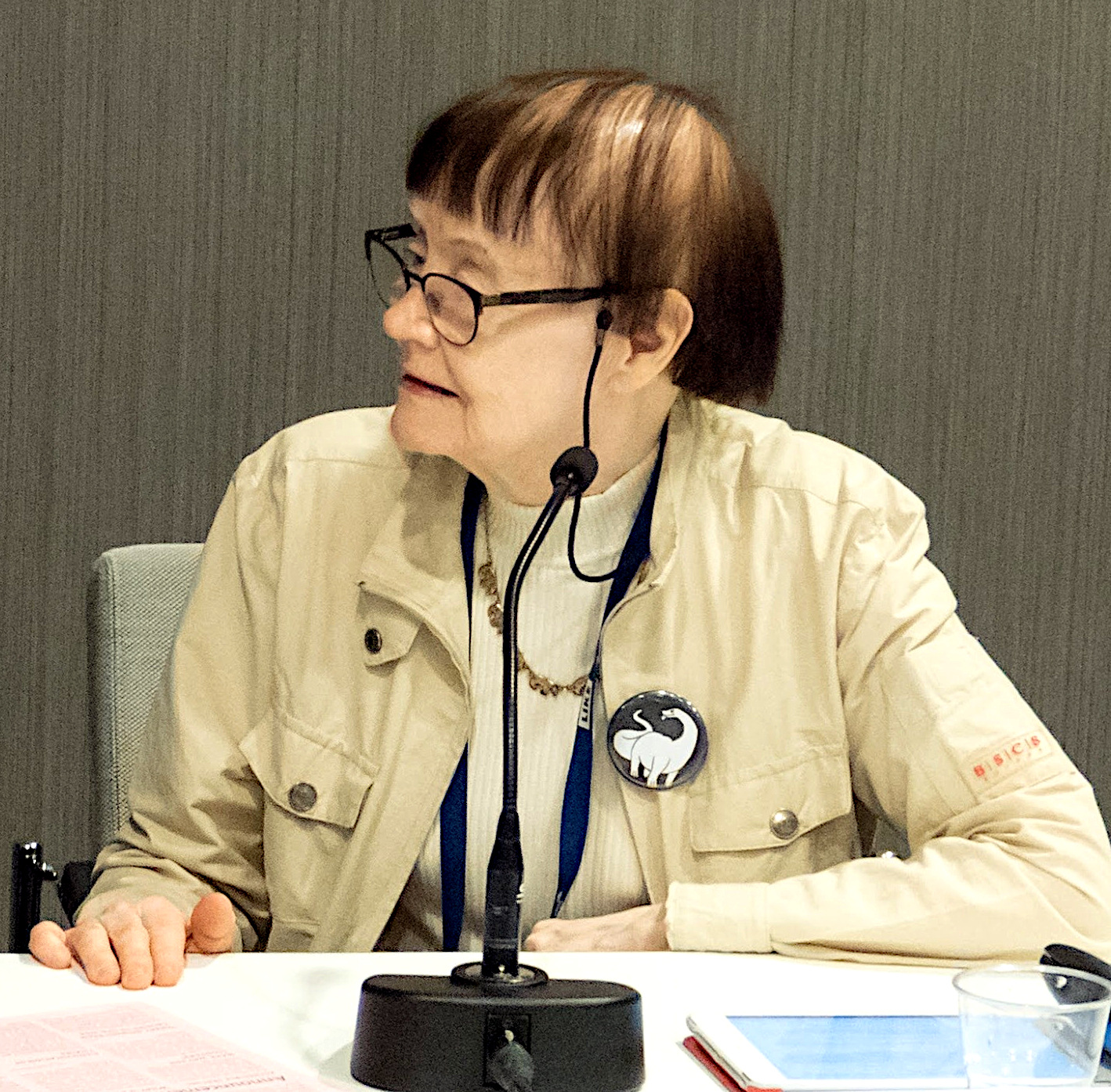
Liisa Rantalaiho (Finland)

- Solveig Bergman (born 1955), Finnish sociologist, former director of the Nordic Gender Institute in Olso
- Elina Haavio-Mannila (born 1933), Finnish social scientist and former professor of sociology
- Aili Nenola (born 1942), Finnish academic active in folklore and the development of women's studies at the University of Tartu and at the Kristina Institute
- Liisa Rantalaiho (born 1933), Finnish sociologist active in gender studies
- Päivi Setälä (1943–2014), Finnish historian advocating women's research
- Harriet Silius (born 1948), Finnish professor of women's studies at Åbp Akademi University, editor of the Nordic Journal of Women's Studies
- Ulla Vuorela (1945–2011), Finnish social anthropologist active in women's and gender studies

== France ==
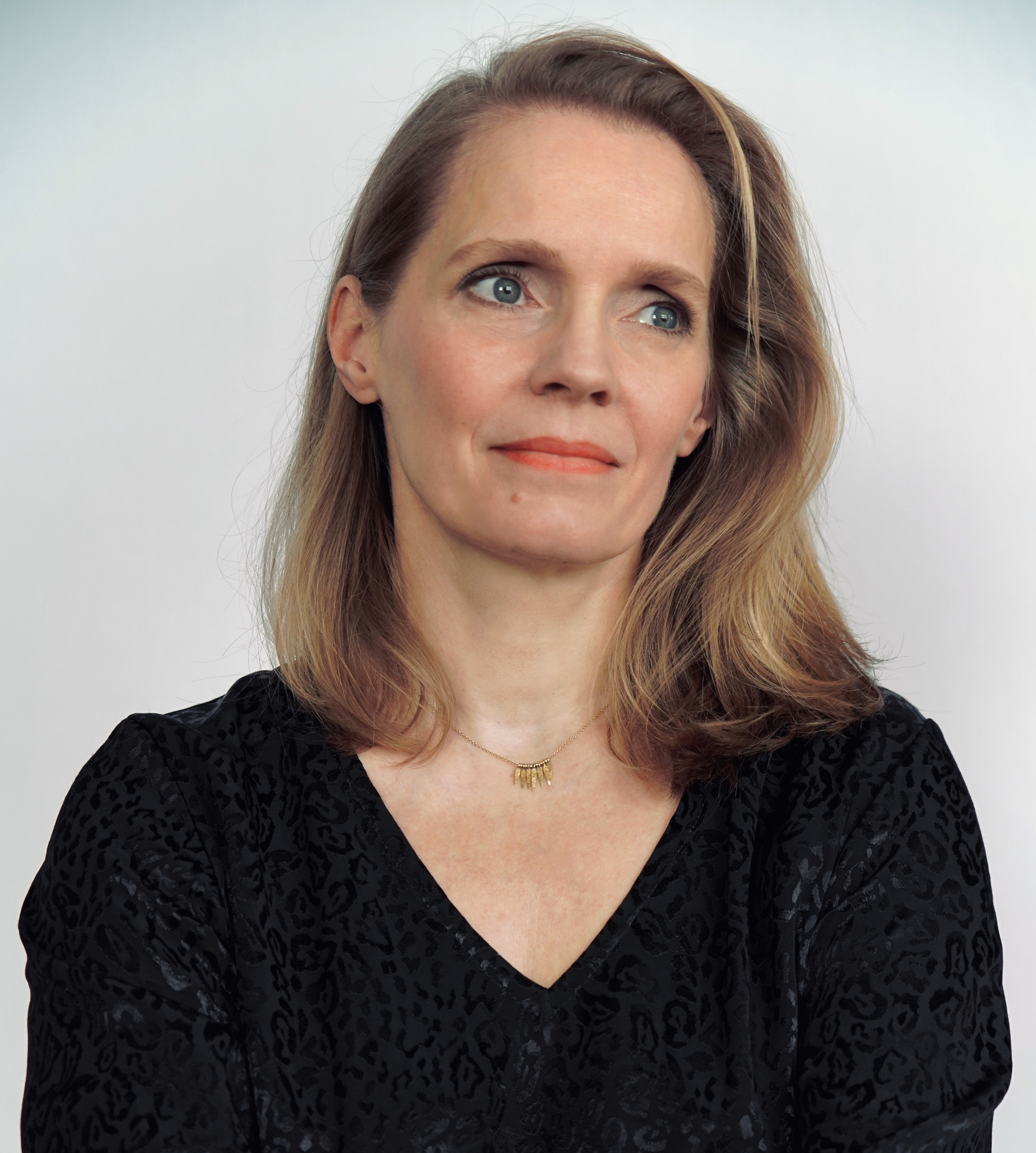
Camille Froidevaux-Metterie (France)

- Sophie Bessis (born 1947), Tunisian-French historian and feminist writer
- Anne-Marie Devreux (born 1952), French sociologist specializing in feminism and the sociology of gender relations
- Jane Freedman (born 1968), British-French sociologist researching gender violence, conflict and migration
- Camille Froidevaux-Metterie (born 1968), French philosopher focusing on changes affecting the status of women
- Delphine Gardey (born 1967), French historian and sociologist, director of the Institute of Gender Studies at the University of Geneva
- Nahema Hanafi (born 1983), French historian, researching history of medicine, women's place in history and directing master's degree in gender studies
- Gabrielle Houbre (fl. 1996), French historian researching gender and history of sexuality at the University of Paris VII
- Danièle Kergoat (born 1942), French academic focusing on gender and social relations of sex, work and social movements
- Margaret Maruani (1954–2022), Tunisian-French sociologist researching labor market and gender
- Nicole-Claude Mathieu (1937–2014), French anthropologist and feminist
- Juliette Rennes (fl. 1990s), French sociologist and academic, researching topics related to the history and sociology of gender, work and discrimination
- Michelle Zancarini-Fournel (born 1947), French historian, specializing in the history of women and gender as well as May 68

== Germany ==
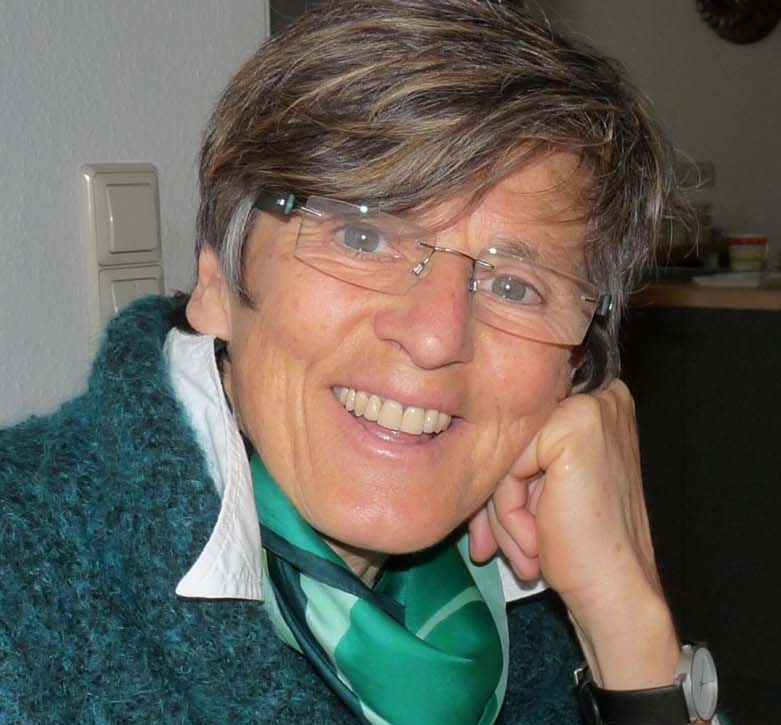
Monika Barz (Germany)

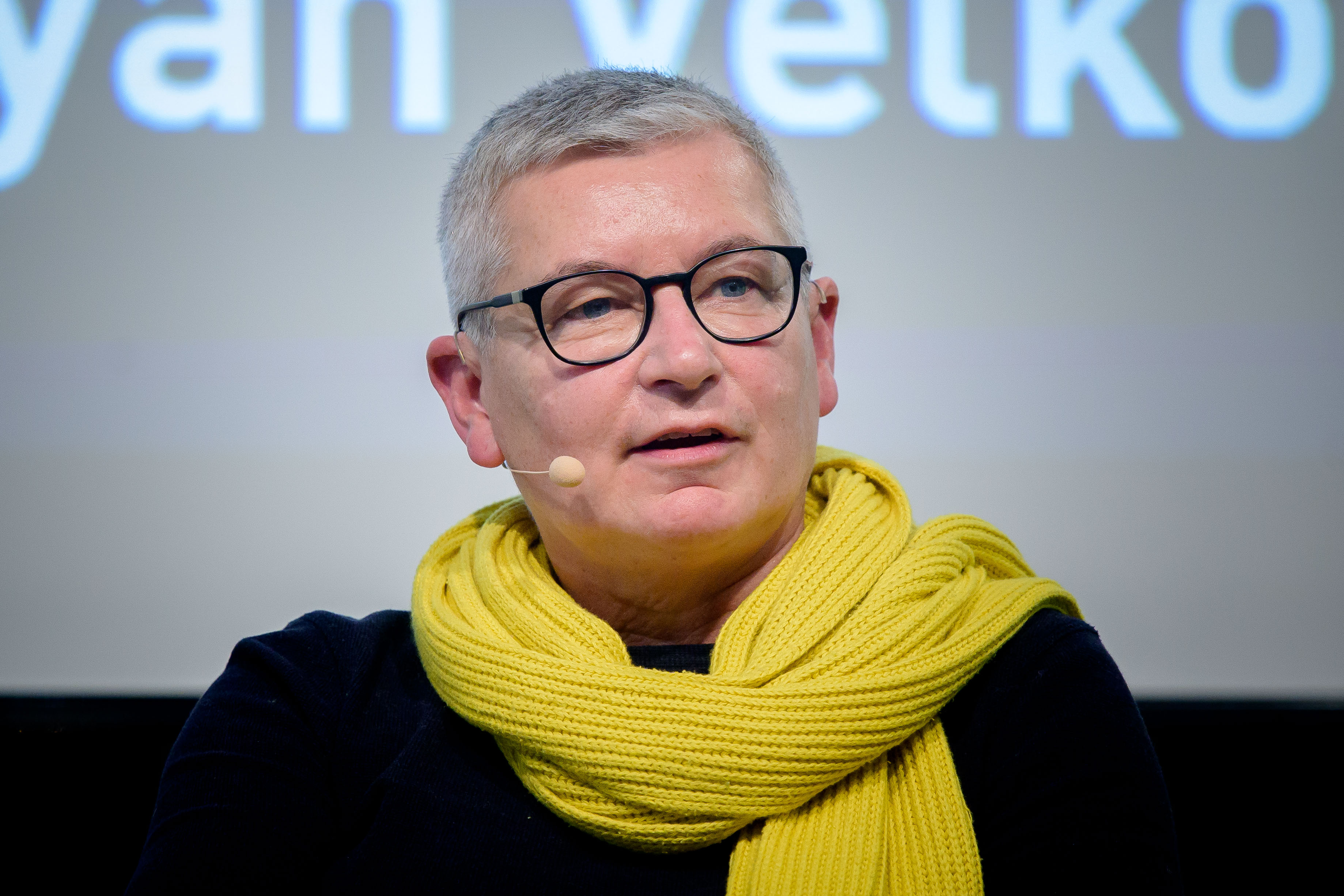
Sabine Hark (Germany)

- Monika Barz (born 1953), German academic, former professor of women and gender studies the Evangelical University in Ludwigsburg
- Corinna Bath (born 1963), German computer scientist heading the Women's Studies and Gender Studies Center at the University of Duisburg-Essen
- Irene Below (born 1942), German art historian with a particular interest in women in the history of art
- Margrit Brückner (born 1948), German feminist sociologist known for her work on violence against women
- Irene Dölling (born 1942), German sociologist, former professor of women's studies at Potsdam University
- Sabine Hark (born 1982), German feminist and sociologist, former director of women's and gender studies at the Technical University of Berline
- Friederike Hassauer (1951–2021), German philologist pioneering gender research in Romance studies at the University of Vienna
- Annette Henninger (born 1966), German political scientist, professor of politics and gender relations at the University of Marburg
- Ursula King (born 1938), German theologian specializing in gender and religion
- Maria Kublitz-Kramer (fl. 1995), German literary academic focusing on gender, Jewish authors and cultural studies
- Hildegard Maria Nickel (born 1948), German sociologist specializing in gender studies
- Heike Mauer (fl. 2015), German gender theorist and feminist, member of the German Women's and Gender Research Network
- Sigrid Metz-Göckel (1940–2025), German sociologist and political scientist, pioneering women's and gender studies at the University of Dortmund
- Beate von Miquel (born 1968), German women's rights advocate and gender studies scholar at Ruhr University Bochum
- Christa Mulack (1943–2021), German feminist theologian and writer with an emphasis on matriarchy
- Viktoria Schmidt-Linsenhoff (1944–2013), German arti historian researching gender studies
- Ursula G. T. Müller (born 1944), German feminist and sociologist, active in the development of women's studies
- Gesine Spieß (1945–2016), German academic specializing in gender studies at the University of Applied Sciences in Erfurt
- Claudia von Werlhof (born 1943), German sociologist, held Austria's first professorship of women's studies
- Elahe Haschemi Yekani (fl. 2000s), German academic at Humboldt University of Berlin specializing in research on gender studies, queer theories and intersectionality

== Ghana ==
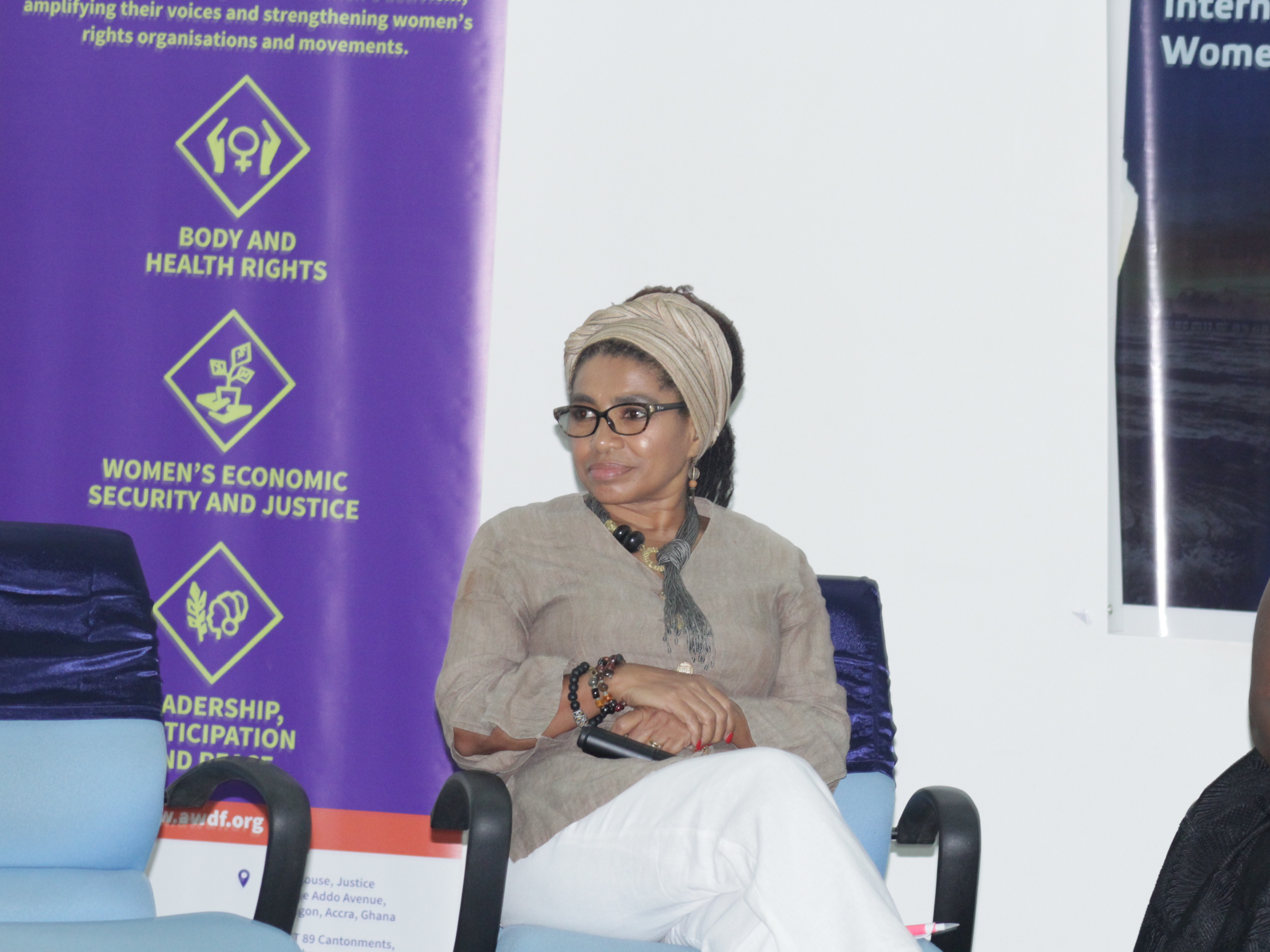
Akosua Adomako Ampofo (Ghana)

- Akosua Adomako Ampofo (fl. 1990), Ghanaian feminist scholar, professor of gender studies

== Greece ==
- Rania Antonopoulou (born 1960), Greek economist and politician, specialist in macroeconomic gender issues and former policy advisor for UN Women

== Hungary ==
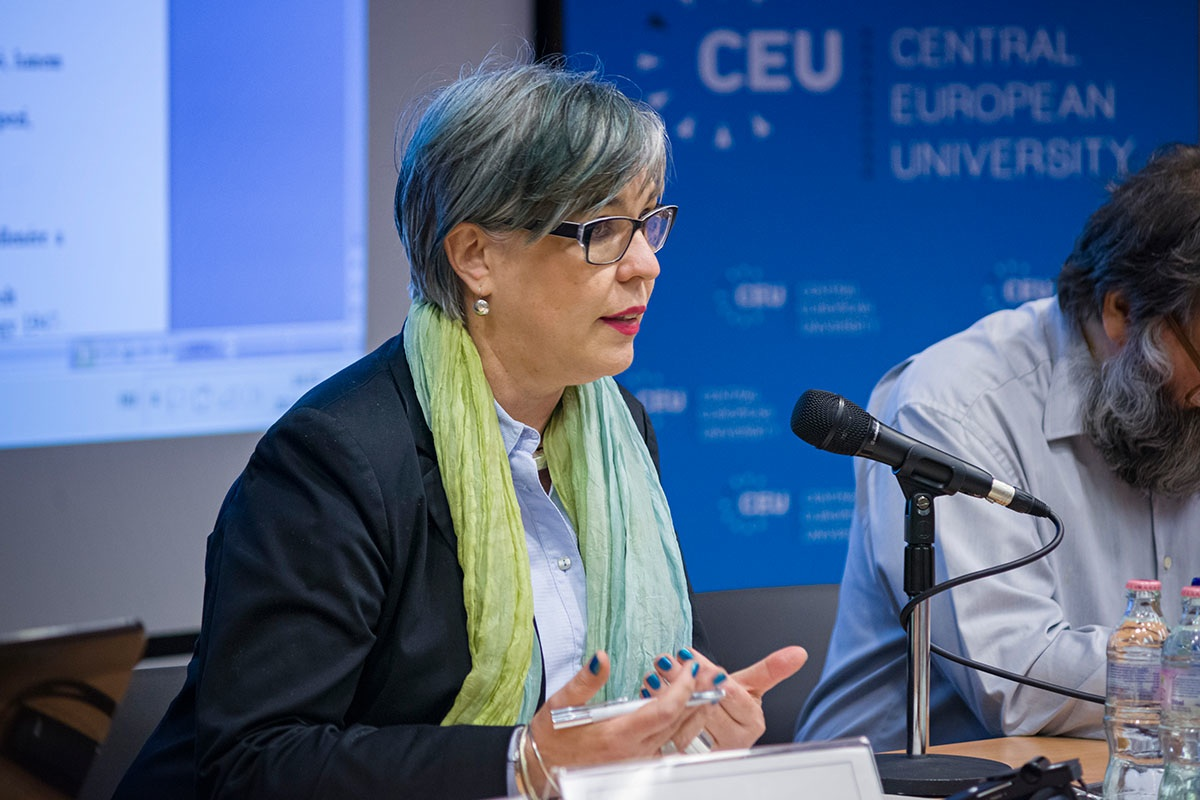
Andrea Pető (Hungary)

- Andrea Pető (born 1964), Hungarian historian, gender studies academic

== Indonesia ==
- Lily Yulianti Farid (1971–2023), Indonesian writer interested in gender and citizens' participation in media

== India ==
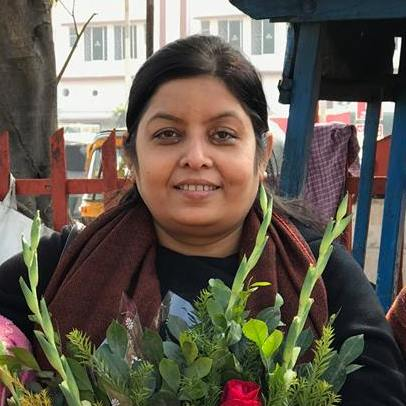
Rashm Tiwari (India)

- Padala Bhudevi (fl. 2000s), Indian social activist helping Savara women with entrepreneurship
- Nupur Chaudhuri (born 1943), Indian academic working in the United States, member of the Coordinating Council for Women in History
- Meera Kosambi (1939–2015), Indian sociologist, director of the Research Centre for Women's Studies at the SNDT University for Women, Mumbai
- Purnima Mane (fl. 1990s), Indian writer, international expert on sexual and reproductive health, founding editor of Culture, Health and Sexuality
- Chandra Talpade Mohanty (born 1955), Indian-American sociologist and chair of the women's studies department chair at Syracuse University in New York
- Gayatri Reddy (fl. 2000), Indian anthropologist, associate professor of anthropology, gender and women's studies at the University of Illinois at Chicago
- Rashmi Tiwari (born 1972), Indian economist addressing women's issues as director of the Aahan Foundationf For Social Change

== Iran ==
- Zahra Kamalkhani (born 1954), Iranian anthropologist, active in gender studies at the University of Bergen and subsequently conducting research in Australia

== Ireland ==
- Mary D. Cullen (born 1929), co-founder of the Women's History Association of Ireland
- Lindsey Earner-Byrne (fl. 2007), Irish historian focusing on gender history and associated with various international organizations
- Margaret Gallagher (fl. 1978), Irish researcher specializing in gender and media
- Gerardine Meaney (born 1962), Irish academic and feminist

== Israel ==
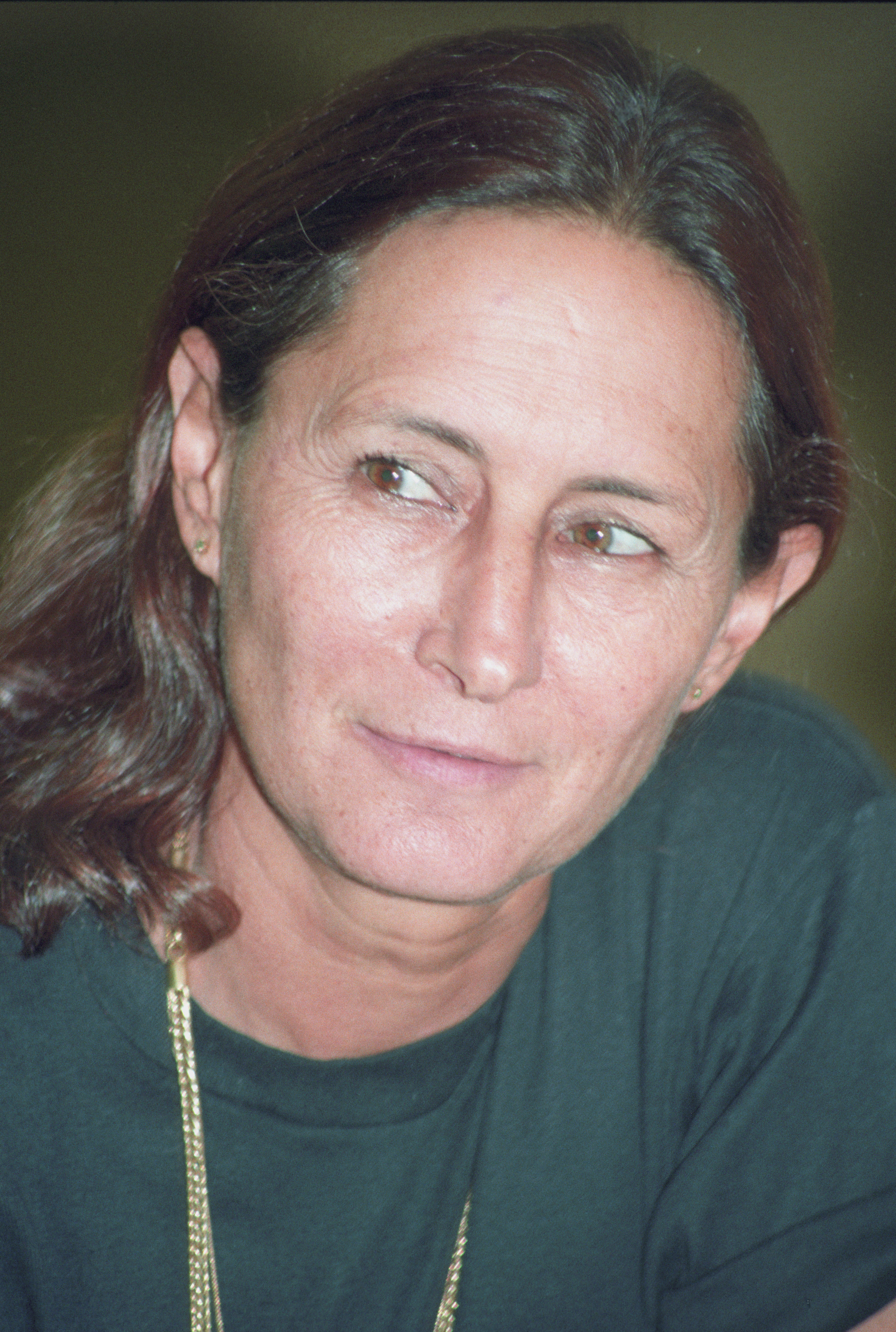
Yael Datan (Israel)

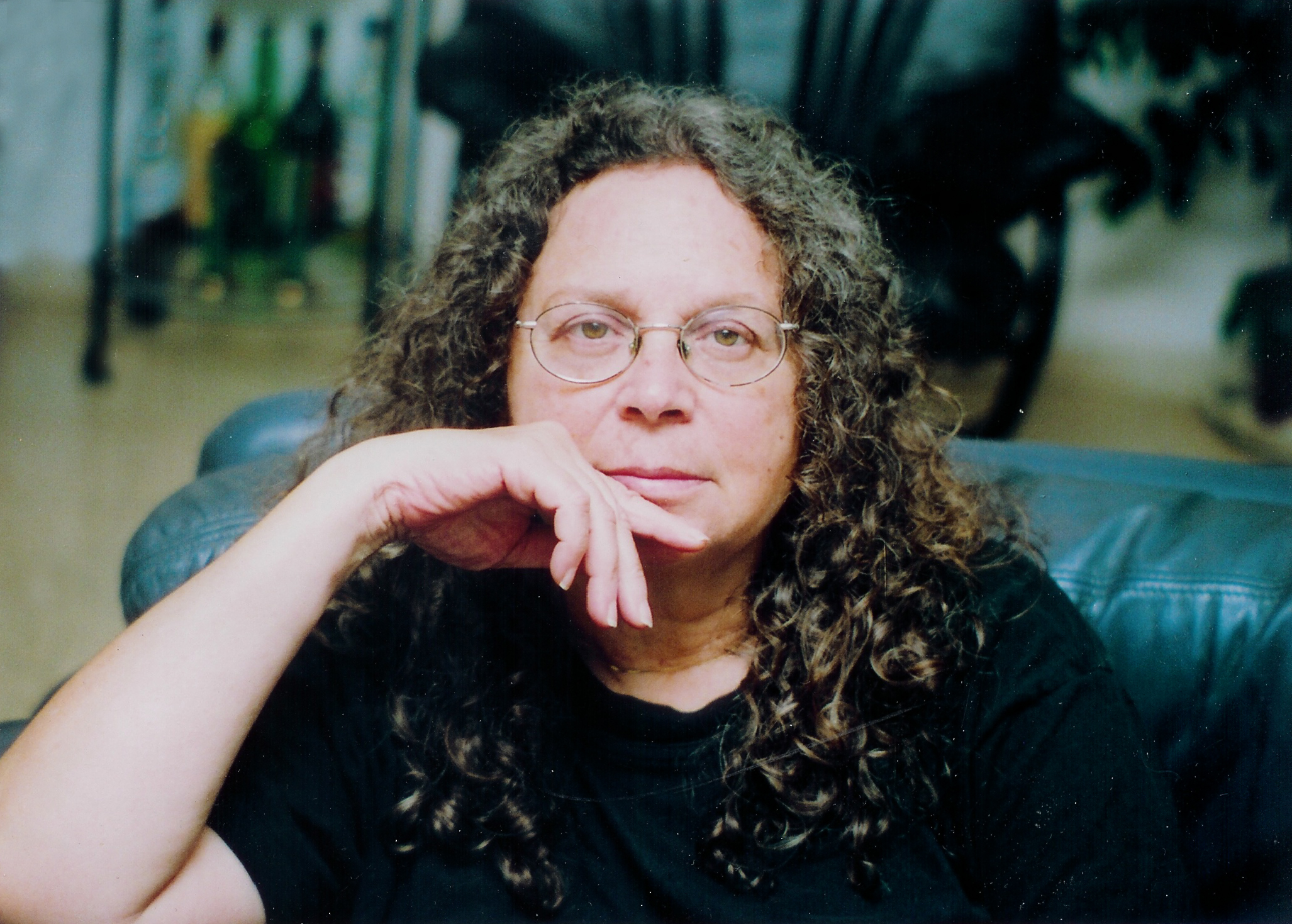
Erella Shadmi (Israel)

- Sarab Abu-Rabia-Queder (born 1976), Israeli-Arab sociologist specializing in gender studies
- Yael Dayan (born 1939), Israeli politician and writer, campaigner for human rights, women's rights and LGBT rights
- Hanna Herzog (fl. 1980s), Israeli sociologist pioneering women's and gender studies in Israel
- Tal Ilan (born 1956), Israeli historian, known for researching women's history in Judaism
- Erella Shadmi (fl. 1990s), Israeli sociologist and peace activist, head of the women and gender studies department at Beit Berl College

== Italy ==
- Elena Brambilla (1942–2018), Italian historian interested in the history of women and gender equality
- Saveria Chemotti (born 1947), Italian writer and researcher, focusing on culture and gender studies
- Souad Sbai (born 1961), Moroccan-born Italian politician and writer supporting the rights of Muslim women

== Jamaica ==
- Leith Dunn (fl. 2010s), Jamaican sociologist focusing on gender and human rights
- Lucille M. Mair (1924–2009), Jamaican diplomat and gender specialist, active in the United Nations
- Linnette Vassell (fl. 1976), Jamaican academic and feminist, advocating for gender equity and women's rights

== Japan ==
- Yasuko Muramatsu (born 1944), Japanese economist, president of Japan's Women's Learning Foundation
- Kanai Yoshiko (born 1944), Japanese academic and feminist theorist, an early participant in women's studies in Japan

== Kenya ==
- Achola Pala (fl. 1977), Kenyan anthropologist and women's policy specialist, promoter of research on African women undertaken by African women

== Lithuania ==
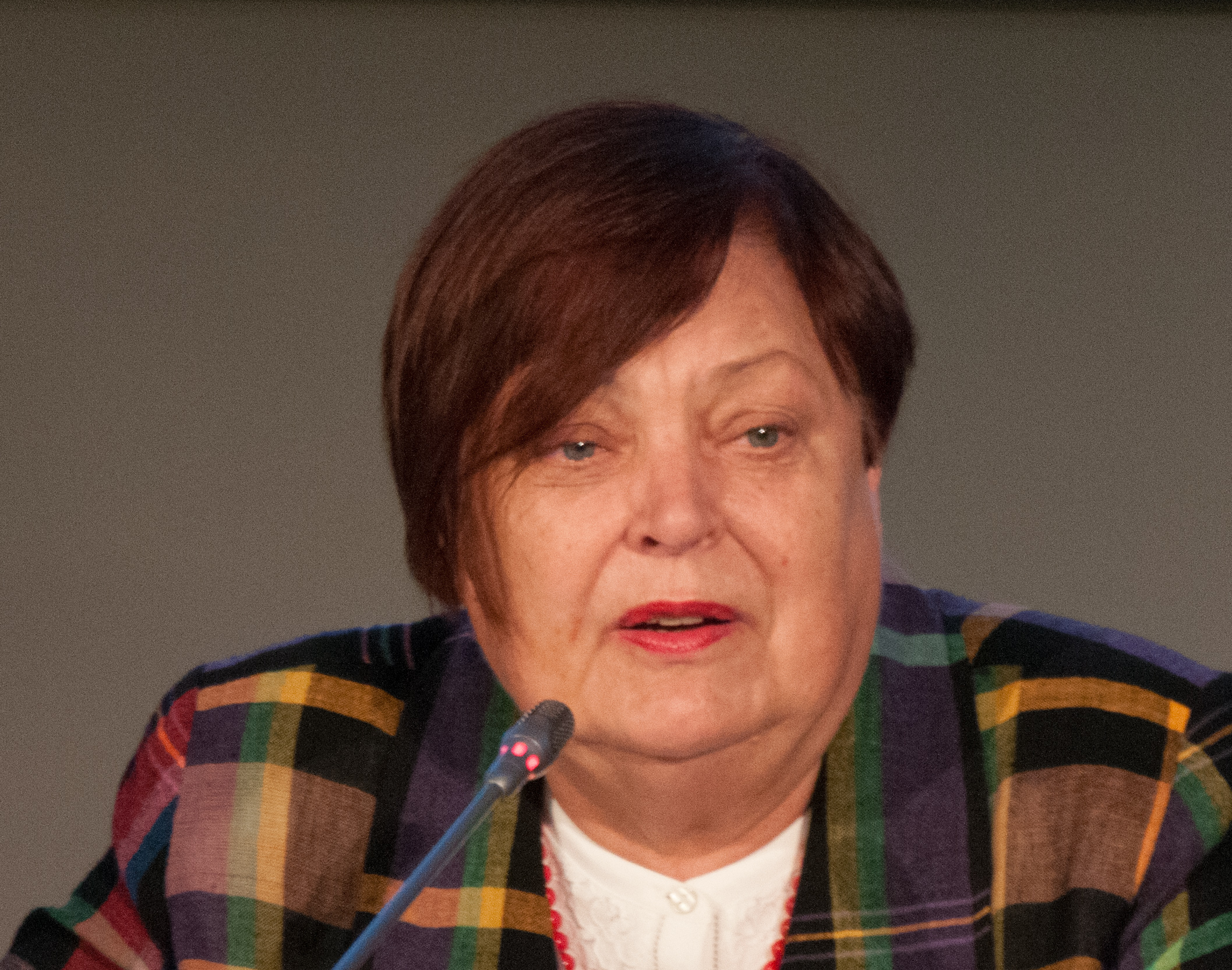
Giedrė Purvaneckienė (Lithuania)

- Giedrė Purvaneckienė (born 1945), Lithuanian politician and academic. co-founder of the Women's Studies Centre in Vilnius

== Mexico ==
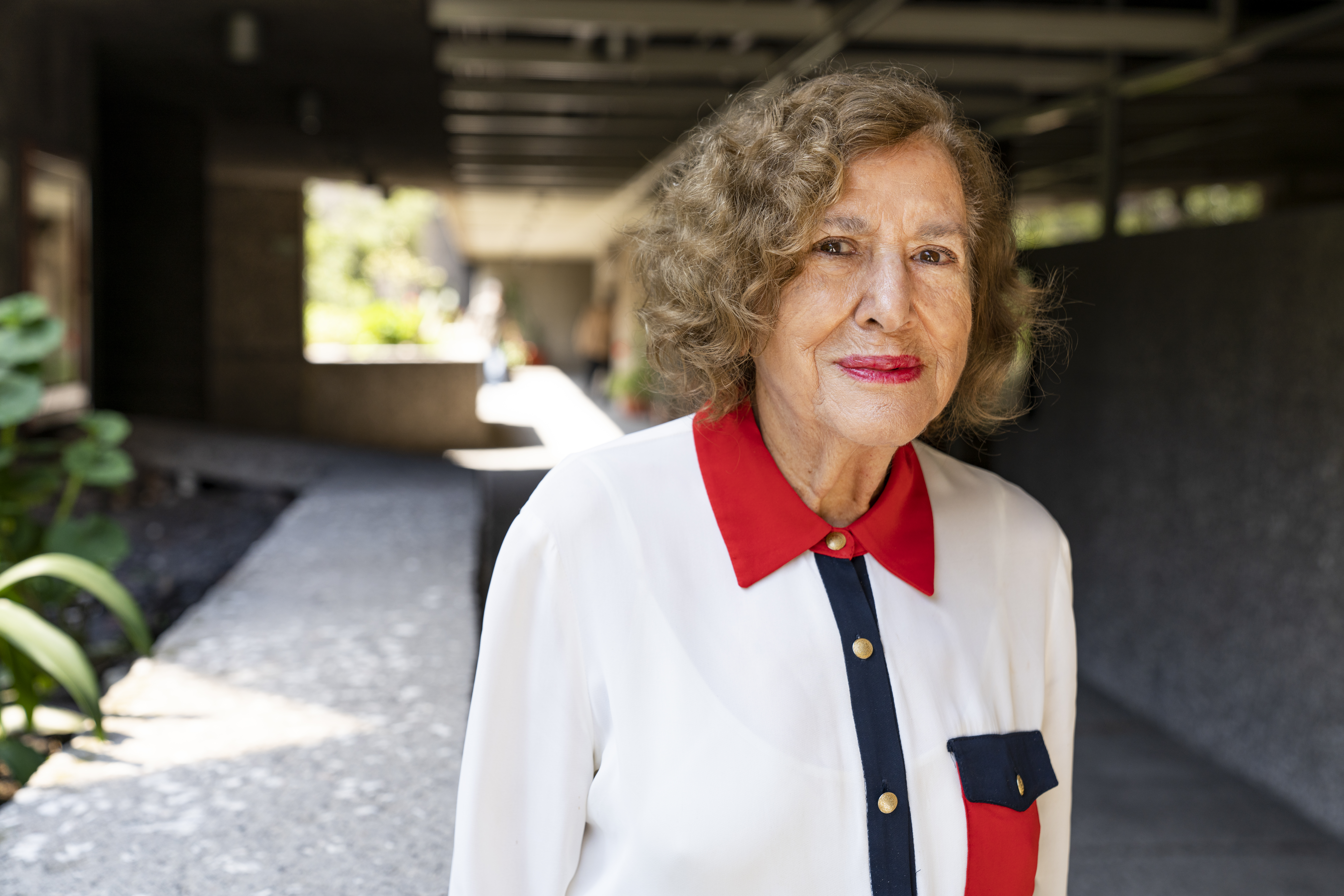
Flora Botton (Mexico)

- Gabriela Cano Ortega (fl. 1996), Mexican historian specializing in gender analysis at El Colegio de México
- Alicia Elena Pérez Duarte (born 1953), Mexican lawyer and researcher focusing on human rights and women's legal status
- Tania Reneaum (fl. 2014), Mexican human rights expert, executive secretary of the Inter-American Commission on Human Rights

== Moldova ==
- Valentina Bodrug-Lungu (born 1961), Moldovan gender studies scholar, pioneer of gender studies at Moldova State University

== Montenegro ==
- Mileva Filipović (1938–2020), Montenegrin sociologist, sought without success to establish a women's studies program at the University of Montenegro

== Netherlands ==
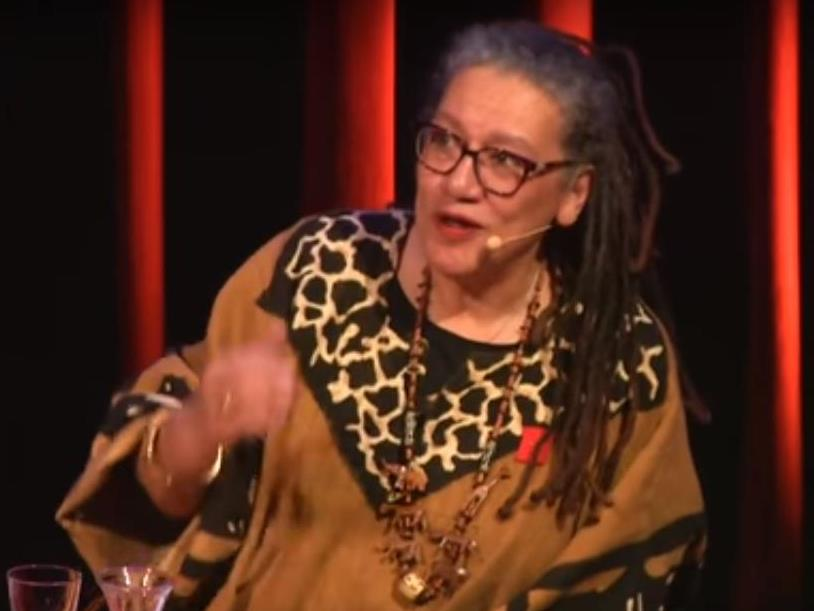
Gloria Wekker (Afro-Surinamese)

- Philomena Essed (born 1955), Surinamese-Dutch professor of race, gender and leadership at Antioch University Yellow Springs, Ohio
- Francisca de Haan (fl. 2002), former professor of gender studies and history
- Donny Meertens (born 1946), Dutch academic active in Colombia, co-founder of the Gender, Women and Development Studies Program at the National University of Colombia
- Joyce Outshoorn (born 1944), German political scientist, former head of the Women's Studies Department at Leiden University
- Gloria Wekker (born 1950), Afro-Surinamese Dutch academic, focusing on gender studies and sexuality in the Afro-Caribbean region

== New Zealand ==
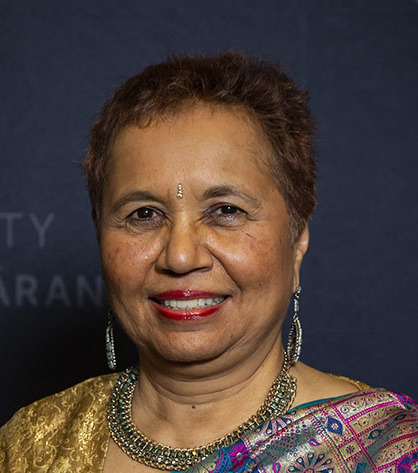
Edvina Pio (New Zealand)

- Virginia Braun (fl. 2000), New Zealand psychology academic specializing in thematic analysis and gender studies
- Lynda Johnston (born 1964), New Zealand geographer, active in researching feminist geography
- Sue Middleton (born 1947), New Zealand academic pioneering studies on women and education
- Edwina Pio (fl. 2007), New Zealand academic, active in diversity-related topics including gender issues and race relations

== Nigeria ==
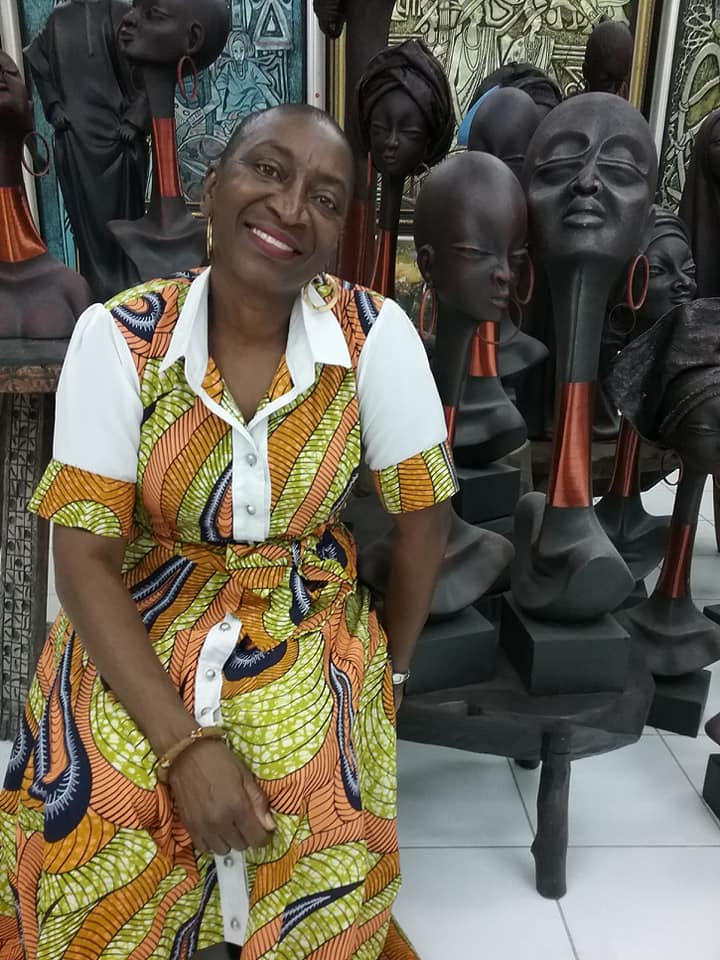
Olajumoke Yacob-Haliso (Nigeria)

- Angela Miri (born 1959), Nigerian academic active in English literature, gender studies and creative writing
- Dorcas Oluwade (fl. 2000s), Nigerian sociologist
- Oyèrónkẹ́ Oyěwùmí (born 1957), Nigerian gender scholar and specialist in African studies, professor of sociology at Stony Brook University, New York
- Mobolanle Ebunoluwa Sotunsa (fl. 2009), Nigerian academic, professor of gender studies at Babcock University
- Olajumoke Yacob-Haliso (fl. 2010s), Nigerian academic focusing on African women in post-conflict contexts, also addressing refugees, gender and politics

== Norway ==
- Agnes Bolsø (born 1953), Norwegian sociologist and expert on gender studies and sexuality, former director of the Norwegian Center for Gender Studies
- Berit Brandth (born 1947), Norwegian sociologist and gender researcher
- Tone Hellesund (born 1967), Norwegian ethnologist specializing in gender studies
- Elin Kvande (born 1951), Norwegian sociologist and gender researcher
- Elisabeth Lund Engebretsen (born 1923), Norwegian anthropologist and gender studies scholar at the University of Stavanger
- Eva Lundgren (born 1947), Norwegian sociologist and former academic at Sweden's Uppsala University, expert on violence against women and sexual violence
- Jorunn Økland (born 1964), Norwegian gender studies expert and biblical scholar, professor of gender studies at the University of Oslo
- May-Len Skilbrei (born 1971), Norwegian sociologist, criminologist and gender studies scholar
- Inger Skjelsbæk (born 1969), Norwegian gender studies scholar, professor of gender studies at the Centre for Gender Research in Oslo
- Suzanne Stiver Lie (1934–2018), American-born Norwegian women's rights activist and academic, developer of women's studies programs in Norway, Lithuania and Estonia

== Paraguay ==
- Graziella Corvalán (born 1931), Paraguayan sociologist and linguist, creator of one of the first women's studies programs in Paraguay

== Peru ==
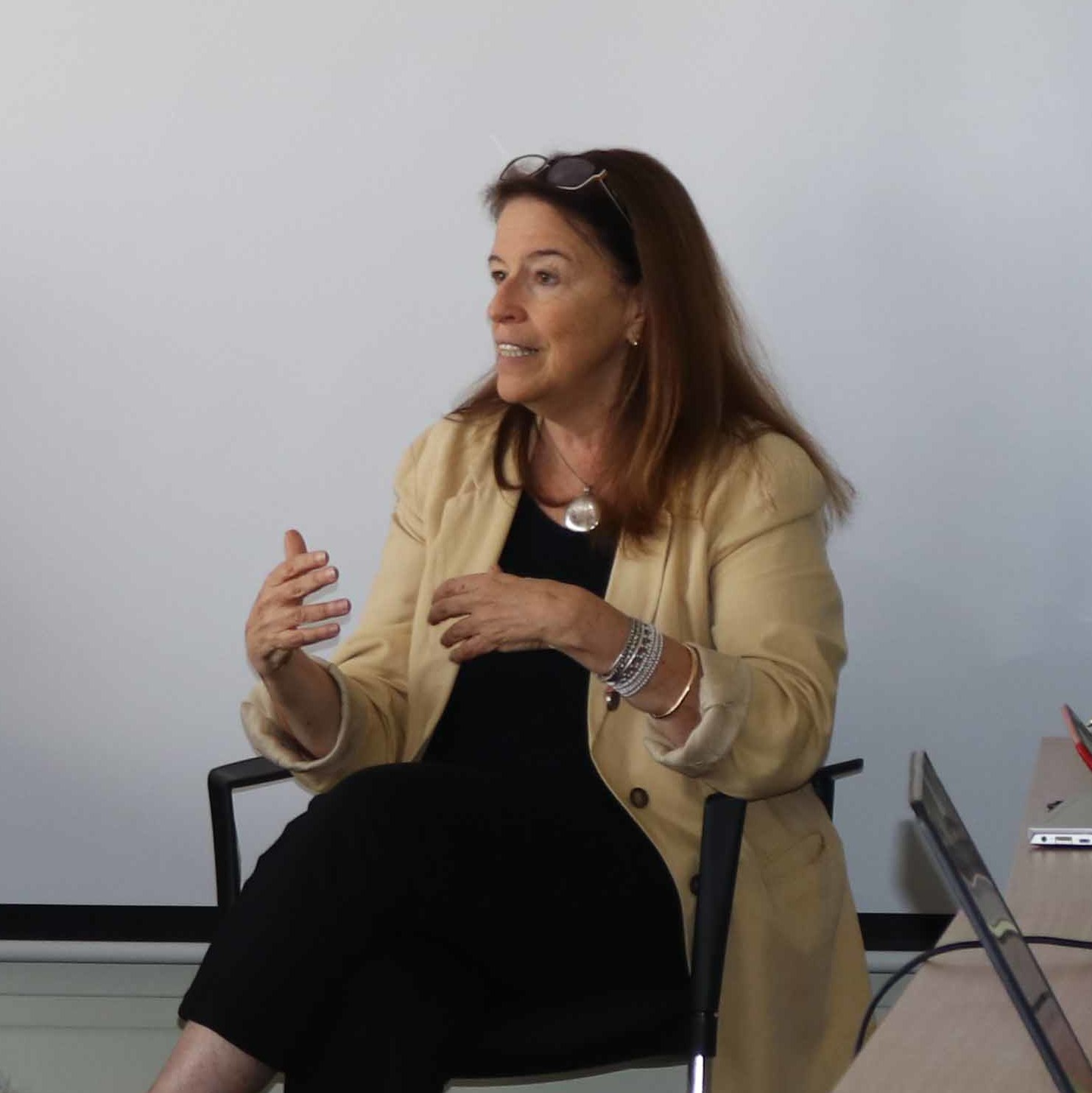
María Emma Mannerelli (Peru)

- María Emma Mannarelli (born 1954), Peruvian feminist and academic, founder of the gender studies program at the National University of San Marcos

== Portugal ==
- Teresa Joaquim (born 1954), Portuguese social anthropologist, coordinator of the women's studies program at Universidade Aberta
- Grada Kilomba (fl. 2008), Portuguese artist and writer, active in gender studies and decolonial feminism in German universities

== Romania ==
- Maria C. Buțureanu (1872–1919), Romanian educator, women's rights activist and prolific writer, pressing for women's complete emancipation

== Saudi Arabia ==
- Hala Al-Dosari (fl. 2018), Saudi women's acativist

== Senegal ==
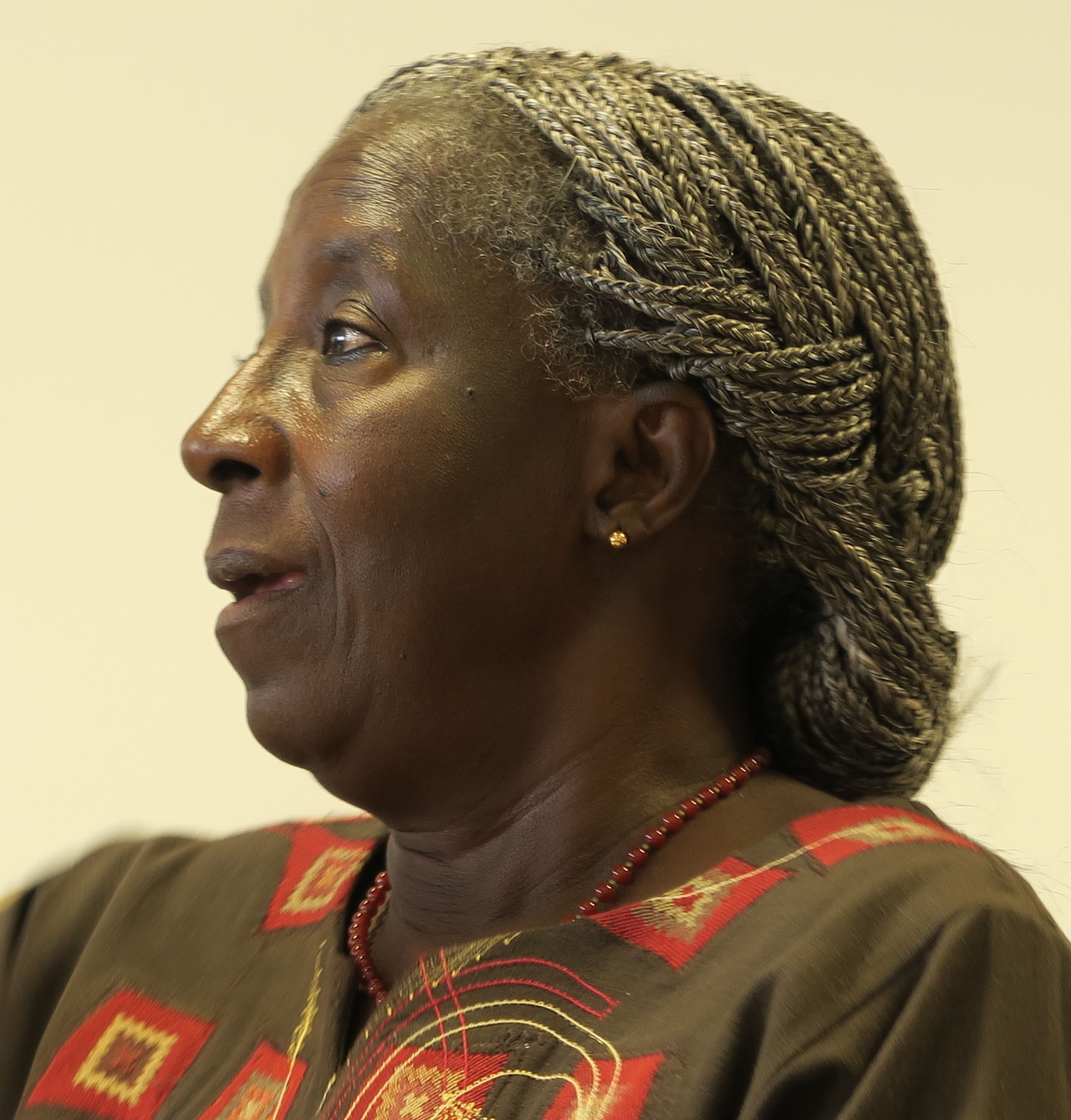
Fatou Sow (Senegal)

- Fatou Sow (born 1941), Senegalese feminist sociologist specializing in sociology of gender

== Serbia ==
- Marina Blagojević (1958–2020), Serbian sociologist, gender scholar and feminist, board member of the Women's Study Center in Belgrade
- Biljana Dojčinović (born 1963), Serbian feminist academic, founder of the Center for Women's Studies at the University of Belgrade
- Vera Kurtić (fl. 2010s), Serbian sociologist and feminist specializing in discrimination faced by Roma women, founder of the Roma Women's Network of Serbia

== Sierra Leone ==
- Filomina Clarice Steady, US-based Sierra Leonean academic participating in women's studies and as a UN advisor on women and gender

== South Africa ==
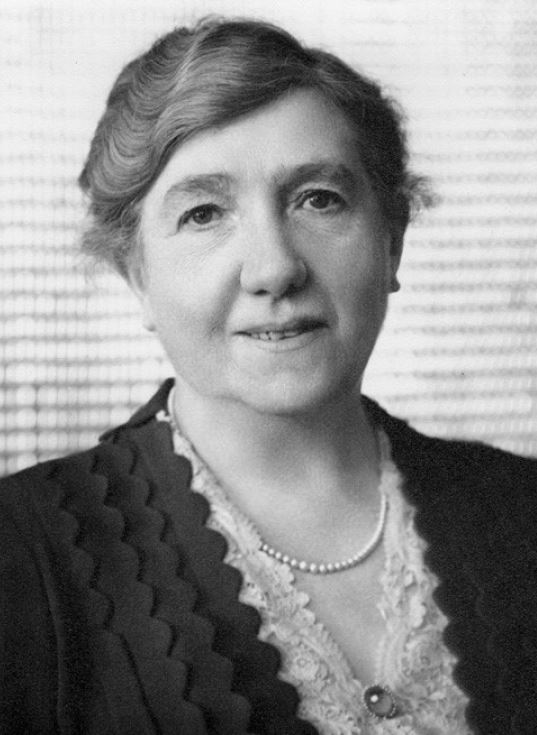
Winifred Hoernlé (South Africa)

- Winifred Hoernlé (1886–1960), South African anthropologist
- Elaine Salo (1962–2016), South African anthropologist specializing in gender studies and African feminism
- AnnMarie Wolpe (1930–2018), South African anti-apartheid activist and feminist

== South Korea ==
- Chung Young-ai (born 1955), South Korean academic and former government minister, specializing in social welfare at Seoul Cyber University, first Korean to hold a doctorate in women's studies

== Spain ==
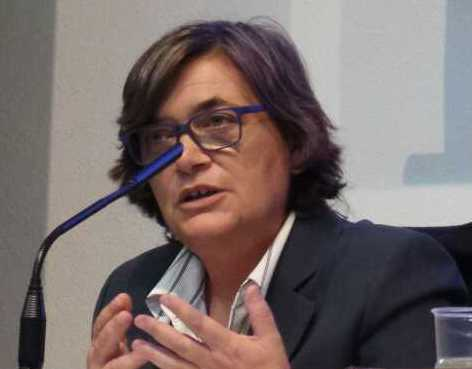
Alicia Miyares Fernández (Spain)

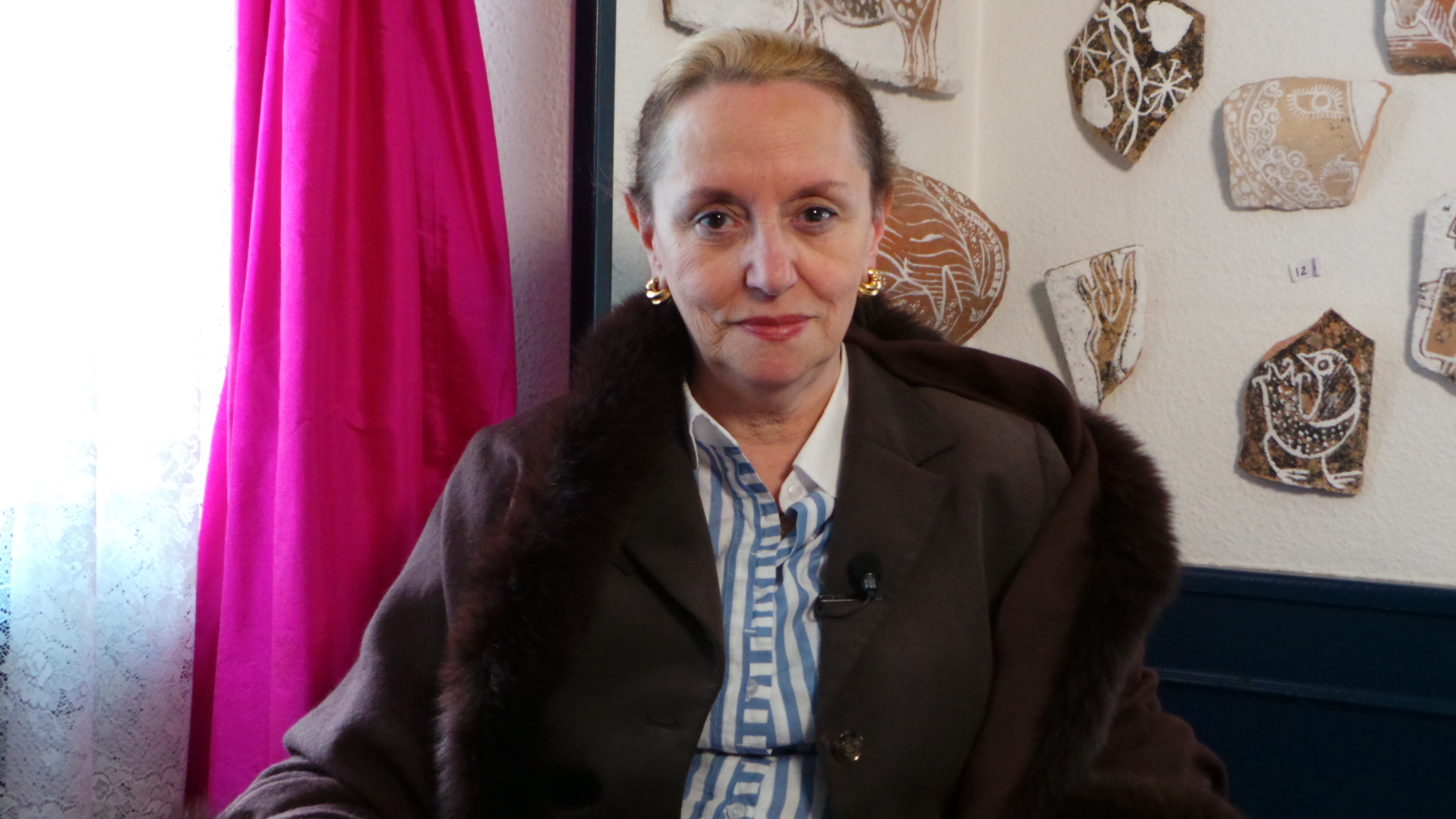
Amelia Valcárcel (Spain)

- Flora Botton (born 1933), Greek-born Spanish sociologist and gender studies scholar active in Nexico, co-founder of the gender studies program at El Colegio de México
- Mercedes Bengoechea (born 1952), Spanish feminist sociologist, active in the need to implement non-sexist use of language
- Margarita María Birriel Salcedo (born 1953), Spanish academic active in women's history and women's studies
- Montserrat Boix (born 1960), Spanish journalist, proponent of egalitarian journalism and the eradication of gender violence
- Rosa Cobo Bedía (born 1956), Spanish feminist, professor of sociology of gender
- Cecilia Castaño (born 1953), Spanish political scientist, researching the digital gender information gap and women's access to the information society at Complutense University
- María del Carmen García Herrero (born 1959), Spanish historian focusing on medieval women, co-coordinator of women's studies at the University of Zaragoza
- Alicia Miyares Fernández (born 1963), Spanish philosopher, feminist, researcher and women's rights activist
- Eulàlia Lledó (born 1952), Spanish schoolteacher specializing in sexism and gender violence in collaboration with universities and gender networks
- Laura Nuño Gómez (born 1967), Spanish political scientist and feminist, director of gender studies at King Juan Carlos University
- Miren Ortubay Fuentes (born 1958), Spanish criminologist at the University of the Basque Country specializing in gender-related violence
- Marta Segarra (born 1963), Spanish philologist and academic, CNRS researcher in gender and sexuality
- Amelia Valcárcel (born 1950), Spanish philosopher and feminist, active in moral values and women's rights

== Sweden ==
- Margot Bengtsson (born 1943), Swedish psychologist known for her research in social, feminist and critical psychology, especially gender, power, identity and social class
- Boel Berner (born 1945), Swedish sociologist and historian, researching women, peace and security policy
- Maud Eduards (born 1944), Swedish political scientist and gender studies scholar
- Asta Ekenvall (1913–2001), Swedish librarian, founder of the Swedish Women's History Archive
- Eva Gothlin (1957–2006), Swedish historian of ideas
- Yvonne Hirdman (born 1943), Swedish historian and gender researcher
- Gunhild Kyle (1921–2016), Swedish historian, professor of women's history
- Hjördis Levin (born 1930), Swedish historian active in research on gender studies
- Lisbeth Larsson (1949–2021), Swedish literary historian focusing on gender studies at the University of Gothenburg
- Rosa Malmström (1906–1995), Swedish feminist active in the development of the Swedish Women's Historical Collection now known as KvinnSam
- Eva Pineus (1905–1985), Swedish politician, librarian and women's rights activist, founder of the Swedish women's historical literature archive KvinnSam
- Nina Rung (born 1981), Swedish feminist and anti-domestic violence activist

== Switzerland ==
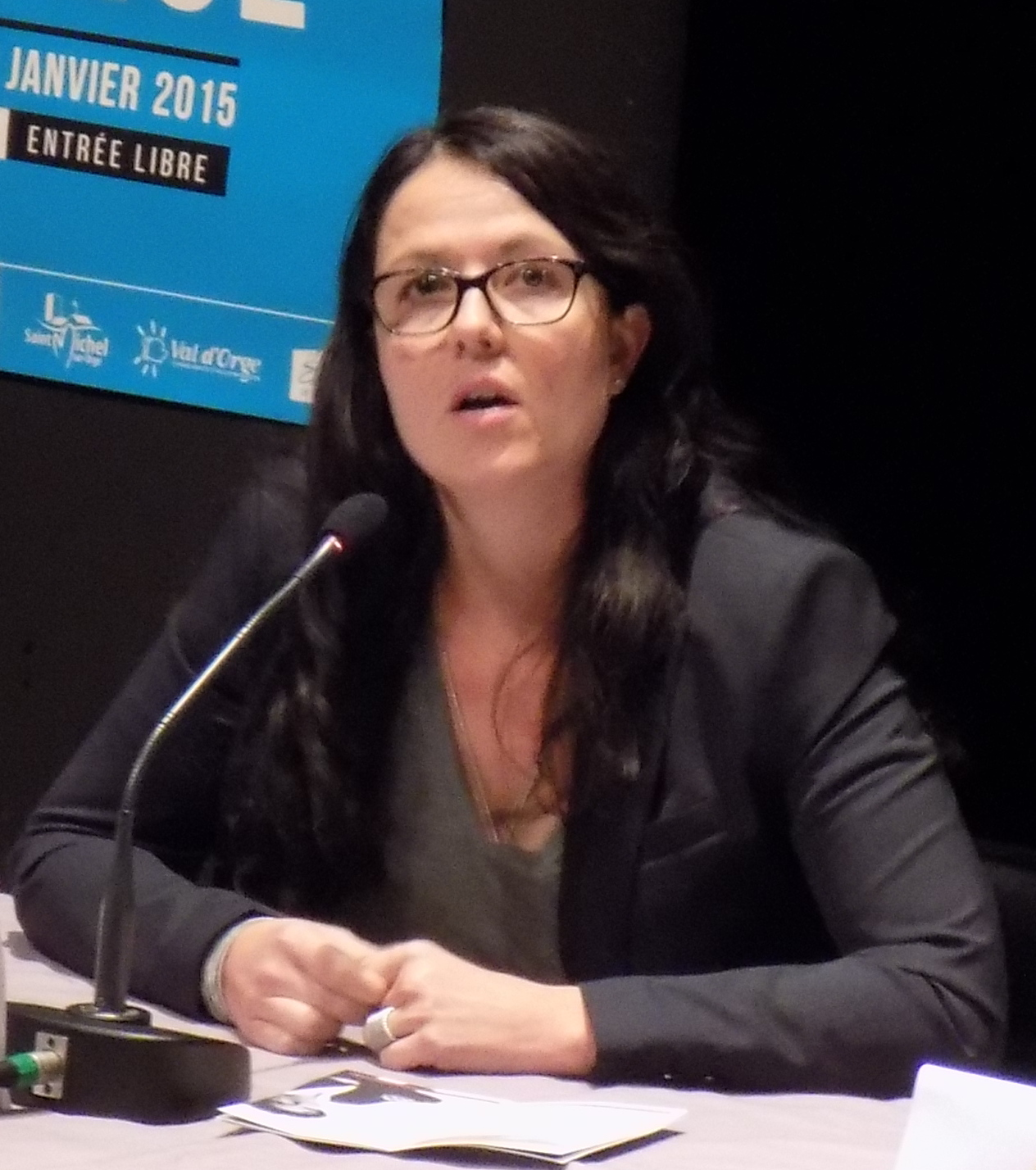
Caroline Dayer (Switzerland)

- Caroline Dayer (born 1978), Swiss feminist researcher, specializing in gender studies, expert on homophobia, sexism and street harassment
- Patricia Roux (fl. 1996), Swiss sociologist and feminist, first Swiss professor of gender studies
- Franziska Schutzbach (born 1978), Swiss sociologist and gender researcher, focusing on reproductive policies, gender relations and anti-feminism

== Taiwan ==
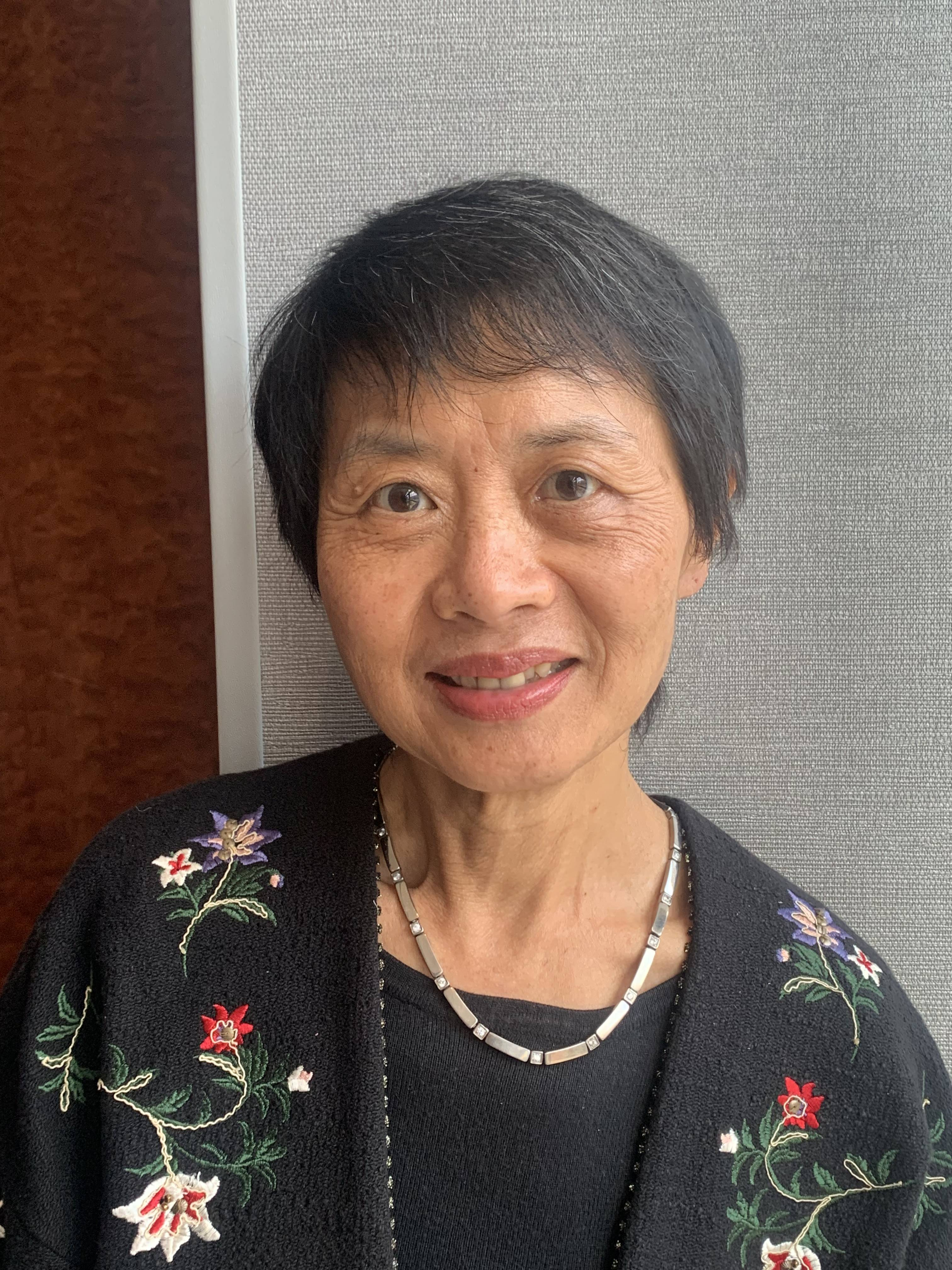
Yi-Chun Tricia Lin (Taiwan)

- Yi-Chun Tricia Lin (fl. 2000s), Taiwanese feminist scholar, director of the Southern Connecticut State University's program on women's gender and sexuality

== Trinidad and Tobago ==
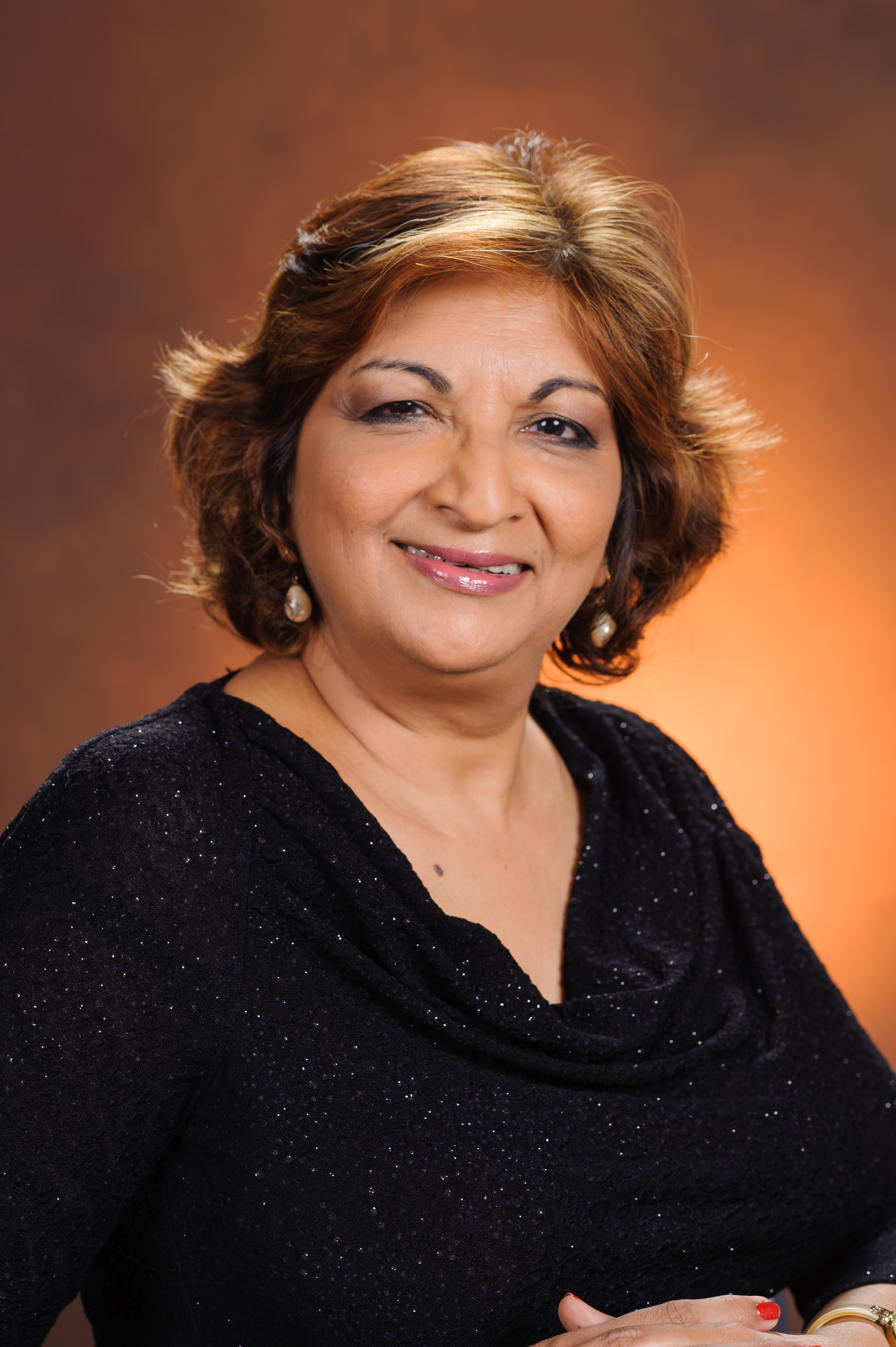
Patricia Mohammed (Trinidad)

- Patricia Mohammed (born 1954), Trinidadian scholar interested in gender development and Caribbean art, founder of Caribbean Review of Gender Studies

== Tunisia ==
- Mounira M. Charrad (born 1942), Franco-Tunisian sociologist focusing on political sociology and gender politics at the University of Texas at Austin

== Turkey ==
- Feride Acar (born 1948), Turkish expert on women and gender, founding chair of the Middle East Technical University's gender and women's studies program
- Ayşe Gül Altınay (fl. 2001), Turkish academic at Sabancı University focusing on anthropology, cultural studies and gender studies

== Uganda ==
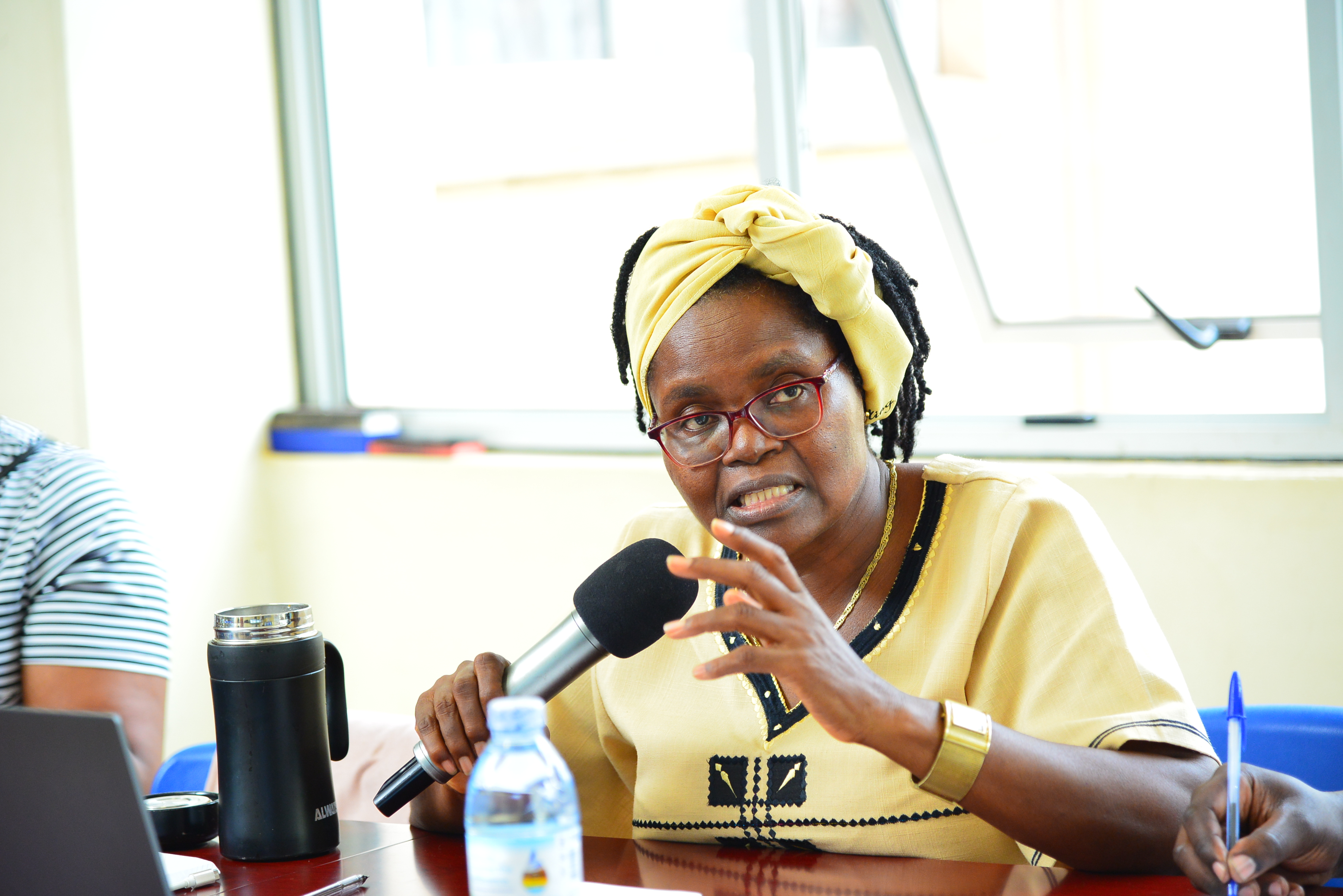
Consolata Kabonesa (Uganda)

- Christine Butegwa (fl. 2000), Ugandan feminist and gender activist, interested in women's rights, gender and development, and communications
- Consolata Kabonesa (fl. 1990s), Ugandan gender academic at the School of Women and Gender at Makerere University
- Deborah Kasente (fl. 2000s), Ugandan writer and academic, co-founded of the School of Women and Gender Studies at Makerere University

== Ukraine ==
- Vira Ageyeva (born 1958), Ukrainian philologist, co-founder of the Kyiv Institute for Gender Studies
- Kateryna Antonovych (1884–1975). Ukrainian artist and academic, active in women's and community organizations
- Tamara Hundorova (born 1955), Ukrainian culturologist, one of the pioneers of women's studies in Ukraine
- Maria Mayerchyk (born 1971), Ukrainian feminist academic interested in diapora, feminism, folklore, sexuality and queer studies
- Olga Plakhotnik (fl. 2012), Canada-based Ukrainian social philosopher focusing on feminism and queer studies
- Tamara Martsenyuk (born 1981), Ukrainian sociologist specializing in gender studies
- Solomiia Pavlychko (1958–1999), Ukrainian philosopher and feminist, pioneering scholar introducing gender studies in Ukraine
- Irina Zherebkina (born 1959), Ukrainian feminist academic, director of the Kharkiv Centre for Gender Studies

== United Kingdom ==
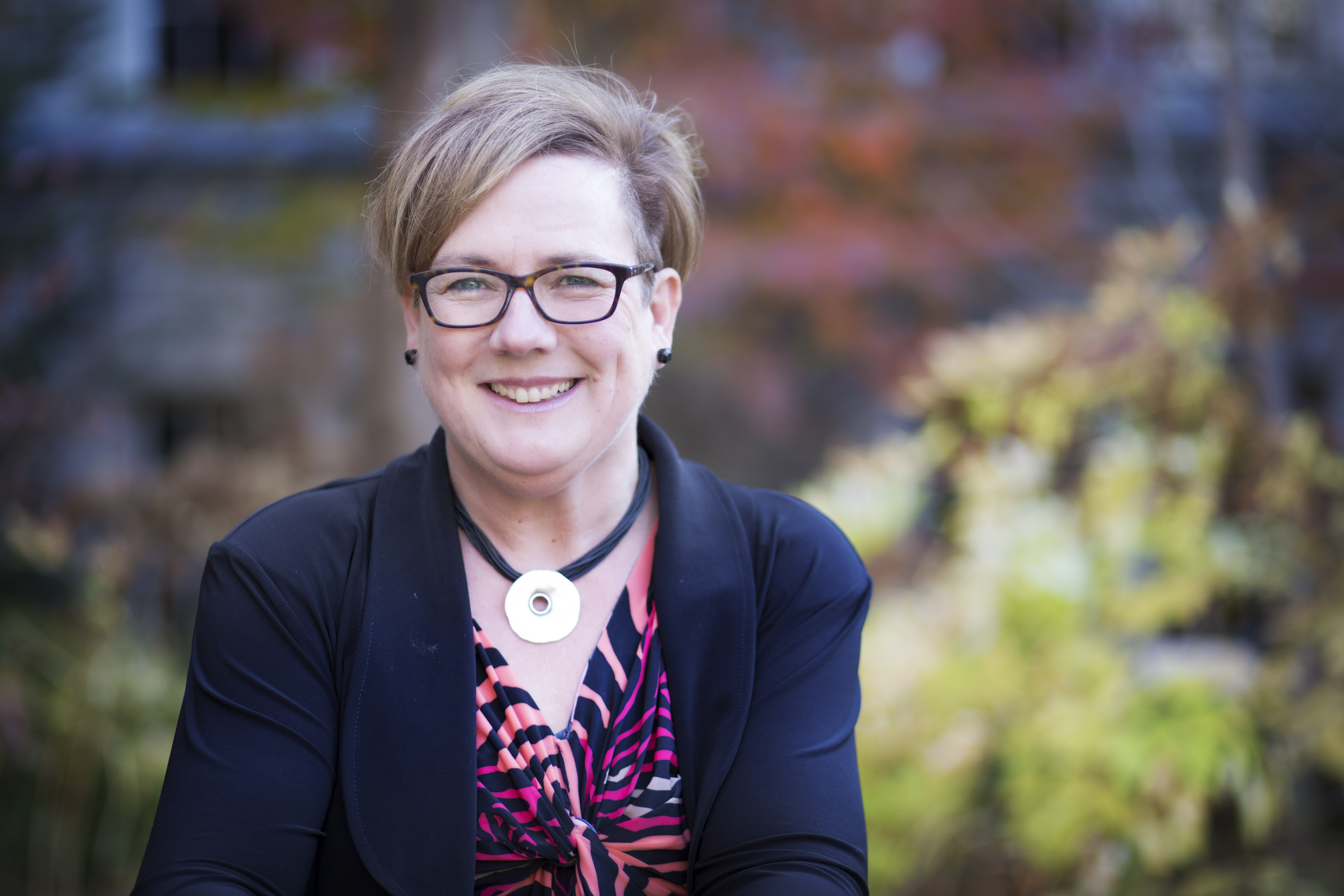
Samantha Brennan (UK)

- Liz Bird (1945–2021), British academic, co-founding member of the British Women's Studies Group
- Eliza Bostock (1817–1898), British promoter of women's education
- Samantha Brennan (fl. 2000s), British philosopher and scholar of women's studies at the University of Guelph
- Adelina Broadbridge (fl. 2001), British academic specializing in retailing and gender in management, editor-in-chief of Gender in Management
- Lynne Brydon (fl. 1978), British social scientist specializing in gender studies, senior research fellow in African studies at the University of Birmingham
- Hazel Carby (born 1948), British born academic active in the United States, focusing on race, gender and sexuality in Caribbean culture
- Cynthia Carter (born 1959), British writer and feminist. former chair of the Feminist Scholarship Division of the International Communication Association
- Sarah Childs (born 1969), British academic, chair of politics and gender at the University of Edinburgh
- Sarah Colvin (born 1967), British scholar specializing in German literary theory and gender studies at the University of Cambridge
- Catherine Eschle (fl. 1999), British political scientist, researching feminism, intersectionality and gender politics
- Jill Liddington (born 1946), British writer and academic specializing in women's history
- Lesley McMillan (fl. 2000s), professor of criminology and sociology at Glasgow Caledonian University, researching gender-based violence and criminal justice systems
- Laura Mulvey (born 1941), British feminist film theorist, professor of film and media studies at Birkbeck, University of London
- Felicity Nussbaum (born 1944), American academic at the University of California, Los Angeles, with an interest in gender studies and 18th-century literature
- Christine Oppong (fl. 1980), British academic at the Institute of African Studies, formerly research anthropologist and adviser in gender, population and development at the ILO, Geneva
- Jane Pilcher (fl. 1990s), British sociologist specializing in gender studies, including names, gender and ageing
- Diana Paton (born 1969), British historian, specializing in the Caribbean including gender history, professor of history at the University of Edinburgh
- Alison Phipps (fl. 2000s), British political sociologist, gender studies scholar and gender theorist at Newcastle University
- Emma L. E. Rees (fl. 2010s), British academic and writer, professor of English and gender studies at the University of Chester
- Elizabeth Jesser Reid (1789–1866), English social reformer active in promoting higher education for women
- Alexandra Shepard (fl. 2003), British academic, professor of gender history at the University of Glasgow

== United States ==
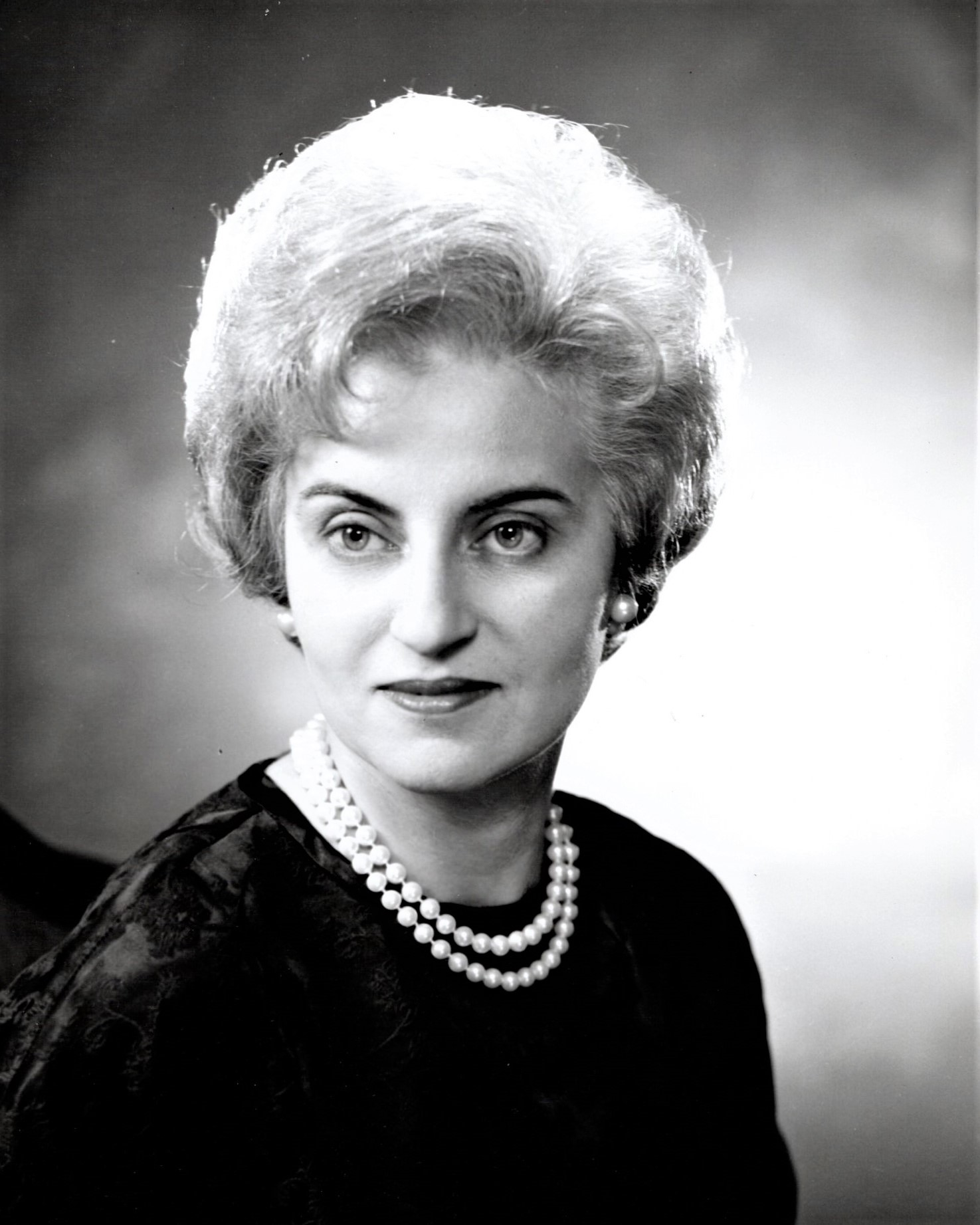
Annette K. Baxter (United States)

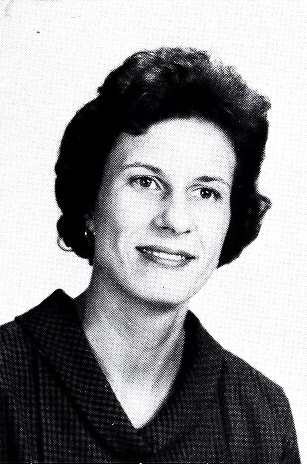
Mollie C. Davis (United States)

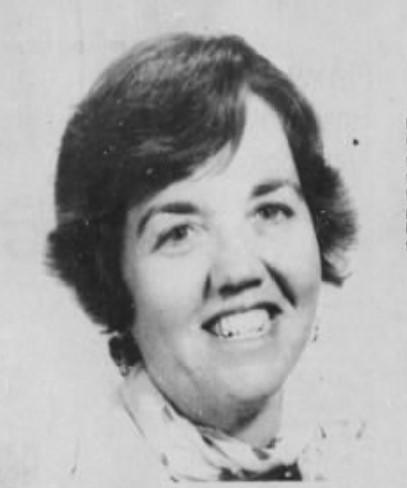
Myra Dinnerstein (United States)

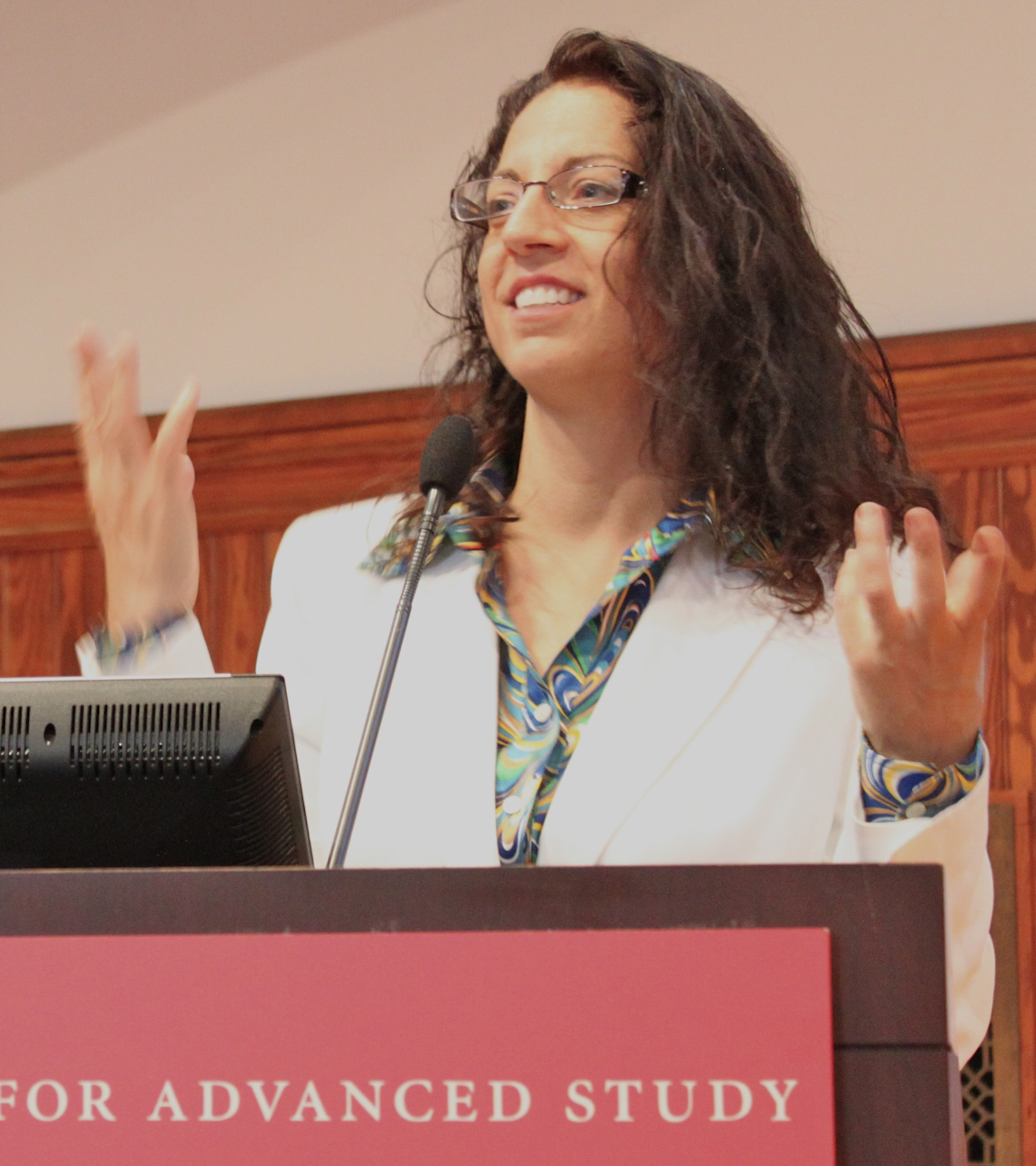
Kristen Ghodsee

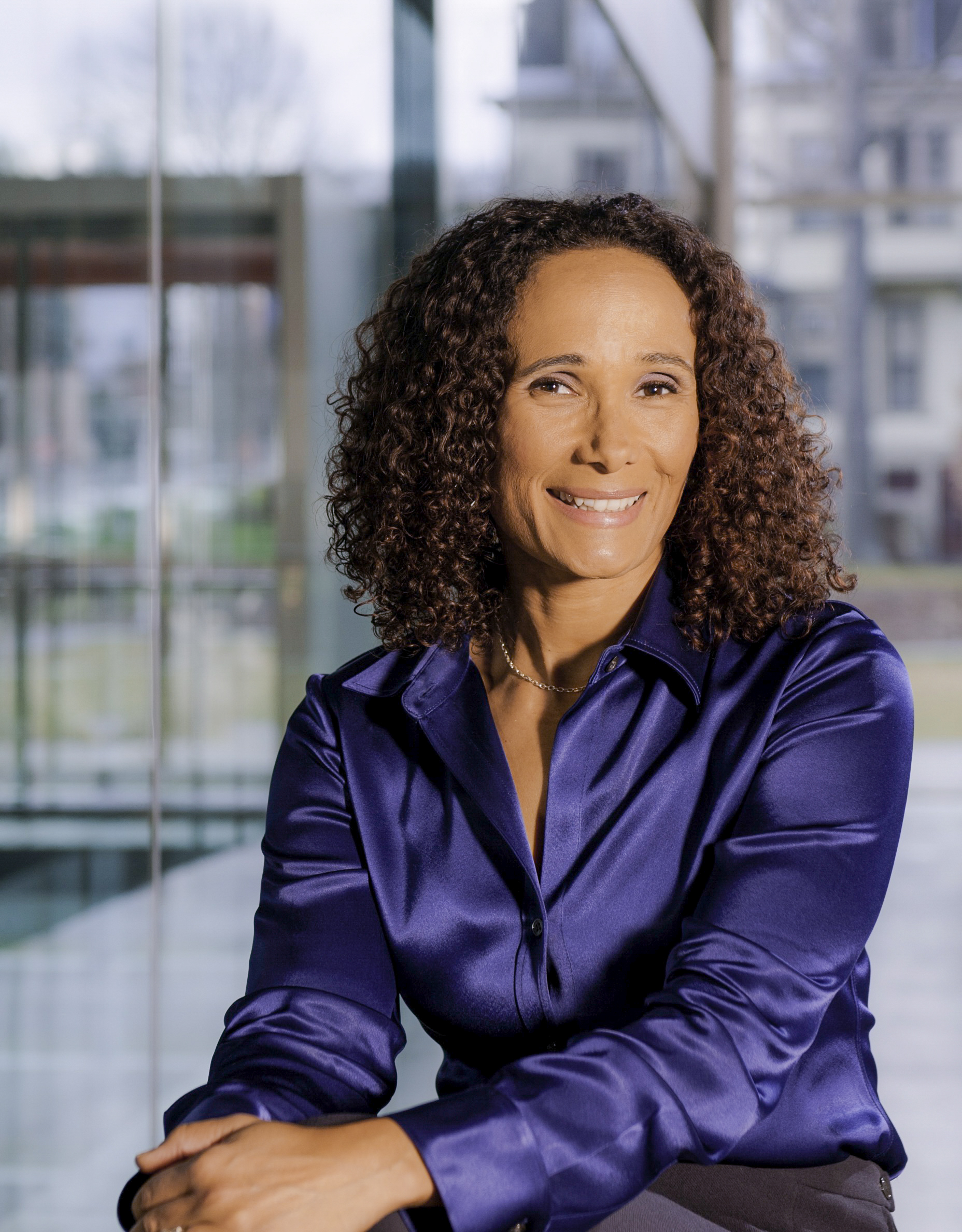
Tricia Rose (United States)

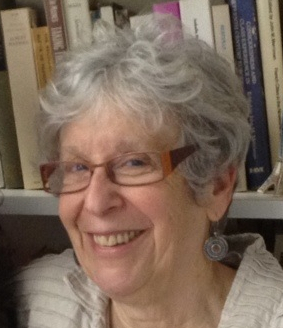
Joan Wallach Scott (United States)

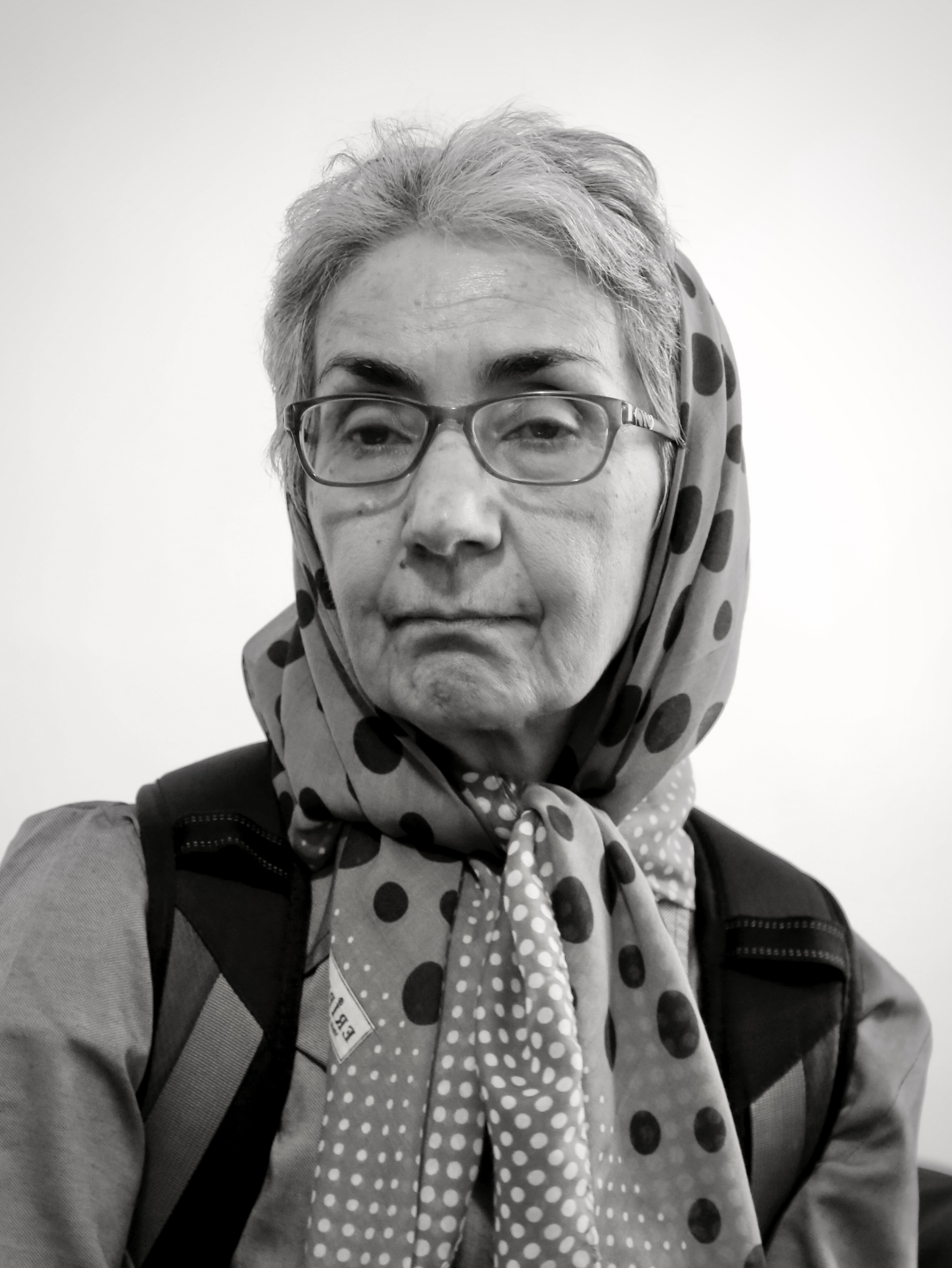
Afsaneh Najmabadi (Iran/United States)

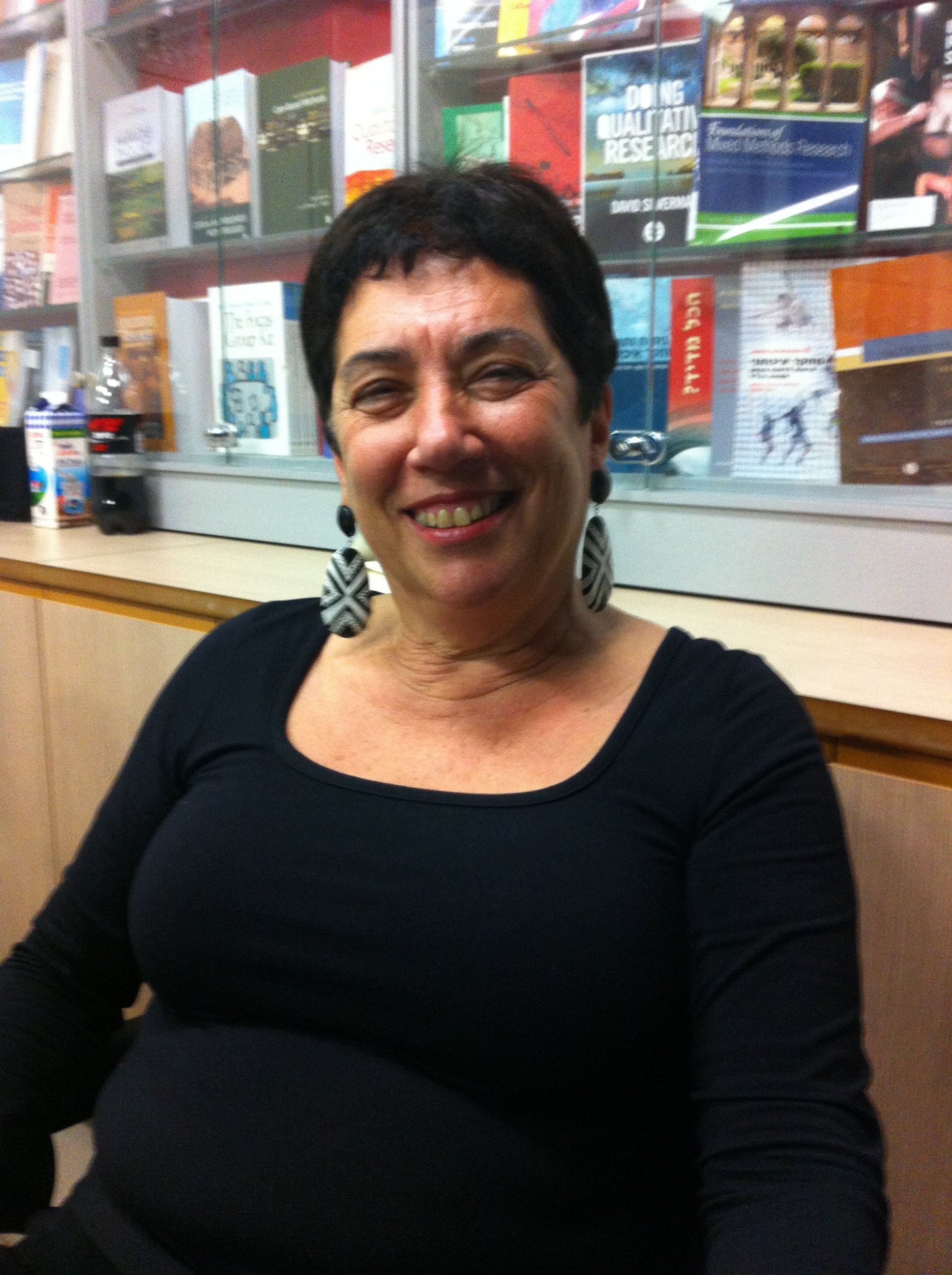
Shulamit Reinharz (Netherlands/United States)

- Lina AbiRafeh (fl. 2008), Arab-American feminist focused on gender issues, former director of the Arab Institute for Women at the Lebanese American University
- Nwando Achebe (born 1970), Nigerian-American academic and feminist focusing on West African History, gender and sexuality
- Shauna Adix (1932–1998), American academic, founder of the Women's Resource Center at the University of Utah
- Christine Garside Allen, (born 1940) co-founder of the women's studies program at Sir George Williams University in Montreal, Quebec
- Elizabeth R. Baer (born 1946), American academic specializing in women's and Holocaust studies
- Aimee Bahng (fl. 2010), American academic, professor of gender and women's studies at Pomona College, California
- Tani E. Barlow (fl. 1994), American historian and women studies academic, known for researching feminism in China
- Annette Kar Baxter (1926–1983), American women's history academic, taught early women's history class at Barard College
- Susan Groag Bell (1926–2015), Czech-American pioneer in women's studies
- Sandra Bem (1944–2014), American psychologist known for her interest in androgyny and gender studies
- Margarita Benítez (born 1949), Puerto Rican educator and academic, founder of Puerto Rico's first women's study program
- Donna Boutelle (1931–2008), American historian, president of the West Coast Association of Women Historians
- Ana J. Bridges (fl. 2007), American psychologist at the University of Arkansas, co-editor of Sexualization, Media, and Society
- Marilyn J. Boxer (born 1930), American historian, early contributor to women's studies at San Diego State University
- Christia Brown (fl. 2003), American psychologist researching gender and ethnic discrimination
- Joan Jacobs Brumberg (born 1944), American social historian specializing in women's history and medical history, former academic at Cornell University in women's studies and human development
- Judith Butler (born 1958), American philosopher and gender studies scholar, known for her interest in third-wave feminism, queer theory and literary theory
- Rebecca Campbell (born 1969), American psychologist, researching sexual assault and violence against women at Michigan State University
- Tina Campt (fl. 1996), American academic at Princeton University, women's studies researcher with a special interest in Afro-Germans
- Silvia Sara Canetto (fl. 1977), American psychologist and academic, researching diversity issues including gender and sexual orientation
- Berenice A. Carroll (1932–2018), American political scientist specializing in peace and conflict studies, feminist theory and women's studies
- Jane Chance (born 1945), American scholar, formerly specializing in English literature and gender studies at Rice University
- Eliza Lo Chin (born 1967), American academic specializing in women's health, director of the American Medical Women's Association
- Norma Chinchilla (born 1945), American sociologist, founder of women's studies program at the University of California, Irvine and a specialist on Central America
- Nancy Chodorow (born 1944), American sociologist, academic and writer, active in women's studies and recognized for her interest in feminist thought
- Janine Austin Clayton (fl. 2000s), American ophthalmologist research women's health at the National Institutes of Health
- Carol Cohn (fl. 1987), American academic, founding director of the Consortium on Gender, Security and Human Rights and lecturer at the University of Massachusetts
- Mollie C. Davis (1932–2021), American activist and academic promoting women's studies programs
- Jeannine Davis-Kimball (1929–2017), American archaeologist specializing in gender studies
- Carmen Diana Deere (born 1945), American feminist economist, expert on gender in Latin American development
- Linda Grant DePauw (born 1940), American modern historian pioneering women's research
- Myra Dinnerstein (born 1934), American academic, founding director of the women's studies program at the University of Arizona
- Peggy Dobbins (born 1938), offered a women's study course in New Orleans in 1966
- Zillah Eisenstein (fl. 1972), American political theorist and gender studies scholar, specializing in feminist theory, class, sex and race politics
- Tanya Erzen (fl. 2000s), American academic specializing in religion, gender and queer studies at the University of Puget Sound
- Mary Dockray-Miller (born 1965), American scholar of early medieval England at Lesley University, known for work on female saints and religious women
- Anne Fausto-Sterling (born 1944), American sexologist, specializing in the social construction of gender, sexual identity, gender roles and intersexuality
- Martha Feldman (born 1954), American musicologist and cultural historian, also interested in gender and sexuality
- Yael Feldman (born 1941), American cultural historian researching feminist Hebrew literary criticism and active in gender studies
- Myra Marx Ferree (born 1949), American sociologist, formerly associated with European studies and women's studies at the University of Wisconsin-Madison
- Terri Fisher (fl. 1988), American psychologist specializing in human sexuality and gender stereotypes
- Joanne Frye (born 1944), American academic, former professor of English and Women's Studies at the College of Wooster
- Theresa Geller (fl. 2004), American academic specializing in film theory and gender studies
- Carol Gilligan (born 1938), American feminist and ethicist, interested in women's psychology and girl's development
- Kristen Ghodsee (born 1970), American ethnographer specializing in post-socialist gender studies
- Thavolia Glymph (fl. 1994), American historian specializing in African-American history and women's history at Duke University
- Claudia Goldin (born 1946), American economic historian noted for her research into the women's labor market
- Linda Haas (born 1950), American sociologist, former researcher focusing on gender, family policy and labor at the University of Wisconsin-Madison
- Mary S. Hartman (born 1941), American academic, former director of the Women's Studies Institute at Rutgers University
- Marcia Herndon (1941–1997), American ethnomusicologist with an interest in music, gender and culture
- Barbara Hillyer (1934–2024), American academic and feminist activist, founding director of women's studies courses at the University of Oklahoma
- Sarah Hoagland (born 1945), American philosopher, former professor of women's studies at Northeastern Illinois University
- Janet L. Jacobs (born 1948), American sociologist specializing in gender and religion and the social psychology of gender
- Cheryl Johnson-Odim (fl. 1978), American historian, specializing in women's history
- Jennifer A. Johnson (fl. 2004), American sociologist, one of the chief editors of Sexualization, Media and Society
- Katrina Karkazis (born 1970), American anthropologist, professor of sexuality, women's and gender studies at Amherst College
- AnaLouise Keating (born 1961), American academic, professor of multicultural women's and gender studies at Texas Women's University
- Rosemary Keefe (1940–2012), American nun pioneering the women's studies program at Rollins College in Florida
- Monika Kehoe (1909–2012), American linguist and ESL specialist who founded the women's studies program at the University of Guam
- Kamala Kempadoo (fl. 1990s), British-Guyanese writer and academic, specializing in sexology research
- Mirra Komarovsky (1905–1999), American pioneer in the sociology of gender
- Treva Lindsey, American academic, Professor of Women's, Gender, and Sexuality Studies at the Ohio State University
- Marlene Longenecker (1945–2014), American academic, director of Ohio State University's Center for Women's Studies
- Zella Luria (1924–2018), American psychologist and feminist known for her work on the development of gender identity and sexuality
- Louise Ropes Loomis (1874–1958), American historian, cofounder of the Berkshire Conference of Women Historians
- Lynn Mahoney (born 1964), American academic historian focusing on women's history, feminism, race studies, and ethnicity
- Harriet Malinowitz (fl. 1990), American academic in gender studies at Ithaca College
- Elizabeth A. McAlister (fl. 1996), American scholar of African-American and gender studies at Wesleyan University
- Susan McClary (born 1946), American musicologist and feminist, noted for her work on feminist music criticism at Case Western Reserve University
- Durba Mitra (fl. 2013), American academic specializing in feminist studies at Harvard University
- Lisa Jean Moore (born 1967), professor of sociology and gender studies at the State University of New York
- Joyce Mushaben (born 1952), director of the Institute for Women's and Gender Studies at the University of Missouri–St. Louis from 2002 to 2005
- Premilla Nadasen (fl. 2005), American historian specializing in the histories of women of color, former president of the National Women's Studies Association
- Serena Nanda (born 1938), American anthropologist
- Carol Nagy Jacklin (1939–2011), American psychologist and gender scholar at the University of Southern California
- Afsaneh Najmabadi (born 1946), Iranian-born American historian and gender theorist at Harvard University
- Marysa Navarro (born 1933), Spanish-American historian specializing in the history of feminism and Latin American women
- Connie Newman (fl. 1978), American endocrinologist, former president of the American Medical Women's Association
- Vivien Ng (fl. 1976), American historian, chair of the University at Albany, SUNY's Department of Women's, Gender & Sexuality Studies, former president of the National Women's Studies Association
- Lizabeth Paravisini-Gebert (born 1953), Puerto-Rican philosopher researching the contributions of Caribbean women
- Carolyn C. Perrucci (fl. 1960s), American sociologist specializing in gender roles, family and education
- Catherine M. Prelinger (1925–1991), American historian, president of the Berkshire Conference of Women Historians
- Priti Ramamurthy (fl. 1991), American political economist, professor of gender, women and sexuality studies at the University of Washington
- Janice Raymond (born 1943), American lesbian feminist, former professor of women's studies and medical ethics at the University of Massachusetts Amherst
- Shulamit Reinharz, Dutch-born American academic, headling women's studies program
- Luana Ross (born 1949), Native American sociologist in gender, women and sexuality studies at the University of Washington
- Joan Wallach Scott (born 1941), American historian of France with contributions in gender history and gender theory
- Hilda L. Smith (1941–2023), American historian specializing in gender analysis of political theory at the University of Cincinnati
- Barbara Miller Solomon (1919–1992), American historian, taught the first course on American women at Harvard University
- Gwendolyn T. Sorell (1938–2009). American academic specializing in human development and family studies at Texas Tech University
- Margaret Strobel (born 1946), American academic specializing in African studies, former head of women's studies at the University of Illinois Chicago
- M. Elizabeth Tidball (1929–2014), American physiologist advocating for women in academia and STEM
- Nayereh Tohidi (born 1951), Iranian-born American professor, former chair of gender and women's studies at California State University
- Tricia Rose (born 1962), American sociologist and writer, researching the intersectionality of pop music and gender at Brown University
- Penny A. Weiss (fl. 1987), American academic, former chair of women's and gender studies at Purdue University
- Mary Zirin (1932–2019), American scholar of Russian literature, advocate for Slavic women's studies

== Uruguay ==
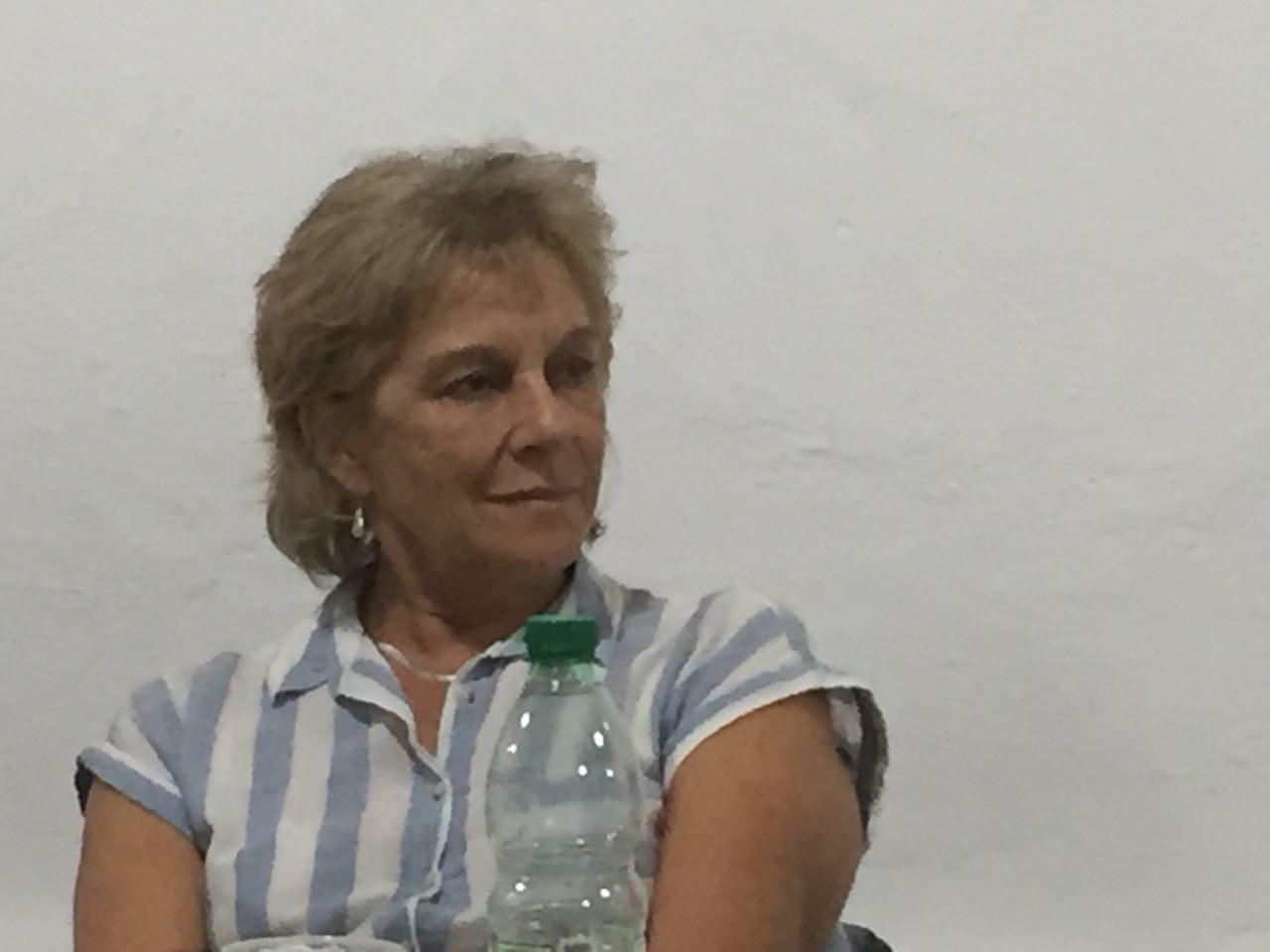
Graciela Sapriza (Uruguay)

- Teresita de Barbieri (1937–2018), Uruguayan feminist sociologist based in Mexico, researcher in social sciences and gender studies focused on Latin America
- Graciela Sapriza (born 1945), Uruguayan historian, focusing on the social, political and cultural participation of Uruguayan women in the 19th and 20th centuries

== Yemen ==
- Huda Ali Alawi (born c. 1970), Yemeni academic, director of the Women Research and Training Center at Aden University
