= Käthe Leichter Prize =

Austrian prize for gender equality in the workplace

The Käthe Leichter Prize is the Austrian State Prize for women's research, gender studies and gender equality in the workplace.

== History ==
The prize, founded in 1991, was created on the initiative of the historian Herbert Steiner, who was assisted by Minister of Women's Affairs, Johanna Dohnal. It is named after the Social Democratic politician Käthe Leichter (1895–1942), who was murdered. The award, which was originally endowed with the title of "State Prize for the Women's History of the Workers and Workers' Movement", is awarded annually by the Ministry of Women and the Ministry of Social Affairs to two women. The jury decides on the award of the prize.

== Winners ==
The winners of the prize have included:

year	State prize	Recognition award
1991	Antonia Bruha, Edith Saurer	Edeltraud Glettler, Helga Embacher
1992	Nawal El Saadawi, Gerda Neyer	Gabriella Hauch, Sylvia Hahn shared with Susanne Mittermeier, Brigitte Bailer-Galanda
1993	Birgit Bolognese-Leuchtenmüller, Waltraud Heindl	Erika Thurner, Karin Berger
1994	Gabriele Anderl, Irene Bandhauer-Schöffmann, Ela Hornung	Helga Hieden-Sommer, Anna Zarnowska
1995	Gerda Lerner, Edeltraud Ranftl	Ingrid Bauer, Ursula Floßmann
1996	Elisabeth List, Eva Cyba	Karin Schmidlechner-Lienhart, Monika Bernold
1997	Herta Nagl-Docekal, Susanne Miller	Birgit Buchinger, Johanna Gehmacher
1998	Neda Bei, Ursula Kubes-Hofmann	Sabine Elisabeth Strasser, Sandra Wiesinger-Stock
1999	Johanna Dohnal, Lisbeth N. Trallori	Hanna Hacker, Christa Ehrmann-Hämmerle
2000	Ulli Pastner, Ulrike Papouschek	Elisabeth Holzleithner, Susan Zimmermann
2001-2004	no awards	no awards
2005	Edit Schlaffer	Michaela Sohn-Kronthaler, Regine Bendl, Maria Mesner shared with Barbara Rohregger
2006	Ruth Kluger	Anita Ziegerhofer-Prettenthaler, Andrea Griesebner, Andrea Ellmeier
2007	Margareta Kreimer	Christine Wächter, Andrea Leitner, Ilse Korotin, Brigitte Lehmann
2008	Eva Kreisky	Gabriele Michalitsch, Viktoria Kriehebauer, Michaela Judy, Johanna Hofbauer
2009	Gudrun Biffl	Christiane Spiel, Luise Gubitzer, Birge Krondorfer, Brigitte Ratzer, Monika Ankele
2010	Luzenir Caixeta	Heidi Schrodt, Gerhild Meier, Bettina Schrittwieser, Alexandra Weiss, Elisabeth Klatzer
2011	Christa Schlager	Angelika Paseka, Beate Großegger, Helga Amesberger shared with Brigitte Halbmayr, Petra Unger
2012	Anna Sporrer	Susanne Dermutz, Birgitt Haller, Ursula Till-Tentschert, Evelyn Höbenreich, Lisa Fischer
2013	Doris Guggenberger	Ilona Horwath, Michaela Windisch-Graetz, Christine Mayrhuber, Sieglinde Rosenberger, Roswith Roth
2014	Doris Weichselbaumer	Ilse Bartosch, Angela Wroblewski, Ingrid Mairhuber, Bettina Haidinger, Brigitte Rath
2015	Birgit Sauer	Dorothea Gaudart, Nadja Bergmann, Julia Eichinger, Karin Schönpflug, Hilde Stockhammer
2016	Brigitte Young	Silvia Kronberger, Waltraud Ernst, Elli Scambor, Karin Sardadvar, Sybille Pirklbauer
2017	Helene Maimann	Heidi Niederkofler, Käthe Knittler, Tamara Geisberger, Nikita Dhawan, Elisabeth Greif
2018	Andrea Bramberger, Traude Mitschka-Kogoj	Renate Ortlieb, Kerstin Witt-Löw, Alyssa Schneebaum, Gitti Vasicek
2019	Maria Cristina Boidi	Julia Schuster, Elisabeth Anna Günther, Katharina Mader, Veronika Duma, Martina Gugglberger
2020	Gabriele Zuna-Kratky	Johanna Pirker, Helene Schiffbänker, Sabine Köszegi, Doris Allhutter, Veronika Helfert
2021	Christine Zulehner, Muriel Niederle	Laura Wiesböck, Emma Dowling, Karin Neuwirth
