= Daniela Hammer-Tugendhat =

Austrian art historian (1946–2025)

- Born: Marie-Daniela Tugendhat; 2 August 1946; Caracas, Venezuela
- Died: 17 September 2025 (aged 79)
- Occupation(s): Art historian, women's studies academic
- Years active: 1975–2025
- Children: 2, including Lukas

Daniela Hammer-Tugendhat (born Marie-Daniela Tugendhat; 2 August 1946 – 17 September 2025) was an Austrian art historian. She was born in Caracas, Venezuela, to a family of wealthy Jewish-Czech textile manufacturers from Brno, who had fled the Nazi occupation of Czechoslovakia during World War II. When the war ended, the family unsuccessfully attempted to reclaim their property in Czechoslovakia and settled in St. Gallen, Switzerland, in 1950. Influenced by her mother's love of art, Hammer-Tugendhat studied art history and archaeology at the University of Bern and the University of Vienna. After completing her PhD in 1975, she taught at the University of Applied Arts Vienna until her retirement in 2012.

From the early 1980s, Hammer-Tugendhat focused on representations of gender in art and analysis of the underlying socio-political meanings women represented in artworks. She gave lectures for the working group on women's history at the University of Vienna in the 1980s and attempted with other academics to launch a graduate-level women's studies program there in 1994. She also led an initiative "Förderung der Frauenforschung und ihrer Verankerung in der Lehre" ("Promotion of Women's Research and Its Anchorage in Teaching") in 1991, which successfully established coordination offices between Austrian universities to link women's studies researchers and created positions for women in the Austrian Ministry of Education, Science and Research. In recognition of her work as a pioneer in the history of feminist art, she was awarded the Gabriele Possanner State Prize of 2009.

== Background ==
Marie-Daniela Tugendhat was born on 2 August 1946 in Caracas, Venezuela, to Grete (née Löw-Beer) and Fritz Tugendhat. Fritz's family were co-owners of the textile firms Feldhendler et Co. and Max Kohn. Although he had wanted to study medicine, Fritz went into the family business and was a fabric designer. Grete's family were industrialists involved in cement, sugar refining, and textile manufacture. The Löw-Beer family had roots in Moravia dating back to the 17th century and their businesses were located in Brno and Svitávka. Grete studied economics in Vienna, but left university in 1922 to marry the industrialist Hans Weiss. She and Hans lived in Germany and had a daughter before they divorced in 1928. While in Germany, Grete became interested in modern art and architecture, particularly the housing on the Weissenhof Estate and a house in Berlin designed by Ludwig Mies van der Rohe, where her friend Eduard Fuchs resided. The year she and Weiss divorced, she married Fritz, a childhood friend. Her parents gave the young couple a lot in Brno, and they commissioned Mies van der Rohe to build their home, Villa Tugendhat. After two years of work, the house was completed in 1930 and the family began occupancy in December, nine months after their oldest son was born. At the time, the children were Hanna Weiss from Grete's first marriage and Fritz and Grete's son, Ernst. While the family was still living in the home, a younger son, Herbert was born. Eight years later, fearing persecution because they were Jewish and the Nazi occupation of Czechoslovakia was imminent, the family fled to St. Gallen, Switzerland, where they lived for three years, (Note: Hanna did not go initially with them to Switzerland. Her father, Hans Weiss, convinced Grete that Hanna, as a German national, was in more danger than her other children who were Czech, and took her to England. Hanna was visiting Grete when France fell to the Nazis and was unable to return to England. She emigrated with the family to Venezuela.) while Fritz managed a textile factory in nearby Kirchberg.

Fearing that Hitler's troops would invade Switzerland, in 1941 the family fled to Caracas, Venezuela, where Fritz had been hired to run the Lanex textile company owned by a group of Corsican financiers. The couple's daughters Ruth, and the youngest, Daniela, were born in Caracas. Hanna and Ernst left Venezuela in 1945 to attend university, respectively at Montreal's McGill University and California's Stanford University. The rest of the family lived in Venezuela for almost a decade, but when the war ended, Grete wanted to return home because of better opportunities for her children's education. Before moving back to St. Gallen in 1950, the couple unsuccessfully attempted to reclaim their property in Czechoslovakia, but the Villa Tugendhat and other properties had been nationalized by first the Nazis and then by the Communist Party of Czechoslovakia. Returning to work at the factory near St. Gallen, the couple decided to become Swiss citizens. Fritz died around 1957 from stomach cancer. Daniela and her mother were very close. Grete shared and encouraged her daughter's interest in art. Daniela began studying art history and classical archeology at the University of Bern in 1964. She transferred to the University of Vienna in 1968 to continue her studies. In 1969 and 1970, Czech architects invited Grete to attend conferences and talk about the house. Tugendhat accompanied her mother there and became interested in the history of the house. She began to question her mother about it, but Grete died in a car accident at the end of 1970. That year, Tagendhat married Ivo Hammer, an Austrian art historian, restorer, and conservationist, with whom she had two children, Matthias and Lukas. Hammer-Tugendhat completed her doctorate in 1975 under the supervision of Otto Pächt. Her thesis focused on principles of design used by the Dutch painter, Hieronymus Bosch. Rather than simply commenting on chronicled changes in Bosch's style and influences over his career, the thesis explored the socio-political aspects of his subjects, examining the historic social details and perceptions that his images depicted.

Hammer-Tugendhat died on 17 September 2025, at the age of 79.

== Career ==
Upon her graduation, Hammer-Tugendhat began work as a lecturer at the University of Applied Arts Vienna. From the 1980s, her work specifically examined gendered differences in art in the German-speaking world. A working group on women's history was created at the University of Vienna, as part of the history department. Despite arguments that the courses taught were frivolous and not scientific, women scholars built networks among German-speaking colleagues to collaborate on research projects. Hammer-Tugendhat gave guest lectures on art history and gender. Beginning in 1986, she and several colleagues began organizing conferences to examine women in art history. The inaugural conference "Frauen-Bilder – Männer-Mythen" (Women's Images – Men's Myths") examined the relationship of both women's and men's representation in art. She worked with a commission of women academics, including Kathrin Hoffmann-Curtius, Sigrid Schade, Viktoria Schmidt-Linsenhoff, and Silke Wenk in the early 1990s, who pressed for the creation of a formal women's and gender studies program at the University of Vienna. Hammer-Tugendhat led the project, "Bourgeois Women's Culture in Austria in the 19th Century" for the Austrian Science Fund between 1989 and 1992. In parallel, she pressed the Austrian Rectors' Conference to ensure equal representation of women as members and the establishment of inter-university coordination for women's studies. The initiative "Förderung der Frauenforschung und ihrer Verankerung in der Lehre" ("Promotion of Women's Research and Its Anchorage in Teaching") sought changes from the Austrian Ministry of Education, Science and Research in the promotion of women's research and women researchers. She was successful in 1991, when for the first time coordination offices were established, linking women's studies researchers from universities in Graz, Linz, and Vienna, and two positions were created in the Ministry of Education.

Hammer-Tugendhat completed her habilitation at the University of Oldenburg in 1993 and at the University of Vienna in 1994 with a thesis focused on gender relationships in art. The thesis examined various works from Medieval iconographical depictions of luxury to the realistic presentation of aspects of relationships in works by Bosch, Jan van Eyck, Giovanni Segantini, and Titian. She was promoted at the University of Applied Arts as an associate professor. That year, she joined Edith Saurer, Irmgard Eisenbach-Stangl, Andre Gingrich, Friederike Hassauer, Cornelia Klinger, Helga Nowotny, Edith Specht, and Ruth Wodak in applying for funds to establish the first graduate gender studies program at the University of Vienna. The Austrian Science Fund rejected their application, but Sauer, Wodak, Gingrich continued pushing and eventually received funding to start the program in 1996. Hammer-Tugendhat became a full professor in 1998, and in 2006 was honored by her colleagues with a festschrift, Asymmetrien: Festschrift zum 60. Geburtstag von Daniela Hammer-Tugendhat (Asymmetries: Festschrift for Daniela Hammer-Tugendhat's 60th Birthday). In 2010, she received the Gabriele Possanner State Prize for 2009 in recognition of her pioneering work in feminist art history. Hammer-Tugendhat remained at the University of Applied Arts, until she retired in 2012. At that time, she was awarded the Honorary Ring of the University of Applied Arts and an honorary professorship.

== Research ==
From the 1970s, Hammer-Tugendhat focused on an interdisciplinary approach to art history, by analyzing art from the broader perspective of cultural science and deconstructing the underlying symbols and philosophical meaning in the works to interpret adherence to or departure from cultural norms. Her research often looked at gendered aspects of painting. For example, her analysis of Dutch painting in the 16th to 17th centuries examined the ratio of images with women as the subject and text focusing on women from the same period. Some of her works examined how images of women were used by artists as representations of either hidden political meaning or social commentary. Adopting a feminist perspective, she examined the voyeuristic aspects of female nudes, wherein the viewer of a work is invisible and removed from the eroticism of the female form. She questioned whether the tendency to remove male actors from erotic works was a means of making male desire invisible. Her major works looked at the ideology behind the imagery depicted in artworks of painting including Bruegel, Rembrandt, Segantini and Titian and what the invisible meanings were in their representation of nudes, gender relations, and sexuality.

== Villa Tugendhat ==
The house in Brno was used to house Nazi and later Soviet troops. When the communist regime of Czechoslovakia took possession it became a rehabilitation center for children. Many of its furnishings and architectural details were destroyed before a group of experts had it declared a historical monument in the 1960s. Hammer-Tugendhat and her husband, Ivo, petitioned the Czechoslovak government for decades to restore the home so that it could be opened to the public. A partial restoration was completed in 1985, and in 1989, Ivo made a proposal for a permanent restoration and renovation program. After the fall of communism the Tugendhat family did not immediately ask for their property to be restored, as the city promised to open it as a public museum. The museum was launched in 1994 and it was designated a UNESCO World Heritage Site in 2001, as a fundamental example of the development of Modern architecture, according to New York City's Museum of Modern Art curator Barry Bergdoll. Despite a competition for restoration work, no further renovations were undertaken before a contract dispute arose in 2006.

Frustrated by the lack of progress, Hammer-Tugendhat asked the government to return the house to the family. The law to return appropriated properties required that the claim be made before 1995, causing Hammer-Tugendhat's lawyer to request that the house be returned under provisions for artworks stolen by the Nazis. The city agreed to return the house, but when Hammer-Tugendhat sold a statue Torso of a Walking Woman by Wilhelm Lehmbruck for over $2 million to finance the repairs and provide initial funds for establishing a management foundation, the city reneged on the agreement. The Moravian Gallery in Brno had returned to the family the statue which had formerly been in the house and had intended that it would remain in the house. The dispute continued until January 2010, when the city finally agreed to return the property, but the high gift tax that was required, again stalled negotiations. In March an agreement was made for the city and the Tugendhat family to work together on the restoration project. The restoration was completed and the house was opened to the public in March 2012.

== Selected works ==
- Hammer-Tugendhat, Daniela (March 1989). "Jan van Eyck – Autonomisierung des Aktbildes und Geschlechterdifferenz" [Jan van Eyck – Autonomization of Nude Images and Gender Difference]. Kritische Berichte (in German). Marburg, Germany: F.E. Simon Verlag: 78-99. ISSN 0340-7403. OCLC 886870376.
- Hammer-Tugendhat, Daniela (September 2012). "Art, Sexuality, and Gender Constructions in Western Culture". Art in Translation. 4 (3). Translated by Zanchi, Michael. Abingdon-on-Thames, Oxfordshire: Taylor & Francis: 361-382. doi:10.2752/175613112X13376070683397. ISSN 1756-1310. OCLC 4912940117.
- Hammer-Tugendhat, Daniela (2015). The Visible and the Invisible: On Seventeenth-Century Dutch Painting (English translation ed.). Berlin, Germany: De Gruyter. ISBN 978-3-11-042690-8.
- Hammer-Tugendhat, Daniela; Hammer, Ivo; Tegethoff, Wolf (2020). The Tugendhat House: Ludwig Mies van der Rohe (3rd revised ed.). Basel, Switzerland: Birkhäuser. ISBN 978-3-0356-2091-7.
