= Grete Jost =

Austrian communist resistance activist

- Born: May 26, 1916; Vienna, Austria-Hungary
- Died: January 15, 1943 (aged 26); Vienna, Nazi Germany
- Political party: Communist Party of Austria (1934-)

Grete Jost (26 May 1916 – 15 January 1943) was a Viennese communist resistance activist against Austrofascism and, after 1938, against National Socialism.

== Biography ==
=== Provenance and early years ===
Margarete "Gretl" Jost was born at the height of the First World War into a working-class family. She grew up in the Erdberg quarter of the Rabenhof district in the south-eastern part of the central Vienna. The family was resolute in its support of the (not yet quite mainstream) Social Democratic Workers' Party ("Sozialdemokratische Arbeiterpartei"). In that respect Grete and her two sisters enjoyed what some would have regarded as an "Austro-Marxist upbringing".

She attended state junior and middle schools locally. Aged only seven she was enrolled into the "Workers' Gymnastics Association" ("Arbeiterturnverein"). She was also a member of the (socialist) "Kindefreunde" organisation between 1926 and 1930. In 1931 she got a job selling shoes. She lost it fairly soon, after which she had no regular employment till 1937, when she managed to get another job as a sales assistant, this time in a knitwear shop. While working as a shoe saleswoman she joined the Free Trades Unions organisation.

=== Politics and resistance ===
Jost withdrew from her trades union activism and, following the brief but brutally suppressed insurrection of February 1934, joined the Communist Party. Joining the Communists reflected a widespread belief on the political left in Vienna that the Social Democratic Workers' Party had shown itself to be insufficiently robust in resisting the political developments of the time. Austria was in the process of becoming a one-party state and Communist Party membership had been illegal since May 1933. She nevertheless participated in party training and recruitment activities. She worked as a treasurer for local party cells and, till Autumn/Fall 1937, undertook distribution of party literature.

She intensified her illegal political activism after March 1938 which was when Fascist Austria was formally incorporated into an enlarged Nazi Germany following a largely unresisted military invasion from the north-west. Margarete Jost became a member of the regional "Provinzkommission". From 1938 she was working as a contact between locals party activists and senior party officials. She became the party contact for the "Südbahnstrecke" - the part of Vienna surrounding the Südbahnhof railway terminus. On the one side this involved communicating instructions from the party regional leadership to activists living "underground" (their place of residence not registered with the city authorities): on the other hand she was responsible for passing to the leadership reports of the "illegal work" undertaken by activists in this part of Vienna. In July 1940 the authorities arrested forty members of the organisation, but even after this sources indicate that there were still around fifty communist activists in the district defined, for the purposes of party organisation, by the suburb of Baden and the surrounding district ("Bezirk Baden und Umgebung"). Jost administered cash contributions and the application of the funds to support comrades who had been arrested and the families left destitute by those arrests.

The court verdict, delivered on 23 September 1942, gives a flavour of Jost's resistance involvement:

- "In the winter of 1939/40 the accused, Jost, made contact with illegal Communist Circles. At the start of 1940 she arranged a meeting of the communist Franz Mittendorfer ... with Fritzsche, whom she knew from her previous communist activities. In March 1940 she was drawn by Fritzsche into illegal cooperation within the 'Provinzkommission' (regional leadership of communist activists). She undertook the illegal association with the Baden area [resistance activists] first through Friedrich Gaubmann and then, after his arrest in July 1940, through [Mr.] Hermann till his arrest. She passed on instructions from Fritzsche and received reports of illegal work in the area ... From Gaubmann, before his arrest, she received a 150 marks contribution which she passed on to (Stephanie) Engler. Contributions collected subsequently she used for the support of arrested comrades and their dependents. Jost also repeatedly supplied printed pamphlets in her area."
- "“Die Angeklagte Jost kam im Winter 1939/40 abermals mit den illegalen Kreisen der KPÖ in Verbindung. Sie führte anfangs 1940 den Kommunisten Franz Mittendorfer (…) mit Fritzsche zusammen, den sie seit ihrer früheren kommunistischen Betätigung kannte. Im März 1940 wurde sie von Fritzsche zur illegalen Mitarbeit innerhalb der Provinzkommission herangezogen (…) Die illegale Verbindung zu dem Gebiet Baden hielt sie zunächst über (Friedrich) Gaubmann und seit dessen Verhaftung im Juli 1940 über Hermann bis zu ihrer Festnahme aufrecht, leitete die Anweisungen des Fritzsche weiter und nahm die Berichte über die illegale Arbeit in diesem Gebiet entgegen (…) Von Gaubmann erhielt sie vor seiner Verhaftung 150.- RM Beitragsgelder und führte sie an (Stefanie) Engler ab, während sie die später übernommenen Beiträge zur Unterstützung der festgenommenen Genossen und deren Angehörigen verwendete. Die Jost belieferte ihr Gebiet auch wiederholt mit Druckschriften.”"

Grete Jost travelled several times in the company of other party members to the underground party headquarters at Baden, some 30 km / 18 miles south of Vienna to discuss political developments and the party's "illegal work". She also continued regularly to distribute antifascist publications such as the party's daily newspaper, Die Rote Fahne, Weg und Ziel and other publications. One publication that she distributed was entitled "Letter of a Young Worker to a Nazi Work-colleague" ("Brief eines jungen Arbeiters an einen nationalsozialistischen Arbeitskammeraden"). This was viewed with particular disfavour by the Nazi authorities because they called on workers to fight against Hitler-fascism and included precise instructions on how to degrade and/or undermine fascist institutions and the German army.

=== Arrest, trial, conviction and execution ===
Grete Jost was arrested on 8, 9 or 11 February 1941. Sources differ, but only in respect of the date. She was taken to the "investigation prison" alongside the Schiffamtsgasse in the Leopoldstadt quarter of central Vienna. Those of her fellow detainees who survived included Antonia Bruha. They would later describe Jost as a courageous and energetic woman, always thirsty for knowledge. She took food to fellow inmates and engaged in lengthy conversations with those that needed to talk. She never gave up on the fight against the Nazi régime. When she was able to obtain information from outside, she always took care to pass it on in full.

Grete Jost's last letter home is dated 6 December 1942:

- "I can only say that I believe that for what I have done, it would be punishment enough to leave me here, frightened and knowing I can expect to be taken away at any moment. Unfortunately in the last few days it has got as bad as it could be. For three weeks we've not been permitted to take a walk, and the whole time we have no work and far too much time to think about things. Often I take a long time just standing on the bed by the window (if I stand on the bed, the window is level with my forehead). And I look up at a little patch of sky, which I can glimpse (it's a really small patch: we're in the basement). And I dream. I often think of the beautiful quote of Mary Stuart: 'Rushing clouds, sailing ships of the sky, who went with you, who sailed aboard you...' Am I really set for the same fate as Mary Stuart? I find that fate too grand for me. She was a queen: I am just a working girl! Tomorrow we have work again, so the time will pass better. We're getting peas to shell."
- "Eines kann ich nur sagen, für was ich getan habe, glaube ich, wäre es auch schon Strafe genug, mich hier bangen zu lassen, wo ich jede Minute damit rechnen muss, geholt zu werden. Hier hat es sich in der letzten Zeit leider auch zum Schlechtesten geändert. Wir dürfen schon seit drei Wochen nicht mehr spazieren gehen, auch hatten wir die ganze Zeit keine Arbeit und dadurch leider viel Zeit zum Nachdenken. Oft stehe ich lange Zeit am Bett beim Fenster (wenn ich auf dem Bett stehe, beginnt in Stirnhöhe das Fenster) und schau hinauf auf das kleine Stückerl Himmel, das ich erblicken kann (es ist wirklich nur sehr klein, wir sind im Parterre), und träume. Da denke ich oft an die Zeilen, die Maria Stuart so schön sagt: ’Eilende Wolken, Segler der Lüfte, wer mit euch wanderte, wer mit euch schiffte . . .‘ Soll mir das gleiche Los wie Maria Stuart beschieden sein? Ich finde das Schicksal zu groß für mich. Sie war doch eine Königin, ich bin aber nur ein Arbeitermädel! Ab morgen haben wir wieder Arbeit, da vergeht die Zeit wieder besser, wir bekommen Erbsen zum ausklauben."

Jost's trial took place on 23 September 1942. She was convicted on the usual charge, under these circumstances, of "preparing to commit high treason" ("Vorbereitung zum Hochverrat") and condemned to death. Others sentenced to deathat the same time included Theodor Pawlin, Theodor Gindra, Gustav Srch and Rudi Spulka. She was transferred to the death cells which were located in the basement under the women's section on the prison hospital. The Communist resistance activist Anna Haider was employed as an assistant in the hospital and was therefore able sometimes to access the death cells to take newspapers to the condemned and, sometimes, engage in conversation with them. She later reported that even at this stage Grete Jost's conduct was exemplary, always ready to comfort others scheduled for execution, and never losing hope of liberation from her fate through the timely arrival of the Red army.

It is apparent, too, from the letters she sent her fiancé and parents during the Autumn/Fall of 1942 that even after sentencing Grete Jost did not immediately lose all hope, though she does appear to have been subject to savage mood swings. Relatives tried desperately to obtain a pardon for her. Her mother had even travelled to Berlin to lobby the justice department. These efforts proved fruitless, however.

A guillotine had been installed inside the Vienna District Court complex ("Wiener Landesgericht") in 1938, shortly after the annexation. Margarete Jost was executed on it on 15 January 1943. Her final words, reportedly, were "Es lebe die Freiheit!" (loosely, "Long live freedom").
