= Kreisky (surname) =

Kreisky is a surname. Notable people with the surname include:

- Bruno Kreisky (1911–1990), Austrian politician
- Eva Kreisky (1944–2024), Austrian political scientist and jurist
