= Linsenhoff =

Linsenhoff is a surname. Notable people with the surname include:

- Ann-Kathrin Linsenhoff (born 1960), German equestrian and Olympic champion
- Liselott Linsenhoff (1927–1999), German equestrian and Olympic champion
- Viktoria Schmidt-Linsenhoff (1944–2013), German art historian and professor
