= Kathrin Hoffmann-Curtius =

German woman art historian

Kathrin Hoffmann-Curtius (19 August 1937 – 25 August 2023) was a German, independent art historian, who taught for a time at the universities of Tübingen, Hamburg, Trier and Vienna.

Hoffmann-Curtius was a member of the Ulmer Verein – Association for Art and Cultural Studies and is affiliated with the Zentralinstitut für Kunstgeschichte. She is a member of the Villigster Research Forum on National Socialism, Racism and Anti-Semitism and a member of several commissions for the erection of contemporary monuments. Her focus is on the representation of nations, art in the Weimar Republic and under National Socialism, the myth of male and female authorship and the painter Hannah Höch.

She was married to the art historian Konrad Hoffmann (1938–2007).

== Publications ==
- Das Programm der Fontana Maggiore in Perugia, Diss. 1968
- Feministische Kunstgeschichte heute: Rück- und Vorschläge. In Kritische Berichte 2, 1999, pp. 26–32.
- Feministische Einsprüche in die Disziplin Kunstgeschichte, kritische berichte, Heft 4, 1993.
- Frauen in der deutschen Kunstgeschichte, FKW/Frauen Kunst Wissenschaft, Zeitschrift für Geschlechterforschung und visuelle Kultur, Rundbrief Nr. 11, (April 1991) pp. 6–13.
- Frauenmord als künstlerisches Thema der Moderne. In Frank J. Robertz, Alexandra Thomas: Mordserie. Kriminologische und kulturwissenschaftliche Skizzierungen eines ungeheuerlichen Phänomens. Munich, belleville 2002
- Erich Wegner's Mordbilder, in Kat: Der stärkste Ausdruck unserer Tage New Objectivity in Hannover, Sprengel Museum Hannover, Olms Verlag 2001, pp. 49–51.
- Mord-Kunst oder der Künstler als (Lust-)Mörder. In Michael Glasmeier, Private Eye–Crimes and Cases. Haus am Waldsee Berlin 1999, pp. 64–85.
- with Walter Jens, Eberhard Roters, Reinhart Koselleck, Gabi Dolff-Bonekämper, Sibylle Tönnies: Streit um die Neue Wache. Zur Gestaltung einer zentralen Gedenkstätte, 1993 ISBN 978-3-88331-975-9
- with Silke Wenk: Mythen von Autorschaft und Weiblichkeit im 20. Jahrhundert. Marburg Jonas Verlag 1997. ISBN 978-3-89445-227-8
- Orientalisierung von Gewalt: Delacroix' Der Tod des Sardanapal, in Annegret Friedrich, Birgit Haehnel, Viktoria Schmidt-Linsenhoff, Christina Threuter (ed.), Projektionen, Rassismus und Sexismus in der visuellen Kultur, Jonas Verlag 1997, pp. 61–78.
- Geschlechterspiel im Dadaism, Kunstforum Vol. 128, 1994 pp. 166–169.
- with Uwe M. Schneede: Im Blickfeld: George Grosz John, Der Frauenmörder, Hamburger Kunsthalle, Hatje Verlag, Stuttgart 1999. ISBN 978-3-77570-443-4.
- Bilder zum Judenmord. Eine kommentierte Sichtung der Malerei und Zeichenkunst in Deutschland von 1945 bis zum Frankfurt Auschwitz trials. Jonas Verlag, Marburg 2014.
- Michelangelo beim Abwasch, Hannah Höchs Zeitschnitte der Avantgarde, in Die Geschlechterverhältnisse zum Tanzen bringen, Beiträge zum Plenum Kunstwissenschaft/Geschlechterverhältnisse. Einsprüche feministischer Wissenschaftlerinnen, 22. Deutscher Kunsthistorikertag, Aachen 1990, Daniela Hammer-Tugendhat, Doris Noell-Rumpeltes, Alexandra Pätzold (ed.), Frauen Kunst Wissenschaft Rundbrief 12 July 1991, pp. 59–80.
- Wenn Blicke töten könnten: Der Künstler als Lustmörder, in Ines Lindner, Sigrid Schade, Silke Wenk, Gabriele Werner (edit.): Blickwechsel, Konstruktionen von Weiblichkeit und Männlichkeit in Kunst und Kunstgeschichte, Berlin: Reimer 1989, pp. 369–393.
- Frauenbilder Oskar Kokoschka's, in Frauen/Bilder, Männer/Mythen, publisher. Ilsebill Barta among others, Berlin: Reimer 1987, pp. 148–178.
- Terror in Deutschland 1918/19. Bilder zur Ermordung Rosa Luxemburgs. In Linda Hentschel ed. .H: Bilderpolitik in Zeiten von Krieg und Terror: Medien Macht und Geschlechterverhältnisse; Berlin: b-books 2008, pp. 73–91.
- Frauenmord als Spektakel: Max Beckmann's Martyrium der Rosa Luxemburg. In SusanneKomfort-Hein/Susanne Scholz, Lustmord-Medialisierung eines kulturellen Phantasmas Königstein i. T.: Ulrike Helmer, 2007, pp. 91–113.
- Der irrende Ritter. Künstler-, Kampf- und Kriegerromantik zum Ersten Weltkrieg. In Frauen Kunst Wissenschaft, fascicule 41, June 2006, pp. 51–60.
