= Wolfgang Clemen =

German literary scholar (1909–1990)

Wolfgang Clemen (9 March 1909 in Bonn, Germany – 16 March 1990 in Bad Endorf, Bavaria, Germany) was an eminent German literary scholar who helped reestablish English Studies in Germany after World War II. His father, Paul Clemen, was a well-known art historian.

== Biography/Career ==
Clemen studied from 1928 to 1934 at Heidelberg University, the University of Freiburg, the Friedrich Wilhelm University of Berlin, the Ludwig-Maximilians-Universität München, the University of Bonn, and the University of Cambridge. Among his academic teachers were Ernst Robert Curtius, Carl Vossler, and Hugo Friedrich. He received his doctorate in 1936 with a doctoral dissertation on Shakespeare’s images, and his post-doctoral degree (Habilitation) with a study of Geoffrey Chaucer. After a short period as Lecturer for literary history at the University of Cologne, he moved to Kiel University. From 1946 until 1974, he was chair of English at the Ludwig-Maximilians-Universität München. In 1953, he was Visiting Professor at Columbia University; in 1964, he was Visiting Professor at the University of Bristol.

In 1964, Clemen founded the Munich Shakespeare Library, one of the major collections of scholarship on William Shakespeare outside Britain.

== Scholarly achievements ==
Clemen's reputation rests in large part on his monograph on Shakespeare’s Imagery, a revised English translation of his doctoral dissertation published in 1951 with Methuen Publishing in London. However, the English translation of his Habilitation on Geoffrey Chaucer’s early poetry was of similar importance. Until Clemen's study, Chaucer's The House of Fame, The Book of the Duchess, The Parliament of Fowls, and Anelida and Arcite had not been considered to be at the same level of creative mastery as the Canterbury Tales and Troilus and Criseyde. This changed because Clemen could demonstrate that the Middle English author was as independent of his French and Classical sources in his early as in his later poetry.

== Select publications ==
- Shakespeare's Soliloquies
- The Development of Shakespeare's Imagery
- Das Wesen der Dichtung in der Sicht moderner englischer und amerikanischer Dichter
- Der junge Chaucer / Chaucer's Early Poetry
- Die Tragödie vor Shakespeare
- Das Drama Shakespeares
- Shakespeares Monologe

== Literature ==
- Frank-Rutger Hausmann, Anglistik und Amerikanistik im Dritten Reich (Frankfurt: Klostermann, 2003), esp. pp. 448–449.
- Ina Schabert, ed. Wolfgang Clemen im Kontext seiner Zeit: Ein Beitrag zur Wissenschaftsgeschichte vor und nach dem Zweiten Weltkrieg. Heidelberg: Universitätsverlag Winter, 2009.
- Richard Utz, Chaucer and the Discourse of German Philology (Turnhout: Brepols, 2002), esp. pp. 207–20.
