= Nikita Dhawan =

Indian political scientist (born 1972)

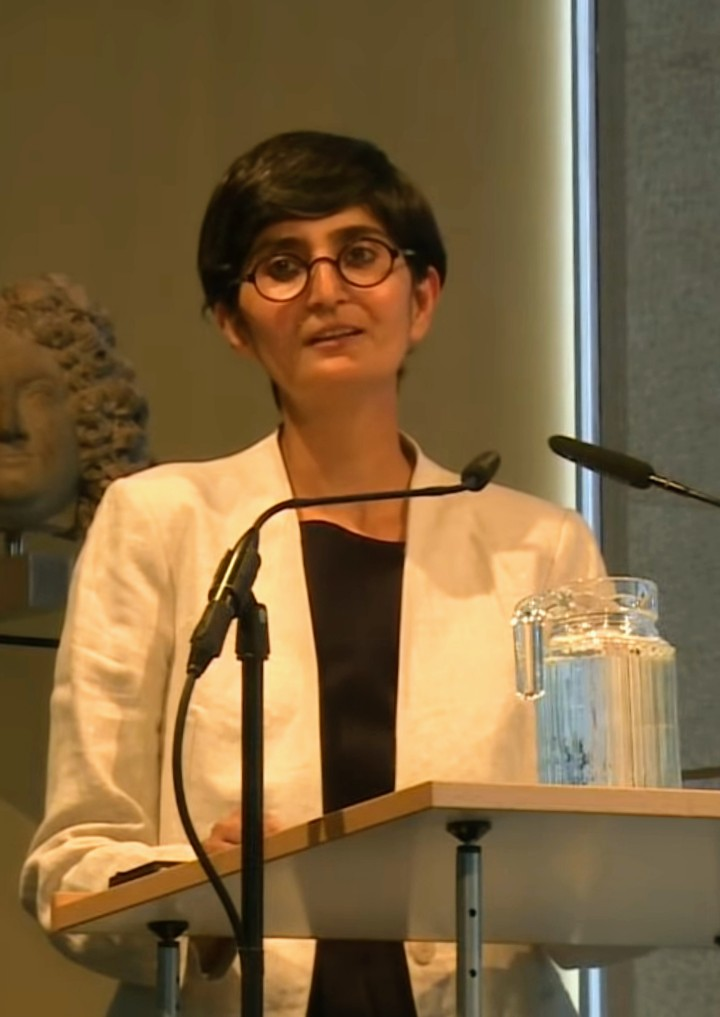
- Nikita Dhawan, 2018
- Born: 1972 (age 53–54)
- Awards: Käthe Leichter Prize (2017)

Academic background
- Education: University of Mumbai; Shreemati Nathibai Damodar Thackersey Women's University; Ruhr University Bochum (PhD)

Academic work
- Discipline: Political science
- Institutions: TU Dresden; University of Giessen; University of Innsbruck; University of Frankfurt

Nikita Dhawan (born 1972) is an Indian political scientist, author, and academic. She is the professor of political theory and history of ideas at TU Dresden, Germany, as well as the chair of political science. Her research interests are in the areas of global justice, human rights, democracy and decolonization.

== Early life and education ==
Dhawan was born in 1972 in Thane, Mumbai, India. She was named after Nikita Khrushchev. She studied philosophy and German studies at the University of Mumbai, as well as gender studies at the Research Centre for Women's Studies, Shreemati Nathibai Damodar Thackersey (SNDT) Women's University. She completed her PhD in philosophy from Ruhr University Bochum, Germany in 2006.

== Career ==
In 2006, Dhawan was awarded the Maria Goeppert-Mayer Guest Professorship at the Institute for Political Science, University of Oldenburg and completed her postdoctoral fellowship at the International Graduate Centre for the Study of Culture (GCSC) at University of Giessen.

From 2008 to 2014, Dhawan was junior professor of gender and postcolonial studies at the University of Frankfurt, Germany, where she founded the Frankfurt Research Center for Postcolonial Studies (FRCPS) to spotlight non-eurocentric critical theories, particularly feminist-postcolonial theory, with a focus on race, class, gender, sexuality, religion and post-colonialism; post-colonial diasporas and transnationalism; globalization and post-development studies; and decolonization, democratization and gender justice. In collaboration with fellow-political scientist María do Mar Castro Varela, she wrote the first critical introduction to postcolonial theory to "analyze the different levels of colonial encounters in textual, figurative, spatial, historical, political and economic perspectives." FRCPS was equipped with its own library, invited international scholars such as Gayatri Chakravorty Spivak, Judith Butler and Angela Davis for expert-led discussions, and offered courses beyond the mainstream. She also served as the principal investigator of the Cluster of Excellence "The Formation of Normative Orders" (known as Research Centre Normative Orders today), a research network funded by German Research Foundation as part of the Excellence Initiative of the German federal and state governments. In addition, she was a member of the board of directors of the Cornelia Goethe Center for Women's Studies and the Study of Gender Relations.

When she received an offer to join University of Innsbruck, Austria, she attempted to negotiate a permanent position at University of Frankfurt. Despite receiving support from Cluster of Excellence, the Department of Social Sciences and the Student Council, the university did not retain her. In a statement released by the Presidium, the university confirmed that Dhawan had been "presented with an offer within the framework of university possibilities" and losing an "excellent scientist" was regrettable. Rainer Forst, professor of political theory and spokesperson of the Cluster of Excellence credited her for building "an internationally visible research center" and initiating a "very fruitful" dialogue between the critical and the postcolonial theory. The Student Council criticized the university's decision, accusing the Presidium of ignoring and overlooking the department's interests. Dhawan's departure resulted in the dismantling of FRCPS, which she considered a missed opportunity to "firmly establish postcolonial perspectives in Frankfurt." While acknowledging that bringing a transformative change in the German education system was akin to "mission impossible", she said: "I hold it with the Marxist theorist Antonio Gramsci: What we need is a pessimism of the mind, an optimism of the will."

Dhawan was the professor of political theory and gender studies at the University of Innsbruck, Austria for four years (2014–2018), where she directed the research platform "Gender Studies: Identities - Discourses - Transformations". In 2017, she was the recipient of the Käthe Leichter Prize in 2017 for her research in the field of women's and gender studies as well as for the promotion of the women's movement and gender equality. Between 2018 and 2021, Dhawan was the professor of political science with a focus on gender studies the University of Giessen, Germany.

Since October 2021, Dhawan has been the chairholder of political theory and history of ideas at TU Dresden, Germany. In 2023, she was awarded the Gerda Henkel Visiting Professorship at Stanford University and the Thomas Mann Fellowship at Thomas Mann House, Los Angeles.

Dhawan has been a visiting scholar at the Indian Institute of Technology (IIT), Bombay, (2019–2020) Universidad de Costa Rica, Costa Rica (2013), Institute for International Law and the Humanities, University of Melbourne, Australia (2013), University of California, Berkeley (2012),University of La Laguna, Spain (2011), Pusan National University, South Korea (2011), University of Kassel, Germany (2011), University of Witwatersrand, South Africa (2010) and Columbia University, New York (2008).

== Research ==
Dhawan analyzes the historical, economic, sociopolitical and cultural interrelations of Europe and the postcolonial world, addressing key ethical and epistemological questions of political and social inequality, intersectionality and diversity, religion and secularism, democracy and cosmopolitanism, transnational gender justice, women's rights, migration and globalization. Her research also explores the relationship between states, civil society, and subaltern groups in the context of citizenship, political agency, and social vulnerability.

=== Social movements as producers and reinforcers of hegemonic relationships ===
While transnational social movements advocate for civil rights implementation and improvement, Dhawan argues that such movements are often embedded within existing structures of global inequality and unequal power distributions." Although social movements may be perceived as a "public manifestation of people's power that can reclaim democracy," Dhawan warns that "in reality, civil society does not always live up to its emancipatory self-image." She calls for a close examination of relationships "between those that provide help and those that receive help" within and around such movements, given that "cosmopolitan compassion" actively reinforces and "reproduces neoliberal structures of social inequality" leading to the "marginalization of specific groups and societies."

Dhawan also argues that "social movements are marked through an intrinsic ambivalence" and refers to the public manifestations of resistance following a rape in India as an example. She says: "Not all bodies are equally satisfactory to disrupt civil society, as only specific rape cases resulted in public indignation while similar incidents in poorer neighbouring areas did not lead to ensuing protests. Speaking and protesting in the name of someone else is accompanied by skewed distributions of power and agency, because individuals possess different amounts of power and resources to mobilize and stand up for civil rights."

Dhawan rejects the "dichotomy between 'good' civil society that stands in contrast to the 'evil' state" and underscores the need to reconsider the state's role in safeguarding civil rights and supporting tangible change. According to her, civil society cannot be the only instrument for successful political change, and encourages "a rigorous passionate critique of the state and government."

=== Homonationalism in queer theory ===
Dhawan posits that the Western discourse often fuels an orientalist thought, effectively framing western societies as more "tolerant and queer-friendly" compared to non-Western insofar that western constructions, such as coming out are considered as markers for a progressive civilization. Similar to Jasbir Puar, she problematizes how the discourse surrounding sexual freedom is used to further stigmatize religious minorities in both the global north and global south. However, she criticizes Puar and others for solely focusing on homophobia, queer racism, and homonationalism by Western actors when the current queer academic discourse makes it difficult for scholars to "address homophobia and heteronormativity in the postcolonial world and diasporic communities."

Dhawan is of the opinion that the prevailing queerphobia in diasporic and postcolonial contexts is a direct consequence of and a reaction to Western imperialism and racism. She recommends that anti-imperialist and anti-racist critique should accompany the critique of heteronormative structures in a post colonial contexts. According to her, "homonationalism is based on a unidimensional understanding of power and violence" and by focusing predominantly on the power and violence that floats from Western liberal states to the Global South, Puar ignores or overlooks the power and violence that queer people experience in the global south. Dhawan argues that "power and violence are deeply entangled and flow from multiple sources." She uses the example of migration to further support her argument: Queer migrants, in addition to the queerphobia and heteronormative assumptions within their own communities, struggle with the "racialized, classed, orientalist, and heterosexist attitudes and practices" in the country they have migrated to. This relates to her widespread criticism of "state phobia" wherein she argues that Puar does not critique the state and actively dismisses state involvement thereby rendering instances of queer negotiation with the state as homonationalism. Dhawan believes that while the state is responsible for perpetuating hetero- and homonormative structures, it can "play a prominent role in protecting queer people."

== Awards and recognition ==
Dhawan is the recipient of the 2017 Käthe Leichter Prize for her achievements in the field of gender studies and in support of the women's movement and the achievement of gender equality.

== Selected publications ==
=== Books ===
- Dhawan, Nikita (2026). Rescuing the Enlightenment from the Europeans: Critical Theories of Decolonization. Durham: Duke University Press. ISBN 978-1-4780-3293-9, 978-1-4780-2945-8, 978-1-4780-6166-3.
- Cooper, Davina; Dhawan, Nikita; Newman, Janet (2020). Reimagining the state: theoretical challenges and transformative possibilities. Social justice. Abingdon, Oxon: Routledge, Taylor & Francis Group. ISBN 978-0-8153-8215-7, 978-0-8153-8215-7.
- Dhawan, Nikita, ed. (2014). Decolonizing enlightenment: transnational justice, human rights and democracy in a postcolonial world. Politik und Geschlecht. Opladen: Barbara Budrich. ISBN 978-3-8474-0056-1, 978-3-8474-0056-1.

=== Journal articles ===
- Dhawan, Nikita. 2021. "The Death of Leviathan: Feminist Dilemmas and State Phobia". Social Politics: International Studies in Gender, State & Society. 28 (3): 682–703. doi:10.1093/sp/jxz031 ISSN 1072-4745.
- Dhawan, Nikita. 2018. "Marxist Critique of Post-Colonialism". Krisis | Journal for Contemporary Philosophy 38 (2): 105–7.
- Dhawan, Nikita. 2017. Can Non‐Europeans Philosophize? Transnational Literacy and Planetary Ethics in a Global Age. Hypatia, 32(3), 488–505. doi:10.1111/hypa.12333
- Dhawan, Nikita; Varela, Maria do Mar Castro. 2018. "What difference does difference make?: Diversity, intersectionality and transnational feminist politics". Tijdschrift voor Genderstudies. 21 (1): 45–67. ISSN 1388-3186.
