= Lukas Hammer =

Austrian politician (born 1983)

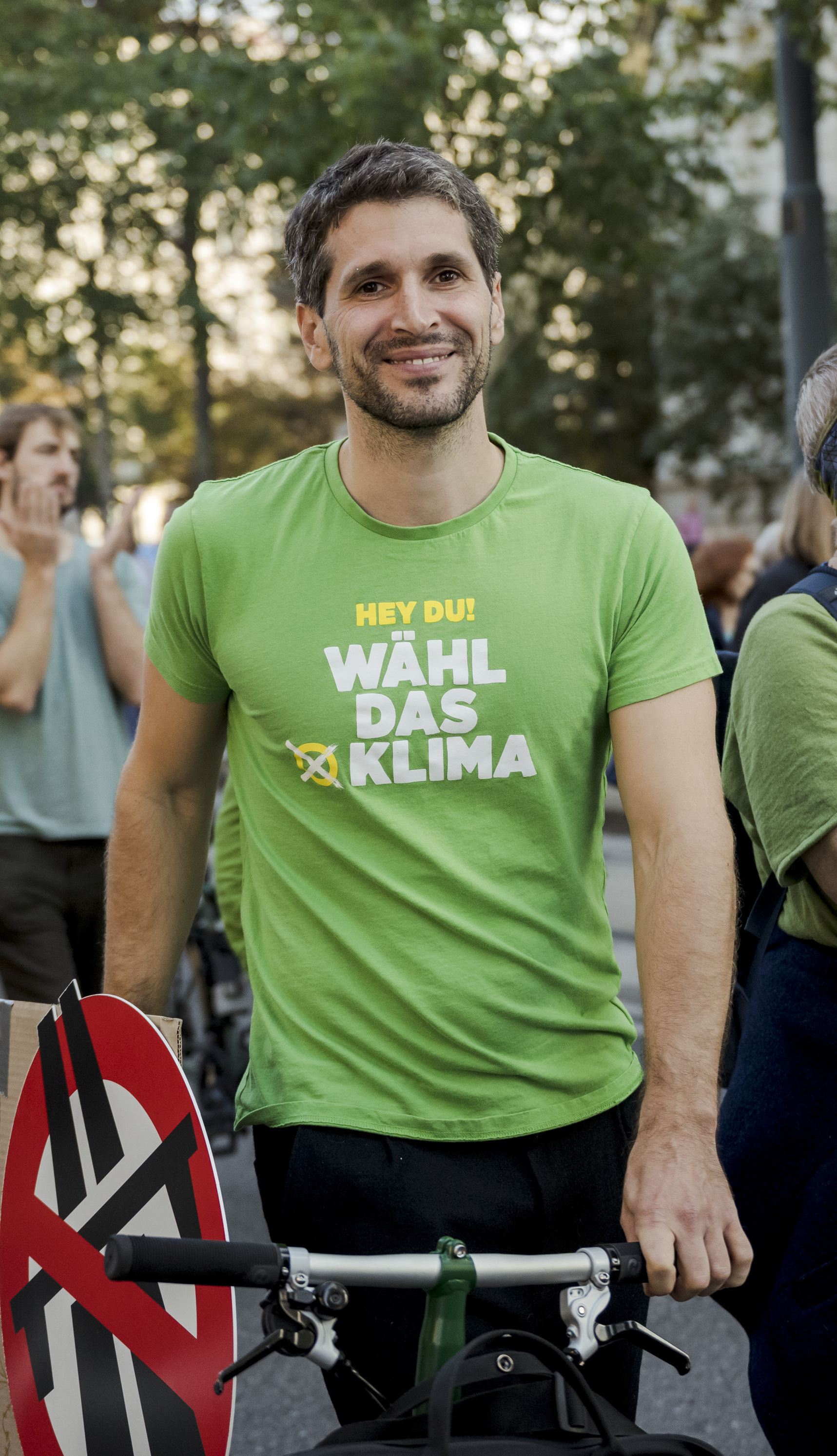
- Hammer in 2024

Member of the National Council
- Incumbent
- Assumed office 23 October 2019
- Constituency: Vienna North West

Personal details
- Born: 25 May 1983 (age 42)
- Party: The Greens
- Parent: Daniela Hammer-Tugendhat (mother)

Lukas Hammer (born 25 May 1983) is an Austrian politician of The Greens serving a member of the National Council since 2019. He is the son of art historian Daniela Hammer-Tugendhat.
