= Helene Maimann =

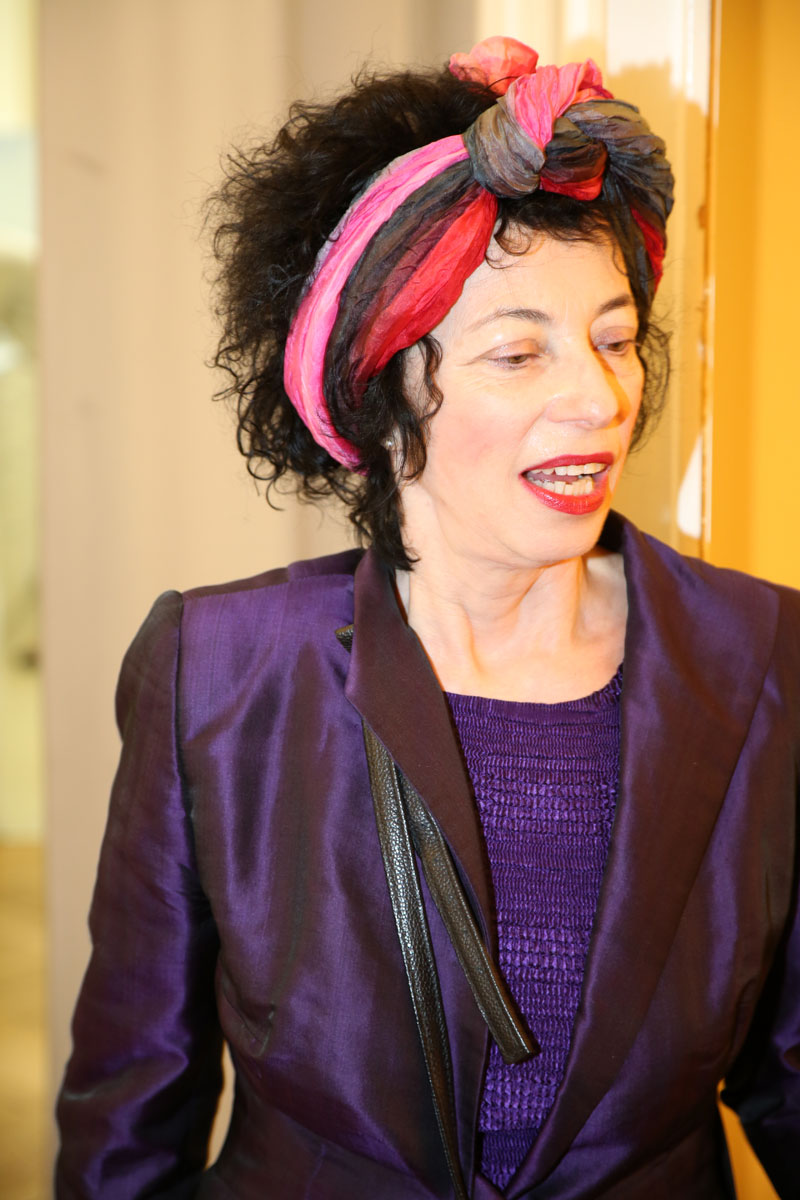
2013 Image of Helene Maimann

Helene Maimann (born in Vienna) is an Austrian historian, writer, filmmaker and exhibition organizer. She won an Axel Corti Prize, and Käthe Leichter Prize.

== Life ==
After studying history, German studies and philosophy in Vienna she did her doctorate in 1973 about the Austrian Exile. Between 1980 and 1994 she worked as a lecturer at the universities of Vienna and Salzburg. In the 1980s Maimann managed various exhibitions about Austria’s contemporary history. From 1995 on – after many years of work for the Ludwig Boltzmann Gesellschaft – she started working as an editor for the ORF. In addition she published numerous articles and books. Since 2008 Maimann has been working as an author and filmmaker, teaching at Filmacademy Vienna. In 2010 Maimann's documentary film "Die Sterne verlöschen nicht – Überleben im Versteck" (The Stars Never Go Out - Surviving in the Hideout) was shown at the Jewish Filmfestival Zagreb.
