= Gabriele Possanner =

Austrian doctor (1860–1940)

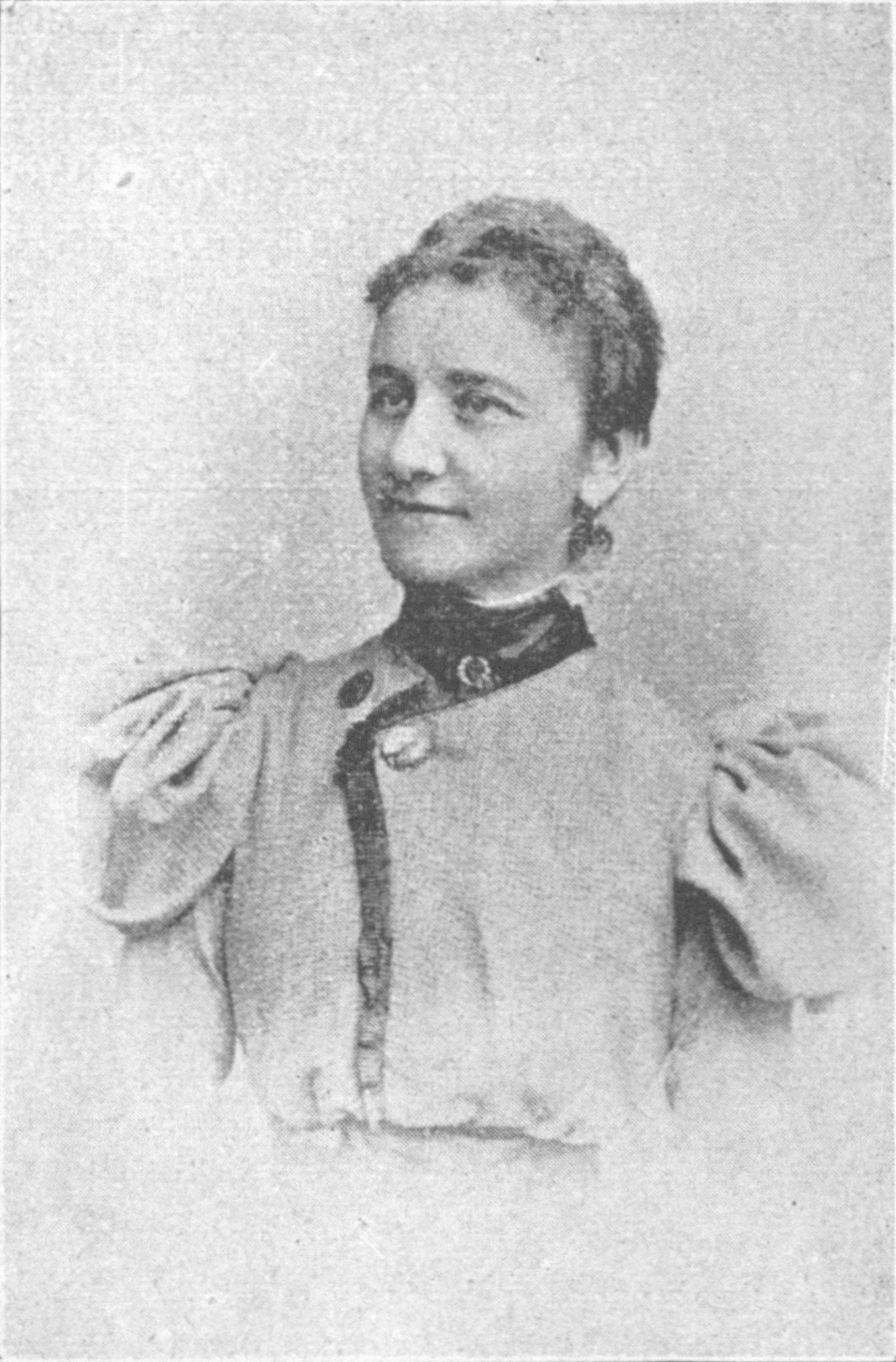
Gabriele Possanner

Gabriele Possanner (27 January 1860 – 14 March 1940) was the first woman medical doctor to practice medicine in Austria.

== Biography ==
She was the daughter of the Austrian jurist Benjamin Possanner, and lived in six different cities until the age of twenty due to him moving often for his work. In October 1880 he was appointed as Section Chief at the Imperial Treasury in Vienna, and the family, including Gabriele, was able to settle in Vienna.

As a doctor, Possanner initially worked as a public medical officer in Bosnia-Herzegovina, where Muslim women refused to be seen by male doctors. She had been given a medical degree by the University of Zurich in 1894, but it was not until 1897 that she was able to take the viva voce examination a second time, this time in front of Viennese examiners, thus qualifying her to practice as a doctor in Austria. She thus became the first woman to graduate from the University of Vienna with a medical degree in 1897. After that, she was the only female doctor at an Austrian-Hungarian hospital until 1903.

== Death and legacy ==
Possanner died 14 March 1940.

In 1960, the Possannergasse in Hietzing was named after Gabriele. In 2004, the Gabriele-Possanner-Park in the 9th Viennese district was named after her as well. There is also the Gabriele Possanner Institute for Interdisciplinary Research in the 21st Viennese district.

The Gabriele Possanner State Prize (German: Gabriele-Possanner-Staatspreis) is a state award for feminist research in Austria, named for Gabriele. It was established in 1997, and is awarded every second year by the Federal Ministry of Science and Research.
