= Maria Mesner =

Austrian historian and archivist

- Born: 1960 (age 65–66); Braunau am Inn, Austria
- Occupation: Academic
- Years active: 1986–present

Maria Mesner (born 1960) is an Austrian contemporary historian who heads the gender studies program at the University of Vienna. She is co-editor of the journal Österreichischen Zeitschrift für Geschichtswissenschaften (Austrian Journal for Historical Studies) and directs the Bruno Kreisky Archives.

== Early life and education ==
Maria Mesner was born in 1960 in Braunau am Inn to Anna and Walter Mesner. Her mother was a tailor and her father was a toolmaker. She attended the Bundesgymnasium in Braunau am Inn, completing her studies in 1978. That year she enrolled in a double major in German history and philology and sociology at the University of Vienna, graduating in 1986 with her magister degree. She completed her PhD under Edith Saurer with the dissertation Die Aus-einandersetzung um den Schwangerschaftsabbruch in Österreich. Zur politischen Kultur der Zweiten Republik (The Dispute over Abortion in Austria: In the Political Culture of the Second Republic) in 1994.

== Career ==
Mesner began her career in 1986 as a research assistant at the Karl Renner Institute. She was promoted to head the Social Sciences and Documentation Department in 1996, working in that capacity until 1999, when she went to New York to attend The New School for Social Research as a Fulbright visiting scholar. Returning to Austria, she was hired to head the Bruno Kreisky Archives in 2000 and the following year began working as co-editor of the journal Österreichischen Zeitschrift für Geschichtswissenschaften (Austrian Journal for Historical Studies). Completing her habilitation in 2004, Mesner began lecturing at the University of Vienna and was promoted to senior lecturer in 2012. Since 2015, she has headed the department of gender research at the University of Vienna and in 2016 became the assistant director of the university's Institute for Contemporary History.

Mesner's research focuses on the effect of gender on politics, reproductive history, and denazification. She has evaluated the abortion laws in Austria to examine how a women's problem became appropriated by male-dominated political systems, in an attempt to preserve archaic social norms as a mechanism to provide political stability. She has also compared the use of laws in Austria to those in the United States and other countries to evaluate differences in reproduction history, as well as the changing effects of political and scientific thought, such as Nazism, eugenics, and assisted reproductive technology on policies governing reproduction.

== Selected works ==
- Mesner, Maria (1989). Woher wir kommen [Where We Come from] (in German). Vienna: Renner-Institut. OCLC 914894537.
- Fröschl, Erich; Mesner, Maria; Ra'anan, Uri (1991). Staat und Nation in multi-ethnischen Gesellschaften [State and Nation in Multi-Ethnic Societies] (in German) (Dt. Erstausg ed.). Passagen-Verlag. ISBN 978-3-900767-83-9.
- Mesner, Maria (1994). Frauensache?: Zur Auseinandersetzung um den Schwangerschaftsabbruch in Österreich nach 1945 [Women's Issue?: On the Dispute about Abortion in Austria after 1945] (in German). Vienna: Jugend & Volk Verlag. ISBN 978-3-224-12800-2.
- Pasteur, Paul; Niederacher, Sonja; Mesner, Maria, eds. (2003). Sexualität, Unterschichtenmilieus und Arbeiter Innenbewegung [Sexuality, Lower Class Environments and the Workers' Movement] (in German). Leipzig: Akademische Verlagsanstalt. ISBN 978-3-931982-31-7.
- Mesner, Maria (2004). Das Geschlecht der Politik [The Gender of Politics] (in German). Vienna: Verlag Österreich. ISBN 978-3-85224-114-2.
- Mesner, Maria (2005). Entnazifizierung zwischen politischem Anspruch, Parteienkonkurrenz und Kaltem Krieg: das Beispiel der SPÖ [Denazification between Political Claims, Party Competition, and the Cold War: The Example of the SPÖ] (in German). Vienna: Oldenbourg Verlag. ISBN 978-3-486-57815-7.
- Mesner, Maria; Wolfgruber, Gudrun (2006). The Policies of Reproduction at the Turn of the 21st Century: The Cases of Finland, Portugal, Romania, Russia, Austria, and the US. Innsbruck: StudienVerlag. ISBN 978-3-7065-4088-9.
- Mesner, Maria (2010). Geburten/Kontrolle: Reproduktionspolitik im 20. Jahrhundert [Births/Control: Reproductive Policy in the 20th Century] (in German). Vienna: Böhlau Verlag. ISBN 978-3-205-78320-6.
- Mesner, Maria; Heiss, Gernot (2012). Asyl: das lange 20. Jahrhundert [Asylum: The Long 20th Century] (in German). Vienna: Löcker. ISBN 978-3-85409-628-3.
- Mesner, Maria; Kriechbaumer, Robert; Maier, Michaela; Wohnout, Helmut, eds. (2014). Parteien und Gesellschaft im Ersten Weltkrieg: das Beispiel Österreich-Ungarn [Parties and Society in the First World War: The Example of Austria-Hungary] (in German). Vienna: Böhlau Verlag. doi:10.7767/9783205793687. ISBN 978-3-205-79620-6.
- Mesner, Maria; Mesquita, Sushila (2018). Eine emotionale Geschichte: Geschlecht im Zentrum der Politik der Affekte [An Emotional Story: Gender Affects at the Center of Politics] (in German) (1. Auflage ed.). Vienna: Zaglossus Verlag. ISBN 978-3-902902-60-3.
