= Gabriele Possanner State Prize =

The Gabriele Possanner State Prize (German: Gabriele-Possanner-Staatspreis) is a state award for feminist research in Austria, named for Gabriele Possanner. It was established in 1997, and is awarded every second year by the Federal Ministry of Science and Research.

== Laureates ==
Year	Laureate
1997	Edith Saurer
1999	Eva Kreisky
2001	Silvia Ulrich
2003	Elisabeth List
2005	Margarethe Hochleitner
2007	Lisbeth N. Trallori
2009	Daniela Hammer-Tugendhat
2011	Ina Wagner
2017	Elisabeth Holzleithner
2023	Elke Krasny
