= Antonia Bruha =

Antonia "Toni" Bruha
- Born: Antonia Spath; 1 March 1915; Vienna, Austro-Hungarian Empire
- Died: 26 December 2006 (aged 91); Vienna, Austria
- Occupations: Hairdresser; Linguist; Anti-Nazi resistance activist Author
- Known for: surviving Ravensbrück
- Spouse: Josef Bruha
- Children: Sonja Bruha

Antonia "Toni" Bruha (born Antonia Spath; 1 March 1915 – 27 December 2006) was an Austrian resistance activist. After the war she became a translator and author.

== Provenance and early years ==
Antonia Spath was born in Vienna shortly after the outbreak of the First World War. During the first six years of her life she and her elder sister grew up with their grandparents in Bohemia because their parents could not afford to feed them. Back in Vienna, once the financial situation improved for the girls' parents, she found her mother very strict. She grew up bilingual in German and Czech, later also adding Russian to her repertoire of languages. Her father, the son of an Erdberg coachman, who himself worked as a master-brewer at the Ottakringer Brewery, saw to it that she attended a Komenský (i.e. Czech language) school, and she was keen to pursue Slavic studies at a higher level, but this time her mother's uncompromisingly conservative convictions prevailed.

In the end she embarked on an apprenticeship with Joseph Schindler, as a hairdresser and beauty therapist. She had made contact with Schindler through a Quaker Youth Group. Alongside her formal apprenticeship, the Quaker group provided English lessons. In return, she taught her colleagues, who had plans to set up a Quaker group in Prague, Czech. She was fascinated by the pacifist attitudes adopted by the Quakers: she found they fitted in well with the socialist precepts she had picked up from her father who had been politically active at the time of the Dual Monarchy. According to her own later recollections, Antonia Spath learned almost nothing about hairdressing, but she did manage to make three visits to Prague during her apprenticeship.

== Gymnastics, politics and marriage ==
She became a member of a Czech workers' gymnastics club ("Dělnická Tělovýchovná Jednota" / DTJ). The times were becoming increasingly politicised, and membership of the club was restricted to Social Democrats. In 1933 Antonia Spath began writing, under the pseudonym Tanja Spatová, for the Czech language labour movement press, contributing to "Vídeňské dělnické listy" ("Vienna Workers' Pages") and ""Mladý dělnik" ("Young Worker"). It was at the DTJ that she met Josef Bruha, whom she later married. Bruha was a gifted gymnast and employed by Siemens as a factory foreman. He was also a former Republican Protection League ("... Schutzbund") member. In February 1934 he participated in the disturbances around the vast Rabenhof (apartment complex) and, as a result, lost his job. When the two of them married in 1935 their financial situation was dire, since Bruha had still been unable to find employment, and his wife's work as a hairdresser was poorly paid. Nevertheless, supported by her husband Antonia Bruha was able to fulfill "her life's dream" in 1936 when she enrolled at the university to study languages. It was partly in order to supplement the household income that she continued to provide poems and short stories, now under the pseudonym Tana Bruhova, to the Czech-language (and later also German-language) socialist press. However, an early casualty of the German annexation of Austria in March 1938 was the university's Faculty of Slavonic Studies which was closed down by the Nazis. Antonia Bruha never completed her degree.

- "We cycled to Preßburg and back. On one handlebar I carried workers' newspapers – which were printed in Preßburg – and on the other, communist leaflets."
- "Wir fuhren mit dem Fahrrad nach Preßburg und wieder zurück. Auf der einen Lenkstange hatte ich die Arbeiterzeitung – die in Preßburg gedruckt wurde –, auf der anderen kommunistische Flugblätter."
Antonia Bruha, interviewed by Martyna Czarnowska, 2005

Inspired, no doubt, by developments in Germany, during 1933, Austria was also becoming increasingly fascist and dictatorial even before the German invasion. Josef and Antonia Bruha actively opposed Chancellor Schuschnigg's government. Together they would bicycle to the frontier with Czechoslovakia, in a wooded area near Preßburg, in order to collect bundles of Socialist and Communist publications, banned in Austria, that had been left for them by comrades. They then distributed the contraband publications in Vienna.

== Anschluss and opposition ==
After the annexation Austria quickly became incorporated into an enlarged Nazi German state. Opposition activism became both more dangerous and, for the politically committed, more urgent. However, for the Bruhas the situation was complicated by Josef's work situation. Fourteen days after the Nazis arrived he was re-employed by Siemens not in his previous post as a foreman, but as a divisional head, in charge of a department containing 300-400 women, two mechanics and his own typist (according to his wife). In financial terms the Nazi take-over triggered a hitherto unknown level of prosperity for the couple. The Bruhas nevertheless joined the resistance group around Alois Houdek. Initially the group was restricted to members of the Czech minority, but it subsequently expanded to include members of the German speaking community who had not previously been politically engaged. Toni Bruha wrote and distributed leaflets encouraging opposition to the government. Group members escorted Jews, escaping from the evolving hardships and dangers of state-mandated antisemitism, to the Swiss frontier. Members also engaged in acts of sabotage. Josef Bruha believed that it was impossible to be certain that no one would be hurt when a target was attacked, so refused to engage in sabotage actions, but the time came when he was sent to Berlin on a training course: Antonia took advantage of his absence to participate. An action in which she took part involved setting fire to – one source uses the term "blowing up" – army facilities. Already pregnant, she cycled with comrades, carrying a large quantity of chemicals that had been smuggled out of a factory, to a block of ten military storage depots containing uniforms, weapons and food rations, in Lobau. No lives were endangered, she later maintained with evident satisfaction.

Welcoming members from beyond the confines of the Czech minority made the group more vulnerable to infiltration, and towards the end of 1940 the group of worker-gymnast activists was penetrated by a Gestapo spy. Most would pay for their actions with their lives. The arrests began during the first part of 1941. By 1943 the authorities had detained one hundred group members of whom sixty-nine had not survived. Among those who perished, shot or beheaded, were Alois Houdek himself and Franz Narkowitz, who had been one of those involved, with Bruha, in the Lobau "event".

- "My husband had burned everything, got rid of everything, and I always thought they would not arrest me, they would not arrest me with the child. Despite my illegal activities, I was so naive back then. that I believed that they would do nothing to harm the children."
- "Mein Mann hat alles verbrannt, alles weggeräumt, und ich habe mir nur immer gedacht, die werden mich doch nicht verhaften, die werden mich doch nicht verhaften mit dem Kind. Ich war damals trotz der illegalen Arbeit so naiv, dass ich geglaubt habe, die tun den Kindern nichts."
Antonia Bruha, quoted posthumously by Brigitte Halbmayr, 2007

Antonia Bruha had always wanted to have a child, but the timing of her pregnancy and of her daughter's birth, on 5 July 1941, was unplanned. It was shortly after Sonja's birth that Bruha became aware that their group contained a Gestapo informer. Her own arrest, together with that of her husband and her infant child, occurred around 15 October 1941. Josef Bruha was "of interest" to the authorities because of his former involvement with the Republican Protection League. However, they seem to have decided quite early on (and probably wrongly) that he was not involved in recent resistance activism, and after four days he was released for "lack of evidence". If fellow detainees had known of his involvement, they had stayed silent over it. Antonia Bruha was detained, however.

== Under arrest ==
For two days following her arrest Bruha was held at the Gestapo headquarters in Vienna's Hotel Metropol in the Morzinplatz. Those first two days consisted of an unbroken series of interrogation sessions during which she was beaten "... with sticks. With all means possible". Soon after the interrogation began the infant Sonja was violently removed from her mother and taken away by a female member of the interrogation team. When Bruha moved to get her daughter back she was blocked, pushed and then beaten by two guards using their revolvers to hit her. For around a year the mother, whose parting memory was of Sonja's anguished yelling as she saw her mother beaten back by interrogators, was unaware of the child's fate. At least once she was told that her child was dead. Only after she had been transferred to Ravensbrück concentration camp, at least a year later, a fellow inmate would pass her a copy of a photograph sent by her husband from which she would be able to see that Sonja was alive. Then, on 8 October, she was placed in solitary confinement for around eight months in a building alongside the Elisabethpromenade in which the Gestapo were using the fourth floor. Her period of regular interrogations lasted around three months, during which time she was not permitted to change her clothes or wash herself. The sessions involved serious beatings which often left her unconscious. Sessions took place every two or three days. At the end of that she was required to sign both her own death warrant and those for twenty men and four women who had been in the resistance group with her.

It later transpired that after being taken from her mother Sonja had been taken to the "Vienna Child Transfer Office" ("Kinderübernahmestelle"). There the chief nurse, without any authorisation, had sent the child to a foster family. This meant that Josef Bruha would be able to maintain contact with her. For the Gestapo Sonja was valued chiefly as a means to apply pressure to her mother, forcing her to testify against resistance comrades. Sources insist that Bruha resisted the pressure, however, and never betrayed anyone, despite being uncertain of her daughter's fate throughout the interrogations period.

== Ravensbrück ==
In September/October 1942 Antonia briefly faced a tribunal before being returned to the jail in Vienna. In October 1942 she was transferred to the Ravensbrück concentration camp in the damp flat countryside to the north of Berlin. She was one of thirteen women from the Czech and Slovak resistance sent together from the Vienna area. One of them was her friend Irma Trksak, sister to Franz Narkowitz who had been a member of the Lobau team (and paid with his life for his involvement). The journey lasted around for weeks. She was accompanied by a "Rückkehr Unerwünscht" ("Do not send back") instruction, which amounted to a death sentence. Through the mediation of Hermi Jursa they remained together on arriving, accommodated in the "Political Block" in which Rosa Jochmann was "Block senior" ("Blockälteste"). Jochmann's leadership went some way to mitigate the horrors of concentration camp life and, above all, to encourage camp inmates to coordinate opposition to the SS personnel running the camp on behalf of the Nazi authorities. Inmates were also encouraged to display practical solidarity with political detainees, the old and the weak.

Invited to write a foreword to Toni Bruha's autobiography (1984), Rosa Jochmann instead wrote a letter in which she paid tribute to Antonia Bruha's contribution during the time they shared in Ravensbrück:

- "You were always there, risking your life to bring medications to the block, joining our friends to rescue Anny, Bertl, Mitzi, Hermi .. .many a life. Hundreds of times you stood with one foot in the grave; but the friendship was wonderful, there was no betrayal. You did everything and much more, always believing, knowling, that there must be an end, that such a horror could not have endured. You never lost hope, and through that you gave some the power to sustain their will to live"
- "Du warst immer da, brachtest Medikamente unter Lebensgefahr auf den Block, rettetest mit den Freundinnen Anny, Bertl, Mitzi, Hermi so manches Leben. ... Hunderte Male standest Du mit einem Fuß im Grab; aber die Freundschaft war wunderbar, es gab keinen Verrat. Das alles tatest Du und noch viel mehr, immer gläubig, wissend, dass es ein Ende geben musste, dass ein solches Grauen nicht Bestand haben konnte. Du hast niemals die Hoffnung verloren, und dadurch schenktest Du mancher die Kraft zum Weiterleben-Wollen"

At the start Toni Bruha was set to work pushing "Lore", heavy little trucks on rails, after which she was sent to join the "tailoring" workshop. The camp medical centre was her third workplace. Her experiences here were the most horrendous she faced in the concentration camp. Nevertheless, thanks to her language skills her secondment here was probably what saved her life. A camp doctor, faced with the challenge of investigating 200 newly arrived prisoners from Poland, asked for a simultaneous translator. Antonia Bruha filled the vacancy. When a camp commandant came to collect her for "liquidation", the doctor exploded, "I can shoot her for myself. [Right now] I still need her!" ("Erschiessen kann ich sie selber. Ich brauche sie noch!"). Bruha lived through numerous brutal crimes by the SS "gynaecologists", Rolf Rosenthal and Percival Treite: agonising pseudo-medical experiments on the legs of Polish women, forced sterilisations, murders of newborns and recruitments for forced sex work. And yet, she was able to risk her life by smuggling drugs to internees in the political block and by carefully switching index cards in the medical centre. As a message-courier for the medical centre Bruha was also able to contribute in other important ways to the forced labour regime operating inside the camp, acting on behalf of the illegal international camp committee. She was, for example, involved in rescuing Toni Lehr, Gerti Schindel and Edith Wexberg. These three Jewish communists activists arrived at Ravensbrück from Auschwitz: they faced death. Death was also a major risk for any inmate caught helping them. Nevertheless, for weeks, while the SS personnel tried to find them among the inmates, they were successfully hidden in ever changing locations, while a Yugoslav inmate who was also a doctor operated on the arms of two of them to remove numbers from Auschwitz. (The third of them was too ill, with Typhus, to face the hazards of an operation at this point.) In the end all three were kept away from the camp authorities until, shortly before the war ended, they were smuggled out in a Swedish Red-Cross transport.

As the Soviet army drew relentlessly closer from the east, a succession of so-called "evacuation marches" from the concentration camp at Ravensbrück set off on 28 April 1945, quickly becoming death marches. Those who could go no further were shot by the SS. Those too ill to march were simply left behind. Bertl Lauscher, Irma Trksak and Toni Bruha agreed that their best chance of survival would be to join one of the last columns to leave the camp, and then take the first opportunity to escape. By this point even the guards were simply running off, and the three succeeded in escaping through Poland and Czechoslovakia back to Vienna. The journey was not without adventure: it took them nearly four weeks to get home. Much of the city had been destroyed by bombs. The Bruhas' house was still standing, but it had no roof. Both with regard to family life and in respect of earning a living, re-establishing a "normal" existence presented huge challenges for the concentration camp survivors.

== After Ravensbrück ==
By the time she arrived home Toni Bruha weighed just 20 Kg (44 pounds). The baby snatched from her back in 1941 was a toddler a few weeks short of her fourth birthday. The reunion was a fiasco as the child complained to her carer, "Auntie, this ugly old woman says she is my mother. My mother in the photo is a beautiful blonde lady! Send this one back, that's not my Mum". It would be some time before something approaching a normal mother:daughter relationship could be established. During her first year at home Toni Bruha was permanently ill as a result of her treatment and the conditions at the concentration camp. Nevertheless, once Sonja had started school, in 1946 she took a job with the "Russian Hours" section at "Radio Vienna" service of the national broadcasting company (RAVAG), translating German texts into Russian and Czech. She remained with the radio station for approximately ten years. (The Soviet occupation of eastern Austria ended early in 1955, after which audiences for Russian language radio programmes were no longer present in significant numbers.) She also wrote contemporary history contributions for the book "Österreich April 1945" (produced by Franz Danimann und Hugo Pepper) as well as providing contributions to the press, notably for Vídeňské svobodné listy ("Vienna Free Sheets"), the newly established Czech language newspaper in Vienna.

== Against amnesia ==
Very soon after the collapse of Nazi Germany, Bruha was demonstrating a determination to ensure that the horrors of those times should not be forgotten. In 1947, as victim groups began to splinter along political lines, women who had survived the cells and concentration camps came together to form the "Austrian Ravensbrück Camp Community" ("Oesterreichische Lagergemeinschaft Ravensbrück"). Toni Bruha was one of the founders. Fifty years later, along with fellow survivors and supporters, she was able to look back on some of the achievements to which she had contributed: an Austrian Memorial space set up at Ravensbrück, a Ravensbrück exhibition during the 1960s which was staged successively in Vienna, Innsbruck, Klagenfurt, Salzburg and other population centres, an accompanying Exhibition Booklet on Ravensbrück, designed principally for young people, which reached 40,000 copies, the organisation in Austria of international Ravensbrück meetings and much more. Antonia Bruha was also engaged over many years as the meticulous treasurer of the "Austrian Ravensbrück Camp Community". Especially remarkable was her volunteer work after 1968 to create and built up the Ravensbrück Archive section in the Documents Centre of the Austrian Resistance. A collection of more than 800 files – documents, written memory pieces, trial documents covering the Ravensbrück and Uckermark concentration camps – provided and will continue to provide scholars and academics an important research resource.

Long before 1978, after which visits by contemporary witnesses to the Nazi horrors were included on school curricula and organised by the Ministry for Education, Antonia Bruha was making her own arrangements to speak to groups of young people about her resistance and concentration camp experiences. She believed these presentations were hugely important. Her lively and direct narrative style penetrated the hearts of many young listeners and inspired the political and personal commitment in new generations, necessary to avoid any tragic repeat of those Nazi years. She also backed up her message with written contributions to magazines and newspapers. Finally, in 1984, her autobiography, "Ich war keine Heldin" ("I was no heroine"), appeared. Its focus was on the period between her arrest and the reunion with her daughter, four years later.

By the time she addressed the annual "Austrian Ravensbrück Camp Community" meeting as a ninety year old Antonia Bruha was suffering badly with Diabetes and undergoing regular hospital stays, though friends insist that her willing assertiveness of an energetic commitment to democracy and freedom remained impressive. She died on 27 December 2006, some weeks short of what would have been her ninety-second birthday. Her body is entered in Vienna's misleadingly named Central Cemetery.
