= Elisabeth Holzleithner =

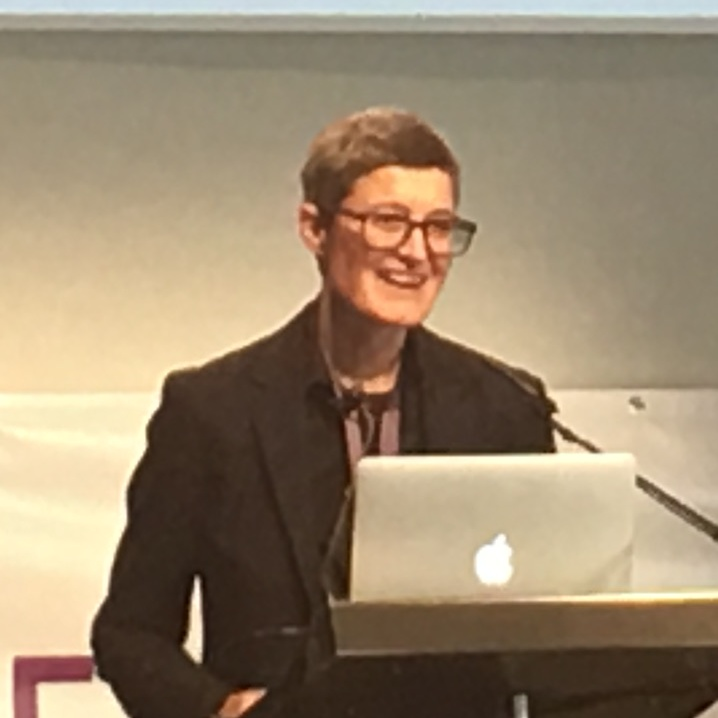
Elisabeth Holzleithner (2017)

Elisabeth Holzleithner (born 1970) is an Austrian university professor specializing in legal philosophy and gender studies at the University of Vienna where she heads the Institute of Legal Philosophy. Considered to be one of the leading scholars in the field of legal gender studies, she has received several awards including the Gabriele Possanner State Prize for Scientific Achievement in Gender Studies in 2017.

== Early life and education ==
Born in Baden bei Wien in 1970, Elisabeth Holzleithner studied law at the University of Vienna from 1988, receiving a master's degree in 1993. In 2000, with a thesis on Grenzziehungen. Pornographie, Recht und Moral (Borders, Pornography, Law and Morals) she earned a Ph.D. She received her habilitation in 2011 with a dissertation titled Dimensionen gleicher Freiheit. Recht und Politik zwischen Toleranz und Multikulturalismus (Dimensions of Equal Freedom. Law and Politics between Tolerance and Multiculturalism).

== Career ==
Since October 2014, Holzleithner has been professor of legal philosophy and legal gender studies at the University of Vienna's Institute for Legal Philosophy, Religious and Cultural Law (Institut für Rechtsphilosophie, Religions- und Kulturrecht). She also heads the research platform Gender: Ambivalent In_Visibilities. She serves on the board of editors of journals including Gender, Rechtsphilosophie (Legal Philosophy) and Zeitschrift für Menschenrechte (Human Rights Journal).

With a focus on human rights and theories of justice as well as legal philosophy, legal gender and queer studies, she has recently published Rechtsphilosophie Einführung in die Rechtswissenschaften und ihre Methoden: Teil III (Legal Philosophy: Introduction to Legal Science and its Methods. Part III).

== Awards ==
In 2017, Holzleithner was awarded the Gabriele Possanner State Prize for Scientific Achievement in Gender Studies. Also in 2017, she received the Austrian Frauenring Prize for Commitment to Women's Issues and Services to Gender Equality.
