= Sieglinde Rosenberger =

Austrian professor (born 1957)

Sieglinde Katharina Rosenberger (born 21 January 1957 in Wippenham) is an Austrian political scientist. She is Professor Emeritus of Political Science at the University of Vienna and was president of the Austrian Political Science Association from 2006 to 2007. She is known for her research on issues of democracy, migration and integration, asylum, Austrian politics and Europeanisation, governance and diversity, and political participation and protest. She heads the research group "Politics of Inclusion and Exclusion" and is deputy chair of the research platform "Religion and Transformation in European Societies", both at the University of Vienna. She is a member of the Expert Council of the German Foundations on Integration and Migration. She was the vice dean of the Faculty of Social Sciences of the University of Vienna 2016–2018.

Rosenberger earned her PhD in 1989 with the dissertation Frauenfragen oder Geschlechterfragen: institutionelle Frauenpolitik in Österreich. She became professor of political science at the University of Vienna in 1998 and was director of the Institute of Political Science from 2004 to 2007. She was a Schumpeter Fellow at Harvard University from 2003 to 2004, a visiting professor at the European University Institute in Florence in 2007 and a visiting professor at the China University of Political Science and Law in Beijing in 2014.

She received the Vienna Women's Prize in 2005, the Käthe Leichter Prize and the Science Prize of the Austrian Parliament, both in 2013. In 2018 she received the State Prize of Vienna, the "Goldenes Ehrenzeichen für Verdienste um das Land Wien".
