= Johanna Pirker =

Austrian computer scientist, educator, and game designer

- Johanna Pirker in 2019
- Born: Graz, Austria
- Education: Graz University of Technology
- Known for: Virtual Reality, Games Research
- Awards: Forbes 30 Under 30, Hedy Lamarr Award 2021
- Scientific career
- Fields: Virtual reality|Human-Computer Interaction
- Workplaces: Technical University of Munich|Graz University of Technology|LMU Munich|Massachusetts Institute of Technology|ETH Zurich
- Website: Johanna Pirker

Johanna Pirker (born June 26, 1988) is an Austrian computer scientist, educator, and game designer at Graz University of Technology and professor at the Technical University of Munich with a focus on games research, virtual reality and data science. Pirker was listed on the Forbes 30 under 30 Europe list in the category Science & Healthcare (2018) for her efforts in improving digital education with virtual reality environments and games. She holds a Ph.D. in Computer Science. Her dissertation was supervised by the Austrian e-learning expert Christian Gütl and MIT professor of physics John Winston Belcher. She is involved in various efforts to educate about the potential of video games. This also includes efforts to advocate the background and cultural aspect of video games. In 2020 she received the Käthe-Leichter Prize for her efforts for her initiatives in the field of diversity in engineering and in the games industry. In 2021, she received the Hedy Lamarr Prize.

In 2022, she was nominated as a member of the founding convention of the Institute of Digital Sciences Austria (IDSA), which is involved in the establishment of the new Technical University in Linz.

Since 2024, she has been a member of the Austrian Council for Research, Science, Innovation, and Technology Development (FORWIT).

In 2026, she was appointed as a member of the UN Independent International Scientific Panel on AI.

Johanna Pirker is active as a science communicator who shares insights on computer science and game development through her YouTube Channel and as a Twitch partner (JoeyPrink).

== Awards and prizes ==
Pirker received multiple awards including a listing on the Forbes 30 under 30 Europe list for her research and development efforts in the field of virtual reality for learning applications.

- Forbes 30 under 30 Europe, Science & Healthcare (2018)
- IGDA Women in Games Ambassador, GDC (2017)
- Women in Tech Award by Futurezone (2019)
- Käthe-Leichter-Prize (2020)
- Hedy Lamarr Prize (2021)
