= Friederike Hassauer =

Friederike Hassauer (29 November 1951 – 2 December 2021) was a German literary scholar and professor for Romance Philology at the University of Vienna. The focus of her work was on French and Spanish literature, along with Media studies. She is considered a pioneer of gender research in the field of Romance studies.

== Biography ==
Friederike Hassauer was born in Würzburg at a time when the city was still recovering from the destructive impact of a war which had seen its centre destroyed by fire bombs during a half hour intensive air attack in 1945 and its population approximately halved between 1939 and 1945. Between 1971 and 1975 she studied Romance studies, Germanistics, Comparative literature, Philosophy, Sociology and Art History at Würzburg, Tübingen and Washington University in St. Louis. She received a Master's degree from Washington University in St. Louis. Between 1978 and 1980 she was supported by a dissertation bursary from the German Academic Scholarship Foundation ("Studienstiftung des deutschen Volkes"). Following periods of study successively at Paris, Madrid, Salamanca, Siena and Perugia, she received her doctorate from Ruhr University Bochum. Her dissertation explored eighteenth century fable in the context of the French enlightenment. Her habilitation – this time from the nearby University of Siegen, followed in 1988. This time her topic was the history of popular depictions of the Medieval Pilgrim routes to Santiago. In 1991 she was appointed Professor of Romance Philology at the University of Vienna, a position she held until her retirement in 2020. She died on December 2, 2021, in her hometown Würzburg.

Together with her partner, the writer and author Peter Roos, she has realised several book and documentary film projects. Until recently, she also published essays for the German and Austrian quality press, notably for Der Spiegel, Die Zeit, Der Standard and the Frankfurter Allgemeine Zeitung.

== Work ==
Hassauer's research, teaching and publications concern Media theory and history along with Literature theory and history. Her cultural studies involving gender research concentrate on France and Spain during the period between the Middles Ages and the Nineteenth century and on the plaints ("Querela") of Women in the culturally Latin regions during that period. 2008 saw the publication of her collection on Women's plaints under then title "Heißer Streit und kalte Ordnung" (loosely: Heated conflicts and cool order), containing researches and explorations by 21 authors in Spain and Latin America. It received positive reviews, notably from Frank-Rutger Hausmann who thought it "brilliant … both in approach and in content".

== Awards ==
- 1980 Dissertation prize from the University of Bochum
- 1998 Medal for Merit from the University of Konstanz
