= Ina Wagner =

Austrian physicist, computer scientist, sociologist and university teacher

Ina Wagner (born 1946) is an Austrian physicist, computer scientist and social scientist. She is an emeritus professor of computer science at TU Wien (Vienna), where she was active from 1987 until 2011.

Wagner completed a doctorate in nuclear physics at the University of Vienna in 1972. In 1979 she received her habilitation in education sciences from the University of Klagenfurt, and in 1998 completed a second habilitation in "multidisciplinary design and computer-supported cooperative work" in Vienna. In 1987 she became the TU Wien's second ever female professor and the first to be appointed from outside the university, and led the Institute for Design & Assessment of Technology until her retirement in 2011.

In 2011 Wagner received the Gabriele Possanner State Prize, an award given by the Austrian science ministry for gender studies, and the city of Vienna's Women's Award. She is a current member of the Austrian Chancellery's bioethics commission and a former member of the European Group on Ethics in Science and New Technologies.
