= Hrádek (Znojmo District) =

- Municipality
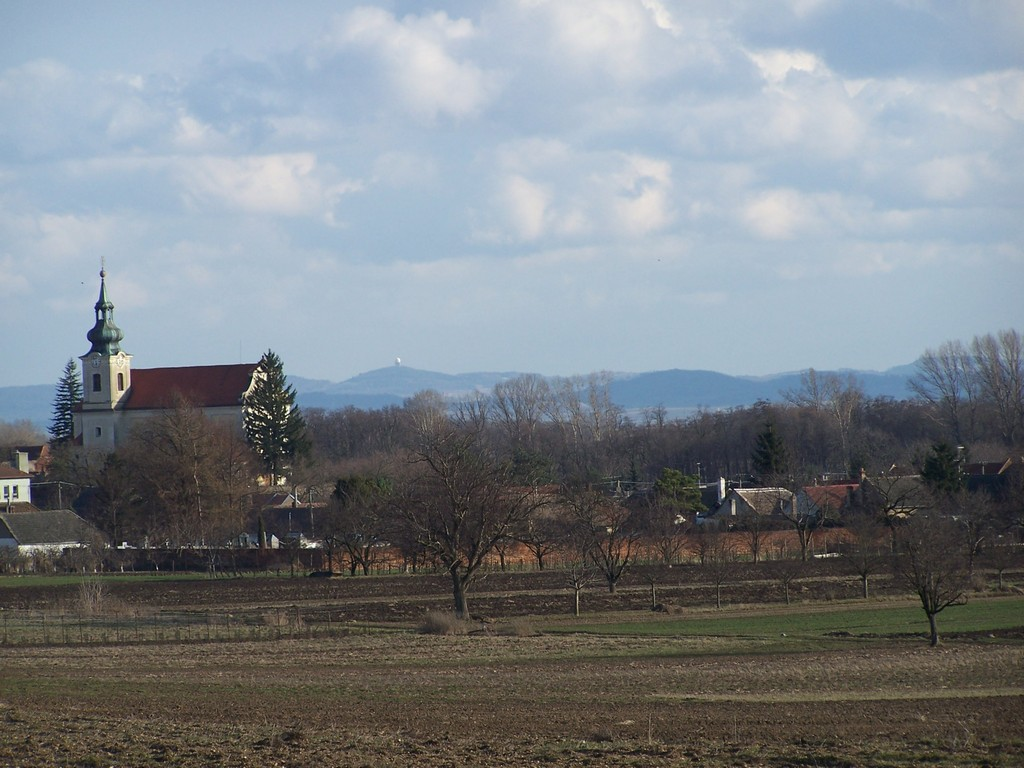
- Hrádek with Church of Saints Peter and Paul

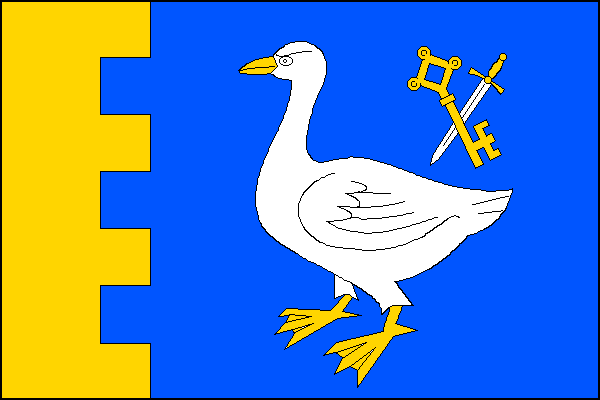
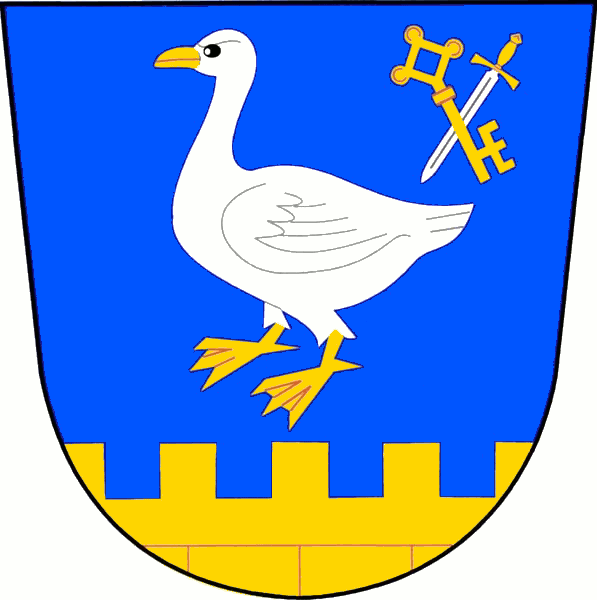
- Flag Coat of arms

- Location in the Czech Republic
- Coordinates: 48°46′22″N 16°16′5″E
- Country: Czech Republic
- Region: South Moravian
- District: Znojmo
- First mentioned: 1046

Area
  - Total: 21.69 km^{2} (8.37 sq mi)
- Elevation: 200 m (660 ft)

Population (2026-01-01)
  - Total: 992
  - Density: 45.7/km^{2} (118/sq mi)
- Time zone: UTC+1 (CET)
  - Summer (DST): UTC+2 (CEST)
- Postal code: 671 27
- Website: www.obec-hradek.cz

Hrádek is a municipality and village in Znojmo District in the South Moravian Region of the Czech Republic. It has about 1,000 inhabitants.

Hrádek lies approximately 20 kilometres (12 mi) south-east of Znojmo, 54 km (34 mi) south-west of Brno, and 199 km (124 mi) south-east of Prague.

== Demographics ==
Historical population
Year	Pop.	±%
1869	1,900	—
1880	2,039	+7.3%
1890	2,044	+0.2%
1900	2,035	−0.4%
1910	2,168	+6.5%
1921	2,264	+4.4%
1930	2,238	−1.1%
1950	984	−56.0%
1961	1,126	+14.4%
1970	1,041	−7.5%
1980	972	−6.6%
1991	840	−13.6%
2001	923	+9.9%
2011	890	−3.6%
2021	917	+3.0%
Source: Censuses
