= Franz Danimann =

Franz Danimann (30 July 1919 – 1 June 2013) was an Austrian lawyer, author and former resistance fighter against National Socialism. He belonged to the underground camp resistance in the Auschwitz concentration camp. He had been raised in a Social Democratic household in Vienna.
