= Johanna Dohnal =

Austrian politician (1939–2010)

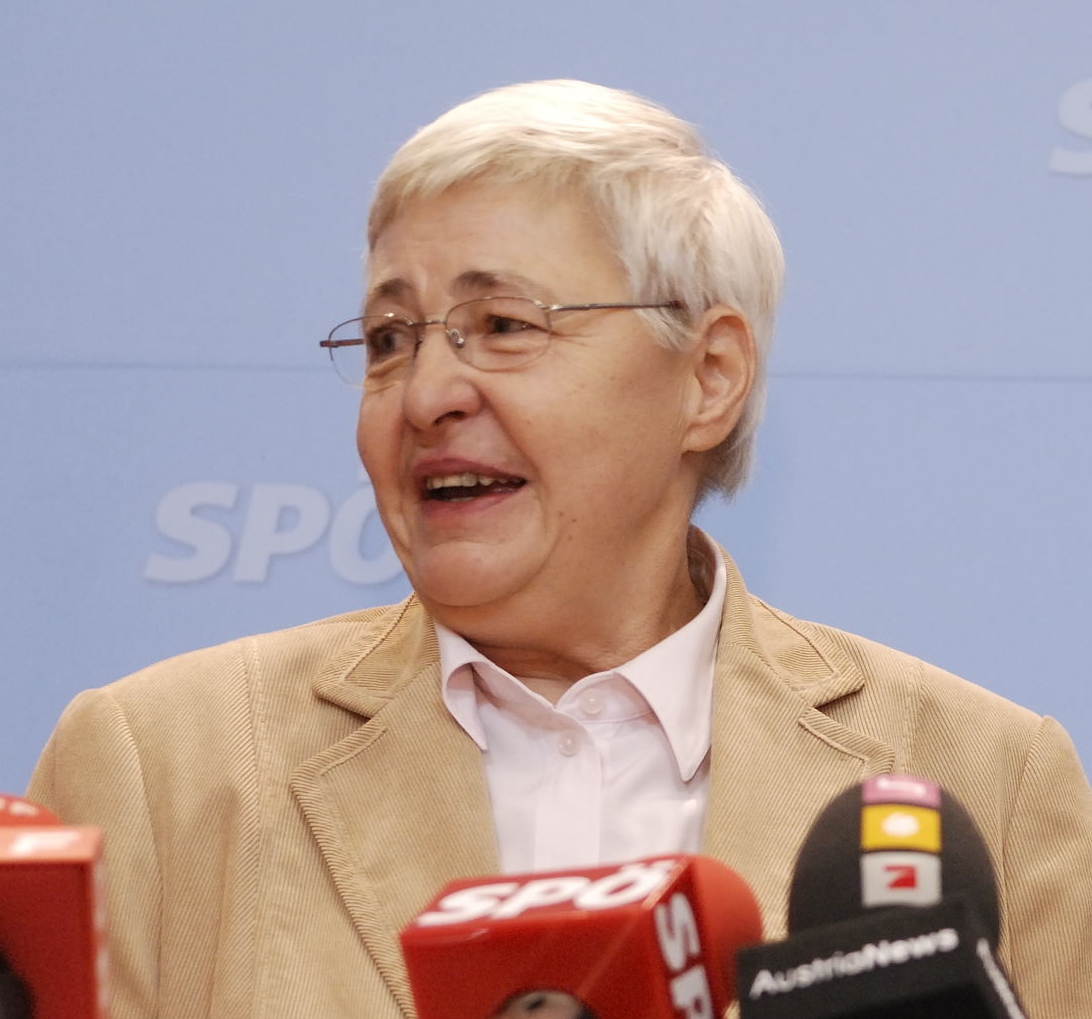
Dohnal in 2007

Johanna Dohnal (14 February 1939 – 20 February 2010) was an Austrian politician and the first Austrian Minister for Women.

== Personal life ==
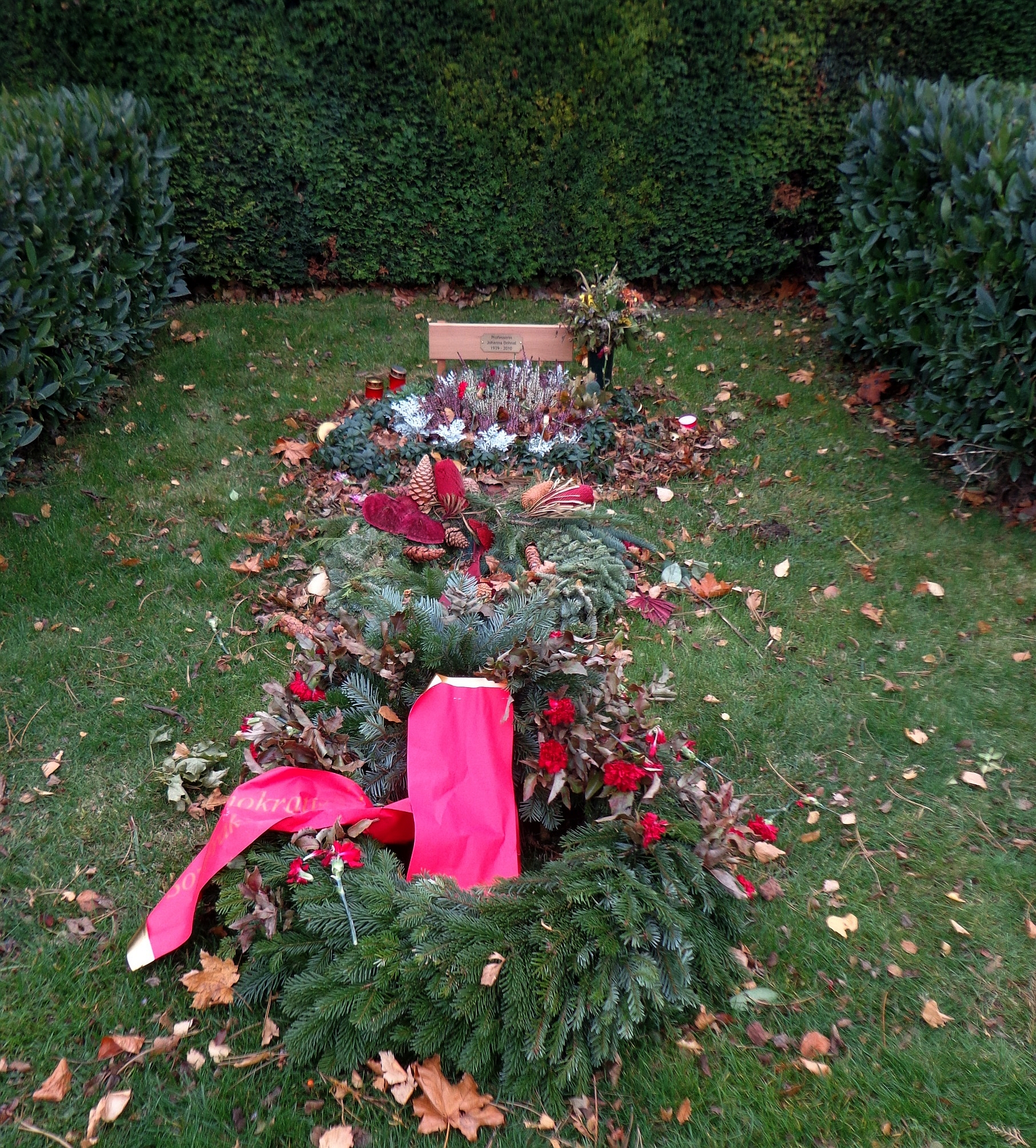
Dohnal's Ehrengrab in Vienna Central Cemetery

Dohnal was born in Vienna on 14 February 1939, to a single mother.

On 22 January 2010, she entered into a civil partnership with her long-standing partner Annemarie Aufreiter.

She died on 20 February 2010, at her home in Grabern, Lower Austria and is commemorated in a grave of honor (German: Ehrengrab) in Vienna Central Cemetery.

== Recognition ==
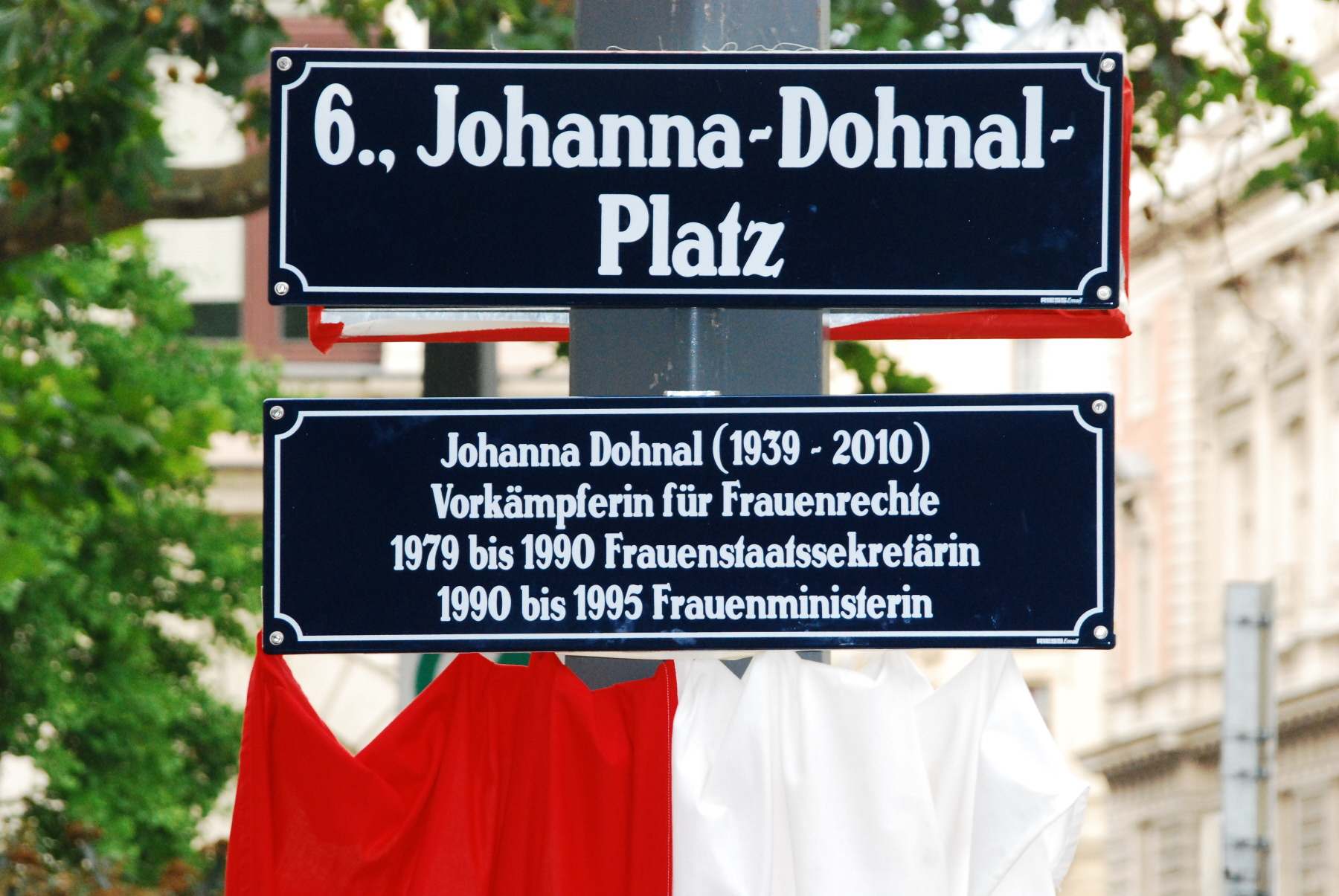
Johnna Dohnal Platz in Vienna 6

Johanna Dohnal Platz in Vienna 6 was named in her honour in 2012.

== Selected publications ==
- Johanna Dohnal: ein politisches Lesebuch. Mandelbaum-Verlag. 2013. ISBN 9783854764076.
