= Eva Cyba =

Austrian sociologist (born 1943)

Eva Cyba (born 1943 in Linz) is an Austrian sociologist. Her research, teaching and publications focus on sociological theories of social inequality, feminist theories and women's studies, in particular women in the world of work. She is the winner of the Käthe-Leichter-Staatspreis. Her book Gender and Social Inequality is considered a fundamental work of sociological gender research.

== Life ==
Eva Cyba studied sociology, philosophy and art history at the University of Vienna. In 1976 she was honoured with a dissertation on Political activities and study situations: An Empirical Study at the University of Vienna doctorate. She habilitated in 1999 with the publication Konstellationen der Frauenbenachteiligung: Reproduction Processes of Gender Inequalities, which was published as a book in 2000.

From 1983 to 1995 she was assistant professor in the Department of Sociology at the Institute for Advanced Studies and Scientific Research in Vienna. From 1987 to 1991 she was vice-president and from 1988 to 1995 spokesperson of the Women's Studies Section of the Austrian Sociological Association. From 1985 to 2006 she was editor of the Österreichische Zeitschrift für Soziologie (ÖZS) She was an executive member of the European Sociological Association (ESA) from 1995 to 1997 and from 2003 to 2005. (ESA) from 1995 to 2005 and was Convenor of the ESA Research Network "Gender Relations in the Labour Market and the Welfare State" from 1995 to 2005.

Eva Cyba is a lecturer at the Department of Sociology at the University of Vienna. She has been a guest lecturer at the Vienna University of Economics and Business and the universities of Linz and Salzburg.

== Award ==
In 1996, Eva Cyba received the Käthe-Leichter-Staatspreis, which is awarded "for outstanding achievements in the field of women's and gender studies in the social sciences, humanities and cultural sciences as well as for the women's movement and the establishment of gender equality."

== Selected publications ==
- Arbeitsbedingungen und Rationalisierung. In: Marina Fischer-Kowalski, Josef Buček (Hrsg.): Lebensverhältnisse in Österreich. Campus Verlag, Frankfurt/Main, New York 1980 (1982, 1986), ISBN 3-593-32691-4, S. 401–428.
- Schließungsstrategien und Abteilungsmythen: Die Praxis betrieblicher Diskriminierung von Frauen. In: Österreichische Zeitschrift für Soziologie, 1985
- Die verschleierte Diskriminierung im Betrieb. In: Lilo Unterkirchner, Ina Wagner (Hrsg.): Die andere Hälfte der Gesellschaft, ÖGB Verlag, Wien 1987, S. 126–134.
- Arbeitsbedingungen und berufliche Wertorientierungen. In: Werthaltungen und Lebensformen in Österreich. Ergebnisse des Sozialen Survey 1986. Oldenbourg, München, Verlag für Geschichte und Politik, Wien 1987, ISBN 3-486-54541-8 (Oldenbourg), S. 37–80.
- Frauen-Akteure im Sozialstaat. In: Österreichische Zeitschrift für Soziologie, 1991.
- Women's attitudes towards leisure and family. In: Loisir et Société/Society and Leisure. 15. Jg., Nr. 1, 1992, S. 78–94.
- Über die Klassenlage von Managern. In: Hans-Dieter Ganter (Hrsg.): Management aus soziologischer Sicht. Springer 1993
- Überlegungen zu einer Theorie geschlechtsspezifischer Ungleichheiten. In: Petra Frerichs, Margareta Steinrücke (Hrsg.): Soziale Ungleichheit und Geschlechterverhältnisse. Leske + Budrich, Opladen 1993, ISBN 978-3-8100-1072-8, S. 31–50.
- Aspekte der Benachteiligung. Institut für Höhere Studien, Wien 1994 (online). Enthält Sonderabdrucke von Beiträgen.
- Beharrung und Dialog. Feministische Perspektive und soziologische Ungleichheitsanalyse. In: Christof Armbruster, Ursula Müller, Marlies Stein-Hilbers (Hrsg.), Neue Horizonte?, Leske + Budrich, Opladen 1995, S. 157–170.
- Grenzen der Theorie sozialer Schließung? Die Erklärung von Ungleichheiten zwischen den Geschlechtern. In: Angelika Wetterer (Hrsg.): Die soziale Konstruktion von Geschlecht in Professionalisierungsprozessen. Lehrbuch, Campus Verlag 1995, ISBN 978-3-593-35289-3, S. 51–70.
- Modernisierung im Patriarchat? In: Rudolf G. Ardelt, Christian Gerbel (Hrsg.): Österreichischer Zeitgeschichtetag 1995. Österreich – 50 Jahre Zweite Republik, Studien Verlag, Wien 1996, S. 93 f.
- Das Geschlechterverhältnis: traditional, modern oder postmodern? In: Max Preglau, Rudolf Richter (Hrsg.): Postmodernes Österreich? Konturen des Wandels in Wirtschaft, Gesellschaft, Politik und Kultur. Facultas, Wien 1998, ISBN 3-85436-261-7, S. 155–174.
- Geschlechtsspezifische Arbeitsmarktsegmentation: von den Theorien des Arbeitsmarkt zur Analyse sozialer Ungleichheiten am Arbeitsmarkt, in: Birgit Geissler, Friederike Maier, Birgit Pfau-Effinger (Hrsg.): FrauenArbeitsMarkt: der Beitrag der Frauenforschung zur sozio-ökonomischen Theorieentwicklung, Berlin 1998
- Geschlecht und Soziale Ungleichheit. Konstellationen der Frauenbenachteiligung. Leske + Budrich, Opladen 2000.
- Mechanismen der Diskriminierung und Strategien ihrer Überwindung. In: Barbara Keller, Anina Mischau (Hrsg.): Frauen machen Karriere in Wissenschaft, Wirtschaft und Politik. Nomos, Baden-Baden 2002, ISBN 3-7890-7757-7, S. 31–48.
- Zusammen mit Andreas Balog: Die Erklärung sozialer Sachverhalte durch Mechanismen. In: Manfred Gabriel (Hrsg.): Paradigmen der akteurszentrierten Soziologie. VS, Wiesbaden 2004, ISBN 3-531-13895-2, S. 21–42.
- Zusammen mit Sabine Blaschke: Einstellungen zu Arbeit und Beruf? In: Max Haller (Hg.), Österreich zur Jahrhundertwende. Gesellschaftliche Werthaltungen 1986–2004, VS Verlag für Sozialwissenschaften, Wiesbaden 2005, S. 235–270.
- Social Inequality and Gender. In: Gender Issues and Social Science Education, 2/2005 (PDF; 36,4 kB).
- Patriarchat: Wandel und Aktualität. In: Ruth Becker, Beate Kortendiek (Hrsg.): Handbuch Frauen- und Geschlechterforschung. Theorie, Methoden, Empirie. 3. Auflage. VS Verlag für Sozialwissenschaften, Wiesbaden 2010, ISBN 978-3-531-17170-8.
- Ungleichheiten zwischen den Geschlechtern. Ursachen und Veränderungen. In: Monica Budowski, Michael Nollert (Hrsg.), Soziale Ungleichheiten, Seismo, Zürich: 2011, S. 3–56

Herausgeberschaft

- Mit Max Haller, Kurt Holm, Karl H. Müller, Wolfgang Schulz: Österreich im Wandel. Werte, Lebensformen und Lebensqualität 1986 bis 1993. Oldenbourg Wissenschaftsverlag, München 1996.
- Mit Jeanne de Bruijn: Gender and Organizations. Changing Perspectives – Theoretical Considerations and Empirical Findings. VU University Press, 1995.
