= Eduard Fuchs =

German historian (1870–1940)

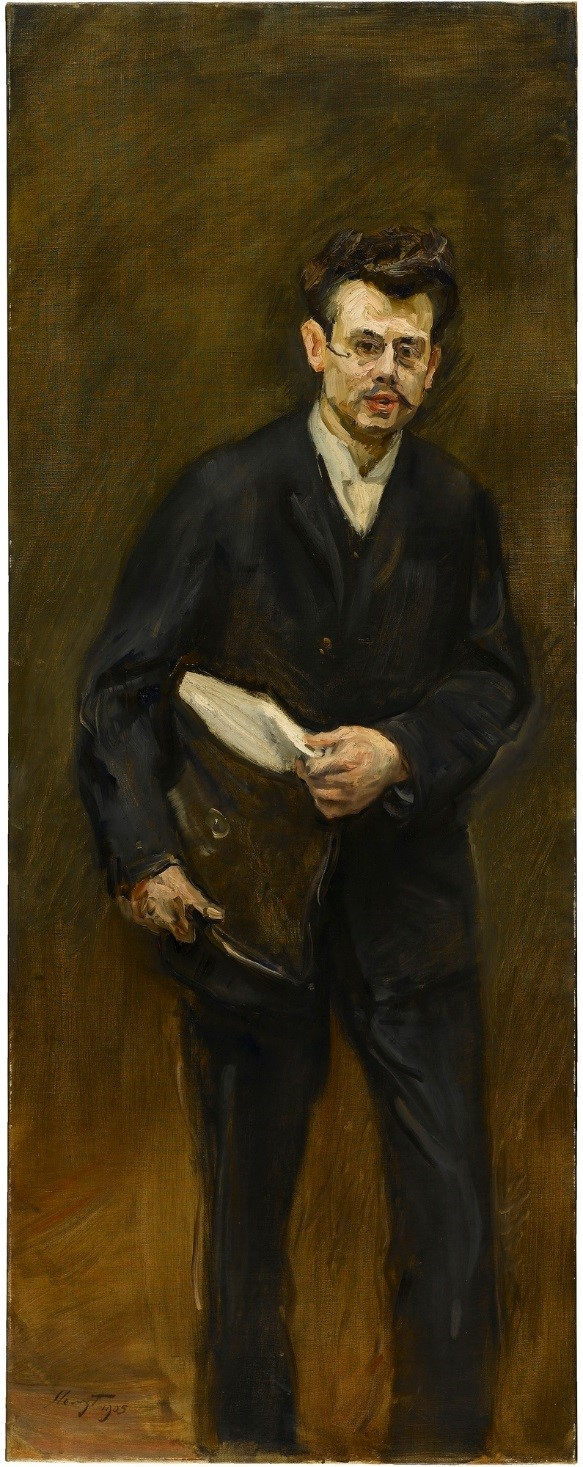
Painting portrait of Eduard Fuchs by Max Slevogt, 1905

Eduard Fuchs (31 January 1870 – 26 January 1940) was a German Marxist scholar of culture and history, writer, art collector, and political activist.

== Early life ==
Fuchs's father was a shopkeeper. Early in his life, the younger Fuchs developed socialist and Marxist political convictions. In 1886, he joined the outlawed political party Sozialistische Arbeiterpartei (the precursor of the modern SPD, Sozialdemokratische Partei Deutschlands). Fuchs received a doctor of law degree and practiced as an attorney. In 1892, he became editor-in-chief of the satiric weekly Süddeutscher Postillon and later co-editor of the Leipziger Volkszeitung.

== Political and literary activism ==
His inflammatory articles in newspapers—one accusing the Kaiser of being a mass murderer—resulted in periodic jail sentences. During his periods of confinement, Fuchs wrote various social histories utilizing images as one of his primary sources. The first of these was his Karikatur der europäischen Völker (Caricatures of European Peoples), 1902.

He moved to Berlin that same year where he edited the socialist newspaper Vorwärts. The following year he began his magnum opus, an examination of moral practice, Sittengeschichte, eventually running to six volumes by 1912. While engaged in this series, he followed up his interest in caricatures with one devoted to the representation of women, Die Frau in der Karikatur, 1905 (3 vols). Another book documenting the stereotypical representations of Jews appeared in 1912. Fuchs traveled with the artist Max Slevogt to Egypt in 1914, shortly before the outbreak of World War I. He was a pacifist during the War. Vladimir Lenin's government put him in charge of prisoner exchange with Germany after the war; he was among the leaders of the German Comintern in Berlin in 1919. Fuchs became a founding member of the Spartakus League and the Communist Party of Germany.

His interest in societal concerns in caricature led to a research interest in Daumier. Beginning in 1920, Fuchs published a catalogue raisonné on the artist in three volumes. Fuchs campaigned for Heinrich Brandler and his right opposition within the party. Fuchs resigned from the party in 1929, following the expulsion of Brandler, Thalheimer and several other stalwarts and subsequently joined the Communist Party of Germany (Opposition). At Adolf Hitler's ascension to power in Germany in 1933, Fuchs was, according to the New York Times, "violently attacked by the Nazi regime and because his second wife, the former Grete Alsberg, was a Jewess, had to flee Germany." Ironically, in his memoirs, publisher Ernst Hanfstaengel recalled that he had seen "slightly concealed" copies of Fuchs' The Illustrated History of Morals and The History of Erotic Art on Hitler's bookshelf when visiting the future dictator's domicile in Munich in the early 1920s.

== Art collector ==
By 1909, Fuchs owned 3,800 lithographs by Daumier in 1909 and By the end of the 1920s, he owned 6,000 prints, 21 paintings and 16 drawings by him. Fuchs also had in his collection 44 paintings and at least 10 watercolors by Max Slevogt, many acquired directly from the artist who was also his friend. Fuchs' collection included19 paintings by Max Liebermann as wella as majolica and porcelain and East Asian objects. Fuchs possessed the largest collection (120) of Chinese rooflights at that time. For his research he also had over twenty thousand drawings, prints, pamphlets and posters of moral histories.

Fuchs placed his collection in the "Villa Fuchs" which had been built by Mies van der Rohe in 1901 in Berlin-Zehlendorf.

== Nazi seizure of Fuchs' art collection ==
Fuchs and his wife, who was Jewish, escaped Nazi Germany in February 1933 via Schaffhausen, Strasbourg and Geneva to Paris. On 25 March 1933 a large-scale Gestapo operation took place at the Villa Fuchs, ostensibly to secure "communist evidence." On 25 October 1933 the Fuchs Collection was officially confiscated, the rooms sealed, and books, posters, and pamphlets taken away. On 26 October 1933 the furniture and the remaining art objects were seized the Zehlendorf tax office. Fuchs' books were banned, confiscated and partially burned.

== Exile and death ==
In exile in Paris, Fuchs was friends with Walter Benjamin, among others. Fuchs died on 26 January 1940; he was buried on 29 January 1940 in the Père Lachaise cemetery.

Fuchs was survived by his second wife Margarete - called Grete, also Margret Fuchs. She died in exile in New York City on 7 June 1953. His daughter Gertraud from his first marriage to Frida Fuchs (1876-1956) died on 19 May 1960.

== Provenance research into Margarete and Eduard Fuch's looted art collection ==
From February 2018 to February 2020 and May 2020 to April 2022, research projects were launched to try to reconstruct the history of the Fuchs collection which had been looted by the Nazis. A triptych by Max Slevogt, Der verlorene Sohn (The Prodigal Son), that had belonged to Fuch was restituted to his heirs by the Staatsgalerie Stuttgart which had received it as a gift from the German art collector Otto Stäbler.

== Works ==
- 1848 in der Caricatur. München: Ernst 1898
- Die ollen Griechen : Bilder zur Sage und Geschichte der Alten (mit Honoré Daumier). Berlin: A. Hoffman 1902
- Die Karikatur der europäischen Völker vom Altertum bis zur Neuzeit (mit Hans Kraemer). Berlin: A. Hoffman 1902
- Die Karikatur der europäischen Völker vom Jahre 1848 bis zur Gegenwart. Berlin: A. Hoffman 1903
- Das erotische Element in der Karikatur. Berlin: A. Hoffman 1904
- Die Frau in der Karikatur. München: Albert Langen 1906
- Richard Wagner in der Karikatur (mit Ernst Kreowski). München: Albert Langen 1907
- Geschichte der erotischen Kunst. Band 1: Das zeitgeschichtliche Problem. München: Albert Langen 1908
- Illustrierte Sittengeschichte vom Mittelalter bis zur Gegenwart, Band 1: Renaissance. München: Albert Langen 1909. Some images
- Illustrierte Sittengeschichte vom Mittelalter bis zur Gegenwart, Band 2: Die galante Zeit. München: Albert Langen 1911
- Illustrierte Sittengeschichte vom Mittelalter bis zur Gegenwart, Band 3: Das bürgerliche Zeitalter. München: Albert Langen 1912
- Die Weiberherrschaft in der Geschichte der Menschheit (mit Alfred Kind). Erster Band. München: Albert Langen 1913
- Die Weiberherrschaft in der Geschichte der Menschheit (mit Alfred Kind). Zweiter Band. München: Albert Langen 1913
- Die Weiberherrschaft in der Geschichte der Menschheit (mit Alfred Kind). Ergänzungsband. München: Albert Langen 1913
- Der Weltkrieg in der Karikatur. Bis zum Vorabend des Krieges. München: Albert Langen 1916
- Die Juden in der Karikatur: Ein Beitrage zur Kulturgeschichte. München: Albert Langen 1921
- Geschichte der erotischen Kunst. Band 2: Das individuelle Problem. Erster Teil. München: Albert Langen 1923
- Tang-Plastik: Chinesische Grabkeramik des VII. bis X. Jahrhunderts. München: Albert Langen, 1924
- Dachreiter und Verwandte: Chinesische Keramik des XV. bis XVIII. Jahrhunderts. München: A. Langen, 1924
- Gavarni. Hrsg. von Eduard Fuchs (mit Paul Gavarni). München: Albert Langen, 1925
- Geschichte der erotischen Kunst. Band 3: Das individuelle Problem. Zweiter Teil. München: Albert Langen 1926
- Honoré Daumier: Holzschnitte 1833–1872. München, A. Langen, 1927.
- Honoré Daumier: Lithographien 1828–1851. München, A. Langen, 1927
- Honoré Daumier: Lithographien 1852–1860. München, A. Langen, 1927.
- Honoré Daumier: Lithographien 1861–1872. München, A. Langen, 1927.
- Der Maler Daumier. München: Albert Langen 1930
- Die grossen Meister der Erotik: Ein Beitrag zum Problem des Schöpferischen in der Kunst; Malerei und Plastik. München: Albert Langen, 1931
