= Edith Saurer =

Austrian historian of modern age (1942–2011)

Edith Saurer (20 August 1942 – 5 April 2011) was an Austrian historian, university professor at the University of Vienna, scientific author, and publisher. She is regarded as a central cofounder and advocate of feminist historiography in Austria. She received the Käthe Leichter Prize, Gabriele Possanner State Prize, and the Golden Medal for her services to the State of Vienna.

== Early life and education ==
Edith Saurer was born on 20 August 1942 in Vienna. From 1960, she studied history, German language, and theater studies at the University of Vienna, earning a Ph.D. in 1966 with the work, Die politischen Aspekte der Bischofsernennungen in der Habsburgermonarchie 1867–1903 ("The political aspects of episcopal appointments in the Habsburg monarchy 1867-1903").

== Research and career ==
During the period of 1970 to 1983, she worked as a university assistant. Saurer habilitated in 1983 with the work, Materielle Kultur und sozialer Protest in der Lombardei, Venetien, Niederösterreich und Böhmen zwischen Vormärz und Neoabsolutismus ("Material Culture and Social Protest in Lombardy, Veneto, Lower Austria and Bohemia between Vormärz and Neoabsolutismus") and was then promoted to a position as a university lecturer. From 1992, she was a Professor of Modern History at the Department of History of the University of Vienna. She was also a visiting professor at Bielefeld University, Leipzig University, Università degli Studi di Napoli "L'Orientale", and the European University Institute.

In 1990, Saurer was the initiator and co-founder of the journal, L’Homme. Europäische Zeitschrift für Feministische Geschichtswissenschaft ("L'Homme. European Journal of Feminist History"), which since then has been her special commitment. From 1993 to 2000, she served as chair of the Commission of the Inter-University Coordination Office for Women's Studies. She was co-editor of the journal, Historische Anthropologie and Wiener Zeitschrift für die Geschichte der Neuzeit. Since 2006, Saurer led the research in re-localization of women's and gender history in the European context at the University of Vienna. Her research interests included the history of material culture, women and gender history, history of religion in the 18th-19th centuries, historical anthropology, and the history of Italy in the 19th century.

She died on 5 April 2011 in Vienna.

== Awards and honors ==
- 1991, Käthe-Leichter-Preis
- 1997, Gabriele Possanner State Prize
- 2010, Golden Medal for Services to the State of Vienna
- The Edith Saurer Fund for the Promotion of Historical Studies, which she founded, has awarded research grants since 2013.

== Selected works ==
- with Margareth Lanzinger (ed.): Ungleichheit an der Grenze. Historisch-anthropologische Spurensuche im alpinen Raum: Tret und St. Felix. Edition Raetia, Bozen 2010, ISBN 978-88-7283-373-5.
- with Christian Aspalter, Wolfgang Müller-Funk, Wendelin Schmidt-Dengler, Anton Tantner (ed.): Paradoxien der Romantik. Gesellschaft, Kultur und Wissenschaft in Wien im frühen 19. Jahrhundert. WUV, Wien 2006, ISBN 978-3-85114-817-6.
- with Margareth Lanzinger, Elisabeth Frysak: Women's Movements Networks and Debates in post-communist Countries in the 19th and the 20th Centuries. Böhlau, Köln/Weimar/Wien 2006, ISBN 3-412-32205-9.
- with Margarete Grandner: Geschlecht, Religion und Engagement. Die jüdischen Frauenbewegungen im deutschsprachigen Raum. Böhlau, Wien 2005, ISBN 3-412-32205-9.
- with Margarete Grandner (ed.): Die jüdischen Frauenbewegungen im deutschsprachigen Raum. Böhlau, Vienna 2004, ISBN 3-205-77259-8.
- with Christa Hämmerle (ed.): Briefkulturen und ihr Geschlecht. Zur Geschichte der privaten Korrespondenz vom 16. Jahrhundert bis heute. Böhlau, Vienna 2003, ISBN 3-205-99398-5.
- with Heinrich Berger, Gerhard Botz (ed.): Otto Leichter. Briefe ohne Antwort. Aufzeichnungen aus dem Pariser Exil 1938-1939. Böhlau, Vienna 2003, ISBN 3-205-77051-X.
- with Birgit Wagner (ed.): Eine Mauer im Mittelmeer. Debatten um den Status des Fremden von der Antike bis zur Gegenwart. WUV-Facultas, Vienna 2003, ISBN 3-85114-670-0.
- with Waltraud Heindl (ed.): Grenze und Staat. Passwesen, Staatsbürgerschaft, Heimatrecht und Fremdengesetzgebung in der österreichischen Monarchie (1750–1867). Böhlau, Vienna 2000, ISBN 3-205-99199-0.
- Liebe und Arbeit. Geschlechterbeziehungen im 19. und 20. Jahrhundert. Fischer-Taschenbuch-Verlag, Frankfurt am Main 1997 (Überarbeitete Neuausgabe: Böhlau, Vienna 2014, ISBN 978-3-205-79535-3).
- with Heide Dienst (ed.): „Das Weib existiert nicht für sich.“ Geschlechterbeziehungen in der bürgerlichen Gesellschaft. Verlag für Gesellschaftskritik, Vienna 1990, ISBN 3-85115-123-2.
- Straße, Schmuggel, Lottospiel. Materielle Kultur und Staat in Niederösterreich, Böhmen und Lombardo-Venetien im frühen 19.Jahrhundert. Vandenhoeck & Ruprecht, Göttingen 1989, ISBN 3-525-35626-9.
- with Gernot Heiß (ed.): Willfährige Wissenschaft. Die Universität Wien 1938–1945. Verlag für Gesellschaftskritik, Vienna 1989, ISBN 3-85115-107-0.
- Projektgruppe Kritische Universitätsgeschichte (ed.): Vernunft als Institution? Geschichte und Zukunft der Universität. Vienna 1986, ISBN 3-85443-011-6.
- Die politischen Aspekte der österreichischen Bischofsernennungen 1867–1903. Herold, Vienna 1968.
