= Eva Kreisky =

Austrian political scientist and jurist (1944–2024)

Hannelore Eva Kreisky (née Zgraja; 8 September 1944 – 14 August 2024) was an Austrian political scientist and jurist.

== Biography ==
Born on 8 September 1944, Kreisky earned a doctorate in law at the University of Vienna in 1971, and studied political science at the Institut für Höhere Studien in Vienna, where she worked from 1972. She became head of department for the Department of Political Science in 1979, and earned her Habilitation in 1986–87. From 1989 to 1993, she was Professor of political science, in particular women's studies, at the Free University of Berlin. She was Visiting Professor of Gender Studies at the University of Vienna from 1993, and became Professor there in 1995. She became a member of the council of the University of Innsbruck in 2007.

Kreisky is known for her research on state theory, theory of bureaucracy, feminism, political theory, and the history of ideas.

Eva Kreisky was married to the late political scientist Peter Kreisky, and the daughter-in-law of Chancellor Bruno Kreisky. She died on 14 August 2024, at the age of 79.

== Awards ==
- 1999 Gabriele Possanner State Prize

== Publications ==
- Feministische Standpunkte in der Politikwissenschaft : eine Einführung, 1995
- Vom patriarchalen Staatssozialismus zur patriarchalen Demokratie, 1996
- Das geheime Glossar der Politikwissenschaft : geschlechtskritische Inspektion der Kategorien einer Disziplin, 1997
- Geschlechterverhältnisse im Kontext politischer Transformation, 1998
- Geschlecht und Eigensinn : feministische Recherchen in der Politikwissenschaft, 1998
- Arena der Männlichkeit : über das Verhältnis von Fussball und Geschlecht, 2006
- Theoriearbeit in der Politikwissenschaft, 2011
- Dauerkämpfe Feministische Zeitdiagnosen und Strategien, 2017
- Jüdische Identitäten und antisemitische Politiken im österreichischen Parlament 1861-1933, 2017
