= Frank-Rutger Hausmann =

German romanist and historian

Frank-Rutger Hausmann (born 5 February 1943) is a German Romanist and historian.

== Life and career ==
Hausmann was born in Hanover in 1943, the son of the military doctor Hans Hausmann. After graduating from the neo-linguistic Städtisches Gymnasium Gummersbach in 1962, he studied law, Romance languages and literature, history and Medieval Latin Philology in Göttingen and Freiburg, where he received his doctorate in 1968 under Vito Rocco Giustiniani with a thesis on the Italian humanist and bishop Giovanni Antonio Campano. In 1974, he also completed his habilitation in Freiburg. In 1976 he was appointed to a position as Scientific Council. In 1981 he accepted a call to the RWTH Aachen. In 1992, Hausmann was appointed Professor of Romance literary studies at the Albert-Ludwigs-Universität Freiburg. In the 1999/2000 academic year, Hausmann was a research fellow at the Historisches Kolleg in Munich. He retired in 2006.

Hausmann's research focuses on French and Italian literature, the history of the humanities and the history of National Socialism. Hausmann is a co-editor of writings on the history of science and universities. He has been awarded numerous academic honours and memberships for his research. In 1997, he became a member of the Akademie gemeinnützige Wissenschaften zu Erfurt and in 2004 a full member of the Heidelberg Academy of Sciences and Humanities. He was awarded the Order of Merit of the Federal Republic of Germany on ribbon in 2000.

== Publications ==
- Ernst Robert Curtius. Briefe aus einem halben Jahrhundert. Eine Auswahl. Published and annotated by Frank Rutger Hausmann. (saecvla spiritalia 49) Koerner, Baden-Baden 2015, ISBN 978-3-87320-449-2
- Die Geisteswissenschaften im "Dritten Reich". Klostermann, Frankfurt 2011, ISBN 978-3-465-04107-8.
- Das Fach Mittellateinische Philologie an deutschen Universitäten von 1930 bis 1950 (Quellen und Untersuchungen zur lateinischen Philologie des Mittelalters. Bd. 16). Hiersemann, Stuttgart 2010, ISBN 978-3-7772-1005-6.
- Ernst Wilhelm Bohle. Gauleiter im Dienst von Partei und Staat (Zeitgeschichtliche Forschungen. 38). Duncker & Humblot, Berlin 2009, ISBN 978-3-428-12862-4.
- L.-F. Céline et Karl Epting. Édition établie par Anna Istratova. Le Bulletin célinien, Brüssel 2008, ISBN 978-2-9600106-2-6.
- Hans Bender (1907–1991) und das "Institut für Psychologie und Klinische Psychologie" an der Reichsuniversität Straßburg 1941–1944 (Grenzüberschreitungen. Bd. 4). Ergon-Verlag, Würzburg 2006, ISBN 3-89913-530-X.
- "Dichte, Dichter, tage nicht!" Die Europäische Schriftsteller-Vereinigung in Weimar 1941–1948. Klostermann, Frankfurt, 2004, ISBN 3-465-03295-0.
- Anglistik und Amerikanistik im "Dritten Reich". Klostermann, Frankfurt, 2003, ISBN 3-465-03230-6.
- (ed.): Die Rolle der Geisteswissenschaften im Dritten Reich 1933–45 (Schriften des Historischen Kollegs. Kolloquien 53). Munich 2002, XXV, 373 p. ISBN 978-3-486-56639-0 (Numerized).
- Auch im Krieg schweigen die Musen nicht. Die Deutschen Wissenschaftlichen Institute im Zweiten Weltkrieg (Veröffentlichungen des Max-Planck-Instituts für Geschichte. 169). Vandenhoeck & Ruprecht, Göttingen 2001, ISBN 3-525-35357-X.
- "Vom Strudel der Ereignisse verschlungen". Deutsche Romanistik im „Dritten Reich“ (Analecta Romanica. 61). Klostermann, Frankfurt, 2000, ISBN 3-465-03116-4 (2nd, reviewed and updated edition. ebenda 2008, ISBN 978-3-465-03584-8).
- "Deutsche Geisteswissenschaft" im Zweiten Weltkrieg. Die „Aktion Ritterbusch“ (1940–1945) (Schriften zur Wissenschafts- und Universitätsgeschichte. 1). Dresden University Press, Dresden u. a. 1998, ISBN 3-933168-10-4 (Studien zur Wissenschafts- und Universitätsgeschichte. 12). 3., erweiterte Ausgabe. Synchron, Heidelberg 2007, ISBN 978-3-935025-98-0).
- Französische Renaissance. Metzler, Stuttgart among others 1997, ISBN 3-476-01521-1.
- Französisches Mittelalter. Metzler, Stuttgart among others 1996, ISBN 3-476-01422-3.
- Zwischen Autobiographie und Biographie. Jugend und Ausbildung des fränkisch-Oberpfälzer Philologen und Kontroverstheologen Kaspar Schoppe (1576–1649). Königshausen & Neumann, Würzburg 1995, ISBN 3-8260-1052-3.
- Nachwort in: François Rabelais: Gargantua (Reclams Universal-Bibliothek. Nr. 8764). Translated and annotated by Wolf Steinsieck. Reclam, Stuttgart 1992, ISBN 3-15-008764-3 (Reviewed edition. ibid. 1999).
- François Rabelais (Sammlung Metzler. M 176. Abt. D: Literaturgeschichte). Metzler, Stuttgart 1979, ISBN 3-476-10176-2.
- Giovanni Antonio Campano (1429–1477). Erläuterungen und Ergänzungen zu seinen Briefen. Freiburg, Univ., Diss., 1968 (unpublished manuscript).
