= Viktoria Schmidt-Linsenhoff =

German art historian (1944–2013)

Viktoria Schmidt-Linsenhoff (21 August 1944 – 14 February 2013) was a German art historian and professor with particular research interest in the fields of gender studies and postcolonial studies.

== Early life and education ==
Viktoria Schmidt-Linsenhoff was born on 21 August 1944 in Cottbus.

She studied Art History, Classical Archeology and Modern German Literature. In 1973, she received her doctorate from Erich Hubala at the University of Kiel with a thesis on Guido Reni. A one-year apprenticeship enabled her to become a curator in the painting and graphic collection of the Historical Museum, Frankfurt.

== Research and career ==
From 1986 to 1991, Schmidt-Linsenhoff was co-editor of the art journal Kritische Berichte. In 1990, she did a substitute professorship at the University of Oldenburg, and in 1992, a collaboration at the Institute of Cultural Studies Essen. Schmidt-Linsenhoff became Professor of Art History at the University of Trier with a focus on women's research from 1992 until her retirement in 2008.

From 2001 to 2004, Schmidt-Linsenhoff initially took on the Käthe Leichter Visiting Professorship at the University of Vienna before teaching at the University of Cotonou in Benin. This was followed by a stay in the United States as a visiting professor at Dartmouth College. The Center for Postcolonial and Gender Studies (CePoG) was founded at University of Trier on her initiative in 2005 and she remained on its advisory board until her death. It institutionalized interdisciplinary research, which now also includes the course "Intercultural Gender Studies". Schmidt-Linsenhoff research projects included:

- 1997–2000, DFG project "The subject and the others" regarding interculturality and gender difference from the early modern period to the present
- 1999–2002, Member of the Research Group Feminism and Enlightenment 1650-1850: a Comparative History at the University of London
- 2000–2006, spokeswoman for the Research Training Group Identity and Difference regarding gender construction and interculturality during the period of 18th-20th centuries
- 2004–2013, member of the graduate school program, "Sklaverei, Knechtschaft und Fronarbeit, Zwangsarbeit"
- 2005–2013, Center for Postcolonial and Gender Studies at the University of Trier (founding member and management)

In 2008, together with her partner, the filmmaker Dieter Reifarth, she directed the film The Court. This is a documentary about the farm of the Senegalese artist Joe Ouakam, known as Issa Samb.

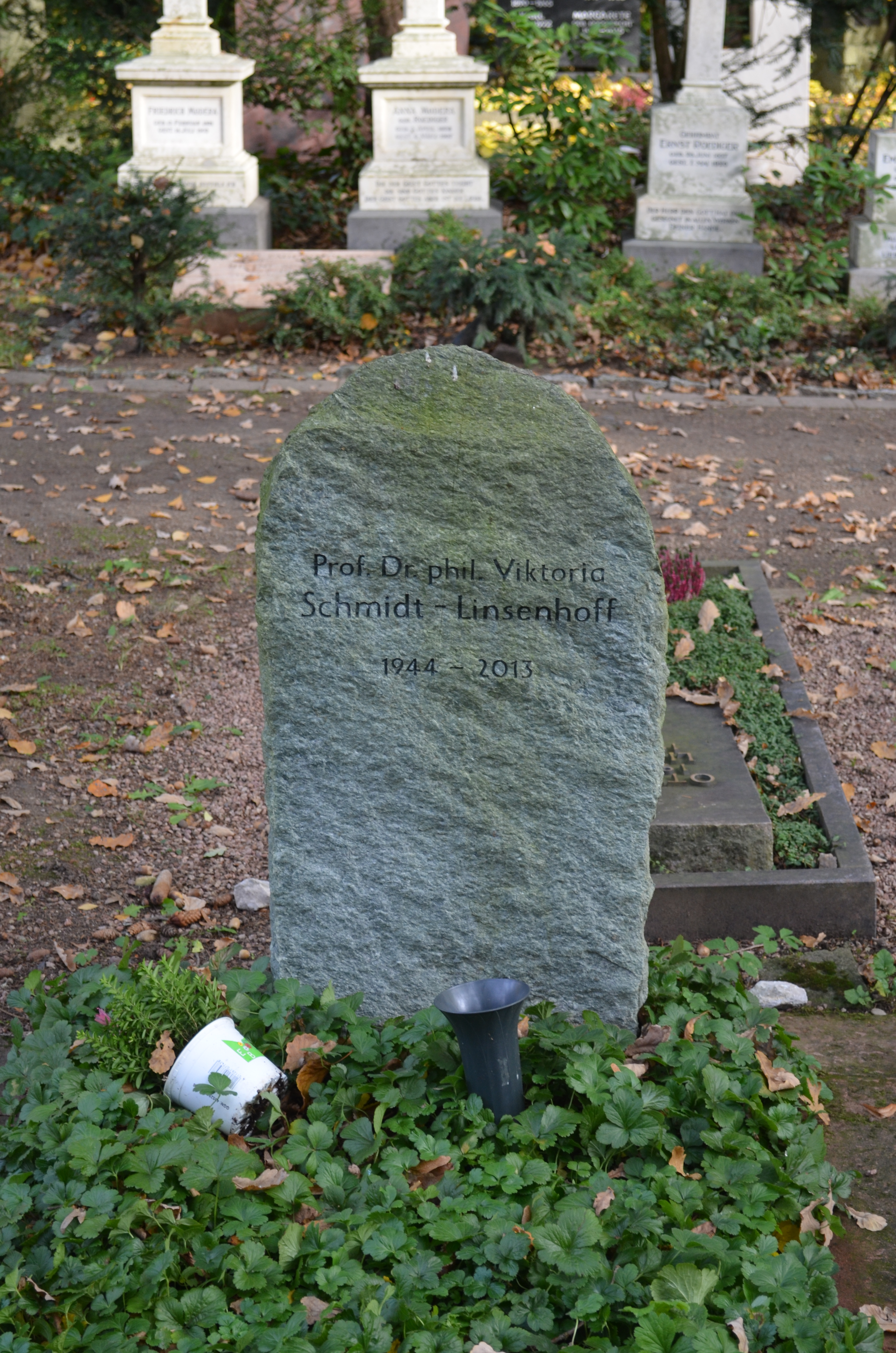
Headstone

She died on 14 February 2013 in Frankfurt.

== Filmography ==
- La Cour - Der Hof, Director: Dieter Reifarth; Viktoria Schmidt-Linsenhoff; Documentary, 2012, Germany / Senegal, 85 min

== Selected works ==
- Guido Reni in the judgment of the 17th century. Studies on the literary history of reception and the catalog of reproductive graphics, Dissertation. Kiel 1974.
- Slave or citizen? French Revolution and New Femininity 1760-1830. Exhibition catalog Historical Museum Frankfurt, Frankfurt 1989.
- with Herbert Uerlings, Karl Hölz (ed.): The subject and the others. Interculturality and gender difference from the 18th century to the present. Berlin / Bielefeld / Munich 2001.
- with Karl Hölz, Herbert Uerlings (ed.): White Eyes. Gender myths of colonialism. Marburg 2005.
- Aesthetics of difference. Postcolonial perspectives from the 16th to the 21st century. 2 vols. Marburg 2010. 2nd ed. 2014.
