= Mar Esquembre =

Spanish jurist and legal scholar

Mar Esquembre Cerdá
- Born: María del Mar Esquembre Cerdá
- Education: University of Alicante
- Occupations: Jurist, legal scholar, columnist
- Employer: University of Alicante
- Known for: Work on constitutional law and feminist theory

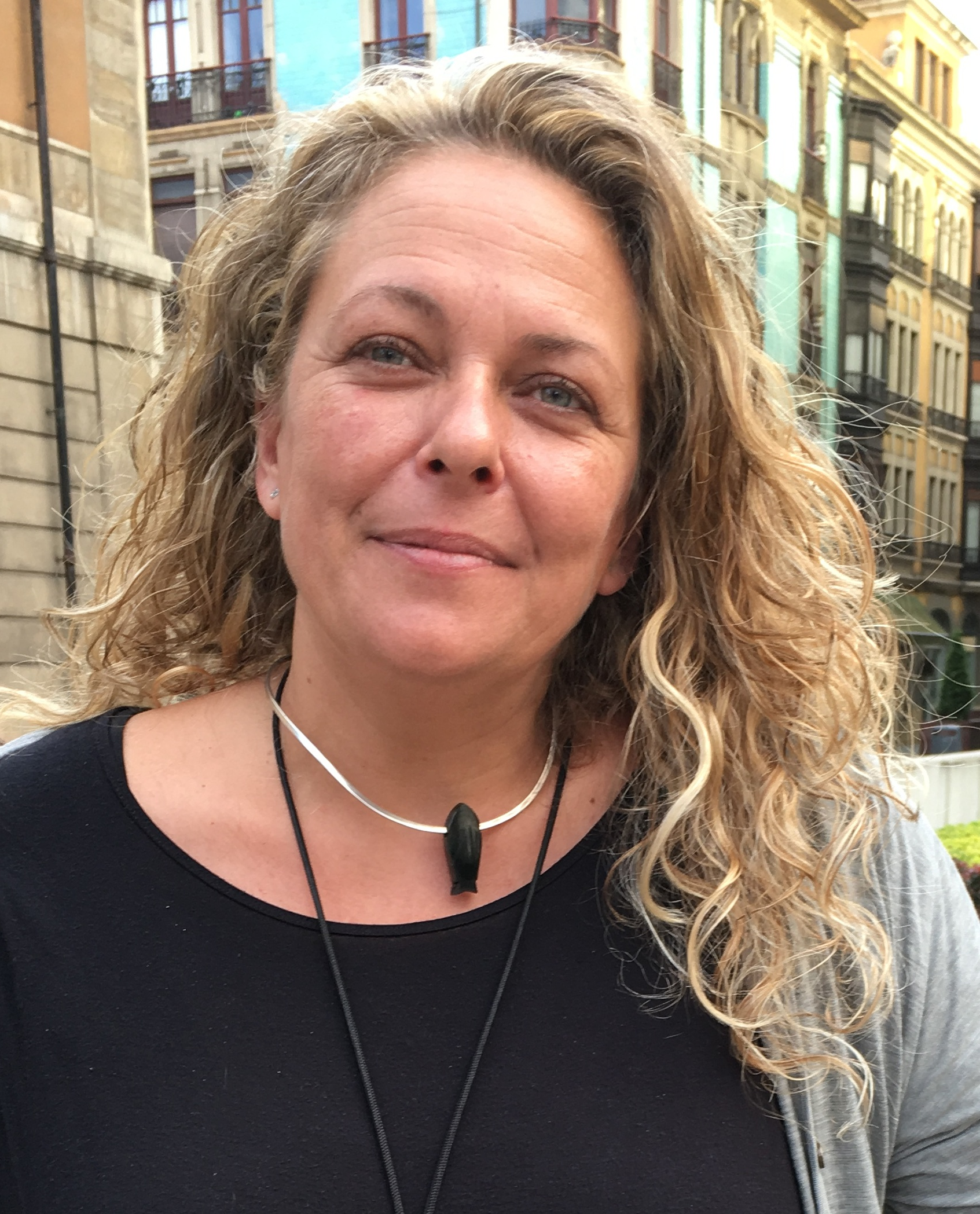

Mar Esquembre Cerdá (María del Mar Esquembre Cerdá) is a Spanish jurist and legal scholar specializing in constitutional law and feminist theory. She is a professor of constitutional law at the University of Alicante, a co-founder of the Red Feminista de Derecho Constitucional, and served as president of that association from 2018 to 2021. She also directs the University Seminar on Women's Rights in the Constitutional Law Area at the University of Alicante and writes a weekly opinion column in Información on law and equality.

== Career ==
Esquembre received a law degree from the University of Alicante in 1994 and completed doctoral studies in Transformaciones políticas y cambio constitucional ("Political Transformations and Constitutional Change") in 1998.

She is a tenured professor of constitutional law in the Department of State Legal Studies at the University of Alicante. Her institutional biographies describe her research as focused on constitutional law and its relationship to gender studies, citizenship, immigration, constitutional theory, and state theory,; they also highlight her proposals for incorporating feminist theory into the research and teaching methodology of constitutional law, as well as her participation in legal reports on equality policies and their application in reforms within Spain's autonomous communities.

She helped found the Red Feminista de Derecho Constitucional in 2004. According to the association, the network arose from concern over the absence of gender perspectives in the social and legal sciences, and especially in constitutional law; it was created to promote equality in university life and to reform legal knowledge by incorporating feminist theory into research and teaching. Esquembre later served as the network's secretary (2004–2011), board member (2011–2018), and president (2018–2021).

She has also served as deputy director and director of the Centre for Women's Studies (CEM) at the University of Alicante, later incorporated into the university's gender-studies institute.

In 2015, Esquembre was among the constitutional scholars, philosophers, academics, and feminist public figures who launched the anti-surrogacy campaign #NoSomosVasijas ("#WeAreNotVessels"), framing it as a human rights intervention in the public debate over surrogacy. Press coverage of the campaign named signatories including Amelia Valcárcel, Victoria Camps, Alicia Miyares, and Ana de Miguel.

== Complaint over security search at the Congress of Deputies ==
In October 2013, Esquembre was subjected to a search after being invited by the Socialist Parliamentary Group to attend a plenary sitting from the guest gallery of the Congress of Deputies. She was taken to an adjoining room and required to remove her clothing until she was left in her underwear in an experience she described as "humiliating". The incident came a week after three FEMEN activists had staged a protest in the chamber. The Socialist group lodged a formal complaint over what it described as improper treatment of its guest.

The police commissioner of the lower house denied that she had been subjected to a strip search. Following the incident, the Bureau of the Congress agreed to have chamber police conduct prior checks on invited visitors and to apply heightened precautions in cases involving prior protest activity.

== Awards and honours ==
- 2010 – Angelita Rodríguez Award, presented by the provincial equality secretariat of the PSPV-PSOE.
- 2015 – Award of the Federation of Progressive Women of Valencia, for her public commitment to equality policies and women's rights.
- 2017 – 8 March Award of the Xarxa de Dones de la Marina Alta.
- 2017 – Comadre de Oro, awarded by Tertulia Feminista Les Comadres for her commitment and contributions to feminist constitutional scholarship.

== Selected publications ==
Some of her notable works include:

- Las mujeres ante el cambio constitucional. Algunos apuntes desde una perspectiva feminista para una “reforma constituyente” de la Constitución Española (2016), Atlánticas. Revista Internacional de Estudios Feministas, 1 (1), pp. 184–212.
- With Emelina Galarza and Rosa Cobo, Medios y violencia simbólica contra las mujeres (2016), Revista Latina de Comunicación Social, special no. 71, pp. 818–832.
- Feminismo y constitucionalismo crítico, in Constitucionalismo crítico: Liber amicorum Carlos de Cabo Martín (2015), coordinated by Miguel Ángel García Herrera, José Asensi Sabater and Francisco Balaguer Callejón, pp. 369–379. ISBN 978-84-9086-550-7.
- With María Concepción Torres Díaz, Nilda Garay Montañez and María Nieves Montesinos Sánchez, La perspectiva de género como innovación docente en la asignatura "Justicia constitucional e interpretación constitucional" (2015), pp. 741–754. ISBN 978-84-606-8636-1.
- Derecho constitucional y género. Una propuesta epistémica metodológica, in Igualdad y democracia: el género como categoría de análisis jurídico. Estudios en homenaje a la profesora Julia Sevilla Merino (2014), Valencia: Cortes Valencianas, pp. 229–239.
- Ciudadanía y género. Una reconstrucción de la tríada de derechos fundamentales, in Cristina Monereo Atienza and J. Luis Monereo López (eds.), Género y derechos fundamentales (2010), Granada: Comares.
