= Nuno Gomes (disambiguation) =

Nuno Gomes (born 1976) is a Portuguese former football striker.

It may also refer to:

- Nuno Gomes (footballer, born 1978), Portuguese football defender
- Nuno Gomes (footballer, born 1979), Portuguese football defender
- Nuno Gomes (footballer, born 1980), Portuguese football forward
- Nuno Gomes (diver), South African diver

== See also ==
- Nuño Gómez, Spanish municipality
- Laura Nuño Gómez (born 1967), Spanish academic
