= Rosa Cobo Bedía =

Spanish feminist, writer and professor

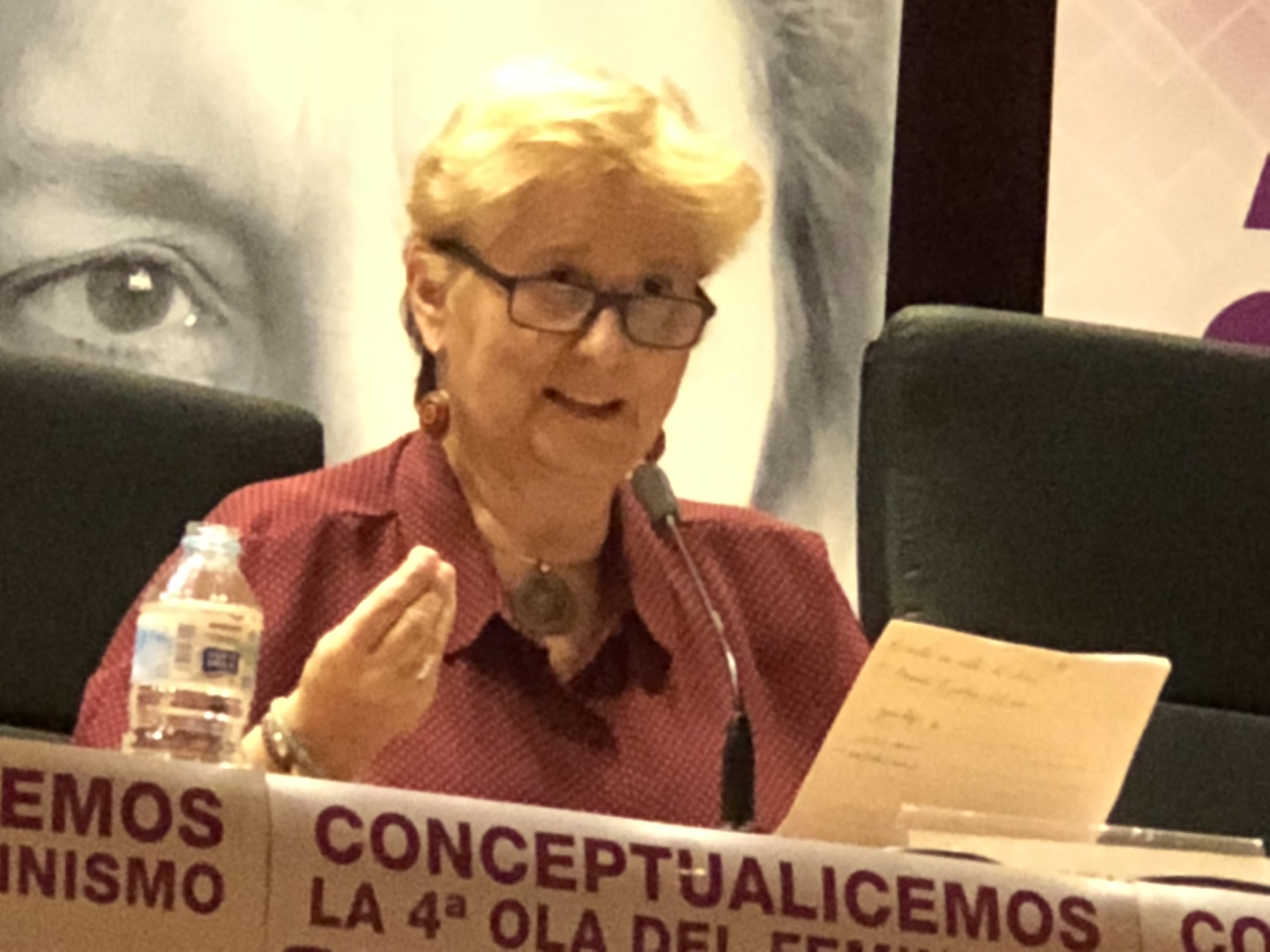
Rosa Cobo Bedía in 2018

Rosa Cobo Bedía (born 17 December 1956) is a Spanish feminist, writer, and professor of sociology of gender at the University of A Coruña. She is also the director of the Center for Gender Studies and Feminists at the same university. Her main line of research is feminist theory and the sociology of gender. In 2019, the University of Las Palmas de Gran Canaria referred to Cobo as "one of Spain's most renowned feminist theorists".

== Early life and education ==
Rosa Cobo Bedía was born in Cantabria on 17 December 1956. She graduated with a bachelor's degree in Political Sciences and Sociology in 1981 from the Complutense University of Madrid. She obtained her master's degree in 1983 with the thesis, El principio de Renaturalización en Jean Jacques Rousseau ("The principle of Renaturalization in Jean Jacques Rousseau"). In 1992, she read her doctoral dissertation on Democracia y Patriarcado en Jean Jacques Rousseau ("Democracy and Patriarchate in Jean Jacques Rousseau"), directed by Dr. Celia Amorós and graduated cum laude with honours from University of A Coruña.

== Career and research ==
"The female body and the sexual overload surrounding it indicate that the context in which this hypersexualization occurs is an unfettered free market; this market views women's bodies as a commodity from which surplus value is extracted—value essential for the social reproduction of patriarchy and neoliberal capitalism." (Rosa Cobo Bedia)

Cobo was the founder and first director of the Interdisciplinary Seminar on Feminist Studies of the University of A Coruña between 2000 and 2003. She also directed the Master's program on Gender and Equality Policies from 2005 to 2008. Her main line of research is feminist theory and the sociology of gender. She has been a member of the Advisory Team of the Women and Science Unit (UMYC) of the Ministry of Education in the General Secretariat of Scientific and Technological Policy. In 2008, she was an advisor to the Ministry of Equality. She has taught courses and conferences on gender sociology and feminist theory in Spain and in different countries of Latin America. She directed a project on Prostitution and Public Policies funded by the Institute for Women. She directs the course on the History of Feminist Theory at the University of A Coruña, and holds a master's degree in Equality and Equity in the Development of Cooperation at the University of Vic - Central University of Catalonia.

According to Graciela Atencio in a 2024 interview, Cobo "holds a prominent place in Spanish feminist thought and balances essay writing with academic research, teaching, and lecturing across various fields."

== Awards and honours ==
- 2026, Award for Professional and Academic Career Achievement at the Cantabria Political Science and Sociology Awards, presented by the Professional Association of Political Science and Sociology of Cantabria.
- 2023, Isabel Oyarzabal Award, Association for the Defense of Women's Public Image (ADIPM)
- 2021, Seneca Falls Award, Xirivella City Council
- 2020, 8 de Març Prize by the Xarxa de Dones de la Marina Alta
- 2020, prize, Government Delegation against Gender-Based Violence (Ministry of Equality)
- 2019, Recognition for Commitment to Equality in Rural Areas, awarded by the Provincial Council of A Coruña
- 2018, Comadre de Oro award from the Tertulia Feminista les Comadres
- 2017, Igualdade Prize "Ernestina Otero", Vigo Municipal Women's Council
- 2017, Club de las 25 Award
- 1997, winner, feminist prize, "Carmen de Burgos", for the best published article of that year, granted by the Association of Historical Studies on Women at the University of Malaga

== Selected works ==
=== Books ===
- 2024: La ficción del consentimiento sexual ISBN 978-8410670389
- 2020: Pornografía. El placer del poder ISBN 978-8466667906
- 2020: Breve diccionario de feminismo (Mayor nº 782) (with Beatriz Ranea Triviño ) ISBN 978-8490979631
- 2019: La imaginación feminista: Debates y transformaciones disciplinares ISBN 978-8490977262
- 2017: La prostitución en el corazón del capitalismo] ISBN 978-8410671102
- 2011, 2026: Hacia una nueva política sexual: Las mujeres ante la reacción patriarcal ISBN 978-8410675056
- 2008: Educar en la ciudadanía. Perspectivas feministas (Ed.) ISBN 978-8483193464
- 2007: Interculturalidad, feminismo y educación ISBN 978-8483193228
- 1995: Fundamentos del patriarcado moderno. Jean Jacques Rousseau ISBN 978-8437613253
- 1991: Las mujeres españolas: lo privado y lo público (with Pepa Cruz Cantero) ISBN 978-8474761566
- 1990: Situación social de los viejos en España (with Pepa Cruz Cantero) ISBN 978-8474761368

=== Coauthor ===
- 2014: “¿Prácticas culturales o prácticas patriarcales?”, with Edurne Chocarro de Luis & María del Carmen Sáenz Berceo (eds.) Oriente y occidente: la construcción de la subjetividad femenina, Universidad de La Rioja.
- 2013: “Las políticas de género y el género en la política”, with Capitolina Díaz Martínez & Sandra Dema Moreno (Coord.) Sociología y género, editorial Tecnos
- 2010: “Elogio del feminismo (y crítica de los patriarcados contemporáneos)”, with Marián López Fdez. Cao & Luisa Posada Kubissa (Eds.), Pensar con Celia Amorós, ed. Fundamentos, Madrid, Págs. 45–54.
- 2009: “Debates teóricos sobre democracia paritaria”, with Gloria Angeles, Franco Rubio and Ana Iriarte Goñi, Nuevas rutas para Clío: el impacto de las teóricas francesas en la historiografía feminista española, Icaria
- 2009: “El género en las ciencias sociales”, with Patricia Laurenzo, María Luisa Maqueda and Ana Rubio, Género, violencia y derecho, Ediciones del Puerto, Buenos Aires (Argentina).
- 2008: “La democracia moderna y la exclusión de las mujeres”, with Fernanda Henriques (coord.), Género, diversidade e cidadanía, Ediçoes Colibrí/NEHM/CIDEHUS-UE, Lisboa.
- 2007: “Multiculturalismo y nuevas formas de violencia patriarcal”, with Celia Amorós & Luisa Posada Kubissa, Feminismo y multiculturalismo, Ed. Instituto de la Mujer, Colección Debate, Madrid. Pág. 71–84.
- 2006: “Izquierda y feminismo: ni juntos ni separados”, with Esperanza Bosch Fiol, Victoria Aurora Ferrer Pérez & Capilla Navarro Guzmán, Los feminismos como herramientas de cambio social, Universidad de las Islas Baleares
- 2005: “Género, feminismo y teoría política”, with Eric Herrán, Filosofía Política Contemporánea, UNAM (Universidad Nacional Autónoma de México), México.
- 2003: “Democracia paritaria y radicalización de la igualdad”, with VV.AA. Seminario “Balance y perspectivas de los estudios de las mujeres y del género”, Ed. Instituto de la Mujer (Ministerio de Trabajo y Asuntos Sociales), Madrid.
- 2001: "Algunas reflexiones sobre la identidad política del movimiento feminista", with Amelia Valcárcel & Rosalía Romero, Pensadoras del Siglo XX, colección Hypatia 2, Instituto Andaluz de la Mujer, Sevilla.
- 1998: “Diversidad cultural y multiculturalismo”, in Amnistía Internacional, La mutilación genital femenina y los derechos humanos, Madrid, Edai.
- 1997: “Las implicaciones políticas del feminismo” (coautora), in Filosofía política I. Ideas políticas y movimientos sociales, (edición de Fernando Quesada) Trotta/CSIC.
- 1995: “Género”, with Celia Amorós, Diez palabras clave sobre mujer, Editorial Verbo Divino, Navarra.
- 1994: “La construcción social de lo femenino en Mary Wollstonecraft”, in Historia de la Teoría Feminista. Instituto de Investigaciones Feministas, Universidad Complutense de Madrid/Comunidad Autónoma de Madrid.

=== Articles ===
- 2015: “La izquierda y el feminismo", eldiario.es, 03/02/2015.
- 2014: “¿Qué hacer con la prostitución?, eldiario.es, 11/10/2014.
- 2012: “Las paradojas de la igualdad en Jean Jacques Rousseau”, Avances del Cesor, Universidad de Rosario/CONICET, Rosario, Año IX, nº 9 (Argentina)
- 2011: “¿Educación para la libertad?”, Revista interuniversitaria de formación del profesorado, nº 71.
- 2009: “Antinatura”, Festa da palabra silenciada, nº 25.
- 2008: “Patriarcado y feminismo: del dominio a la rebelión”, El valor de la Palabra. Revista anual de pensamiento. Hacia la ciudadanía del siglo XXI, nº 6. Ed. Fundación Fernando Buesa Blanco, Vitoria/Gasteiz.
- 2007: “Discusións en torno ao concepto de patriarcado”, Festa da palabra silenciada, nº 23.
- 2006: “La ética de los cuidados y los tiempos de las mujeres”, Crítica (Madrid), nº 933, March.
- 2005: “El género en las ciencias sociales”, Cuadernos de Trabajo Social.
- 2004: “Sexo, democracia y poder político”, Feminismos (Alicante), nº 3 June.
- 2002: “Democracia paritaria y sujeto político feminista”, Anales de la cátedra Francisco Suárez (Granada), nº 36.
- 2001: “Feminismo y democracia paritaria”, El Viejo Topo, (Barcelona), November.
- 2000: “Género y teoría social”, RIS. Revista Internacional de Sociología.
- 1998: “Las mujeres en Europa: entre la igualdad y la exclusión”, Crítica (Madrid), nº 855.
- 1997: “Mujeres y ciudadanas”, El viejo topo (Barcelona), November.
- 1996: “Sociedad, democracia y patriarcado en Jean Jacques Rousseau”, Papers. Revista de Sociología (Barcelona), nº 50.
- 1995: “La democracia moderna y la exclusión de las mujeres”, Mientras Tanto (Barcelona).
- 1993: “Análisis de género y educación: raíces de una desigualdad”, Cuadernos de Cooperación Educativa (Sevilla), nº 3.
- 1990: “Mary Wollstonecraft: un caso de feminismo ilustrado”, REIS. Revista de Investigaciones Sociológicas, CIS, (Madrid), nº 48.
- 1986: “El problema de la renaturalización en Jean Jacques Rousseau”, REP. Revista de Estudios Políticos, (Madrid), nº 50.
