= Verónica Bolón-Canedo =

Spanish computer scientist

Verónica Bolón-Canedo (born 1984) is a Spanish computer scientist whose research concerns feature selection in machine learning, with applications including medical diagnosis, oil spill detection, and automated educational assessment. She is a professor at the University of A Coruña.

== Education and career ==
Bolón-Canedo was born in Carballo in 1984. She studied computer science at the nearby University of A Coruña, earning a bachelor's degree in 2009, a master's degree in 2010, and completing her Ph.D. in 2014.

After postdoctoral research at the University of Manchester in the UK, she returned to the University of A Coruña as an assistant professor. She later became a full professor there, in the Department of Computer Science and Information Technologies.

== Books ==
Bolón-Canedo is the author or editor of books including:

- Feature Selection for High-Dimensional Data (with Noelia Sánchez-Maroño and Amparo Alonso Betanzos, Springer, 2015)
- Recent Advances in Ensembles for Feature Selection (with Amparo Alonso Betanzos, Springer, 2018)
- Microarray Bioinformatics (edited with Amparo Alonso Betanzos, Springer, 2019)

== Recognition ==
Bolón-Canedo was elected to the Young Academy of Spain in 2020. She was elected as a corresponding member of the Spanish Royal Academy of Sciences in 2022.
