= Montserrat Boix =

Spanish journalist (born 1960)

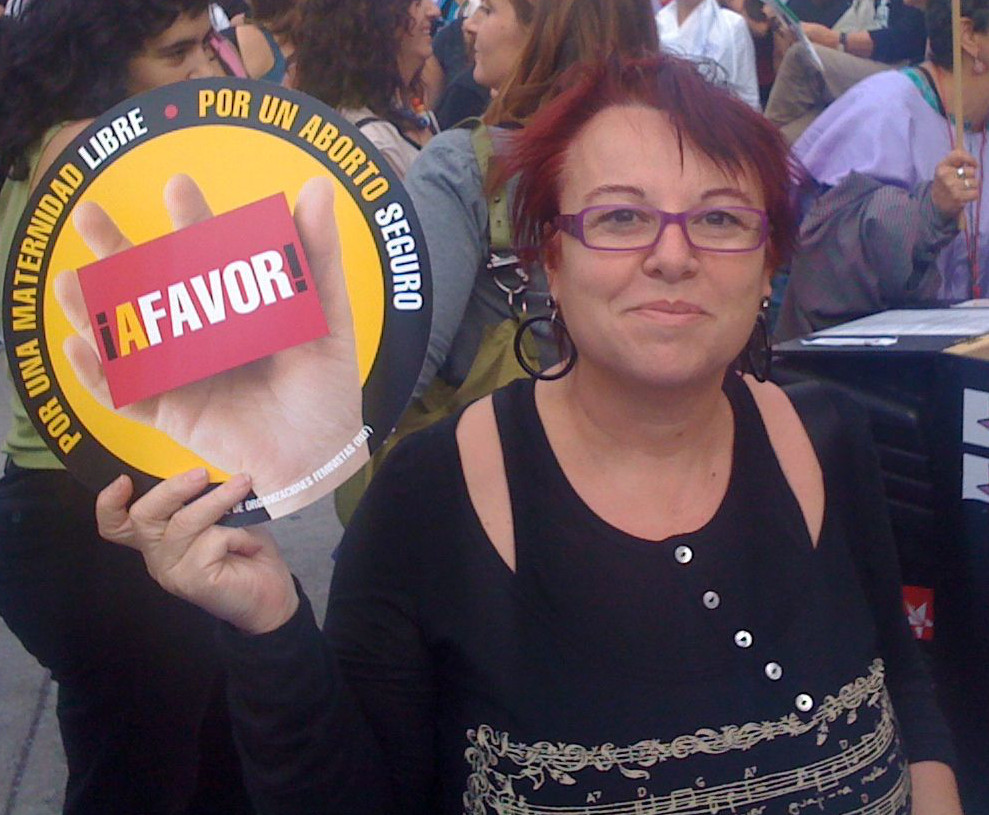
- Born: Montserrat Boix Piqué; 26 January 1960 (age 66); Polinyà, Spain
- Education: Autonomous University of Barcelona
- Occupation: Journalist
- Employer: Televisión Española
- Website: www.mujeresenred.net

Montserrat Boix Piqué (born 26 January 1960) is a Spanish journalist, considered among the most influential women in her country. In early 2000, she created and developed the concepts of social cyberfeminism, and a year later those of feminist hacktivism. Another of her main areas of work is gender violence and communication. She has also stood out as a defender of the right to communication and citizenship rights for women. Since 1986, she has been a journalist for the Information Services of Televisión Española (TVE), in the international section.

== Biography and career ==
Montserrat Boix holds a licentiate in Information Sciences from the Autonomous University of Barcelona.

In the early 1980s she began her professional career at Radio Miramar in Barcelona. She later moved to Madrid to join the program Encarna de noche, directed by Encarna Sánchez on COPE Madrid. In 1983 she worked on the production of TV3's year-end special directed by Abili Roma. In 1986 she joined TVE's information services, specializing in foreign policy issues and the Arab world, Maghreb, Sahel, and Islamic movements, and jihadist terrorism. She was a special correspondent in Algeria in the early 1990s, covering information about massacres by the GIA and the country's civil war, in Sahrawi refugee camps, Morocco, Egypt, Afghanistan, Guatemala, and Bangladesh.

In addition to the practice of journalism, she is a professor in Master's programs on equality, technology, communication, and development with a gender perspective at various universities, including the International University of Andalucía and the University of the Basque Country. She researches, in turn, how technologies serve as a tool for a new, more immediate, global, and democratized journalism. She works transversally on gender perspective and has received several awards for her work on more egalitarian journalism, among them the Recognition Award for most outstanding journalistic work in the eradication of gender violence granted by the General Council of the Judiciary's Observatory Against Domestic and Gender Violence (2005), the Nicolás Salmerón Human Rights Award for her effort and perseverance in making Mujeres en Red one of the media of reference in the defense of women's rights (2009), and the Non-Sexist Communication Award from the Association of Women Journalists of Catalonia (2015).

== Social cyberfeminism ==
In 2002, Boix published "Los géneros de la red: los ciberfeminismos" with feminist philosopher Ana de Miguel in the book The role of humanity in the information age. A Latin Perspective, published by the University of Chile. This was the first work to articulate the concept of "social cyberfeminism".

Montserrat Boix distinguishes between radical cyberfeminism, conservative cyberfeminism, and what she herself calls social cyberfeminism, which as indicated "is associated with organizations, networks, and social movements that have incorporated ICT as communication channels with a tradition of thought and action prior to the emergence of networks on the Internet where traditionally marginalized groups demand new political spaces."

— Cecilia Castaño

In November 2006, in the publication Labrys no. 10, she poses the concept of feminist hacktivism in the essay "Hackeando el patriarcado: La lucha contra la violencia hacia las mujeres como nexo. Filosofía y práctica de Mujeres en Red desde el ciberfeminismo socia" (Hacking the Patriarchy: The Struggle Against Violence Against Women as a Nexus. Philosophy and Practice of Women on the Net from Social Cyberfeminism).

== Mujeres en Red ==
In 1996, Montserrat Boix created Mujeres en Red, a feminist periodical.

== Awards and recognitions ==
- 2000: AMECO Communication Award
- 2001: Rosa Manzano Award, given by the PSOE's Secretary of Equality
- 2005: Recognition Award for journalistic work distinguished by the eradication of gender violence, given by the General Council of the Judiciary's Observatory Against Domestic Violence
- 2009: Nicolás Salmerón Human Rights Award for her effort and perseverance in making Mujeres en Red one of the media of reference in the defense of women's rights
- 2011: 7th Isonomía Award against gender violence, Isonomía Foundation/Jaume I University
- 2015: Non-Sexist Communication Award, Association of Women Journalists of Catalonia
- 2016: Chosen by Mujer Hoy magazine as one of "Spain's 100 Most Influential Women"
- 2016, 2017: Included on the newspaper El Mundo's list of Spain's 500 most influential women
- 2017: 10th Creating Spaces of Equality Award in the Communication category, given by the Women's Council of the Municipality of Madrid

== Publications ==
- "Manual sobre el uso del ordenador y la Internet. Historia sobre las redes internacionales de mujeres en la Internet" in El viaje de las internautas. Una perspectiva de género en las nuevas tecnologías (2001). Spanish Association of Women Communicators (AMECO)
- Sociedad Civil y redes de mujeres en las nuevas tecnologías de la comunicación (2002)
- "Cuando la violencia doméstica cruza el umbral del espacio público" in Violencia y Género Volume II. (2003) María Teresa López Beltrán, María José Jiménez Tomé, Eva María Gil Benitez (Eds). Asociación de Estudios Históricos sobre la Mujer. Centro de ediciones de la diputación de Málaga. ISBN 9788477855293.
- "Los géneros de la red: los ciberfeminismos" in the book The role of humanity in the information age. A Latin Perspective by Ana de Miguel and Montserrat Boix.
- "Las TIC, un nuevo espacio de intervención en la defensa de los derechos sociales. Las mujeres okupan la red" in the book Género, sexo, medios de comunicación. Realidades, estrategias, utopías coordinated by Natividad Abril. University of the Basque Country. ISBN 8487595952.
- Comparecencia en el Senado en la Ponencia sobre la erradicación de la violencia doméstica. Joint Commission for Women's Rights. 2 April 2001. Conclusions of the Presentation.
- Hacktivismo Feminista (Versión Beta-1) (2003). Suburbia.
- Hacklabs de lo digital a lo analógico (2003). Montserrat Boix and Nómada. Mentes Inquietas and Suburbia.
- Una informática con lenguaje no sexista (2004)
- ¿Y tu, navegas? (February 2006)
- Ciberfeminismo social como experiencia (2006)
- Nuevas tecnologías de la Información y la comunicación: creando puentes entre las mujeres (2006)
- "Hackear el patriarcado: La lucha contra la violencia hacia las mujeres como nexo. Filosofía y práctica de Mujeres en Red desde el ciberfeminismo social". Revista Labrys (2006). Monograph about feminism in Spain coordinated by Ana de Miguel.
- Sociedad de la Información y feminismo. Feminismo: herramienta imprescindible para la construcción de la sociedad del conocimiento. Software Libre y Feminismo (2007)
- "Nuevas tecnologías de la información y la comunicación: creando puentes entre las mujeres" in the book Nosotras en el país de las comunicaciones (2007). Silvia Chocarro (coord.). Editorial Icaria
- "Comunicación: todavía una asignatura pendiente para el feminismo" in the book Los feminismos como herramientas de cambio social (II): De la violencia contra las mujeres a la construcción del pensamiento feminista (2006). Compiled by Victoria A. Ferrer Pérez and Esperanza Bosch Fiol. Treballs Feministas No. 6. University of the Balearic Islands. ISBN 8476329598.
- "Comunicación y educación para la ciudadanía" in Revista Andalucía Educativa No. 62 (August 2007)
- Mujeres en Red, la información es poder. En Dones contra l’Estat (2008). Juncal Caballero and Sonia Reverter eds. Seminari d'Investigació Feminista. UJC. ISBN 9788460808084
- Una docena de argumentos para animarte a hacer un blog (2012)
- Una mirada a la comunicación desde la perspectiva de género y el activismo feminista (2013)
- "Prácticas e imágenes deformadas en el discurso mediático" in Informar con perspectiva de género en Medios de Comunicación e Igualdad una alianza necesaria (2014). Audiovisual Council of Andalusia.
