= Pilar Civeira =

Spanish doctor and professor

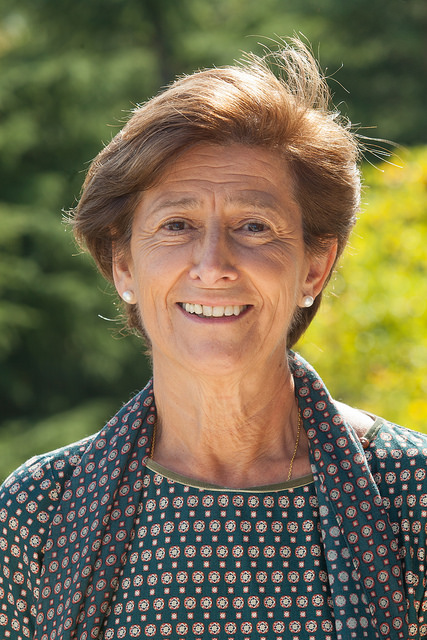
- Born: August 26, 1952 (age 73); Zaragoza
- Known for: leading the Center for Applied Medical Research at the University of Navarra.

Pilar Civeira Murillo (born August 26, 1952) is a Spanish doctor and professor who leads the Center for Applied Medical Research at the University of Navarra.

== Life ==
Civeira was born in 1952 to a family that had strong associations with the local University of Zaragoza. She followed family tradition and studied and became qualified to practice medicine at the University. She studied further and in 1983 she was awarded a doctorate from the University of Navarra. She also received a special award with her Ph.D. After that she went on to specialise at the University of Barcelona.

In 1986 she went on to work in the laboratories of Dr. Robert Gallo at Bethesda, studying new antiviral drugs. Her research interests are hepatology and the use of gene therapy. She is an expert on the pathogenesis of chronic viral hepatitis.

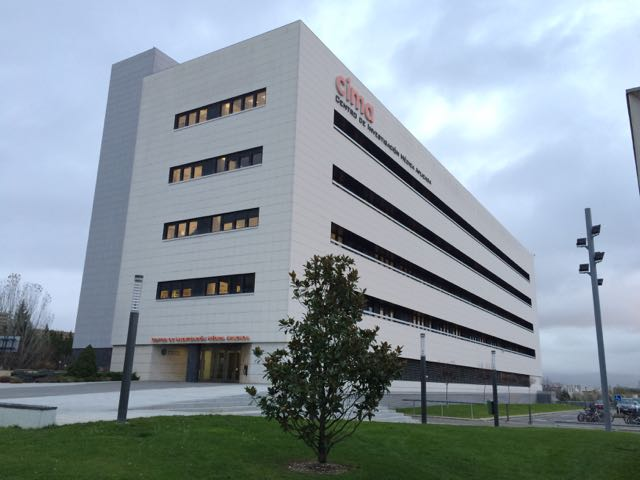
The Center for Applied Medical Research (CIMA)

In 1990 she beat other candidates to become professor at the University of Santiago de Compostela. In 1999 she obtained the chair of Internal Medicine at the University of A Coruña. She returned to the University of Navarra to be their professor of Internal Medicine. In 2001 she became the Dean of the Faculty of Medicine which she held until 2010. In 2016, she became director of the Center for Applied Medical Research (CIMA). She was to direct the centre and its 300 researchers and staff in partnership with scientific director Dr. Jesús San Miguel and manager Javier Mata. She has written 80 scientific papers and taken in part in 15 research projects.

In 2018 her research centre (CIMA) received over 2.85m euros from the "la Caixa" foundation to investigate liver cancer and relates liver problems. The "Hepacare" project was launched against a background of the 325m people worldwide who suffer with Hepatitis B infection and the realisation that liver cancer was second only to lung cancer as a cause of death from cancer,
