= Francisco J. Blanco García =

Spanish medical professional

Francisco Javier Blanco García (1963, Honorary son of Cee, A Coruña) is a Spanish medical professional who has established a career in the field of rheumatology. He holds the position of full professor in the Department of Physiotherapy, Medicine, and Biomedical Sciences at the Universidad de A Coruña. Additionally, he serves as the Head of the Clinical and Translational Rheumatology Section at the A Coruña University Hospital and is the Coordinator of the Rheumatology-Health Research Group (GIR) at INIBIC and CICA-UDC. Francisco J Blanco is also a Corresponding Academic of the Royal National Academy of Medicine of Spain, the Royal National Academy of Pharmacy of Spain, and the Royal Academy of Medicine and Surgery of Galicia. Recently, he was appointed Director of the Cathedra San Rafael Foundation-UDC.

== Research ==
Francisco Javier Blanco García's research is mainly focused on rheumatology, particularly in understanding osteoarthritis. He was the first to identify apoptosis in human joint chondrocytes, linking it to cartilage destruction in osteoarthritis and associating it with nitric oxide synthesis. Blanco's research focused on studying mitochondria's role in osteoarthritis, leading the international study of mitochondrial genetics as biomarkers for the diagnosis, incidence, and prognosis of knee osteoarthritis.

He has contributed significantly to the field of protein biomarkers in osteoarthritis, recognized by OARSI in 2017.

Blanco is a co-founder of the PROCOAC cohort (Prospective Cohort of OsteoArthritis from Coruña) created in 2006.
