= Frente de Liberación de la Mujer =

Spanish feminist organization

Gloria Nielfa explains the spirit of the Women's Liberation Front and the participation of the philosopher Celia Amorós in the movement

The Frente de Liberación de la Mujer (Abbreviation: FLM; lit. 'Women's Liberation Front'), was a Spanish feminist organization founded on 25 January 1976 in Madrid during the transition period after the Francoist era.

== Ideology ==
According to historian Pilar Folguera, professor of Contemporary History at the Autonomous University of Madrid, the organization "attempted to reconcile feminist militancy with a global alternative to fighting for socialism".

The FLM declared itself an "autonomous group made up only of women and independent of the political parties of the Spanish State and of the sectoral organizations" and insisted that the feminist movement should not be content with rejecting the role of the transmission belt of the parties but should go further, although they admitted the possibility of double militancy in a party and the feminist movement.

They demanded that women be recognized as full citizens and highlighted their struggle against capitalism and the class-divided society with the aim of achieving a socialist society with economic equality in order to propose the end of the machista ideology.

Other demands outlined in its founding manifesto are the decriminalization of abortion, free and open access to contraceptives, the elimination of sexist roles in the media and the abolition of discriminatory treatment of women based on their marital status. They also joined in the demand for democratic freedoms in Spain by asking, among other things, for a general amnesty, the repeal of the anti-terrorist decree-law, special jurisdictions and the death penalty.

== Members ==
Founding members included Jimena Alonso.
