= Amparo Alonso Betanzos =

Spanish professor and researcher (born 1961)

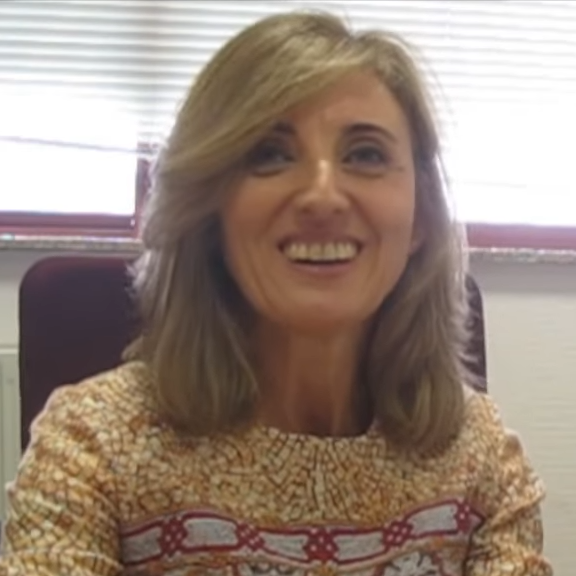
- Alonso-Betanzos in 2014
- Born: October 10, 1961 (age 64); Vigo, Spain
- Education: Universidad de Santiago de Compostela, Spain Medical College of Georgia, United States
- Occupations: Professor, Artificial Intelligence Researcher
- Employer(s): University of A Coruña, Spain
- Awards: L'Oreal-UNESCO Award for Women in Science (Spain)

Amparo Alonso-Betanzos (born October 10, 1961) is a Spanish computer scientist and was president of the Spanish Association for Artificial Intelligence (2013-2021).

== Career ==
She is a professor at University of A Coruña, where she leads the Laboratory for the Investigation and Development of Artificial Intelligence (LIDIA). Originally a chemical engineer, her research now focuses on artificial intelligence, specifically its medical applications.

== Achievements and honours ==
In 1998, she was awarded the L'Oreal-UNESCO Award for Women In Science in Spain.

== Selected research ==
- Bolón-Canedo, Verónica, Noelia Sánchez-Maroño, and Amparo Alonso-Betanzos. "A review of feature selection methods on synthetic data." Knowledge and information systems, 34.3 (2013): 483–519.
- Bolón-Canedo, Verónica, et al. "A review of microarray datasets and applied feature selection methods." Information Sciences, 282 (2014): 111–135.
- Sánchez-Maroño, Noelia, Amparo Alonso-Betanzos, and María Tombilla-Sanromán. "Filter methods for feature selection–a comparative study." International Conference on Intelligent Data Engineering and Automated Learning. Springer, Berlin, Heidelberg, 2007.
- Bolon-Canedo, Veronica, Noelia Sanchez-Marono, and Amparo Alonso-Betanzos. "Feature selection and classification in multiple class datasets: An application to KDD Cup 99 dataset." Expert Systems with Applications, 38.5 (2011): 5947–5957.
