= Ana de Miguel =

Spanish philosopher and feminist

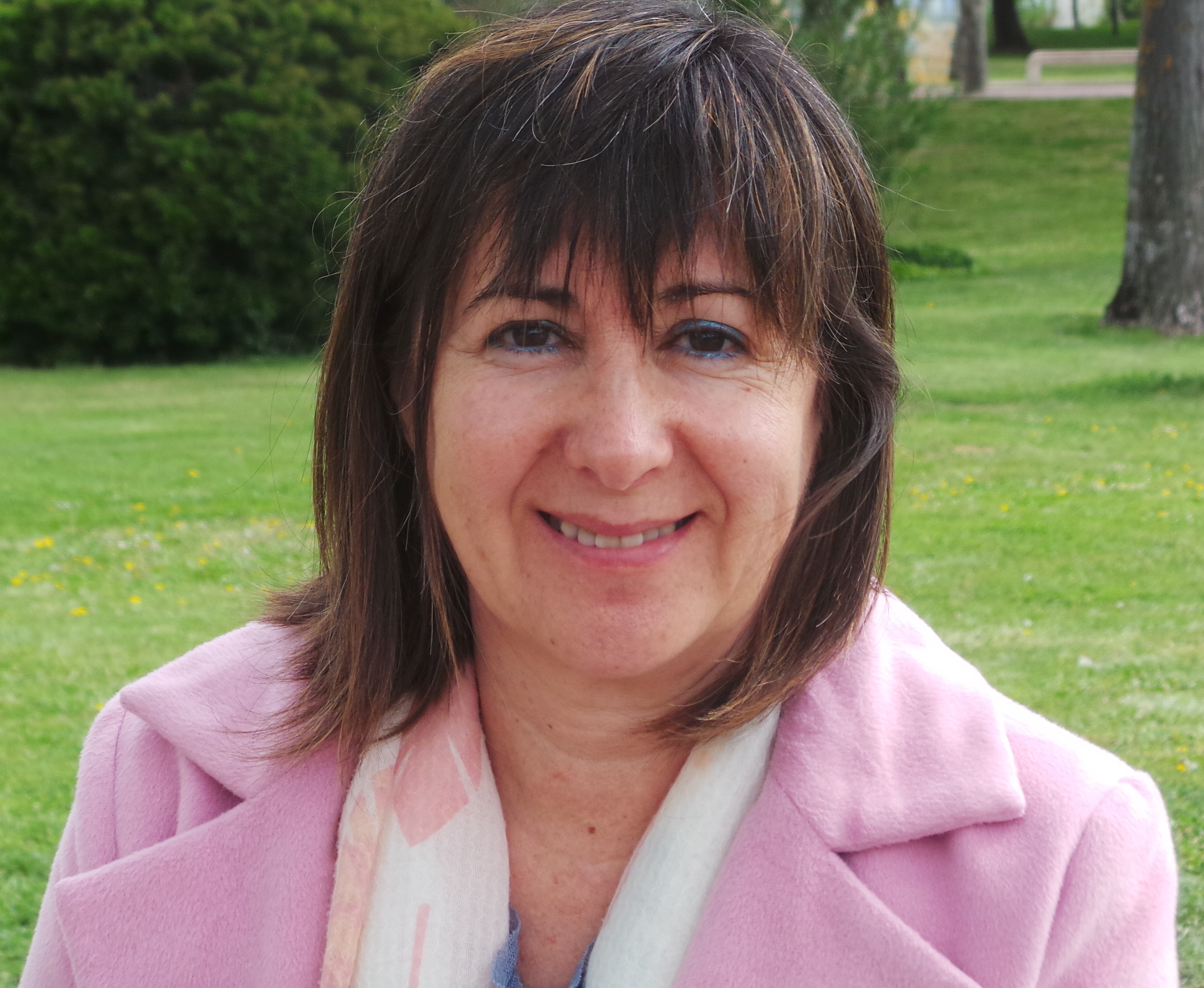
- 2016
- Born: Ana de Miguel Álvarez; 26 October 1961 (age 65); Santander, Spain
- Education: Autonomous University of Madrid
- Occupations: Philosopher, writer
- Employer: King Juan Carlos University

Ana de Miguel Álvarez (born 26 October 1961) is a Spanish philosopher and feminist. Since 2005 she has been a titular professor of Moral and Political Philosophy at King Juan Carlos University of Madrid. She directs the course History of Feminist Theory at the Complutense University of Madrid's Instituto de Investigaciones Feministas.

== Biography ==
Ana de Miguel studied philosophy at the University of Salamanca and received her doctorate at the Autonomous University of Madrid (UAM). In 1984 she completed her thesis Marxismo y feminismo en Alejandra Kollontai.

Her doctoral thesis is entitled Elites y participación política en la obra de John Stuart Mill. She has also done research on the relationships between feminism and Marxism, on Flora Tristan, and on the Egyptian feminist Qasim Amin.

From 1993 to 2005 she worked as a titular professor of Sociology of Gender at the University of A Coruña. In 2005 she joined King Juan Carlos University of Madrid as a titular professor of Moral and Political Philosophy.

== Feminist research ==
El espejismo de la igualdad by Ana de Miguel, November 2015

She was a member of the Seminar on Feminism and Illustration created by philosopher Celia Amorós, taught from 1987 to 1994 at the Complutense University. The Seminar was transformed into the research and development project Feminismo, Ilustración y Postmodernidad (1995–1999). This work was added to the studies conducted around the History of Feminist Theory course, started in 1990/91 at the Complutense University's Instituto de Investigaciones Feministas (in English: Feminist Research Institute) and directed by Ana de Miguel since 2005, and compiled into the three volumes titled Teoría Feminista. De la Ilustración a la globalización.

From 2012 to 2013 she was director of the Master's program in Interdisciplinary Gender Studies at King Juan Carlos University.

One of the basic contributions of her thinking is the reconstruction of a feminist genealogy.

She currently works on feminism as a social movement and its construction of new theoretical frameworks for the interpretation of reality. In this regard, she has distinguished between the politics of redefining reality and the policies of protest. Her latest publications focus on the search for clues to understand how sexual inequality propagates in formally egalitarian societies, especially among young people, on the theoretical framework of gender violence, and on prostitution as a "school of human inequality."

== Sexual neoliberalism ==
In her work Neoliberalismo sexual, de Miguel denounces the neoliberal ideology that aims to turn life, even human beings, into a commodity. She considers that the conversion of women's bodies into merchandise is the most effective means to disseminate and reinforce this ideology, and that the sex industry is connected with it.

In January 2016, she received the First Prize ex aequo from the Social Council of King Juan Carlos University for research excellence in the Arts and Humanities category. In February she was honored with the Comadre de Oro award given annually by the Tertulia Feminista Les Comadres. In May 2016, her work was recognized with the Ángeles Durán Award for Scientific Innovation in the Study of Women and Gender granted by the UAM's University Institute of Women's Studies.

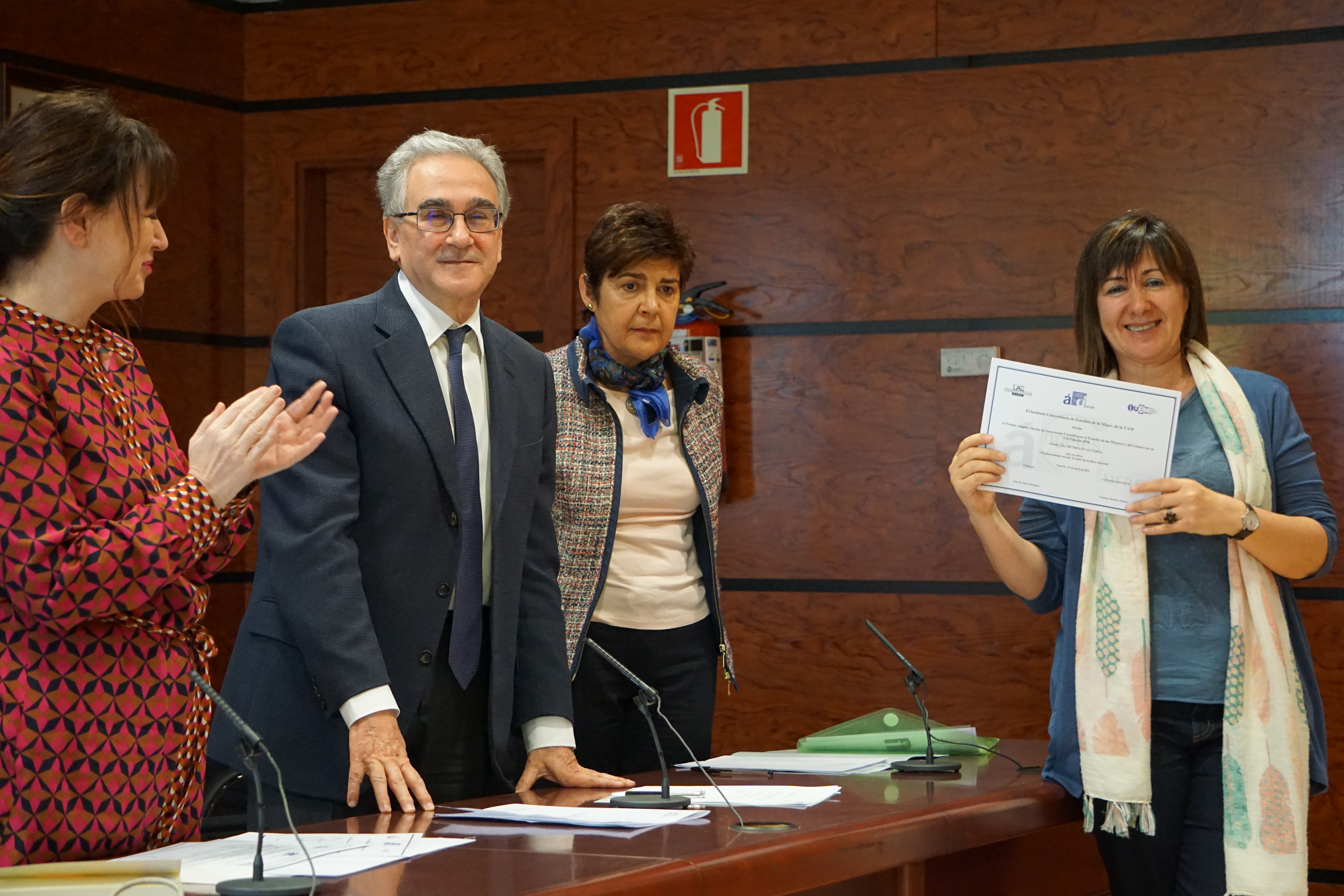
Receiving the 2016 Ángeles Duran Award

== Awards ==
- 2015: First Prize ex aequo from the Social Council of King Juan Carlos University for research excellence in the Arts and Humanities category
- 2016: Comadre de Oro from the Tertulia Feminista Les Comadres
- 2016: Second Prize at the 23rd Carmen de Burgos Feminist Disclosure Award for the article "La prostitución de mujeres, el harén democrático", published in the Huffington Post 20 January 2015
- 2016: Ángeles Durán Award for Scientific Innovation in the Study of Women and Gender (7th edition) from the UAM's University Institute of Women's Studies
- 2017: National Rank of the Progressive Women's Award from the Federation of Progressive Women

== Publications ==
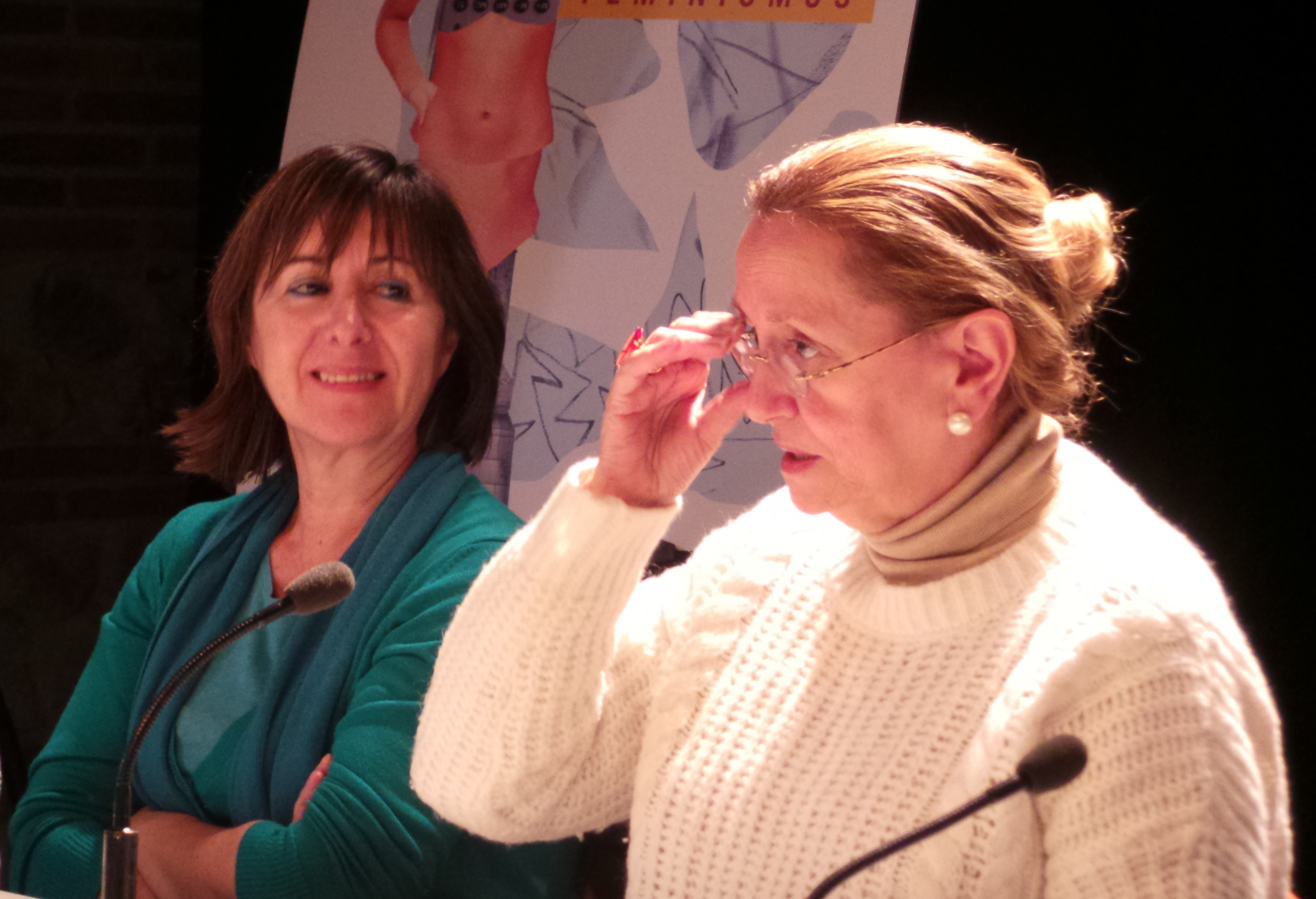
Amelia Valcárcel and Ana de Miguel at the presentation of the book Neoliberalismo sexual. El mito de la libre elección, Madrid, 24 November 2015

=== Books ===
- 1993: Marxismo y feminismo en Alejandra Kollontai, Madrid, Complutense University – Community of Madrid
- 1994: Cómo leer a John Stuart Mill, Madrid, Júcar, ISBN 9788433408167
- 2001: Alejandra Kollontai (1872–1952), Madrid, Ediciones del Orto, ISBN 9788479232634
- 2002: O feminismo ontem e hoje, Lisbon, Ela por Ela, ISBN 972988191X
- 2005: Celia Amorós and Ana de Miguel (eds.), Teoría feminista. De la Ilustración a la globalización (3 vols.), Madrid, Ediciones Minerva, ISBN 9788488123534, 9788488123633, 9788488123558
- 2015: Neoliberalismo sexual. El mito de la libre elección, Madrid, Cátedra, ISBN 9788437634562
- 2017: Nuño Gómez, Laura and de Miguel Álvarez, Ana (dirs.), Fernández Montes, Lidia (coord.), Elementos para una teoría crítica del sistema prostitucional, Granada, Editorial Comares, ISBN 9788490455043

=== Editing, prologues, and translations ===
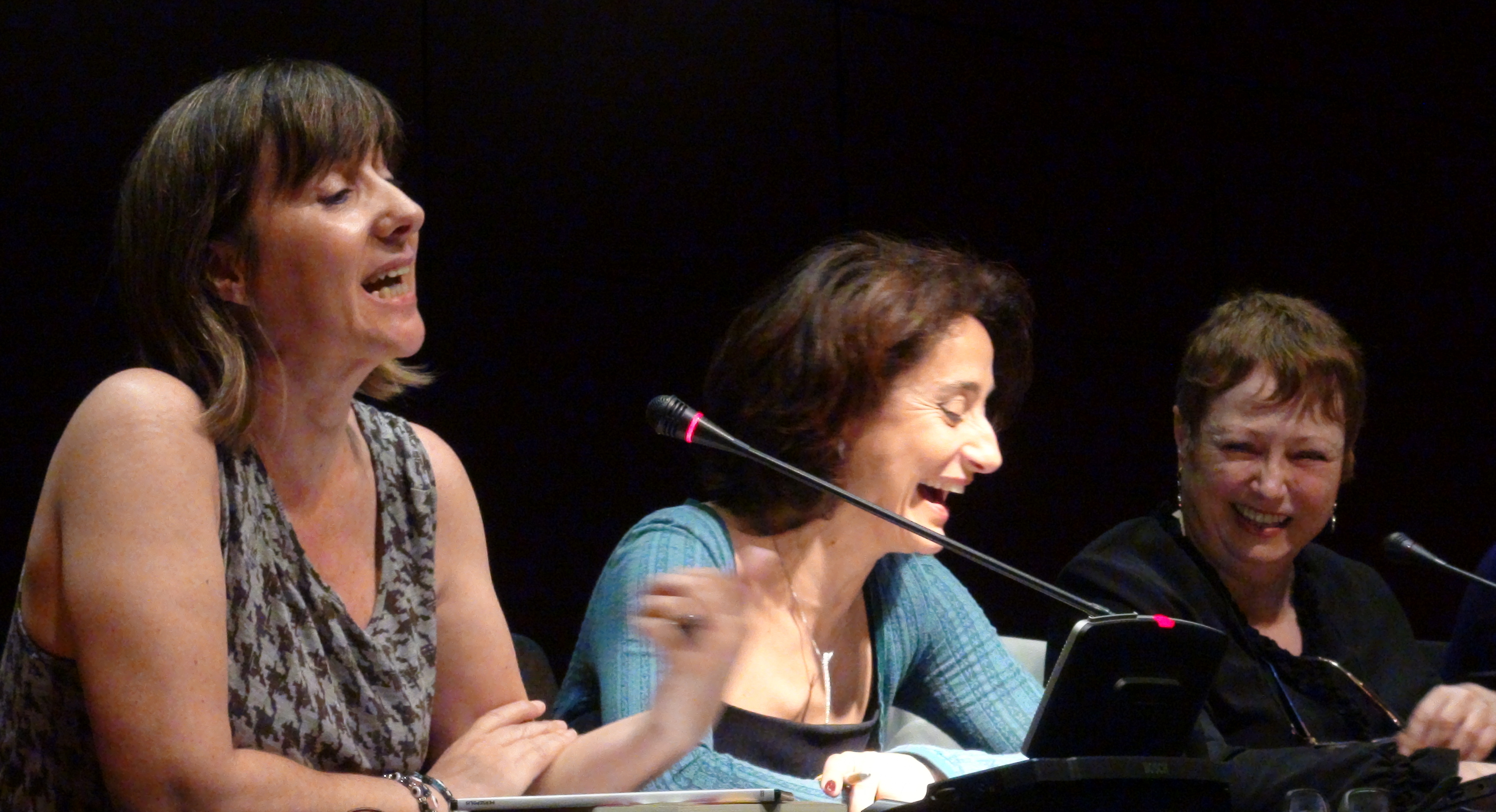
Ana de Miguel, Marian Lopez Fernandez-Cao, and Celia Amorós at the round table of the 20th anniversary of the History of Feminist Theory Course, June 2011

- 2000: Critical editing, introduction, and co-translation of the 1825 work Appeal of One Half of the Human Race, Women by William Thompson and Anna Wheleer as La demanda de la mitad de la raza humana, las mujeres, Granada, Editorial Comares, ISBN 9788484441885
- 2003: Coauthor: introduction and selection of texts for the work Flora Tristán, Feminismo y socialismo, Anthology, Madrid, Los Libros de la Catarata, ISBN 9788483191590
- 2005: Prologue to the work El sometimiento de las mujeres (The Subjection of Women) by John Stuart Mill, Madrid, EDAF, ISBN 9788441422643
- 2006: Labrys no. 10, Dossier España, "Études féministes/estudos feministas", University of Brasília
- 2006: Coordination and introduction of the monograph "Perspectivas feministas en la España del siglo XXI"
- 2010: Prologue to the work El mito del varón sustentador, by Laura Nuño, Barcelona, Icaria, ISBN 9788498881400
- 2011: Introduction to the John Stuart Mill work El voto y la prostitución, Castilla La Mancha, Almud, ISBN 9788493718411
- 2012: Prologue to the Gladys Rocío Ariza Sosa work De inapelable a intolerable: violencia contra las mujeres en sus relaciones de pareja en Medellín, National University of Colombia, Bogotá, ISBN 9789587611212
- 2013: Prologue to the work La violencia contra las mujeres: el amor como coartada by E. Bosch, V. Ferrer et al., Barcelona Anthropos, ISBN 9788415260585
- 2015: Edition of the Alexandra Kollontai work Autobiografía de una mujer sexualmente emancipada y otros textos sobre el amor (The Autobiography of a Sexually Emancipated Communist Woman), Horas y Horas, Madrid, ISBN 9788496004627
