= Laura Nuño Gómez =

Spanish political scientist, feminist activist

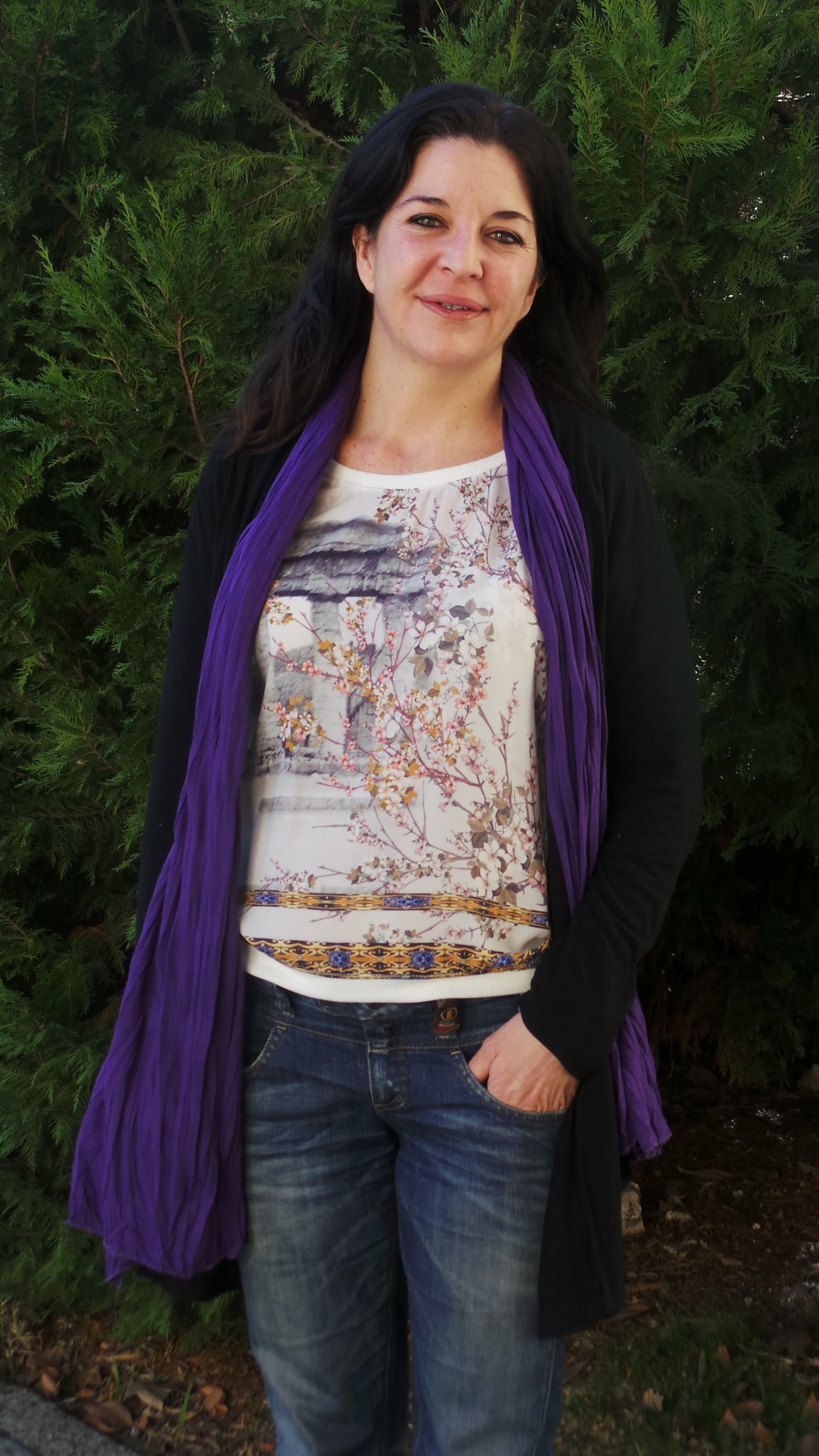
- Born: 27 October 1967 (age 58); Madrid, Spain
- Education: Complutense University of Madrid
- Occupations: Professor, writer
- Employer: King Juan Carlos University
- Notable work: El mito del varón sustentador
- Political party: United Left–Greens

Laura Nuño Gómez (born 27 October 1967) is a Spanish political scientist, researcher, and feminist activist. She is director of the Gender Studies Chair of the Institute of Public Law and the Gender Equality Observatory at King Juan Carlos University (URJC), as well as the creator of the first academic degree in Gender Studies in Spain, and of various postgraduate programs in this subject. She is the author of El mito del varón sustentador (The Myth of the Male Sustainer), as well as about 30 articles and books about her research. Since the enactment of the Law for Effective Equality of Women and Men, she has been one of the three expert members of the State Council for the Participation of Women.

== Research career ==
Laura Nuño holds a PhD in Political Science from the Complutense University of Madrid (UCM). Her doctoral thesis, which she defended in 2008, deals with the origins and consequences of the sexual division of labor. This research, which was subsequently published under the title El mito del varón sustentador, delves into the roots of the sexual division of labor and defends the thesis of how the incorporation of women into public space represents one of the greatest revolutions of the 20th century, although maintaining that it is still incomplete, since new gender roles in the public space have not been accompanied by a reformulation of traditional ones in the private space. This is the reason why the author considers this division one of the main sources of gender inequality.

In addition to this work, Nuño has participated in almost 20 investigations, including "Derecho fundamental a la educación: derechos, ciudadanía y libertad" (Fundamental Right to Education: Rights, Citizenship, and Freedom), "Debates teóricos sobre la prostitución; un análisis de los fundamentos filosóficos, históricos y legales" (Theoretical Debates on Prostitution: An Analysis of the Philosophical, Historical, and Legal Foundations), and "Análisis de la agenda pública en España desde la perspectiva de género: las demandas de las mujeres hacia el sistema político" (Analysis of the Public Agenda in Spain from a Gender Perspective: The Demands of Women Towards the Political System). She is currently part of the research team of the project "El Derecho Constitucional ante la crisis" (Constitutional Law in the Face of the Crisis).

In 2013, along with social researchers Manuel Tamayo Sáenz and Ernesto Carrillo Barroso, she published "La formación de la agenda pública. Análisis comparado de las demandas de hombres y mujeres hacia el sistema político en España" (The Formation of the Public Agenda. Comparative Analysis of the Demands of Men and Women Towards the Political System in Spain). In this work, the public agenda is examined by applying gender perspective as a methodological and analytical tool for the first time.

Nuño worked as an Applied Social Research Technician at the Centro de Investigaciones Sociológicas (CIS) from January 1991 to October 2002, after which she requested a leave of absence to dedicate herself to her teaching and research activities full-time.

== Teaching, institutional, and activist career ==
Nuño began her teaching career at the Complutense University of Madrid in 1991 and is currently a Professor of Political Science at King Juan Carlos University, where she heads the Gender Equality Observatory, the Gender Studies Chair of the Institute of Public Law, the Degree in Gender Equality, and the University Master's Degree in Interdisciplinary Gender Studies, as well as being part of the management team of the program "Género y políticas de igualdad entre mujeres y hombres" (Gender and Politics of Equality Between Women and Men). Under her direction, the Equality Observatory received the Alcorcón City Council Award in 2015 in recognition of its work and commitment to the elimination of violence against women. That year, and through the Observatory on which it depends, she promoted the constitution of the URJC's Equality Unit that formulated the institution's first Equality Plan.

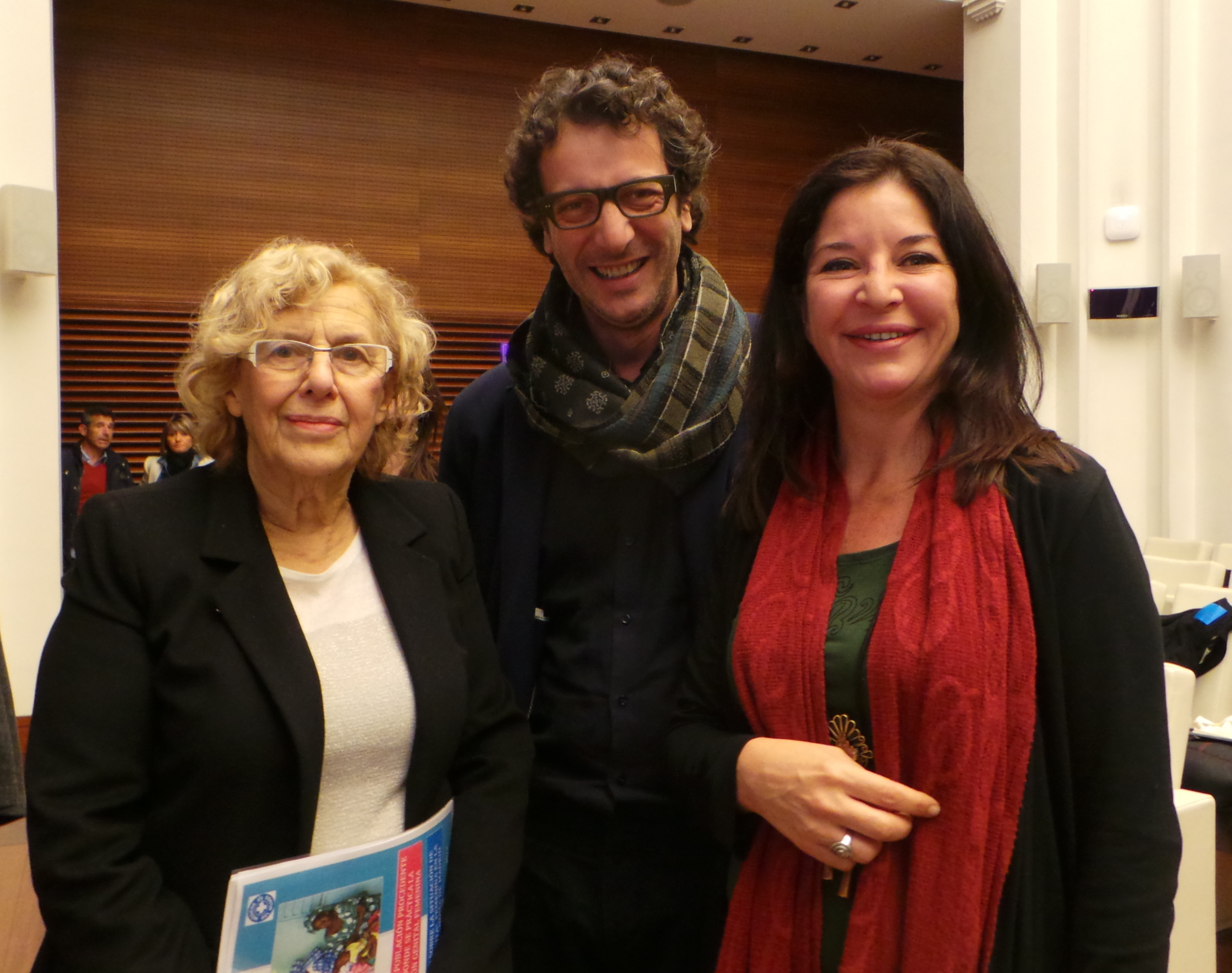
With Manuela Carmena and Felipe Llamas in Madrid at the Multisector Academic Program Conference to Prevent Female Genital Mutilation, 2017

She participates as a teacher in the Degree in Gender Equality, in the official master's degrees of "Interdisciplinary Studies of Equality" (URJC) and "Senior Management" (José Ortega y Gasset Foundation), and in some postgraduate programs such as the Master's Degree in Law and Human Development Perspective of Gender (Supreme Court of Justice of Nicaragua), Master in Management and Leadership (Miguel Escalera Training and Employment Foundation), Master in Sexology and Gender (SexPol Foundation), Master in Gender and Politics of Equality between Women and Men (FOREM), and Master in International Cooperation and Development in Latin America. She is part of the group that promoted and created the University Platform for Feminist and Gender Studies on 30 September 2016, made up of more than 40 university entities, research agencies, and associations.

Since its establishment she has been an expert member of the State Council on Women's Participation. She is also a member of the Advisory Council of the First of May Foundation, the Gender Violence Commission of the City Council of Madrid's Observatory Against Gender Violence, and the Advisory Council of the URJC's Public Law Institute.

Nuño actively participates in various civil society organizations and platforms, such as the Feminist Policy Forum, the Platform for Equal and Untransferable Birth and Adoption Permits (PPIINA), the CSIC Gender Studies Network (GENET), and the CCOO union. She has also been a councilor in San Agustín del Guadalix, as well as a Senate candidate for the United Left–Greens.

== Selected publications ==
=== Monographs ===
- Mujeres de lo privado a lo público (ed.; 1999), Tecnos, ISBN 9788430932863
- Nuño, L., Brunel, S., and Antón, E., Formación contra la violencia de género (2008), Miguel Escalera Training and Employment Foundation, ISBN 9788493645816
- Santiago, P., Nuño, L., Franco, P., Formación en Igualdad de Oportunidades (2008), Miguel Escalera Training and Employment Foundation
- Álvarez Conde, E., Figueruelo, A., and Nuño, L., Estudios Interdisciplinares sobre Igualdad (2009), Iustel, ISBN 9788498901580
- El mito del varón sustentador: Orígenes y consecuencias de la división sexual del trabajo (2010), Gender and Society Collection, Icaria, ISBN 9788498881400
- Género, ciudadanía e Igualdad (2010), Aldevara, ISBN 9788492805426
- Carrillo, E., Tamayo, M., and Nuño, L., La formación de la agenda pública. Análisis comparado de las demandas de hombres y mujeres hacia el sistema político (2013), Political Studies Collection, Madrid: Political and Constitutional Studies Center, ISBN 9788425915635
- Nuño Gómez, Laura and De Miguel Álvarez, Ana (dirs.), Fernández Montes, Lidia (coord.), Elementos para una teoría crítica del sistema prostitucional (2017), Granada, Editorial Comares, ISBN 9788490455043

=== Journal articles and book chapters ===
- "Avances en la igualdad de género desde una perspectiva internacional". Revista Gaceta sindical. Reflexión y Debate, No. 12/June 2009
- "El origen de las políticas de género: la evolución legislativa y las políticas de igualdad en el estado español" in Estudios Interdisciplinares sobre Igualdad (2009), Iustel
- "Análisis comparado del tratamiento de la conciliación de vida familiar y laboral en los países de la Unión Europea" (2010), Revista General de Derecho Público Comparado, No. 6
- "El empleo femenino en España y en la Unión Europea" (2010), Revista Instituto de Investigaciones Feministas, Complutense University of Madrid, Feminist Research. Women's, Feminist, and Gender Studies Papers.
- "Evolución de la política comunitaria en materia de empleo: igualdad de género y conciliación de vida familiar y laboral" (2010), Revista Europea de Derechos Fundamentales, No. 14
- "Diversidad y ciudadanía" (2011), in Terol, M.J. Igualdad e Integración. Editorial: Tirant lo Blanch
- Nuño L. and Fernández Montes, L., "Pensamos con palabras; en femenino" (2011), in Guía para periodistas: fuentes y recursos para informar sobre el Sur, Plataforma 2015
- "Los recortes en la educación pública madrileña: son cuentos, no cuentas", in Soberanía Alimentaria: Biodiversidad y Culturas No. 7
- Nuño Gómez, L. and San José, B., "Recortes y reformas minan la igualdad" (2011), in Revista Soberanía Alimentaria: Biodiversidad y Culturas No. 4
- "La respuesta patriarcal a la crisis: un nuevo timo para las mujeres", 2011 Yearbook, First of May Foundation
- "Género, desigualdad y violencia", in Nuño, L. (coord.). Monograph "Violencia y Derechos Humanos" of Revista Europea de Derechos Fundamentale No. 19, 1st Semester 2012
- "La gestión social del cuidado: Nuevos tiempos, viejas reglas" (2012), in Figueruelo, A., Del Pozo, M., and León. M, ¿Por qué no hemos alcanzado la igualdad?, Andavira
- "La Reforma constitucional" (2012), in Álvarez Conde, E. and Souto Galván, C., La constitucionalización de la estabilidad presupuestaria, Iustel Institute of Public Rights (Series: Contemporary Legal Problems)
- Nuño, L. and Torres, P. Martínez, "Trabajo y empleo" (2012), in La transversalidad de género en las políticas públicas de discapacidad, CERMI Cermi, Ediciones Cinca. Adaptation and translation into English by Pérez Bueno, C. as Work and Employment, Guide to Gender Mainstreaming in Public Disability Policies
- "El tratamiento de los estereotipos y de la violencia de género en el cine: ¿Una cuestión de derechos humanos o de libertad de creación?", 3rd edition, in Nuñez, T. and Troyano, Y. (coord.), La Violencia machista en el cine: materiales para una intervención psico-social, Delta, University Publications
- Trabajo y Estado de Bienestar desde la perspectiva de género (2012), Atenea, Feminist Studies
- "La desigualdad de género como problema público: prioridades, reacciones y estrategias" (2012), in La transversalidad de género en los objetivos de CC.OO.
- "Situación y pronóstico de la desigualdad de género en España" (2013), Revista Gaceta Sindical. Reflexión y Debate No. 20 (monograph: "La lucha por la Igualdad")
- "Violencia y deshumanización de las mujeres: la gran sombra en la protección internacional de los Derechos Humanos" (2013), in Figueruelo, A. Del Pozo, M., and León, M., Violencia de Género, una cuestión de Derechos Humanos, Comares
- "La educación y el mito de la diferencia sexual: avances, retrocesos y nudos críticos del caso español", in Anuario Derecho a la Educación, Dyckinson
- "Efectos de la crisis española en los derechos de las mujeres", in Frónesis: Revista de filosofía jurídica, social y política. Vol. 21. No. 1 (January–April 2014)
- "La igualdad no daba igual", in Revista con la a, Vol. 31, "Más feminismo, por favor" (March 2014)
- "Desigualdad y educación: modelo pedagógico y mito de la complementariedad", in Revista Europea de Derechos Fundamentales, Vol. 25
