= Celia Amorós =

Spanish philosopher

Celia Amorós Puente
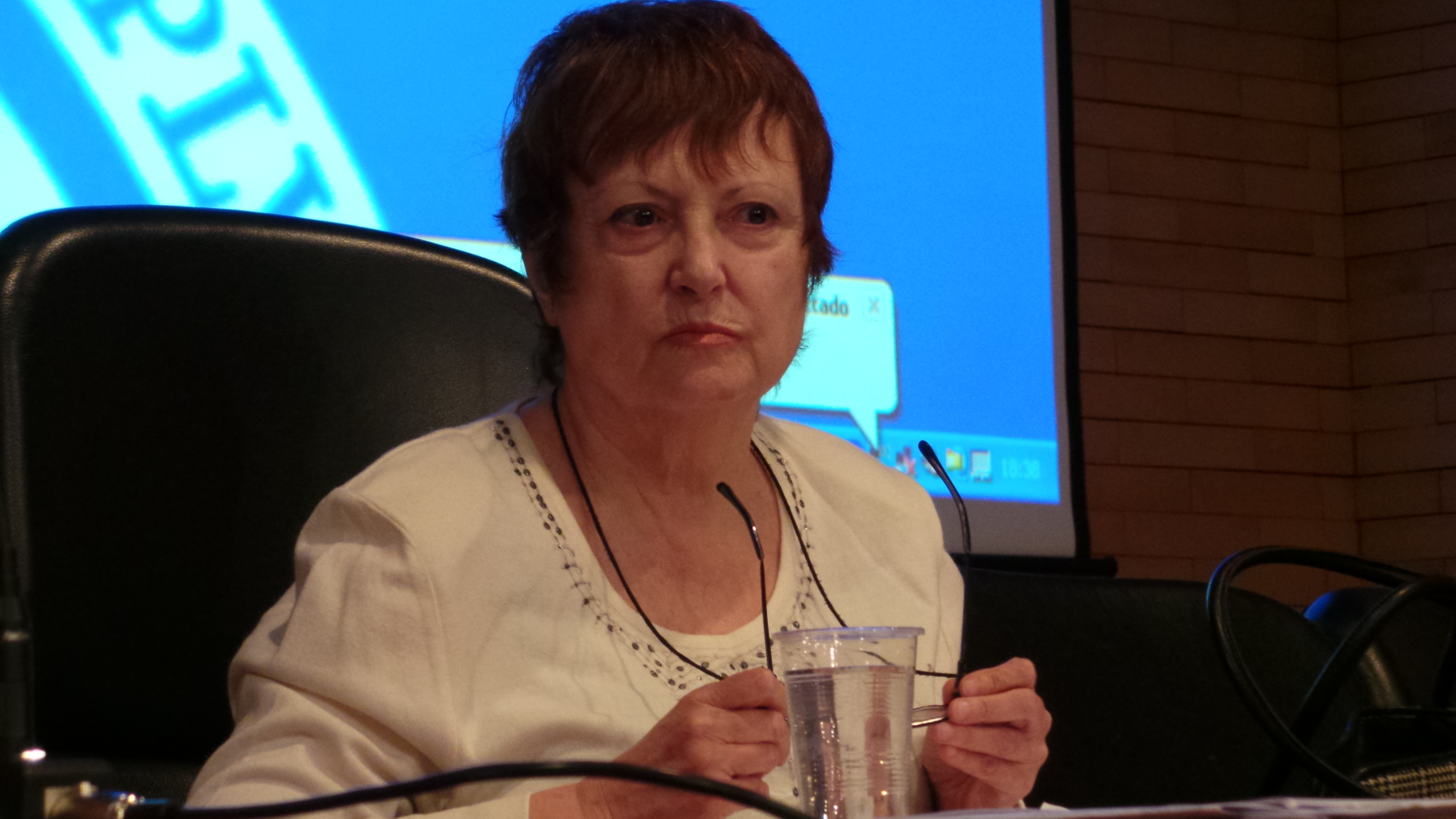
- Celia Amorós in 2013
- Born: 1 January 1944 (age 82); Valencia Spain
- Education: University of Valencia
- Occupations: Philosopher and essayist. Professor of philosophy in the National University of Distance Education
- Writing career
- Genres: Essays and articles
- Notable awards: Premio María Espinosa de Ensayo (1980) Premio nacional de ensayo (2006); Medal for "Promoción de los Valores de Igualdad" (2011) Premio Clara Campoamor (2016)

Celia Amorós Puente (born 1 January 1944 in Valencia) is a Spanish philosopher, essayist and supporter of feminist theory. She is a key figure in the so-called equality feminism and focused an important part of her research in the building of relations between Enlightenment and feminism. Her book Hacia una crítica de la razón patriarcal constitutes a new outlook on the gender perspective (gender studies) of philosophy, revealing the biases of androcentrism and claims a critical review on behalf of women.

She is a professor and member of the Department of Philosophy and Moral and Political Philosophy at the National University of Distance Education, known in Spanish as UNED. Her main research interests are the processes of Enlightenment and its implications for feminism and women in Islam, Human rights and women's rights in the context of multiculturalism. In 2006 she became the first woman to win the National Essay Prize.

== Biography ==
Amorós graduated with a degree in Philosophy from the University of Valencia in 1969 and received the Extraordinary Degree Award in 1970. The title of her thesis was: El concepto de razón dialéctica en Jean Paul Sartre (The Concept of Dialectical Reason of Jean Paul Sartre). She also completed her doctorate at the Faculty of Philosophy at the University of Valencia. The title of her doctoral thesis was: Ideología y pensamiento mítico: en torno a Mitologías de Claude Levi-Strauss (Ideology and Mythical Thought: Around Mythologies of Claude Levi-Strauss).

She is an expert in the ethical-political thought of Jean Paul Sartre and the history of existentialism. In relation to this field, included in her work are Sören Kierkegaard o la subjetividad del caballero (1987) and Diáspora y Apocalipsis. Ensayos sobre el Nominalismo de Jean Paul Sartre's Nominalism (2001).

She was a member of the Frente de Liberación de la Mujer (English: Women's Liberation Front) in Madrid until 1980. That same year she received the prize "Maria Espinosa de Ensayo" for the best article published about feminism for her work "Feminism and political parties" in Zona Abierta, Spring 1980.

In 1987 she created the Feminism and Enlightenment Seminar taught at the Faculty of Philosophy at the Complutense University of Madrid until 1994.

On 14 November 1990, she became director of the Institute for Feminist Research (Instituto de Investigación Feminista) after a first foundational phase managed by María Carmen García Nieto. She led the institute until 1993, in this year Amorós began her stay at Harvard University.

In 1991 she founded the History of Feminist Theory course at the Feminist Research Institute that she directed until 2005 and was replaced by the philosopher Ana de Miguel. The courses taught by Amorós were "Feminism and Multiculturalism," "Feminism and the Enlightenment," "Freudo-Marxism Feminism of Shulamith Firestone," and "The Ontology of the Present of Donna Haraway."

In 2006 she received the National Essay Prize for her work "La gran diferencia y sus pequeñas consecuencias.... para la lucha de las mujeres" (2004), becoming the first woman to receive this award. Worth 15,000 euros, the prize honours the thoughts and reflections of a Spanish author for his or her work in any of the official state languages published in the year previous to the verdict.

A member and professor of the UNED's Department of Philosophy and Moral and Political Philosophy, she is distinguished for her work and research on feminism and multiculturalism. Amorós considers that traces of the Enlightenment can be found in many different cultures, particularly in Islamic culture and searches for a meeting point in the construction of equality between women from different cultural backgrounds.

== Awards and distinctions ==
- 1980 Maria Espinosa Essay Award for the best article published on issues of feminism: "Feminismo y partidos políticos", published in Zona Abierta, Spring 1980.
- 2006 National Essay Prize.
- 2011 Medal "Promotion of Equality Values" granted by the Ministry of Health, Social Services and Equality.
- 2016 Clara Campoamor Award granted by the municipal government of Madrid (2016) for her contributions to the advancement of equality between men and women.

== Main work ==
=== Books ===
- Ideología y pensamiento mítico (Ideology and mythical thought) 1973
- Hacia una crítica de la razón patriarcal (Towards a critique of patriarchal reason), Barcelona, Anthropos, 1985, 1991
- Sören Kierkegaard o la subjetividad del caballero (Sören Kierkegaard or subjectivity Knight), Barcelona, Anthropos, 1987
- Espacio de los iguales, espacio de las idénticas. Notas sobre poder y principio de individuación (The same space, the same space. Notes on power and principle of individualization), in Arbor, no. 503-504
- Tiempo de feminismo. Sobre feminismo, proyecto ilustrado y posmodernidad (Time of feminism. About Feminism, Enlightenment project and postmodernity). Madrid, Chair, Col. Feminism, 1997.
- El feminismo: senda no transitada de la Ilustración (Feminism: untraveled path of the Enlightenment in lsegoría.) Revista de Filosofía Moral y Política, no. 1, 1990, Institute of Philosophy, CSIC, p. 139
- Sartre. Introducción y Antología de textos (Sartre. Introduction and Anthology of texts.) Editorial Anthropos.
- Patriarcalismo y razón ilustrada, en Razón y Fe (Patriarchy and enlightened reason in Reason and Faith), nos. 113–114, July–August 1991
- Los escritos póstumos de Sartre (I) y (II) (Posthumous writings of Sartre (I) and (II)), Journal of Philosophy, 3 ~ era, vol. III and IV, Madrid Complutense University
- El nuevo aspecto de la polis (The new aspect of the polis), in La balsa de la Medusa, nos. 5.
- Feminismo y Etica (Feminism and Ethics), C. Amoros (ed.), Isegoría monograph. Revista de Filosofía Moral y Política, nos. 5, 1992.
- Feminismo, Ilustración y misoginia romántica (Feminism, Enlightenment and romantic misogyny) in Birulés and others, Filosofía y género, Identidades femeninas Pamplona, Pamiela, 1992
- Feminismo: igualdad y diferencia (Feminism: equality and difference), PUEG Books Collection, UNAM, Mexico, 1994
- 10 palabras clave sobre Mujer (10 keywords on women), Estella (Navarra), Verbo Divino, 1995
- Tiempo de feminismo. Sobre feminismo, proyecto ilustrado y posmodernidad (The time of feminism. About Feminism, Enlightenment project and postmodernity). Madrid, Chair, Col. Feminism, 1997.
- Feminismo y Filosofía (Feminism and Philosophy), Amoros, C., (ed.) et alt. Madrid, Edit. Overview
- Diáspora y Apocalipsis. Estudios sobre el nominalismo de J.P.Sartre (Diaspora and Revelation. Studies nominalismo of Jean – Paul Sartre), Valencia, Eds. Alfons the Magnanimous, (2001). Pending publication.
- Mujer, participación y cultura política (Woman, participation and political culture) 1990 Buenos Aires, Editions of the Flower. Reissued with the title of Feminismo; igualdad y diferencia (Feminism; equality and difference), Mexico, PUEG Books, UNAM, 1994. 1fst Edition
- La gran diferencia y sus pequeñas consecuencias... Para la emancipación de las mujeres (The big difference and its small consequences ... For the emancipation of women), Madrid, Chair, Collection Feminisms, 2004.
- Teoría feminista. De la Ilustración a la globalización (Feminist theory. From Enlightenment to globalization) Celia Amorós and Ana de Miguel (eds.) (3 vols.), Madrid, eds. Minerva. 2005
- Vetas de ilustración: Reflexiones sobre feminismo e islam (Streaks of Enlightenment: Reflections on Feminism and Islam) Madrid, Editorial Chair 2009

=== Editions of books ===
- Entering and editing the special issue Ética y Feminismo ( Ethics and Feminism). Isegoría. Revista del Instituto de Filosofía del Consejo Superior de Investigaciones Científicas, No. 6, Madrid, 15 nov. June 1992

=== Translations ===
- Godelier, M., Horizons, trajets, Marxistes in Anthropologie (Paris, Maspero, 1973) with the title of Economía, Fetichismo y Religión, Madrid, Siglo XXI Eds., 1974.
- Galton y Schamble, Problemas de la Filosofía Contemporánea, Madrid, Grijalbo, 1978.
- Some articles among those included in J.Vidal Beneyto ed., Análisis estructural del relato, Madrid, ed. National, 1982.
- Revision of the translation of John Valmar, Being and Nothingness, of Jean-Paul Sartre, Madrid, Alianza Editorial, 1984.
- Translation of Jean – Paul Sartre, Critique de la Raison Dialectique commissioned by Alianza Editorial. Not yet published.

=== Publications about the author ===
- Un pensamiento intempestivo: la razón emancipatoria ilustrada en la filosofía de Celia Amorós (Untimely thought: emancipatory enlightened reason in the philosophy of Celia Amoros), 1999, by Alicia Puleo. Magazine Isegoría 21. (Online).
- Filosofía y feminismo en Celia Amorós (2006) (Philosophy and Feminism of Celia Amoros). By Luisa Posada Kubissa. In Labrys, Feminist Studies. (Online).
- Pensar con Celia Amorós (2010) (Think with Celia Amoros). Editorial Fundamentos 2010. Tribute book edited by philosophers Marian López Cao and Luisa Posada Kubissa, of the Feminist Research Institute (Universidad Complutense de Madrid), with the collaboration of other feminist thinkers Amelia Valcárcel, Alicia Puleo and María Luisa Femenías.
