= Nuno Gomes (footballer, born 1980) =

Portuguese footballer

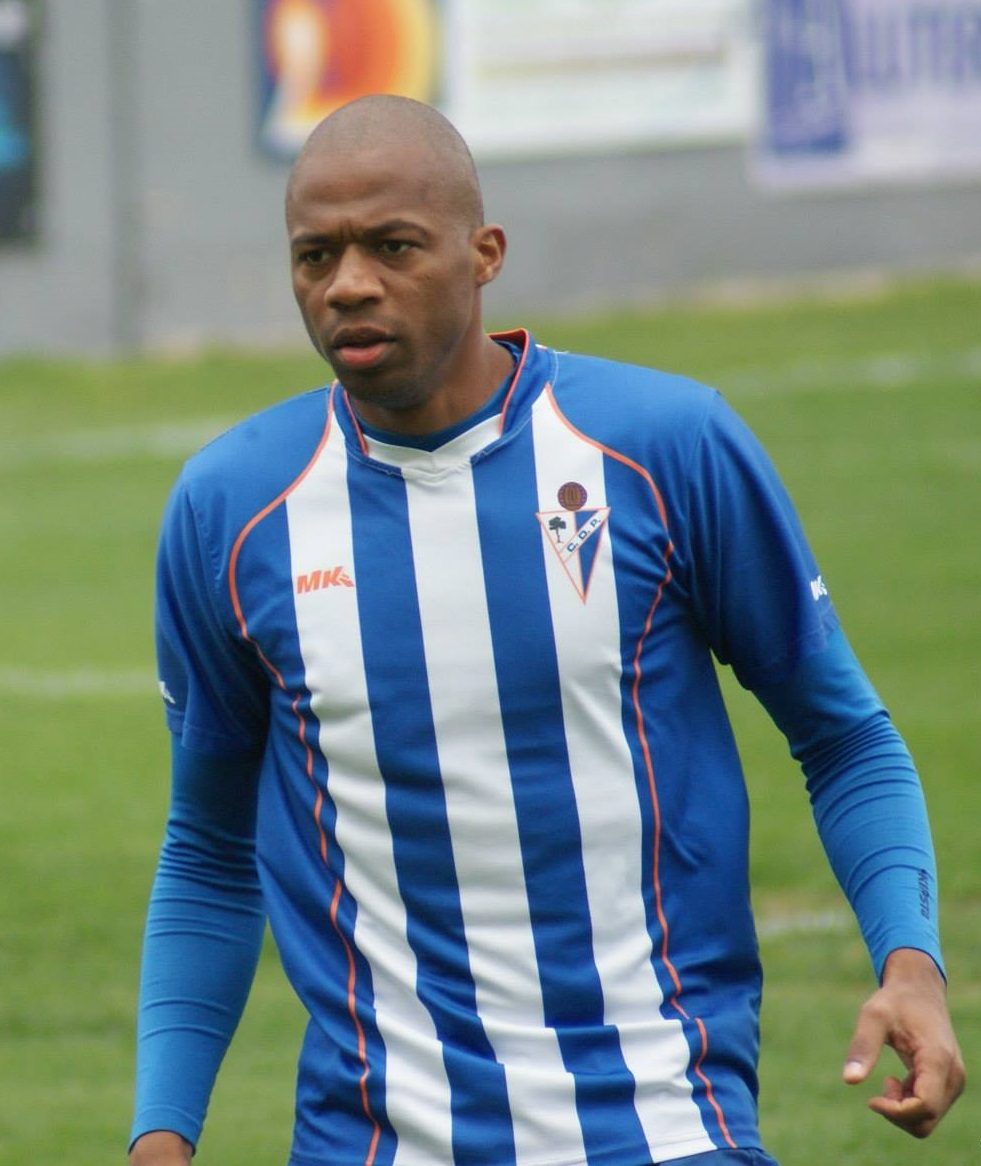
- Gomes in 2015

Personal information
- Full name: Nuno Manuel Soares Gomes
- Date of birth: 21 May 1980 (age 46)
- Place of birth: Lisbon, Portugal
- Height: 1.91 m (6 ft 3 in)
- Position: Forward

Youth career
- Vila Fria Oeiras

Senior career*
| Years | Team | Apps | (Gls) |
| 1999–2000 | Coruchense | | |
| 2000–2002 | Atlético Cacém | | |
| 2002–2004 | Sporting Lourel | | |
| 2004–2005 | Atlético Cacém | | |
| 2005 | Casa Pia | 12 | (2) |
| 2006 | Oeiras | | |
| 2006–2007 | Real Massamá | 28 | (15) |
| 2007–2008 | Fátima | 21 | (1) |
| 2008 | Progresul București | 2 | (1) |
| 2009 | Chaves | 8 | (1) |
| 2009–2010 | Atlético | 14 | (1) |
| 2010–2011 | Mafra | 29 | (23) |
| 2011 | 1º Agosto | | |
| 2012–2013 | Mafra | 12 | (2) |
| 2013 | União Montemor | 5 | (2) |
| 2013–2014 | Pinhalnovense | 26 | (20) |
| 2014 | Mafra | 6 | (0) |
| 2014–2015 | Cova Piedade | 20 | (6) |
| 2015–2016 | Vilafranquense | 28 | (6) |
| 2017 | Oeiras | | |
| 2018 | Linda-a-Velha | | |
| Total | | 211 | (80) |
- * Club domestic league appearances and goals

Nuno Manuel Soares Gomes (born 21 May 1980 in Lisbon) is a Portuguese former footballer who played as a forward.
