= Victoria Camps =

Spanish philosopher (born 1941)

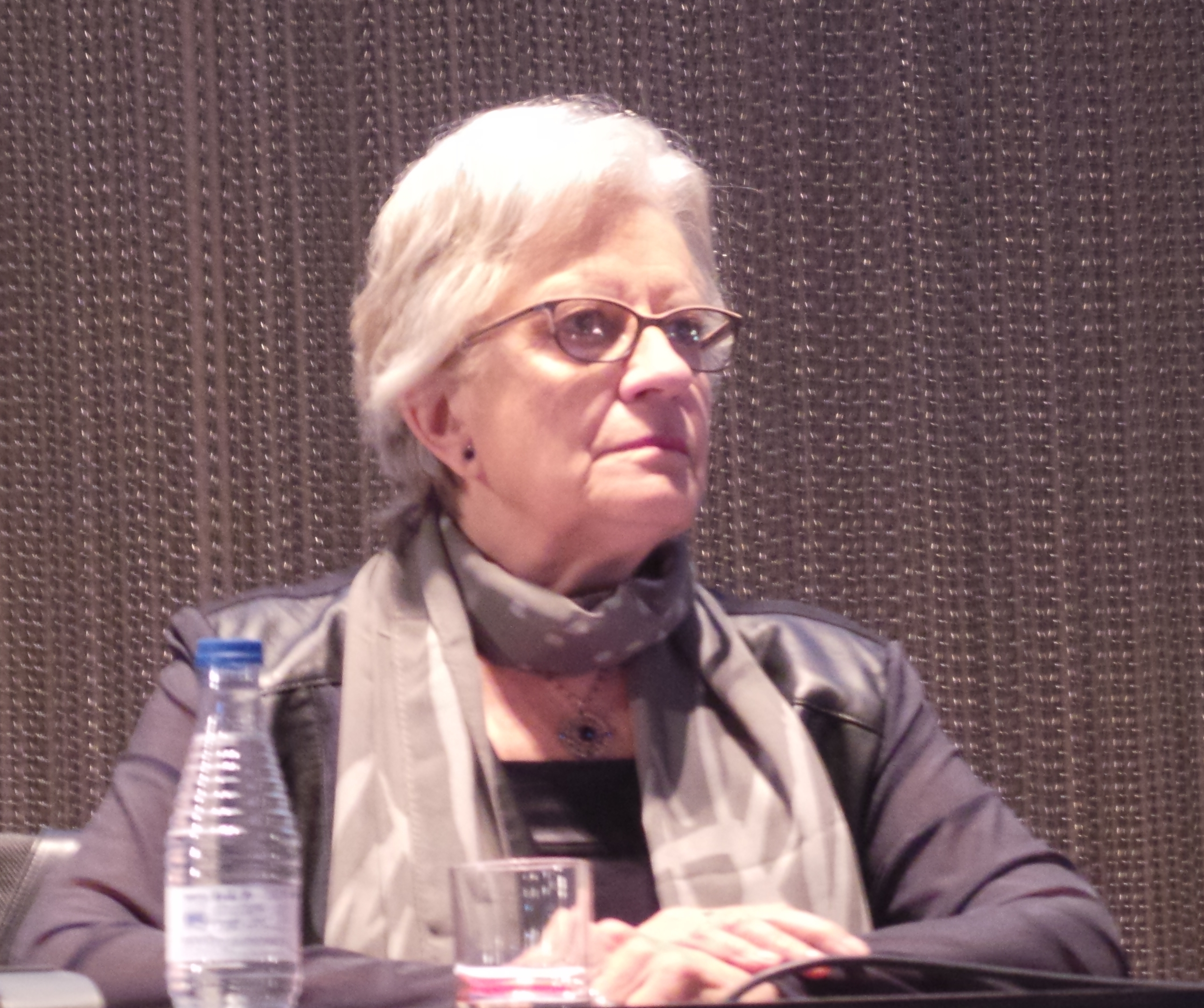
- Victoria Camps in 2016.
- Born: February 21, 1941 (age 85); Barcelona, Spain
- Occupations: Politics, philosopher, writer
- Political party: PSC-PSOE
- Website: Victoria Camps Cervera

Victoria Camps (born 1941, Barcelona) is a Spanish philosopher and professor of ethics.

== Career ==
She obtained a degree in philosophy at the University of Barcelona, completing her thesis, entitled “La dimensión pragmática del lenguaje”, in 1975.

She has been the vice-rector, lecturer and full professor of ethics at the Autonomous University of Barcelona. She has participated in the bioethics committees of the Hospital del mar and of the Hospital de la Vall d’Hebron.

Between 1993 and 1996 she was a senator for the Socialists' Party of Catalonia.

She is currently a member of the Bioethics Committee of Spain and collaborates in journals such as “Isegoría” and “Letra internacional”. As a philosopher, she is considered an influential author and a notable inheritor of the thought of philosophers José Luis Aranguren and José Luis Ferrater Mora.

Her work and ideas cover a vast arrays of topics, from pragmatics to theology, and from the exclusion of women from work to ideals of well-being and citizenship in the modern state, together with ethics in communication and in public representation.

== Awards ==
In 2008 she became the 22nd recipient of the Menéndez Pelayo International Prize.

== Bibliography ==
- Los teólogos de la muerte de Dios, 1968.
- Pragmática del lenguaje y filosofía analítica, 1976.
- La imaginación ética, 1983;
- Ética, retórica y política, 1983.
- Virtudes públicas 1990.
- Paradojas del individualismo, 1993.
- Los valores de la educación, 1994.
- El malestar de la vida pública, 1994.
- El siglo de las mujeres, 1998.
- Manual de civismo 1998.
- Qué hay que enseñar a los hijos, 2000.
- Una vida de calidad: reflexiones sobre bioética, 2002.
- La voluntad de vivir, 2005.
- Hablemos de Dios 2007 written in collaboration with Amelia Valcarcel
- Creer en la educación, 2008.
- El gobierno de las emociones, 2011.
- Breve historia de la ética, 2013.
