= Amelia Valcárcel =

Spanish philosopher

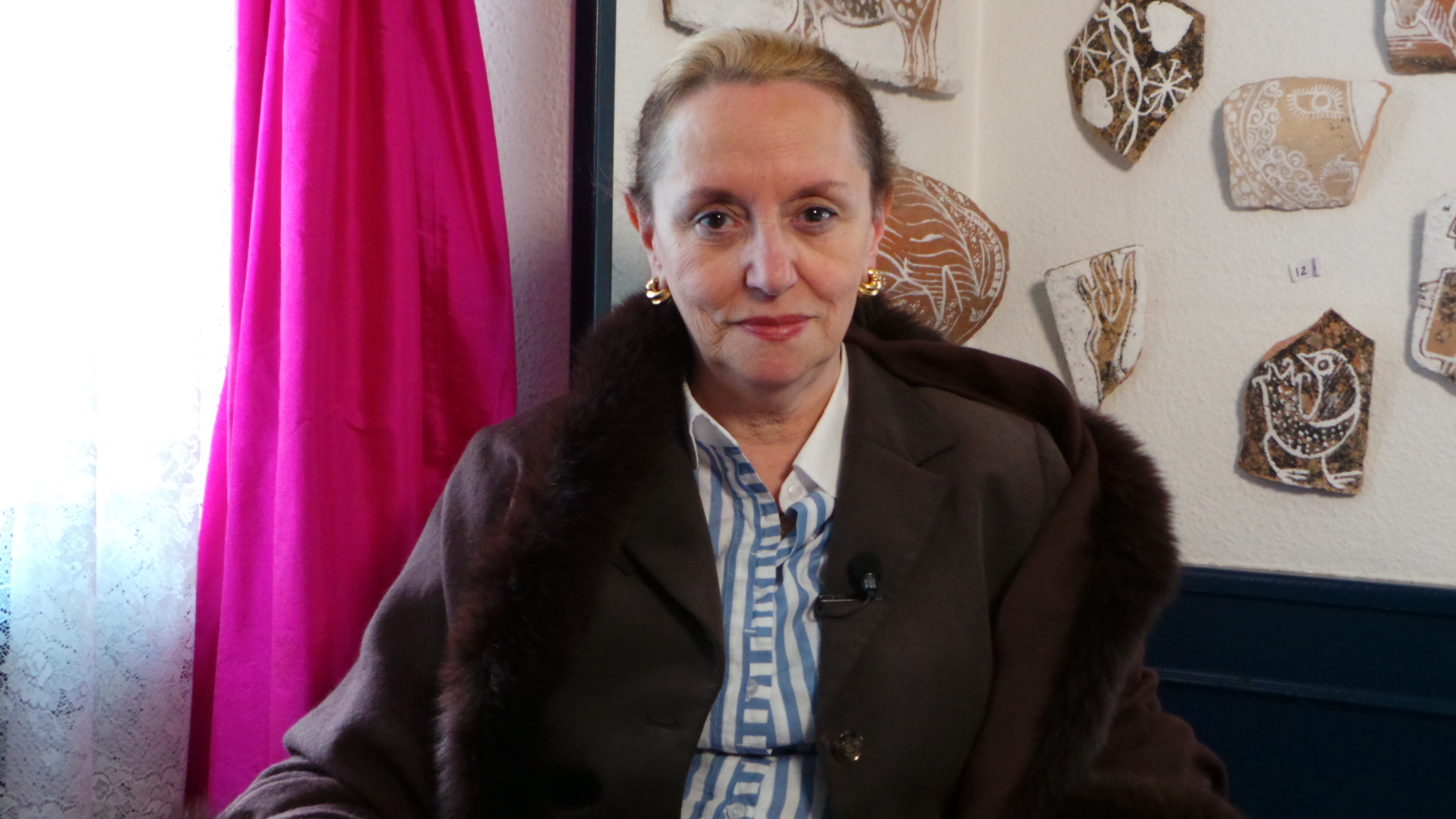
- Born: November 16, 1950 (age 75); Madrid, Spain

Philosophical work
- Era: 20th / 21st-century philosophy
- Region: Western philosophy
- School: Continental philosophy; Third-wave feminism; Critical theory; Postmodernism; Global studies
- Main interests: Feminist theory; Political philosophy; Ethics; History of women´s freedom; Discourse; Embodiment; Religion
- Notable ideas: Feminism; Multiculturalism; Illustration

Amelia Valcárcel (November 16, 1950) is a Spanish philosopher and feminist. She is considered within the "philosophic feminism" as part of the "equality feminism" approach. She has been a member of the Spanish Council of State since 2006, and has been a professor in Moral and Political Philosophy at the National University of Distance Education since 2015.

In recent years she has also been noted for her public activity against the 2023 "Trans Law" as well as for other controversies surrounding LGBTQ+ rights. She has been cited as one of the most visible faces of the TERF movement in Spain, a movement that considers transgender women to be men, and which aims to exclude them from feminist spaces.

== Early life and education ==
Valcárcel was born in Madrid. She studied philosophy at the Universities of Oviedo and Valencia, in Spain.

== Professional life ==
Valcárcel worked at the University of Oviedo for three decades, before becoming Professor in Moral and Political Philosophy at the National University of Distance Education.

She has participated and organized numerous seminars and conferences in the fields of Philosophy, moral values and women’s rights. She has been also taken part in national and international panels and boards, as well as playing an advisory role at editorial and journal boards. She was the director of the magazine Leviatán.

Valcárcel is actively engaged in public affairs in Spain. She has performed various public roles, including State Counsellor and vice-president of the Real Patronage of the Museo del Prado. Between 1993 and 1995, she was Counsellor for Education, Culture, Sports and Youth in the regional government of Asturias.

== Philosophy and feminism ==
Valcárcel's academic life has been mainly devoted to two academic fields: philosophy and feminist studies.

Within the subject area of Feminist Philosophy, Valcárcel is considered to be part of the equality feminism approach. Her most distinctive contribution to the field of feminist thinking has been to place feminism within the canonic history of political philosophy, especially in her monograph Feminismo en el mundo global (2008). She has written several manuscripts, some of them translated into other languages. Her theoretical thinking is close to that of the equally well-known Spanish philosophers Celia Amorós and Victoria Camps.

Valcárcel takes the philosophical position that the nexus between women is not the nature or essence of themselves, opposite to the difference feminism arguments, it is however the patriarchal and hetero-designation, the role which patriarchal assigns to women (mother, daughter, espouse and prostitute...) and especially the role women occupy in society which has been depicted by men. Likewise, the role and common denominator that all women share is their functional status (submission) different from men.

== Writings ==
- Hegel y la Ética (1989) (Heguel and Ethic)
- Sexo y Filosofía (1991) (Sex and Philosophy)
- Del miedo a la igualdad (1993) (From Fear to Equality). Finalist of the National Essay Book Prize 1994
- La política de las mujeres (1997) (Women’s politics)
- Ética contra estética (1998) (Ethic against Aesthetic)
- Rebeldes (2000) (Rebels)
- Ética para un mundo global (2002) (Ethic for a global world)
- Hablemos de Dios (2007) (Let’s Talk of God) co-authored with Victoria Camps.
- Feminismo en un mundo global (2009) (Feminism in a global world)
- La memoria y el perdón (2010) (Memory and forgiveness)

== Editions ==
- El Concepto de Igualdad (The Concept of Equality)
- Los Desafíos del Feminismo en el siglo XXI (The Challenges of Feminism in the 21st Century)
- Pensadoras del siglo XX (Thinkers of the 20th Century)
- El sentido de la Libertad (The Meaning of Freedom)
- El Debate del voto femenino en la Constitución de 1931 (The Debate of Women's Suffrage in the Spanish 1931 Constitution)
- Feminismo, género e igualdad (Feminism, Gender and Equality)
