= University of A Coruña =

Public university in Galicia, Spain

Coordinates: 43°21′02.32″N 8°24′57.41″W

- Universidade da Coruña
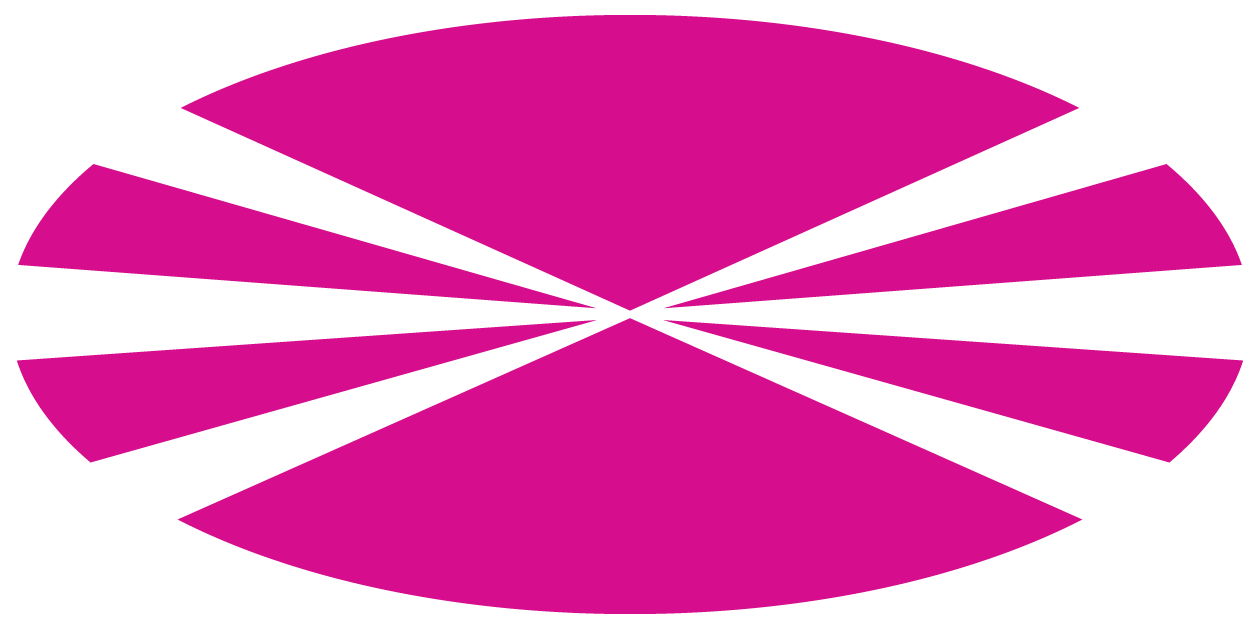
- Motto: Hac Luce
- Motto in English: In this light
- Type: Public
- Established: 1989
- Budget: 123,294,723 € (2018)
- Rector: Ricardo Cao Abad
- Academic staff: 1393 (2018)
- Administrative staff: 799 (2018)
- Students: 16847 (2018)
- Undergraduates: 13681 (2018)
- Postgraduates: 1976 (2018)
- Doctoral students: 1190 (2018)
- Location: A Coruña, A Coruña, Galicia, Spain
- Website: udc.es

The University of A Coruña (Galician: Universidade da Coruña) is a Spanish public university located in the city of A Coruña, Galicia. Established in 1989, university departments are divided between two primary campuses in A Coruña and nearby Ferrol. The A Coruña campus is spread over three suburbs on the outskirts of A Coruña: Elviña and Zapateira (near the site of the Battle of Elviña) and Oza (near the As Xubias zone).

== History ==
The first University in Galicia was founded 1495 in University of Santiago de Compostela, and it remained the only university in Galicia until the early 1980s when two university campuses (in A Coruña and Vigo) were formed from the University of Santiago de Compostela.

In the early 1960s, the School of Naval and Industrial Engineers of Ferrol was also established as a degree-granting institution by a Ministerial Order. Until 1990 the school was directly dependent on the Ministry of Education in Madrid. In 1990 the school was amalgamated with the University of A Coruña.

In the late 1980s, the two campuses of A Coruña and Vigo, originally part of University of Santiago de Compostela, became fully independent universities with the authority to issue their own university degrees.

In the early 1990s, the universities established further campuses of their own:

- University of Santiago de Compostela based in Santiago de Compostela, with a campus in Lugo
- University of A Coruña based in A Coruña, with a campus in Ferrol
- University of Vigo based in Vigo, with campuses in Ourense and Pontevedra

== Organization ==
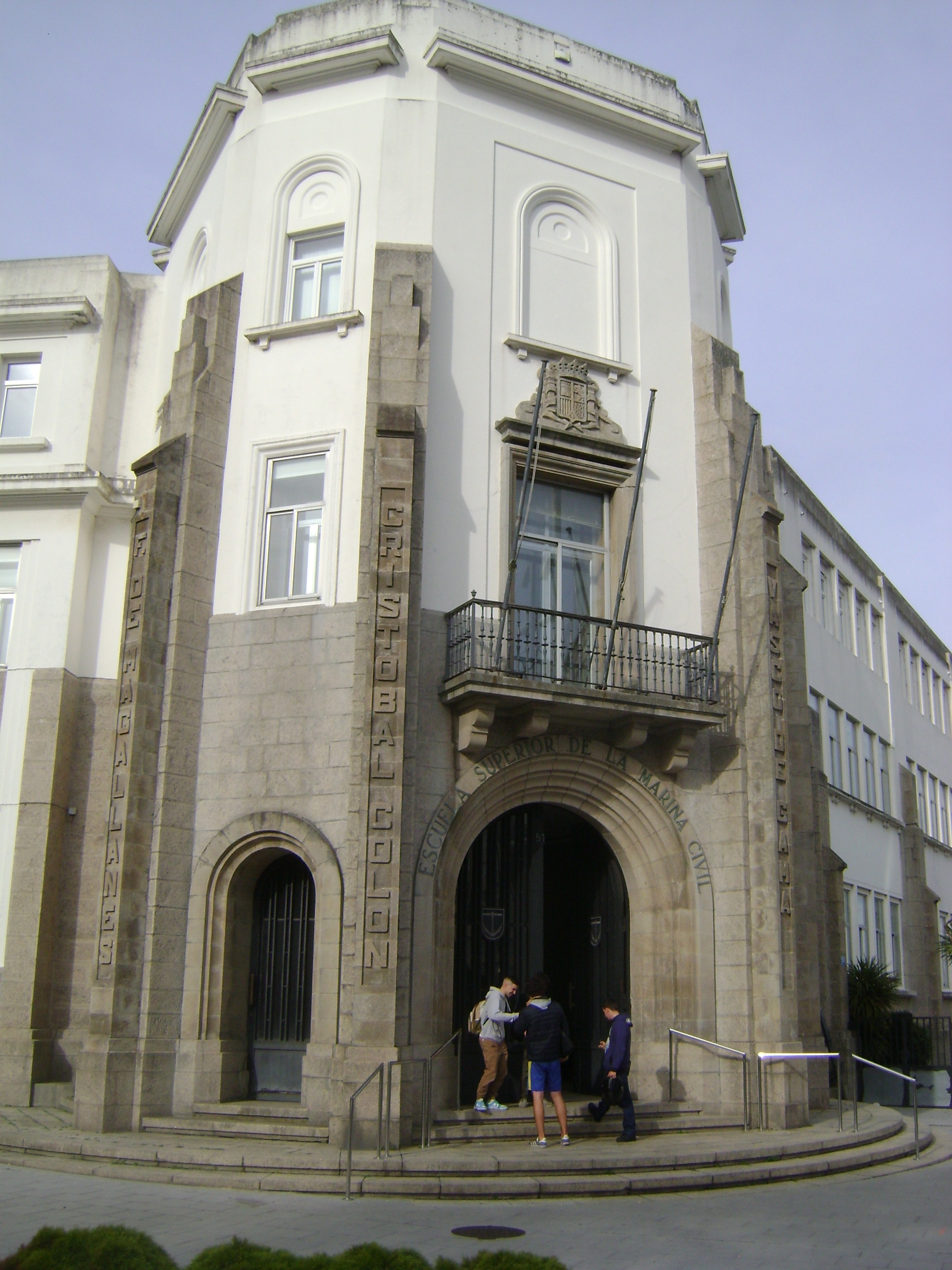
School of Nautical Science and Marine Engineering (La Coruña).

The University of A Coruña uses the open-source software Consul to let its members propose, debate and decide on issues in administration, teaching and budgeting.

== Notable faculty ==
- Rosa Cobo Bedía (born 1956), feminist, writer, and professor of sociology of gender at the University of A Coruña
- Amparo Alonso Betanzos, professor at University of A Coruña, where she leads the Laboratory for the Investigation and Development of Artificial Intelligence (LIDIA)

== Notable alumni ==
- Miguel Dongil y Sánchez (born 1987), historian

== See also ==
- University of Santiago de Compostela
- University of Vigo
