= Franziska Schutzbach =

Swiss sociologist

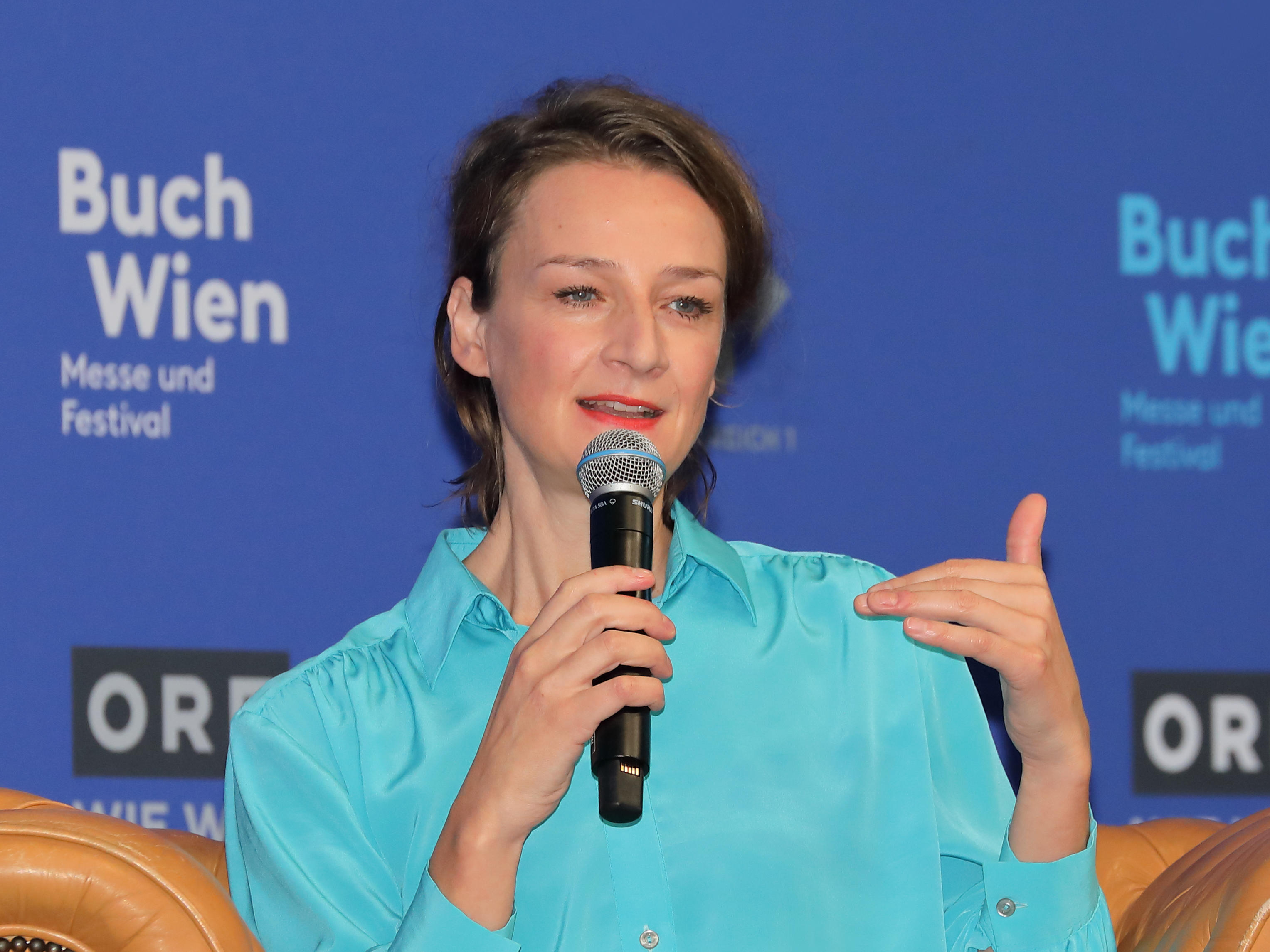
Franziska Schutzbach

Franziska Schutzbach (born 1978) is a gender researcher and sociologist living in Switzerland.

== Life and work ==
Franziska Schutzbach studied sociology, media studies and gender studies at the University of Basel and graduated in 2008 with a master's degree. She defended her doctorate in 2019 at the Graduate School of Social Sciences at the University of Basel with her dissertation on "Population politics, gender and health. The example of the World Health Organization" (Politiken der Generativität. Reproduktive Gesundheit, Bevölkerung und Geschlecht. Das Beispiel der Weltgesundheitsorganisation).

Her research, teaching and publications focus on reproductive politics and gender relations, right-wing populism and anti-feminism. Her 2018 published book, "The Rhetoric of the Right: an overview of right-wing populist discourse strategies" detailed how the right-wing uses strategies of free expression to add their rhetoric to the public sphere.

In her text Dominant masculinity and neo-reactionary world views in the pick-up artist scene, Schutzbach dealt with the "radicalization and politicization of the masculine scene". She specifically looked at pick-up artists who started in the US as a kind of support group for insecure men who wanted to learn to "conquer" women, and are now active in blogs and forums, but also offline, in large parts of the world. According to Inga Barthels in the Der Tagesspiegel, Schutzbach documents how this group increasingly works together with right-wing nationalist movements and analyzes the connections between anti-gender discourses, anti-feminism and right-wing populism, which were observed throughout the Western world.

Schutzbach continues to write, with ten articles with "Geschichte der Gegenwart" (History of the Present), an online magazine with Swiss and German topics.

She co-started the hashtag #SchweizerAufschrei (Swiss outcry) to encourage the public discussion of sexual assault in Switzerland.

She sits on the board of Terre des Femmes Switzerland and is one of the members of the Basel-Stadt Equality Commission.

== Selected publications ==
- Rhetoric of the Right: An overview of right-wing populist discourse strategies (Rhetorik der Rechten: Rechtspopulistische Diskursstrategien im Überblick). Xanthippe, Zurich/Munich 2018, ISBN 978-3-905795-60-8.
- Dominant masculinity and reactionary worldviews in the pick-up artist scene (Dominante Männlichkeit und reaktionäre Weltanschauungen in der Pick-Up-Artist-Szene). Feministische Studien 2018, S. 305–321.
- From antifeminism to <antigenderism> - A time-diagnostic view using the example of Switzerland (om Antifeminismus zum ‹Antigenderismus› – Eine zeitdiagnostische Betrachtung am Beispiel Schweiz). With Andrea Maihofer, Sabine Hark; Paula Villa (Hrsg.) (2015): (Anti) Genderism: Sexuality and gender as the scene of current political conflicts ((Anti-)Genderismus: Sexualität und Geschlecht als Schauplätze aktueller politischer Auseinandersetzungen). Transcript, Bielefeld 2015, ISBN 978-3-8376-3144-9.
- Population, crisis, nation (Bevölkerung, Krise, Nation). In: Karin Hostettler, Sophie Vögele (Hrsg.): This side of the imperial gender order. (Post-)colonial reflections on the west (Diesseits der imperialen Geschlechterordnung. (Post-)koloniale Reflexionen über den Westen). Transcript Verlag, Bielefeld 2014, ISBN 978-3-8376-2343-7, S. 77–106
- Die Erschöpfung der Frauen. Wider die weibliche Verfügbarkeit. Droemer HC, Munich 2021, ISBN 978-3-4262-7858-1.
- Revolution der Verbundenheit - Wie weibliche Solidarität die Gesellschaft verändert. Droemer HC, Munich 2024, ISBN 978-3-426-27904-5
