= Eva Rieger =

German musicologist (born 1940)

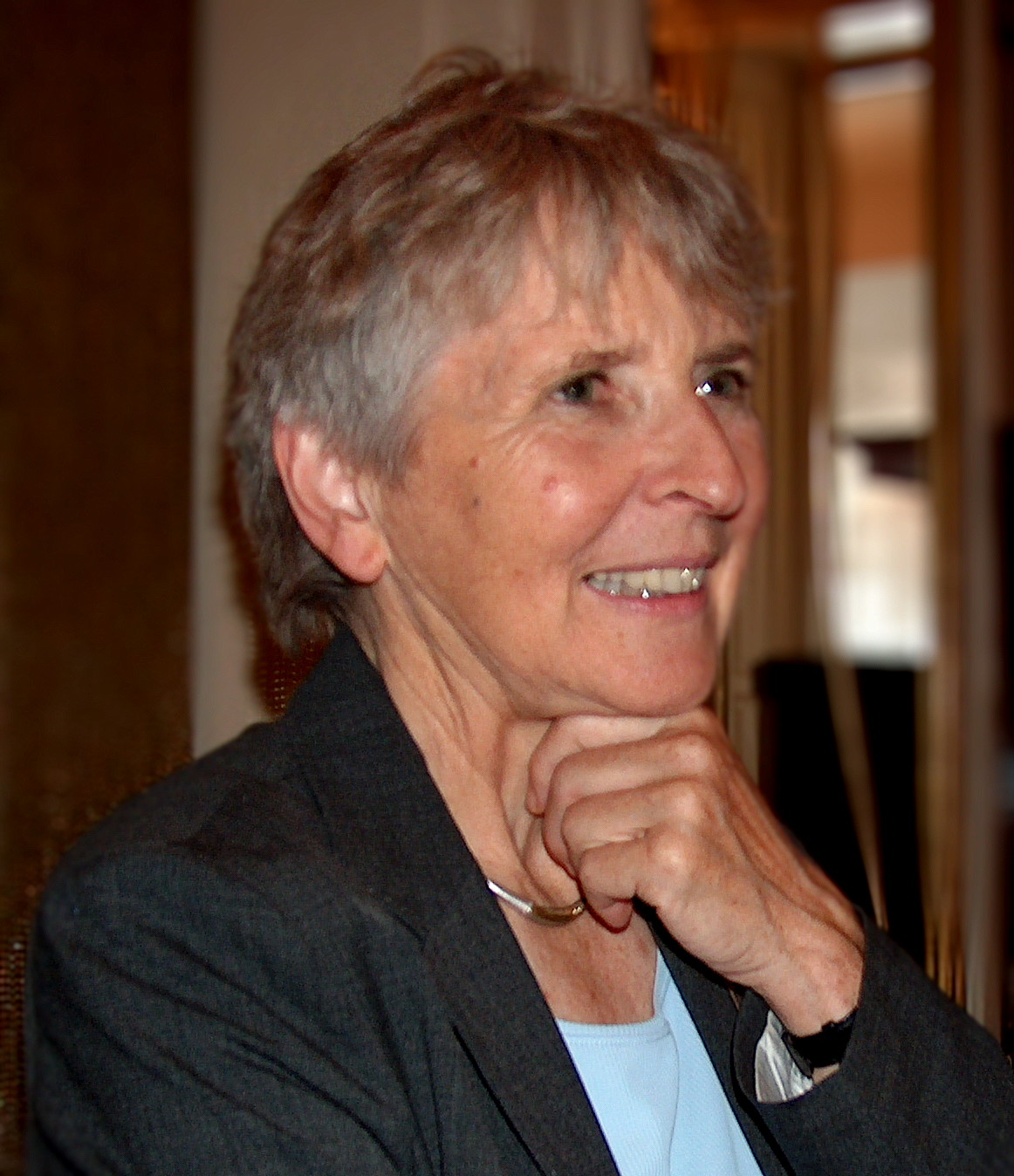
Eva Rieger

Eva Rieger (born November 21, 1940, Isle of Man) is a German musicologist. Rieger specialized in the social and cultural history of women in music. Together with the German-Swiss patron Mariann Steegmann, Rieger founded the Mariann-Steegmann-Foundation, which is dedicated to the advancement of women in music and the arts. In 2012, she was appointed Honorary Senator of the Hochschule für Musik und Theater Hamburg.

== Early years and education ==
Eva Rieger was born to German parents - pastor Julius Rieger and librarian Johanna Rieger (née Krüger). They moved to Berlin in 1953. Eva studied music education, musicology, and English at Technische Universität Berlin, and earned her doctorate in 1976 with a thesis on music education in East Germany.

== Career ==
From 1978 to 1991, Rieger was an Academic Councilor at the University of Göttingen and the University of Hildesheim. From 1991 onwards, she was a Professor of Historical Musicology at the University of Bremen, with a focus on the social history of music. Rieger also was a member of the Advisory Board for the journal Feminist Studies (German: Feministische Studien) from 1988 to 1992.

Rieger has given lectures in the United States, Canada, Japan, and Europe. In 1996, she co-founded the "Women and Gender Research" department at the German Society for Music Research. Rieger was an active participant and jury member at the "Feminist Theory and Music" conference in the United States on several occasions. In 2000, Rieger co-founded the Mariann Steegmann Foundation with Mariann Steegmann herself. This foundation operates the "Mariann Steegmann Art & Gender Institute" at the University of Bremen as well as the "Research Center for Music and Gender" at the Hochschule für Musik, Theater und Medien Hannover. In 2009 Rieger was Corresponding Member of the American Musicological Society.

== Research ==
Rieger's research focuses on gender issues in musical culture. She wrote a musicological study on the discrimination of women in German musical culture and used her work to advocate for the equality of women at all levels of musical culture. She has also written on film music, music education, and the life and works of Richard Wagner. Rieger has published several books in Great Britain, Sweden, Japan, and South Korea. Her articles have been published in journals such as Die Musikforschung, Archiv für Musikwissenschaft, Feministische Studien, and others.

== Selected works ==
- School Music Education in the GDR. (1977). (Doctoral Dissertation at Technische Universität Berlin; published in German as Schulmusikerziehung in der DDR by Diesterweg.) ISBN 978-3-425-03767-7.
- (as editor:) Woman and Music. (1980). (Published in German as Frau und Musik by Fischer-Taschenbücher; 2nd edition published in 1990 by Furore-Verlag.) ISBN 978-3-596-22257-5.
- Woman, Music and Men's Domination: On the Exclusion of Women from German Music Pedagogy, Musicology and Music Practice. (1981). (Published in German as Frau, Musik und Männerherrschaft. Zum Ausschluß der Frau aus der deutschen Musikpädagogik, Musikwissenschaft und Musikausübung by Ullstein Verlag; 2nd edition published in 1988 by Furore-Verlag; Japanese translation published in 1985; Korean translation published in 1988.) ISBN 978-3-548-35099-8.
- Peace Education in Music Lessons. (1987). (Published in German as Friedenserziehung im Musikunterricht by Gustav Bosse Verlag.) ISBN 978-3-764-92318-1.
- (as editor:) A Stormy Winter: Memories of a Pugnacious English Composer. (Autobiography of Ethel Smyth) (1988). (Published in German as Ein stürmischer Winter. Erinnerungen einer streitbaren englischen Komponistin by Bärenreiter-Verlag.) ISBN 978-3-761-80923-5.
- Nannerl Mozart: The Life of an Artist in the 18th Century. (1991). (Published in German as Nannerl Mozart. Leben einer Künstlerin im 18. Jahrhundert by Insel Verlag; revised edition published in 2005 by Insel Verlag; Swedish translation published in 1992.) ISBN 978-3-458-33131-5.
- Alfred Hitchcock and the Music: An Investigation into the Relationship between Film, Music and Gender. (1996). (Published in German as Alfred Hitchcock und die Musik. Eine Untersuchung zum Verhältnis von Film, Musik und Geschlecht by Kleine Verlag.) ISBN 978-3-893-70236-7.
- (as editor:) Women with Wings: Life Stories of Famous Pianists, from Clara Schumann to Clara Haskil. (1996). (Co-written by Monica Steegmann; published in German as Frauen mit Flügel: Lebensberichte berühmter Pianistinnen; von Clara Schumann bis Clara Haskill by Insel Verlag.) ISBN 978-3-458-33414-9.
- (as editor:) Women's Voices, Women's Roles in Opera and Women's Self-Testimonies. (2000). (Co-written by Gabriele Busch-Salmen; published in German as Frauenstimmen, Frauenrollen in der Oper und Frauen-Selbstzeugnisse by Centaurus Verlag.) ISBN 978-3-825-50279-9.
- (as editor:) With a Thousand Kisses, Your "Fillu": Letters of the Singer Marie Fillunger to Eugenie Schumann, 1875-93. (2002). (Published in German as „Mit tausend Küssen Deine Fillu“. Briefe der Sängerin Marie Fillunger an Eugenie Schumann 1875–93. by Dittrich Verlag.) ISBN 978-3-920-86242-2.
- (as editor:) Divine Voices: Life Stories of Famous Singers from Elisabeth Mara to Maria Callas. (2002). (Co-written by Monica Steegmann; published in German as Göttliche Stimmen. Lebensberichte berühmter Sängerinnen von Elisabeth Mara bis Maria Callas by Insel Verlag.) ISBN 978-3-458-34202-1.
- Minna and Richard Wagner: Stations of a Love. (2003). (Published in German as Minna und Richard Wagner. Stationen einer Liebe by Artemis & Winkler Verlag.) ISBN 978-3-538-07154-4.
- Shining Love, Laughing Death: Richard Wagner's Image of the Woman in the Mirror of his Music. (2009). (Published in German as Leuchtende Liebe, lachender Tod. Richard Wagners Bild der Frau im Spiegel seiner Musik by Artemis & Winkler Verlag.) ISBN 978-3-538-07270-1.
- A Place for Gods: Richard Wagner's Hikes in Switzerland. (2009). (Co-written by Hiltrud Schroeder; published in German as Ein Platz für Götter. Richard Wagners Wanderungen in der Schweiz by Böhlau Verlag.) ISBN 978-3-412-20409-9.
- Friedelind Wagner: The Rebellious Granddaughter of Richard Wagner. (2012). (Published as in German as Friedelind Wagner. Die rebellische Enkelin Richard Wagners by Piper Verlag.) ISBN 978-3-492-05489-8.
- Frida Leider: Singer in the Twilight of Her Time. (2016). (Co-written by Peter Sommeregger; foreword by Stephan Mösch; published in German as Frida Leider - Sängerin im Zwiespalt ihrer Zeit by Georg Olms Verlag.) ISBN 978-3-487-08579-1.
