= Marie Fillunger =

Austrian opera singer

- Born: 27 January 1850; Vienna, Austrian Empire
- Died: 23 December 1930 (aged 80); Interlaken, Switzerland
- Education: Vienna Conservatory; Hochschule in Berlin
- Occupations: Classical operatic; Voice teacher
- Organizations: Royal Manchester College of Music
- Partner: Eugenie Schumann

Marie Fillunger (27 January 1850 – 23 December 1930) was an Austrian singer, and the longtime partner of Eugenie Schumann, who was a daughter of Robert and Clara Schumann.

== Life ==
Fillunger was born in Vienna. She studied at the Vienna Conservatory from 1869 to 1873 under Mathilde Marchesi. Then, on the recommendation of Johannes Brahms she studied at the Hochschule in Berlin in 1874 under Amalie Joachim. There she met Eugenie Schumann the same year. Eugenie was one of the daughters of Clara and Robert Schumann, and she and Fillunger became lovers. Using the Schumann house as a base for a number of years, first in Berlin and then in Frankfurt from 1878, Fillunger left for England in January 1889 after a dispute with Eugenie's sister, Marie Schumann. Eugenie joined her in 1892, remaining there until 1912 when she rejoined Marie in Switzerland. Fillunger returned to Vienna.

In 1889 she sang in London and at the Crystal Palace in Beethoven's Choral Symphony. In England, Fillunger established herself as a highly regarded singer of lieder, particularly in the repertoire of Schubert and Brahms, who entrusted her with the premieres of many of his works. She toured Australia in 1891 and South Africa in 1895 with Sir Charles Hallé, eventually joining the teaching staff of the Royal Manchester College of Music from which she resigned before the outbreak of the First World War. Fillunger and Eugenie were reunited in 1919 in Matten near Interlaken in Switzerland.

== Death and legacy ==
Fillunger died in Interlaken. She is buried alongside Eugenie and Marie Schumann in the Gsteig cemetery in the nearby village of Wilderswil. An obituary can be read in The Musical Times, Vol. 72, No. 1056 (Feb. 1, 1931), pp. 175–176.

Her long relationship with Eugenie Schumann is discussed in a number of articles by German music historian Eva Rieger.
