= Friedrich Schlichtegroll =

German teacher and scholar

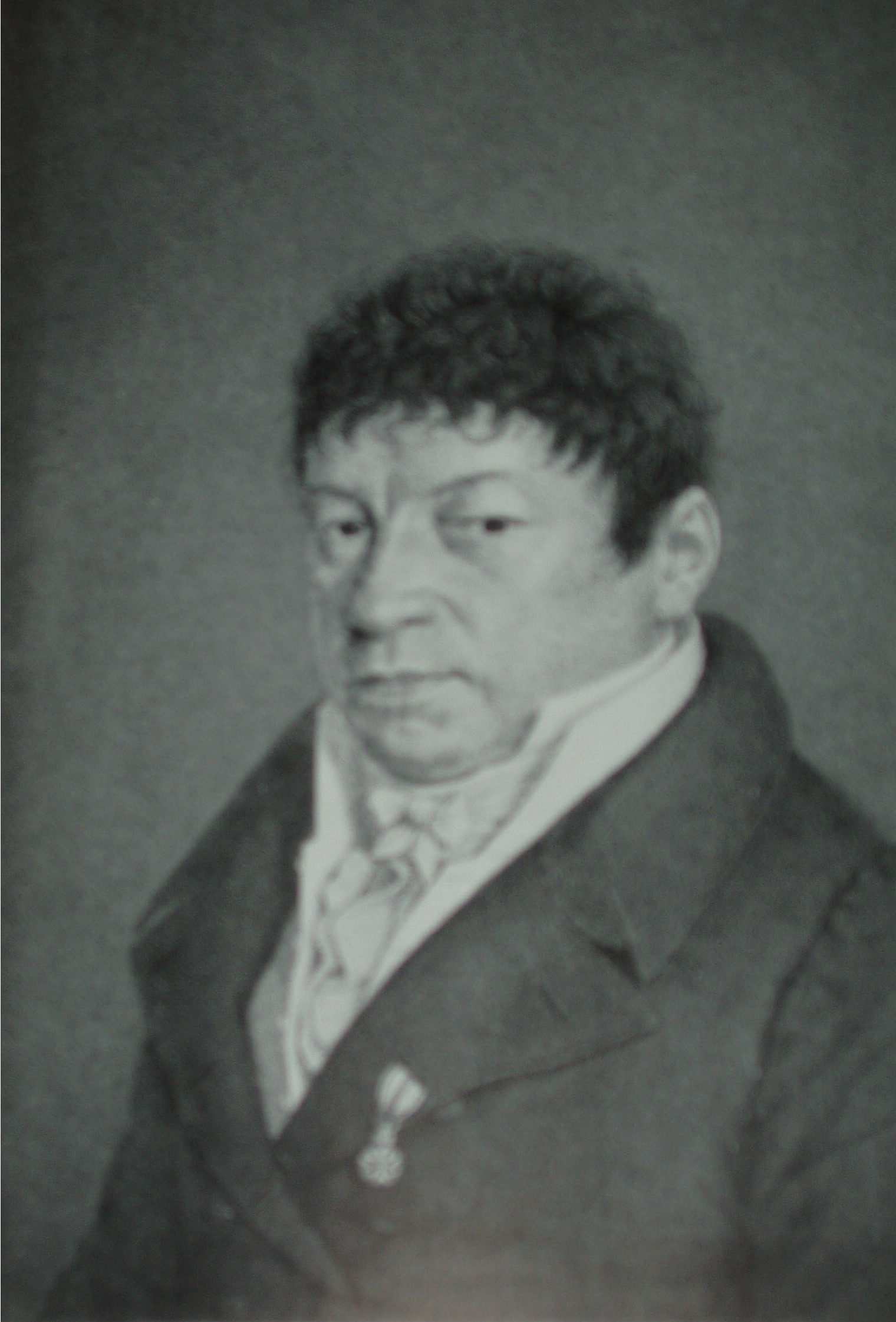
Portrait of Friedrich Schlichtegroll; artist unknown

Adolf Heinrich Friedrich Schlichtegroll (8 December 1765 in Waltershausen – 4 December 1822 in Munich) was a teacher, scholar and the first biographer of Wolfgang Amadeus Mozart. His brief account of Mozart's life (6000 words) was published in a volume of twelve obituaries Schlichtegroll prepared and called Nekrolog auf das Jahr 1791 ("Necrology for the year 1791"). The book appeared in 1793, two years after Mozart's death.

== Sources ==
Schlichtegroll had never met Mozart. To obtain information about him, he consulted a friend of Mozart's in Salzburg, Albert von Mölk, who in turn queried Mozart's sister Maria Anna Mozart ("Nannerl"). Nannerl's written reply to his queries survives. Nannerl also contacted Johann Andreas Schachtner, an old Mozart family friend from the time of Wolfgang's childhood, and he replied with a kindly letter filled with anecdotes and memories, which Nannerl duly forwarded; Schachtner's remarks also survived and can be read today.

Since none of these people was very close to Mozart after 1781 (the year he left Salzburg for Vienna), Schlichtegroll's biography is weighted toward the earlier period (i.e. first 25 years) of Mozart's life.

== Rival biographic traditions ==
Schlichtegroll's biography competed with another early work by Franz Niemetschek, which relied on the testimony of Mozart's widow Constanze. The Schlichtegroll biography is relatively harsh on the role Constanze played in Mozart's life, as might be expected given Nannerl's antipathy to Constanze; for details see Maria Anna Mozart. According to the Grove Dictionary of Music, "Constanze bought up and destroyed the entire edition of the Nekrolog (the publication containing Schlichtegroll's obituary), apparently disliking its portrayal of her."

== Assessment ==
Some modern scholars take a dim view of Schlichtegroll's work. Cliff Eisen and Simon P. Keefe vividly depict him as the first in a long and dubious tradition:

the tradition of depicting Mozart as a strange mixture of angel and beast, Tamino and Papageno: sublime where his music was concerned, but pathetically inadequate in worldly matters.

Bruce Cooper Clarke, who has compiled an extensive web-posted commentary on Schlichtegroll's work, assesses him thus:

The debt posterity owes to Friedrich Schlichtegroll is mixed. On the one hand, because he asked questions not long after Mozart had died and offered the prospect of publication, Mozart's sister and others who were acquainted with the composer were led to put something of their remembrances in writing, reminiscences that otherwise might never have been recorded. On the other hand, through his handling of these materials, Schlichtegroll gave a powerful start to the formation of an "eternal-child" myth that, despite its irrelevance and wrongheadedness, has intruded ever since on every effort of Mozart biography to see its subject whole.
