= Maria Anna Mozart =

Sister of Wolfgang Amadeus Mozart (1751–1829)

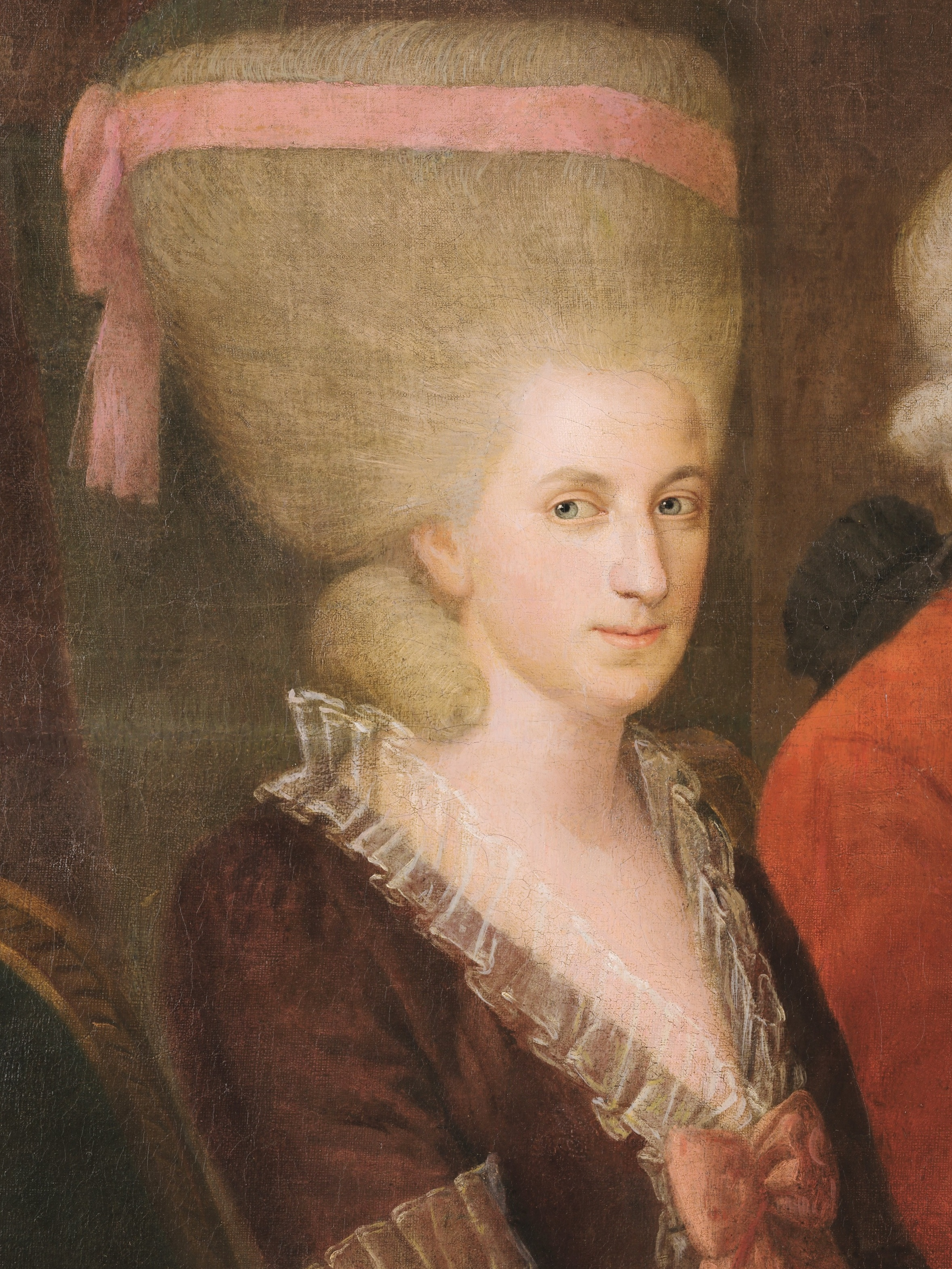
- Detail from Portrait of the Mozart Family, c. 1781
- Born: 30 July 1751; Salzburg
- Died: 29 October 1829 (aged 78); Salzburg
- Occupations: Musician, music teacher
- Spouse: Johann Baptist Franz von Berchtold zu Sonnenburg (m. 1784)
- Children: 3
- Family: Mozart family

Maria Anna Walburga Ignatia "Marianne" Mozart (30 July 1751 – 29 October 1829), also known by her nickname Nannerl, was a distinguished musician from Salzburg. In her childhood, she developed into an outstanding keyboard player under the tutelage of her father Leopold. She became a celebrated child prodigy and went on concert tours through much of Europe with her parents and her younger brother Wolfgang Amadeus Mozart. At age 17, her career as a touring musician came to an end, though she continued to work at home teaching piano and performing on occasion. At age 33 she married, moved to a village six hours by carriage from Salzburg, and there raised her own and her husband's children. On her widowhood in 1801, she returned to Salzburg and resumed teaching and performance. She is known to have composed works of music, though no manuscripts survive. In her later years she contributed to the biographical study of her late brother.

== Life ==
Maria Anna Mozart is known to scholarship from a variety of sources. There are a great number of letters, though virtually all of the surviving ones were written to her or her family, not by her. Particularly for the early years, when she was most famous, there are news reports and other observations, collected and recorded by scholars such as Otto Erich Deutsch. She kept a diary, some of which is preserved, and wrote a brief but informative reminiscence of her brother's childhood. There is very little material to indicate what she thought or felt about the events and people in her life.

=== Childhood and early fame ===
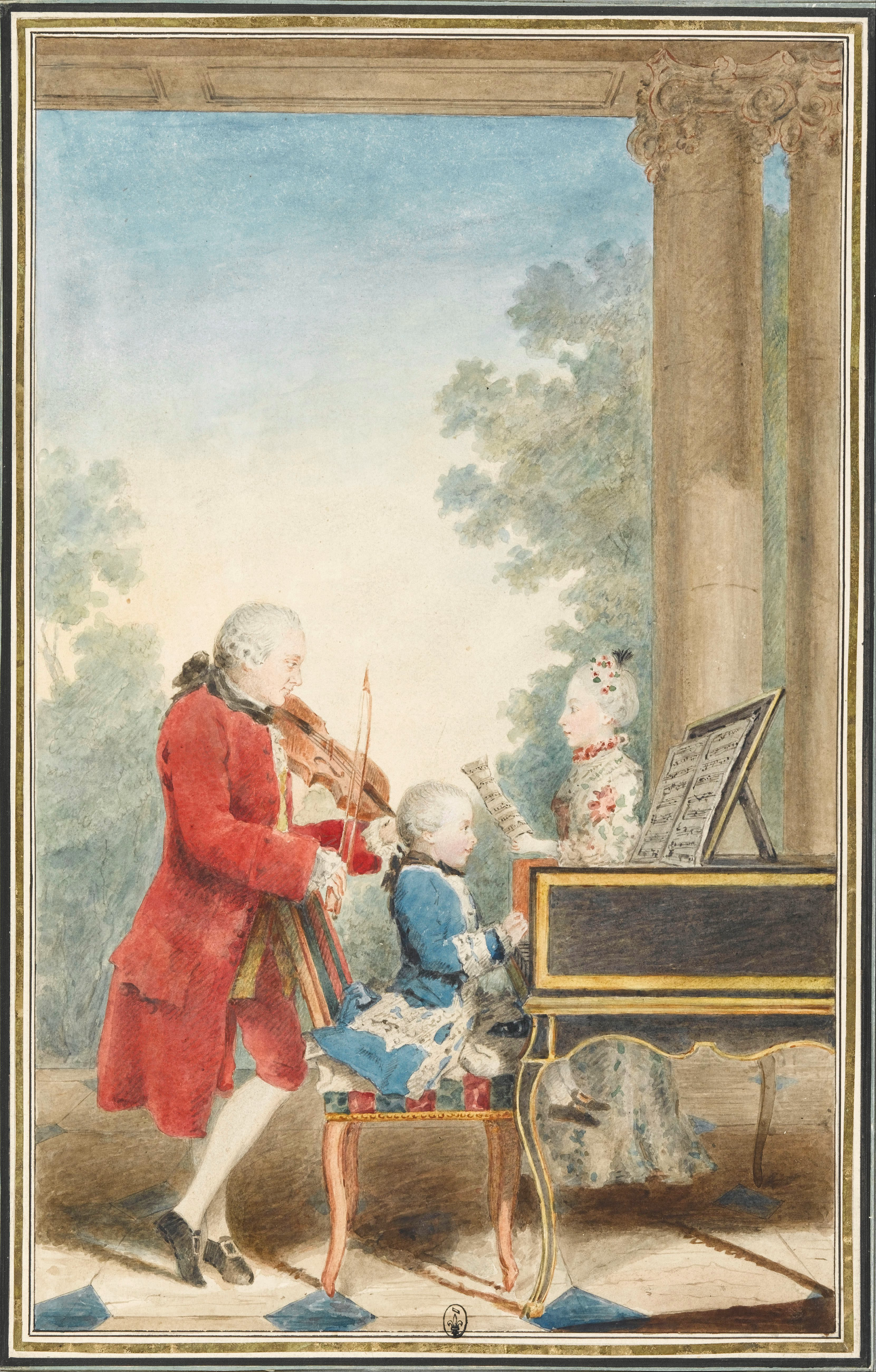
This portrait, by Louis Carrogis, known as "Carmontelle", was painted in Paris during the family grand tour. It shows Leopold with his violin, Wolfgang at the keyboard, and Nannerl (perhaps unusually, since her fame was as a keyboardist) singing.

Maria Anna Mozart was born in Salzburg to Leopold Mozart and Anna Maria Mozart. In childhood, she bore the nickname "Nannerl", a name that is often used for her today; later on her informal first name became "Marianne". When Nannerl was seven years old, her father started teaching her to play the harpsichord. She progressed very rapidly, catching the attention of her little brother Wolfgang, whom Leopold soon started teaching as well. By age 13 Nannerl had reached the point where her father, in a letter (8 June 1764), called her "one of the most skillful pianists in Europe."

As it emerged that both children were musical prodigies, Leopold had the idea of taking them on tour to perform. There were several such journeys: first to Munich (January 1762), then Vienna (18 September 1762 – 5 January 1763), then a three-year grand tour of northwestern Europe (9 June 1763 – 29 November 1766), including long stays in London and Paris. Lastly, there was a second journey to Vienna (11 September 1767 – 5 January 1769), but by this time Nannerl no longer qualified as a prodigy and performed little.

Here are some press notices Nannerl received.

Just imagine a girl 11 years of age who can perform on the harpsichord or the fortepiano (Note: The mention of the early piano in 1763 is strikingly early (all the Paris reviews refer to the older harpsichord), but is understandable in that Augsburg was the headquarters of a pioneering piano builder, Johann Andreas Stein. The Mozarts bought a practice keyboard from Stein during their visit, and in 1777 Stein proved a good friend to Mozart, by then on a job-hunting tour.) the most difficult sonatas and concertos by the greatest masters, most accurately, readily and with an almost incredible ease, in the very best of taste. (from the Intelligenz-Zettel of Augsburg, 19 May 1763)

A Kapellmeister of Salzburg, Mozart by name, has just arrived here with two children who cut the prettiest figure in the world. His daughter, eleven years of age, plays the harpsichord in the most brilliant manner; she performs the longest and most difficult pieces with an astonishing precision. (from Baron Friedrich Melchior Grimm's Correspondance littéraire, 1 December 1763)

His daughter, aged eleven, plays the harpsichord in a distinguished manner; no one could have a more precise and brilliant execution. (Paris Avant-coureur, 5 March 1764) (Note: All three reviews go on to praise Wolfgang, though in different terms – not just for his performances of existing works, but also for improvisation.)

[Again from Baron Grimm, Correspondance littéraire, but covering the second visit to Paris, 1 July 1766] Mlle Mozart, now thirteen years of age, and moreover grown much prettier, has the most beautiful and most brilliant execution on the harpsichord.

All four reviews quoted go on to praise Wolfgang, though in different terms – not just for his performances of existing works, but also for improvisation and composition.

During the family journeys, Nannerl's life was twice in great danger from illness. The first occasion was in the Hague in November 1765, during the Grand Tour: the Mozarts averted their daughter's death by changing doctors at the last minute, with the altered treatment leading to her survival. In her sickbed she babbled in five languages (helping to distract her frightened little brother), and was administered the Roman Catholic sacrament of extreme unction. Afterwards, Nannerl was "nothing but skin and bones", and had to learn to walk again. A second serious illness occurred in November 1767, when the Mozarts visited Vienna during what turned out to be a smallpox epidemic; see Mozart and smallpox. The smallpox was likely contracted in Vienna (it struck both children), but the actual illness took place while the Mozarts were staying in Olomouc, in a vain effort to escape the disease.

=== The end of her performing career ===
Toward the end of the Grand Tour, Leopold pondered and made plans for his children. He sought to prepare Wolfgang for a Kapellmeister position, which would offer a steady and substantial income which would enable him to support the entire family as his parents aged. For Nannerl, however, societal views of the time meant that her opportunities were far more limited. Halliwell writes:

Though Leopold manifestly wanted Nannerl to be capable of earning money from music when she grew up, it was also an assumption of their society that she would marry for financial support.

The only real professional positions open to women were in singing, not Nannerl's forte. Leopold instead sought to prepare her for the profession of piano teaching, with perhaps some performance included as well. This was intended to generate supplementary income, either for the Mozart family or for whatever family she might eventually marry into. Concerning Nannerl's fate, Halliwell writes:

There was now an essential difference between her and Wolfgang which was caused by her sex and not by the fact that his talent was superior. He was thrust forward and had a clear goal to guide him as he worked, while she was forced to adopt a passive attitude, waiting until a man – either Wolfgang or a future husband – could provide the salary and the place of abode which would enable her to practise in the limited way described. At the age of 15, her most dazzling days were behind her.

Wolfgang continued to tour with Leopold (for instance, in three journeys to Italy), while Marianne had to stay at home in Salzburg with her mother.

=== The years at home before her marriage ===
After the final visit to Vienna (1767–1768), Marianne lived at home in Salzburg with whatever family were there at the time, up until her marriage in 1784. The Mozarts led a lively and close family life, with numerous visiting friends and much music-making, both among themselves and with visitors. After 1773, there was more room for this, as the family had moved from the cramped quarters where Nannerl and Wolfgang had been born to the more spacious Tanzmeisterhaus "Dancing master's house", which included a capacious salon originally built for dancing. The family frequently attended the theatre when a company was in town (they befriended Mozart's later collaborator Emanuel Schikaneder when he brought his troupe to Salzburg). Often on Sundays there was Bölzlschiessen (recreational dart shooting), followed by a stroll in the Mirabell Park.

A few events punctuated this long period. The three Italian journeys by Leopold and Wolfgang split the family, with Marianne and her mother staying at home. In 1772, she took on her first piano pupil (see below for her career as teacher). In 1777, the family was split again: Wolfgang departed on a long, ultimately failed job-hunting tour, accompanied by his mother. At this point, Marianne took on a number of duties previously performed by her mother, leading her father to write (to his wife, on 27 October 1777), "I have to tell you that Nannerl is astonishingly diligent, hard-working, and attentive to everything that concerns housekeeping." Indeed, Marianne's mother never returned from the trip, as she died in 1778 while she and Wolfgang were in Paris. In 1779, Wolfgang rejoined the household, back from his failed journey. In 1781, Marianne took the last trip of her life outside the Salzburg area, visiting Munich to attend the premiere of her brother's opera Idomeneo, performed at Carnival time, with a side trip to Augsburg to perform with her brother. For the trip she made a "very extravagant purchase", a dress costing 70 florins. (Note: She needed black mourning wear, since the Empress of Austria, Maria Theresia, had just died. Halliwell (1998), p. 347 discusses the dress, suggesting that she paid for it with her income from teaching. She needed it because she expected to play in public, attend the Carnival balls, and (Halliwell suggests) find a suitable husband.) Wolfgang went directly from Munich to pursue a career in Vienna, and never returned to Salzburg other than a single visit with his new wife Constanze in 1783. Thus, between 1780 and her marriage in 1784, Marianne was Leopold's only family companion at home.

=== As piano teacher and mature pianist ===
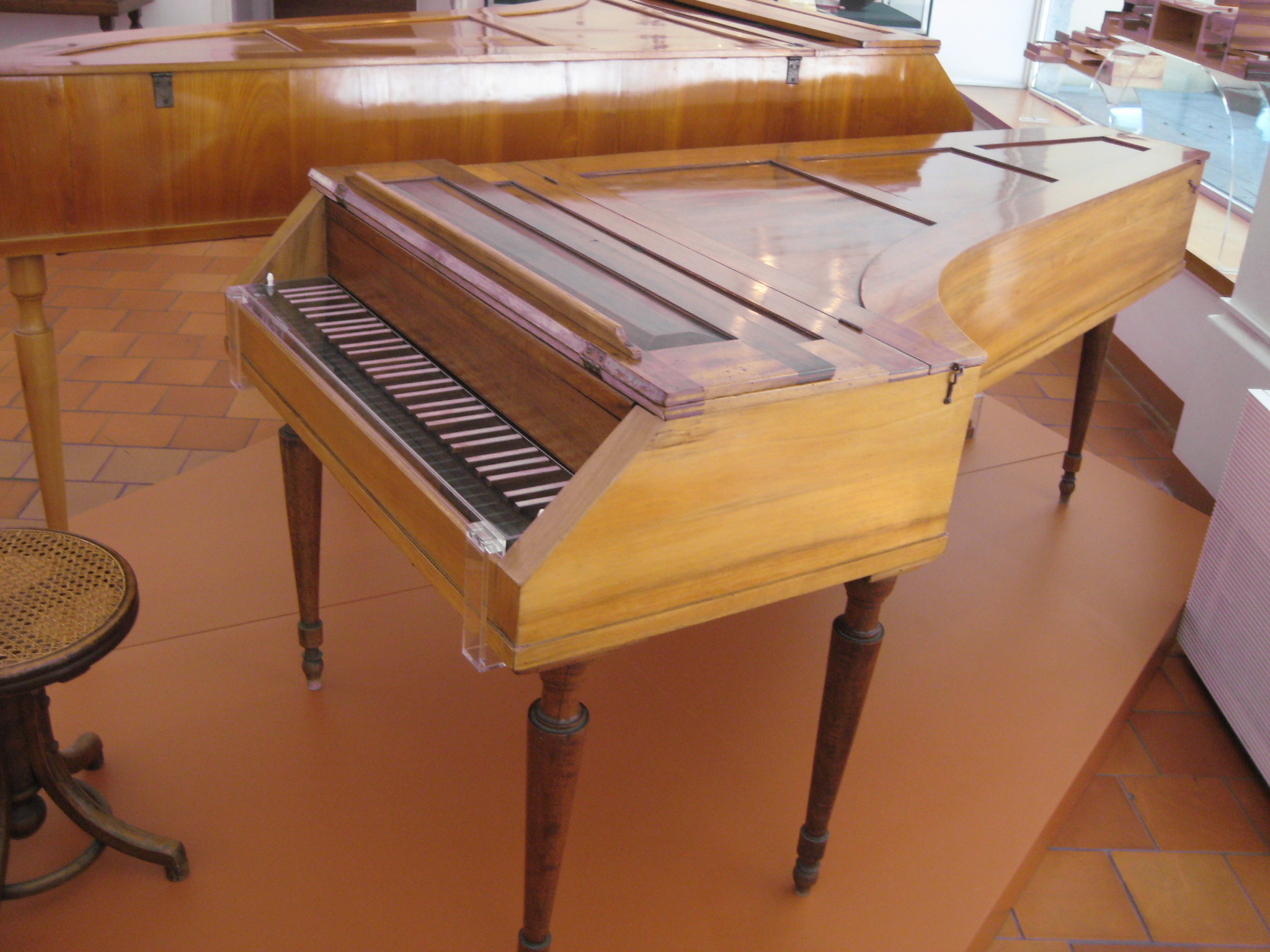
Maria Anna Mozart's piano is not preserved. The maker of her instrument, Johann Evangelist Schmidt, built this instrument (perhaps of heavier construction) 20 years later in 1803.

Marianne had been taught exclusively by Leopold Mozart, who had independent fame for his pedagogy and was the author of a famous violin text. Her career as a part-time piano teacher began in Salzburg in 1772. By the testimony of Albert von Mölk, a family friend, Marianne was herself highly effective as a teacher:

In the last years of her unmarried state, which she spent in the home of her father, she gave lessons in piano playing to several young women of Salzburg; and even to the present, one can single out the students of Nannètte Mozart from all the others by the care, precision, and correct fingering in their playing.

At any one time there was not a great number of students, since each student was taught several times a week, even every day. Her students were mostly female, and were the daughters of the aristocracy (for instance, Count Lodron) and of well-off members of the Salzburg middle class. According to entries in her diary (1783) she was an early teacher of Joseph Wölfl, who continued his studies with Leopold and became a famous virtuoso. Leopold also had two (eventually three) resident pupils, part of whose instruction was Marianne's duty (that this is so is known because immediately on return from Marianne's marriage he returned his students to their home).

During the period between her youthful performing career and her departure from Salzburg, when Leopold was at home, he attended to aspects of Marianne's musical education that had been left as gaps when the goal had been to produce a keyboard virtuoso: realization of figured bass, accompaniment of singers, and transposition. She made rapid progress in these areas, which served her as an asset when she later was invited to become the only female member of an amateur orchestra, organized by the young Count Czernin. She sat at the keyboard in the center of the orchestra, holding the ensemble together (it was shaky, since the members included aristocrats who had overrated themselves as players). The orchestra performed piano concertos, but these were not performed by Marianne, who disapproved of the instrument that was provided. She did, however, coach other young women in their concerto performances.

There were other, occasional opportunities for Marianne to perform in Salzburg. Solomon (1995:575) describes the historical record as follows:

Many of Marianne Mozart's performances in Salzburg have left no trace; among the documented performances are a joint appearance with [Wolfgang] on 15 October 1769; participation in [Wolfgang's] concert in the "Tanzmeistersaal" on 15 August 1777, performances for the visitors Anton Janitsch and Josef Reicha on 25 and 26 January 1778; continuo accompaniment in a concert by Count Czernin's amateur orchestra on 12 April 1778 [see above]; and accompanying [Wolfgang] at a concert at court in early September 1780. ... Her final joint appearance with [Wolfgang] took place in Augsburg in early March 1781.

There may have been other performances; according to Solomon, "in a letter of 24 March 1781 [Wolfgang] suggested that his sister "demand two ducats" each time she performed at court."

=== The visit of Wolfgang and Constanze, 1783 ===
Between July and late October 1783, Wolfgang made what turned out to be his final visit to Salzburg, in the company of his wife Constanze, whom he had married on 4 August of the previous year. The visit may have been a difficult one, for (as the correspondence shows) Leopold Mozart had strongly disapproved of the marriage in advance and gave his permission reluctantly and belatedly. Testimony for how Marianne felt about the marriage is absent, but two letters that Constanze wrote to her have been preserved. Solomon writes, "Prior to the wedding, Constanze had sent affectionate regards to Marianne and asked for her friendship in return":

Without undue pride I may say I partly deserve it and shall endeavor to do so wholly! May I in exchange offer you mine, which, indeed, has long been yours in the secrecy of my heart?

Marianne's reply is not preserved, but the next letter Constanze wrote to her (24 July 1782, Marianne's name day) suggests to Solomon that Constanze's offer of friendship was refused:

Forgive me for ... worrying you again with my scrawl ... And if my good wishes are a nuisance to you, as all congratulations are, my consolation must be that already I am not the only one who is bothering you in this way. All that I deserve is that for the love of God you should suffer me as you do all the others.

As Halliwell (1998) notes, Marianne's diary tells us that the weeks of Wolfgang and Constanze's visit were quite busy, with tourism, visits from friends, and music making. It is uninformative concerning the feelings of the four family members toward each other during this time. Solomon takes the view that the visit was tense and yielded no sense of reconciliation.

=== Her relationship with Franz d'Ippold ===
Around the summer of 1783, Marianne then aged 32, developed a relationship with Franz Armand d'Ippold, who was a 53-year-old civil servant in the Salzburg court who directed a school for aristocratic boys. Why this relationship did not lead to marriage is not known, though some scholars have proposed that it was because Leopold objected. Wolfgang, now living in Vienna, intervened sympathetically by letter, suggesting that the whole family move to Vienna, and that he would make introductions to help d'Ippold establish a career there. These plans did not materialize.

That the marriage to d'Ippold was blocked by Leopold is not a scholarly consensus. D'Ippold was not poor; he was an established civil servant who left the sum of 4325 gulden on his death in 1790. Klein's suggestion is that his position as a director of a boy's boarding school made him ineligible for marriage; this view is endorsed by Neumayr, who further suggests that d'Ippold's marriage may have been outright forbidden by his employer, the Salzburg court. Lastly, d'Ippold evidently remained good friends with Leopold, frequently visiting him in the last years of his life when Leopold was caring for his grandson (see below), and especially during his final illness.

=== Marriage and move to St. Gilgen ===
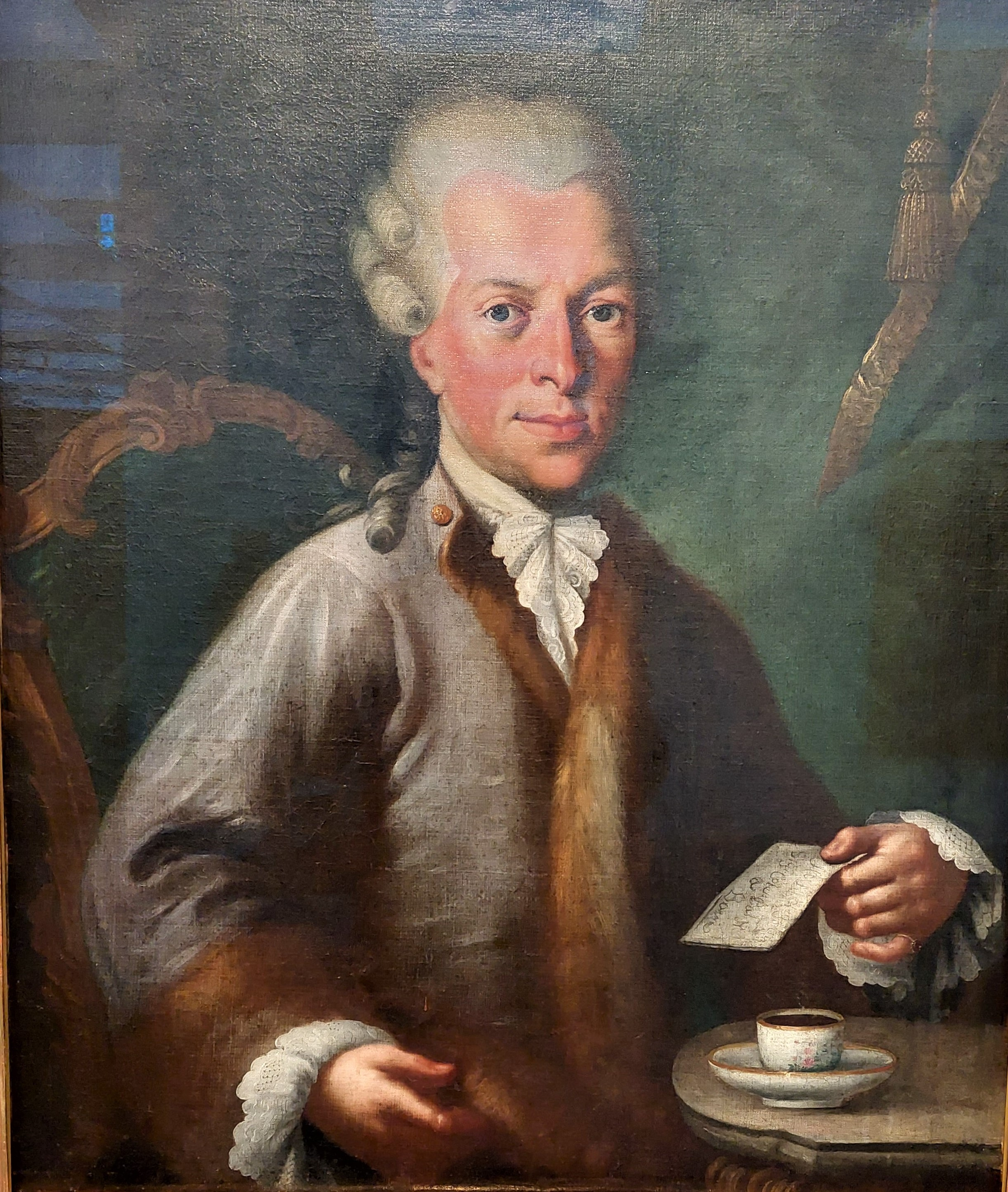
Portrait of Marianne's husband Johann Baptist Franz Freiherr von Berchtold zu Sonnenburg. Unknown artist, third quarter of 18th century, Salzburg Museum

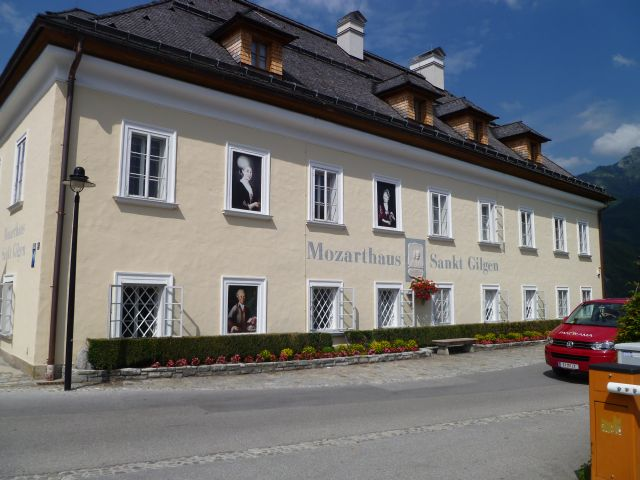
The home where Maria Anna Mozart lived with her family in St. Gilgen is the same house where her mother Anna Maria was born in 1720. Today it is a museum dedicated to their memory.

Eventually, on 23 August 1784 Marianne, aged 33, married a magistrate named Johann Baptist Franz von Berchtold zu Sonnenburg (1736–1801), and settled with him in St. Gilgen, a village in Austria about 29 km east of the Mozart family home in Salzburg. The wedding was attended by Leopold, Katherl Gilowsky, some others, but not Wolfgang.

Berchtold lived in St. Gilgen because his occupation was "Pfleger", i.e. the representative of the Salzburg government in the area; it was a demanding position. This, curiously, had been also the position of Marianne's maternal grandfather Wolfgang Nikolaus Pertl, from 1716 to 1724. The government had built a substantial residence and headquarters for the Pfleger in 1720, and this was the home (where her late mother had spent her first four years) into which Marianne moved on her marriage.

Berchtold was twice a widower and had five children from his two previous marriages, whom Marianne helped raise. She also bore three children of her own: Leopold Alois Pantaleon (1785–1840), Jeanette (1789–1805) and Marie Babette (1790–1791). The marriage may have been a difficult one, in that Berchtold's children were often ill-behaved, even disrespectful, and Berchtold was not always reasonable with her.

It was a disadvantage to Marianne that St. Gilgen was at the time a very remote location. Halliwell (1998) describes the picturesque route that had to be traversed in order for Marianne to be able to play Wolfgang's new concertos in her home.

Wolfgang would send concerto scores to Leopold, who would have the parts copied and send them to Nannerl. The main lines of communication between Salzburg and St Gilgen were a weekly official messenger service, and a more irregular service offered by a woman carrying glassware between the two places. Whichever service was used, Wolfgang's concertos traveled rolled up in a backpack with candles, lard, and anything else ordered by people on the route.

The journey took six hours, irrespective of whether one walked (as the messengers did), or took a carriage on the bad roads.

It appears that Marianne worked tenaciously to retain her standing as a serious pianist in this place of exile, which in one of her letters she called a "wilderness". On her marriage, Leopold, knowing how important the fortepiano was to her, gave her a new instrument as a wedding present, built by the incoming Salzburg court instrument-maker, Johann Evangelist Schmidt. Berchtold allocated a small room of his house/headquarters for her to play in (it had just one window, and included a bed as well as the piano). (Note: Halliwell (1998), p. 454 suggests that for playing with guests the instrument was moved to one of the larger public rooms of the home.) In one of her letters Marianne mentions practicing three hours a day.

The remoteness of St. Gilgen implies that Marianne probably lost some or all of her Salzburg piano pupils. It was also difficult to keep her new fortepiano properly maintained in such a remote location. The damp lakeside location of Marianne's new home, which had caused trouble in her grandfather's time by putting mildew on official documents, was problematic for piano actions. The builder, Johann Evengelist Schmidt, wrote a letter to Leopold giving advice on how he and Marianne could keep the instrument working properly; later, he was persuaded by Leopold to made the six-hour journey with him to St. Gilgen to put the instrument back into order. Despite these obstacles, Marianne persevered in her efforts, managing to play, probably in very small ensembles, her brother's new concertos.

Throughout the early years of her marriage Marianne conducted an extensive correspondence with Leopold, who until his death on 28 May 1787 attempted to provide whatever help he could from a distance, running errands and reporting news. In light of the closeness of their attachment Halliwell writes, "There is every reason to believe that Leopold's death was devastating to Nannerl."

In 1792, her husband was elevated to the nobility as a Freiherr, making Marianne a baroness. Her married surname acquired the honorific preposition "von": von Berchtold zu Sonnenberg.

=== Maria Anna's son ===
An unusual episode in Marianne's life occurred when she gave birth on 27 July 1785 to her first child, a son who was named Leopold after his grandfather. She had traveled from her home in St. Gilgen to Salzburg for the birth. When she returned to St. Gilgen, she left her infant in the care of her father and his servants. The elder Leopold stated (by a letter that preceded Marianne back to St. Gilgen) that he would prefer to raise the child for the first few months himself. In 1786, he extended the arrangement to an indefinite term. There is no record of Marianne's response to this arrangement. Leopold continued to care for his grandson, taking delight in his progress (toilet training, speech, and so on), and commencing with the very beginnings of musical training. Marianne saw her son on occasional visits, but in general, was not involved in his care. The arrangement continued until the death of her father in 1787.

Biographers differ on the reasons for this arrangement. Little Leopold was ill in his infancy, and perhaps needed to be kept in Salzburg for this reason, but the arrangement for his care was actually made before he fell ill. Other possibilities attribute the arrangement to Marianne's (putatively) delicate health or her obligation to take care of her stepchildren. Biographer Maynard Solomon attributes the arrangement to Leopold's wish to revive his skills in training a musical genius, as he had done with Marianne's brother. He also suggests that giving up her son was indicative of her total subordination to her father's wishes. Halliwell suggests instead that Leopold was being supportive of his daughter, in that the presence of unruly stepchildren made the Berchtold household an unsuitable environment for raising the child.

=== Relationship with Wolfgang ===
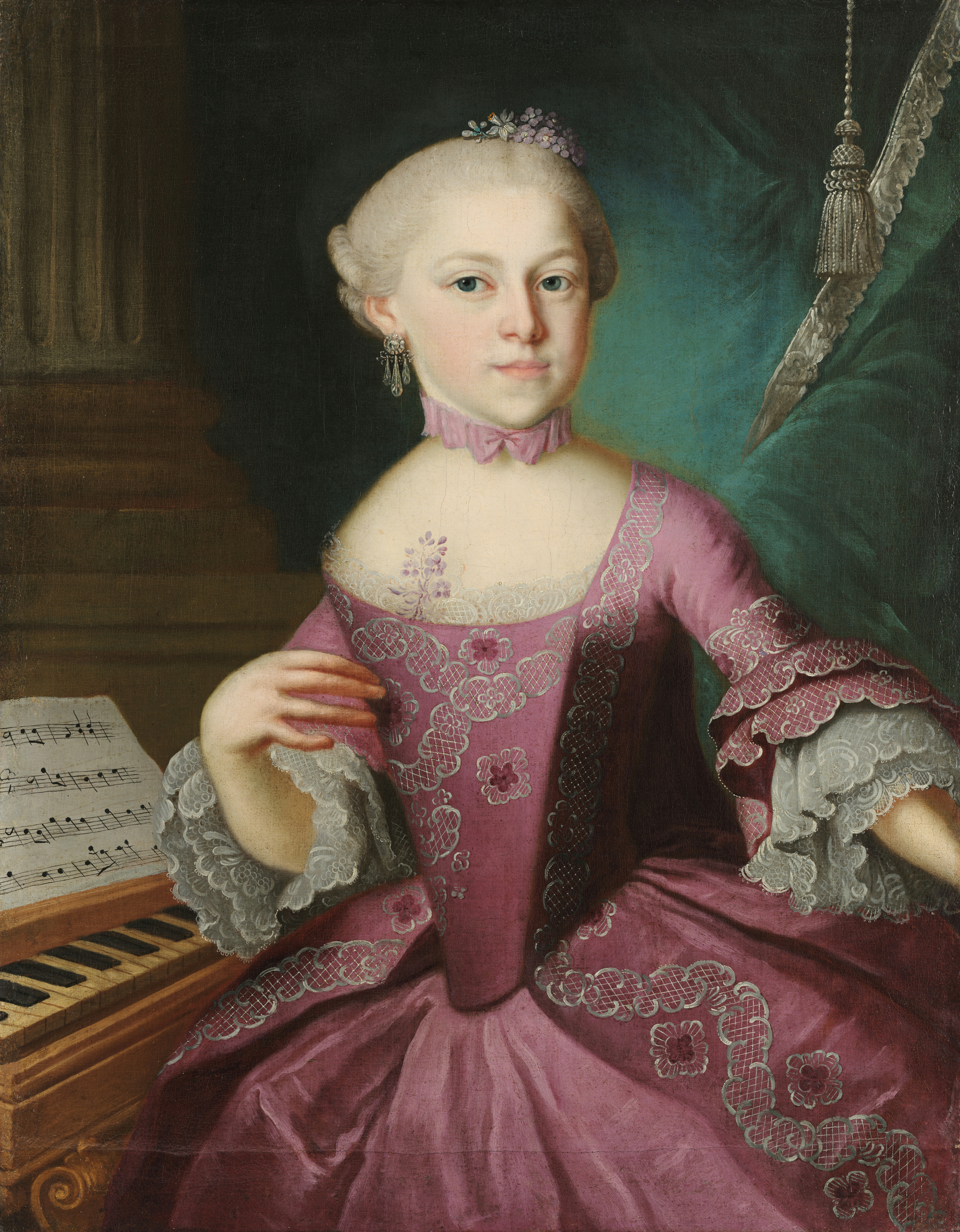
Portrait of Maria Anna Mozart near the onset of her childhood fame in 1763, attributed to Lorenzoni

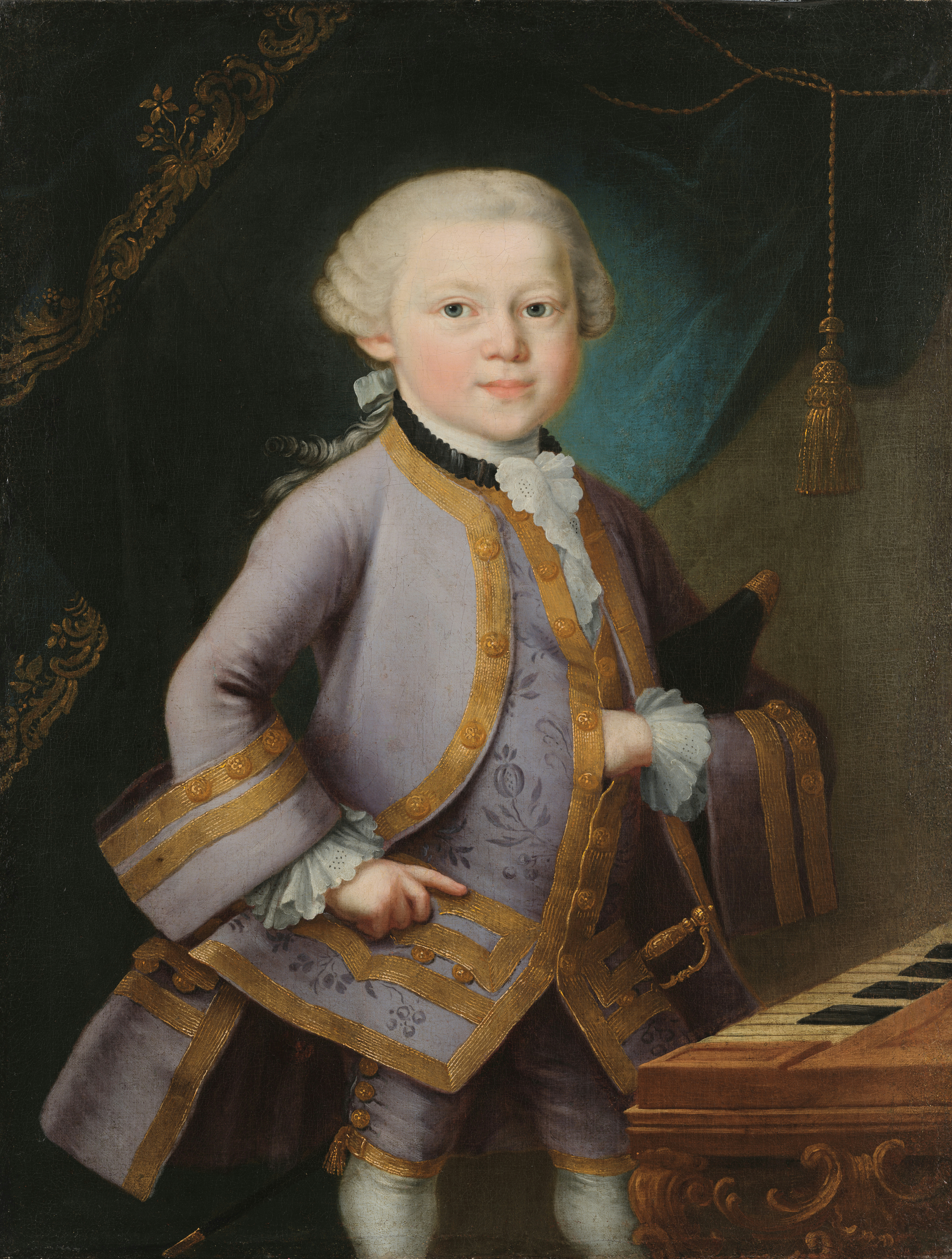
The parallel portrait of Wolfgang, from the same time and painter

During their childhood, the four and a half years older Marianne was her brother's idol. According to Solomon, "at three, Mozart was inspired to study music by observing his father's instruction of Marianne; he wanted to be like her." The two children were very close, and they invented a secret language and an imaginary "Kingdom of Back" of which they were king and queen. By the time Wolfgang was a teenager, traveling in Italy, there is often correspondence between the two. Wolfgang's contributions, often added on to Leopold's letters, are affectionate, frequently teasing; they included some of the scatological and sexual wordplay in which he indulged with intimates. The friendly letters from Wolfgang continued into full adulthood; for instance, in 1784, just before her marriage, Wolfgang teases her about the forthcoming loss of her virginity.

After his departure for Vienna, her brother sent her works he had composed, so Marianne could perform them at home; these included for example the Prelude and Fugue in C, K. 394 (1782) and the four Preludes K. 395/300g (1777). Until 1785, Marianne also received copies from Wolfgang of his piano concertos (up to No. 21) in St. Gilgen. In sending the copies, Wolfgang took the trouble to write down the cadenzas for these works that, performing them himself, he would have played from memory or improvisation; the copies Marianne preserved made it possible for pianists to perform the Mozart cadenzas in later years.

However, a widely noted fact about the relationship between the two siblings is that the last letter from Wolfgang to Marianne is dated 1788, fully three years before his death, leading some scholars, e.g. Solomon, to infer that there was a falling out. Otto Jahn likewise judged that the two siblings may have severed their relationship, and suggested various reasons: (Note: Jahn's biographical essay on Marianne Mozart appears as an appendix to Abert (2007).) that Wolfgang had essentially abandoned his family when he moved off to Vienna, that she did not care for his wife Constanze, and perhaps some friction over the disposal of Leopold's estate in 1787. (Note: Rieger (1990) expresses skepticism about the estate as a source of trouble: "It has falsely been assumed that Nannerl quarrelled with her brother about their father's legacy; however, as a woman she had no legal power, and the negotiations were conducted by her husband.") Solomon notes that after Wolfgang's visit to Salzburg with Constanze in 1783, the two siblings never visited again and thus never saw each other's children.

Scenarios for what caused the cessation of contact vary tremendously. Solomon (1995) portrays a ferocious, traumatizing quarrel over the will, a view held to be unrealistic by Halliwell (1998). Halliwell notes that Mozart had never corresponded much with Marianne specifically; that is, they learned news of each other through their respective correspondence with Leopold. Mozart's last letter, from 2 August 1788, is cordial, (Note: To be sure, it begins "You have every right to be angry with me!" but it was accompanied by an act of kindness; with the letter Mozart shipped copies of his newest piano pieces, as he had done in Leopold's lifetime. The letter is given in English translation in Spaethling (2000), p. 401.) but during this time he repeatedly told Marianne that he was too busy to write. In 1792, a year after Wolfgang's death, Marianne wrote to the obituarist Friedrich Schlichtegroll, who among other questions had asked her what languages Mozart had liked to use for writing and speaking: "Because he wasn't at all a lover of writing, I received no more letters from him after 1788, so I cannot say which language he enjoyed writing and which language he enjoyed speaking."

Ten years after the death of Wolfgang in 1791, Marianne encountered Franz Xaver Niemetschek's 1798 biography of her brother. Since this biography had been written from the perspective of Vienna and of Constanze, she only then read about certain parts of his life for the first time. In an 1800 letter, she wrote:

Herr Prof. Niemetschek's biography so completely reanimated my sisterly feelings toward my so ardently beloved brother that I was often dissolved in tears since it is only now that I became acquainted with the sad condition in which my brother found himself.

=== Musical works ===
Letters written by Wolfgang to his sister show that Marianne composed works of music. In one of the letters, he wrote, "My dear sister! I am in awe that you can compose so well, in a word, the song you wrote is beautiful." The letters are the sole evidence for her status as a composer because no manuscripts of her work have survived. In the voluminous correspondence of her father, they are not mentioned.

=== Later years ===
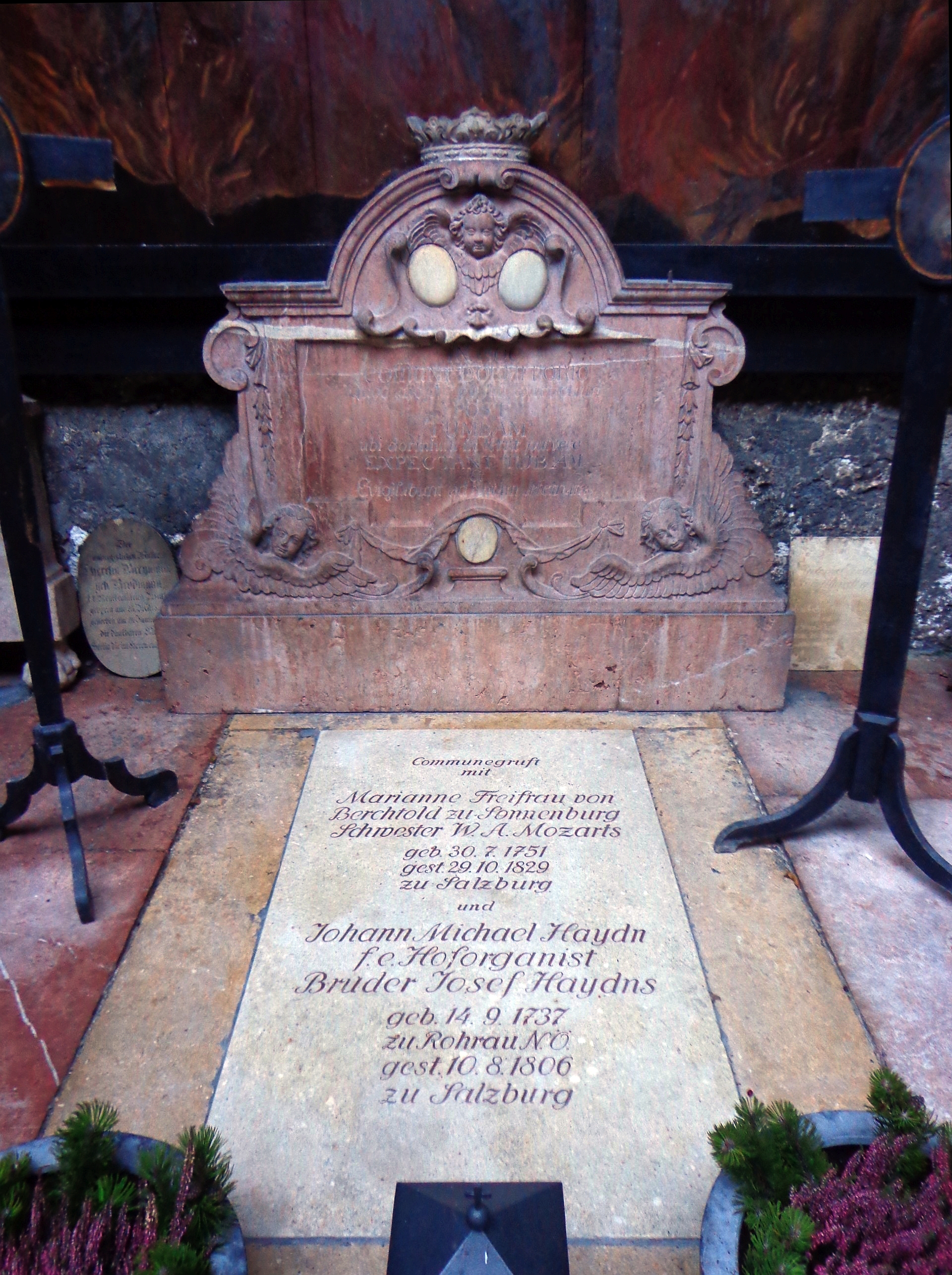
Crypt 54 (St Peter's Cemetery, Salzburg): communal vault in which Maria Anna Mozart and Michael Haydn are buried

After the death of her husband in 1801, Marianne returned to Salzburg, at first accompanied by her two living children. Financially well provided for, she nevertheless resumed teaching in Salzburg. Her students during this time included Anna Sick, who later became the court pianist at Stuttgart.

She also took the opportunity to resume, in Salzburg, her solo career; notably in concerts at Prince Ernst von Schwarzenberg's. More than a third of century after her career as prodigy had ended, positive press reviews again appeared; the following quotation is from Friedrich von Spaur:

Among the best musical talents who grace the city of Salzburg is Mozart's sister, the widow von Sonnenburg, who already in her youth reaped applause and admiration of all music experts when she traveled with her father and brother.

Marianne was visited by Wolfgang's son, Franz Xaver Mozart, whom she had never met and who then lived in Lemberg (now Lviv). She took the opportunity to tell him about his father's childhood, and to introduce him to various family friends.

In her last years, Marianne's health declined, and she became blind in 1825. Mary Novello, visiting in 1829, recorded her impression that Marianne was "blind, languid, exhausted, feeble and nearly speechless", as well as lonely. She mistakenly took Marianne to be impoverished, though in fact she was frugal and left a large fortune (7,837 florins).

Marianne died on 29 October 1829, aged 78, and was buried in St Peter's Cemetery, Salzburg.

== Personality, character, and appearance ==
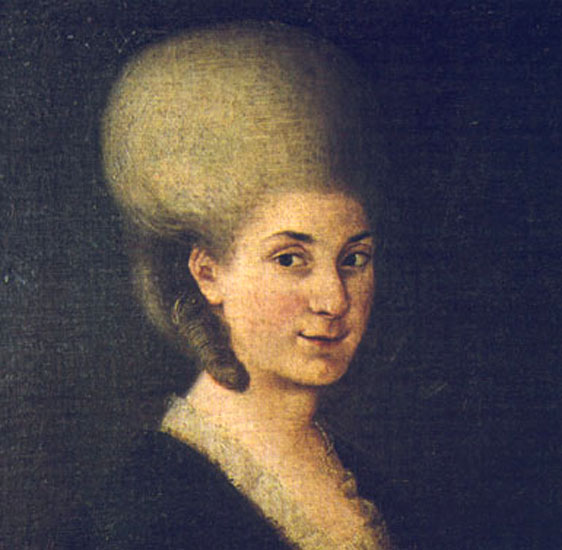
Portrait traditionally regarded as being Maria Anna Mozart in adulthood, c. 1785; for its doubtful status see and discussion below.

The feminist musicologist Eva Rieger writes in the New Grove:

[Marianne] obviously adopted the prescriptive and pedagogical literature of the late Enlightenment and lived as the epitome of contemporary ideas of femininity (piety, self-sacrifice, propriety, modesty).

Some possible examples of "self-sacrifice" are mentioned above: the abandonment of her career as a performing musician, the giving up of the chance to marry the man of her choice, the marrying of a different and probably unsuitable man (that this marriage was not voluntary is suggested by Rieger), and her inability to take up Wolfgang's suggestion that she move to Vienna and pursue professional opportunities there. Maynard Solomon suggests, in his Mozart biography, that all such self-sacrifices were made under the overwhelming and unresisted influence of her father Leopold.

Some examples of piety: Halliwell reports that at least during the period around 1779–1780, Marianne attended church "almost every day", rising early to attend the seven o'clock Mass. Halliwell narrates an episode in her religious experience:

On Good Friday 1779 she and her friend Katherl Gilowsky embarked on a pious round of visits to sixteen different churches to mark the occasion. Beginning at eight in the morning at the cathedral, they kept it up all day with a mid-morning and a lunch break. They climbed the 28 steps of the Heilige Stiege (holy stairway) at the Kajetanerkirche) (church of Saint Cajetan) on their knees; the day was concluded by a visit to Holy Trinity to hear the special music for Good Friday.

To emphasize self-sacrifice and piety is not to say that Marianne's life was devoid of joy. Rieger notes that she was "an avid reader and theatre-goer"; she had good friends in Salzburg (Katherl Gilowsky in particular appears in the records repeatedly), and she participated fully in a rich family life. Halliwell notes that Marianne and her brother "shared a passion for making music", often together during travel or when he was at home in Salzburg.

Marianne was beautiful, according to the testimony of her Salzburg contemporary Albert von Mölk, who in 1792 commented on the physical appearance of her whole family:

In their time the two Mozart parents were the handsomest married couple in Salzburg; in her younger years the daughter also was regarded as a regular beauty. But the son Wolfgang was small, frail, pale in complexion, and completely lacking in all pretensions of face and form. (Note: Mölk was responding to a request from Friedrich Schlichtegroll for biographical information about Mozart; text with translation from Clarke (1995).)

See also Baron Grimm's 1766 review, quoted above.

Both Solomon and Halliwell suggest that it was often Marianne's misfortune to fall physically ill in reaction to harsh life events. The index entry Illness: reaction to unhappiness in Halliwell (1998) gives references to the departure of her mother and brother from Salzburg in 1777, the death of her mother in 1778 and of her father in 1787, the collapse of her marriage plans to d'Ippold in 1781, and the death of her husband in 1801.

She kept a diary, which (per Halliwell) "[illustrates] many aspects of [her] Salzburg life, from her piety to the family's tireless socializing."

== Her role in Mozart biography ==
Marianne served posterity in providing much useful information to biographers of her celebrated brother. Not long after her brother's death in 1791, she was consulted by Friedrich Schlichtegroll, who created the first biography of Mozart. She responded by writing an essay of several pages; she also persuaded Johann Andreas Schachtner, a court trumpeter and old family friend, to write down his own memories. These documents, covering Wolfgang's years of childhood, offer information that would never otherwise have been obtainable. (Note: Scholarship was eventually able to reverse an injustice to her: the intermediary through whom Marianne corresponded with Schlichtegroll, Albert von Mölk, had silently added material to her essay, criticizing Constanze Mozart as not being a 'fitting girl' for her brother. The difference in handwriting was detected by Rieger (1990).) She also helped ensure the survival of the Mozart oeuvre by tracking down missing works on behalf of publishers.

Much later, in 1820, Marianne's former sister-in-law Constanze Nissen, whose first marriage had been to Wolfgang, settled in Salzburg in the company of her second husband, Georg Nikolaus Nissen. The two had the intention to write a comprehensive biography of Mozart. Although Marianne and Constanze had never been close and had not kept in touch, Marianne nevertheless shared with the pair her extensive collection of Mozart letters and memorabilia, which formed an important part of the finished biography and indeed of all subsequent Mozart scholarship.

== Iconography ==
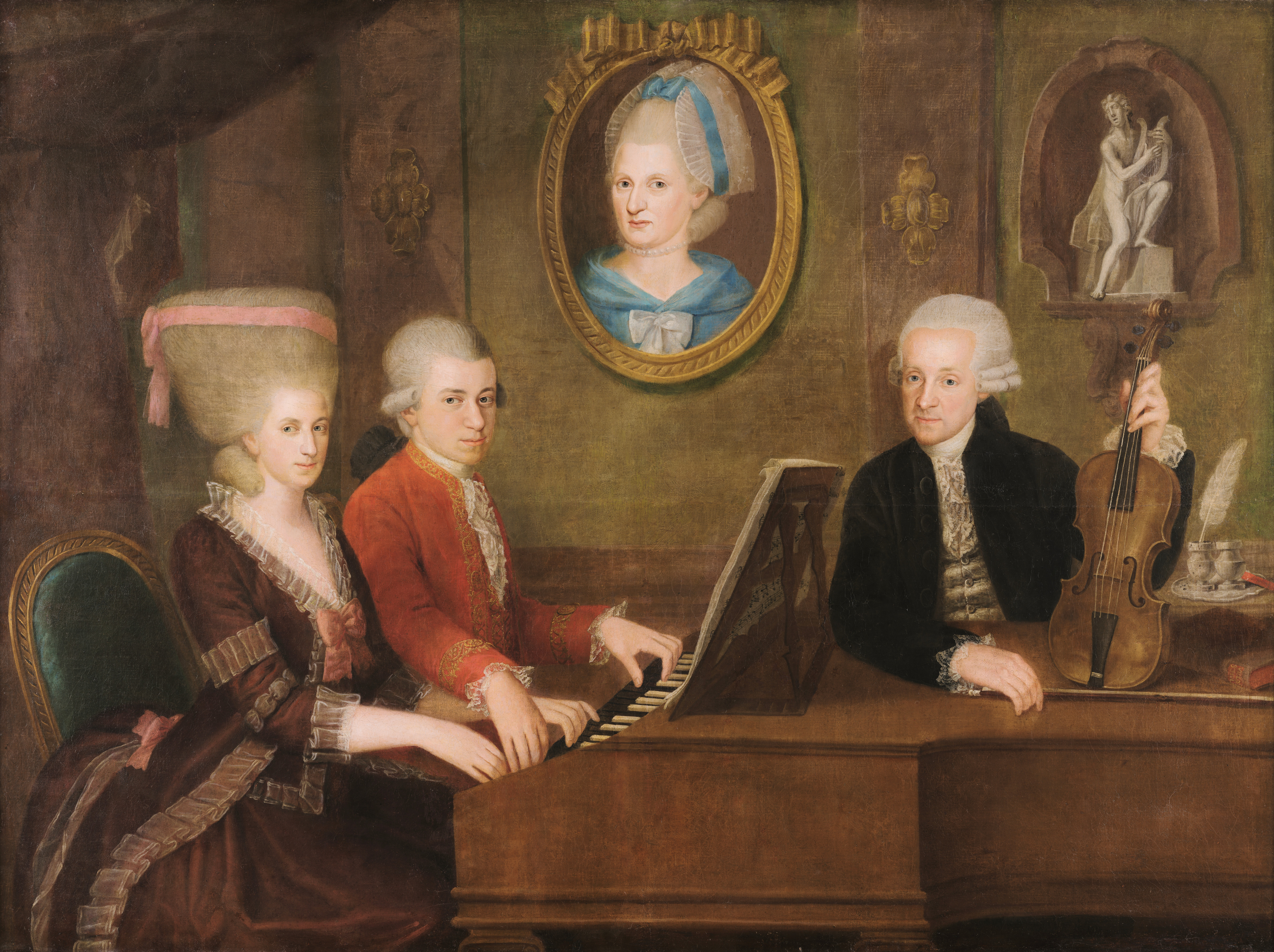
Portrait of the Mozart Family, c. 1781, attributed to Johann Nepomuk della Croce. For detail of Marianne from this work, see "infobox" at the start of this article.

An extensive investigation by Christoph Großpietsch assessed the authenticity of the great many portraits claimed to be of Marianne Mozart, concluding that in fact only three can be considered authentic. These are the Lorenzoni portrait and the trio-portrait by Carmontelle, both shown above, and the family portrait of the Mozarts attributed to della Croce, c. 1780, shown to the right. (In it, Wolfgang and Marianne are playing four-hands, Leopold holds his violin, and the deceased mother Anna Maria looks down from her portrait.) Of the others, Hilscher writes, "Just as with pictures attributed to Wolfgang Amadé, the wish was often the father to the thought, so that despite their ill-suited appearance and questionable provenance, many other pictures were declared to be of Maria Anna."

== In literature and on screen ==
=== As a fictional character ===
Marianne Mozart has provided the inspiration for many authors' fictional characters. Readers are cautioned to enjoy such works without trying to extract facts from them; Hilscher's words "the wish is father to the thought" are widely applicable in this literature. The list below are some of the fictional works featuring Marianne Mozart:

- The Secret Wish of Nannerl Mozart (1996) is a young adult novel by Barbara Kathleen Nickel
- Mozart's Sister (2005) novel by Alison Bauld, follows Marianne's life through marriage, children, widowhood, and death in conversations with her nephew Franz Xaver.
- La sorella di Mozart (Italian: "Mozart's sister") (2006) is a novel by Rita Charbonnier,
- Nancy Moser's historical fiction novel titled Mozart's Sister, published in 2006, has Nannerl narrating her own story from her childhood touring with Wolfgang to her eventual marriage later in life.
- Mary Ann and Miss Mozart (2007) is a young adult novel by Ann Turnbull (refers to Maria Anna Mozart).
- In Mozart's Shadow: His Sister's Story (2008) is a novel by Carolyn Meyer. She wrote of Nannerl's life.
- Nannerl, la sœur de Mozart (French:Mozart's Sister) is a 2010 French-language film from director René Féret.
- Mozart's Last Aria (2011), a novel by Matt Rees has Marianne investigating her brother's death.
- The 2014-2018 Amazon series Mozart in the Jungle has the character of Nannerl in two episodes.
- The Kingdom of Back (2020), a young adult historical fantasy novel by Marie Lu, has Maria Anna as the protagonist.
- The Dark Refrain: A Mystwick School Novel (2024) is a young adult fantasy novel by Jessica Khoury in which a child Maria Anna Mozart features prominently.
- The German TV series Mozart/Mozart, released in December 2025 by ARD, features Maria Anna Mozart as the protagonist.

=== Documentary films ===
- Mozart's Sister (2024) by Madeleine Hetherton-Miau and Rebecca Barry investigates the role of Maria Anna in relation to her brother.

== Notes and references ==
=== Sources ===
Biographical publications

- "Mozart family". Grove Music Online (8th ed.). Oxford University Press. 2001. doi:10.1093/gmo/9781561592630.article.40258. ISBN 978-1-56159-263-0. (subscription, Wikilibrary access, or UK public library membership required). The article is written i.a. by Eva Rieger, the author of a much longer work cited below.
- Abert, Hermann (2007). Cliff Eisen (ed.). W. A. Mozart. Translated by Spencer, Stewart. New Haven: Yale University Press. ISBN 978-0-300-07223-5. OCLC 70401564. A massive standard biography of the composer, mostly neglecting Nannerl, but including an appendix about her by Otto Jahn.
- Clarke, Bruce Cooper (1995). "Albert von Mölk: Mozart Myth-Maker? – Study of an 18th Century Correspondence" (PDF). Mozart-Jahrbuch ... des Zentralinstitutes für Mozartforschung der Internationalen Stiftung Mozarteum Salzburg. pp. 155–191. Careful dissection of how Albert von Mölk added unauthorized material to Marianne's narrative of her dead brother; an intervention detected only two centuries later.
- Clive, Peter (1993). Mozart and His Circle. New Haven: Yale University Press. Brief sketches of many contemporaries of Mozart, many of whom were also part of Nannerl's circle.
- Deutsch, Otto Erich (1965). Mozart: A Documentary Biography. Stanford: Stanford University Press. ISBN 0-8047-0233-0. OCLC 8991008. A widely used reference, containing hundreds of documents (many mentioning Nannerl), knit together by brief narrative passages.
- Glover, Jane (2013) [2005]. Mozart's Women: His Family, His Friends, His Music. Pan Macmillan. ISBN 9780330470506. 1st edition at the Internet Archive
- Halliwell, Ruth (1998). The Mozart Family: Four Lives in a Social Context. Oxford: Clarendon Press. ISBN 978-0-19-816371-8 – via Internet Archive.. This work is unique in focusing on Mozart's family and times rather than just the composer himself. It offers extensive coverage of Maria Anna Mozart's life.
- Halliwell, Ruth (2006). "Mozart, Maria Anna ('Nannerl')". In Cliff Eisen; Simon Keefe (eds.). The Cambridge Mozart Encyclopedia. Cambridge: Cambridge University Press.. A brief article based on the far more extensive 1998 study.
- Hilscher, Elisabeth (5 November 2020). "Wolfgang's 'Angels': Two New Publications on Maria Anna von Berchtold zu Sonnenburg (née Mozart) and Constanze Nissen (Widowed Mozart)". Musicologica Austriaca: Journal for Austrian Music Studies.
- Klein, Herbert (1958). "Zur Herkunft Franz Armand d'Ippolds" [On the origins of Franz Armand d'Ippold] (PDF). Mitteilungen der Internationalen Stiftung Mozarteum (in German).
- Neumayr, Eva (2023). "Maria Anna Mozart: A Re-evaluation of Her Image" (PDF). Journal of the International Alliance for Women in Music. 29 (2–3): 16–20. ISSN 2993-8325.
- Rieger, Eva (1990). Nannerl Mozart: Leben einer Künstlerin im 18. Jahrhundert (in German). Frankfurt: Insel Verlag. ISBN 9783458161134.
- Solomon, Maynard (1995). Mozart: A Life. New York: HarperCollins. ISBN 0-06-019046-9. OCLC 31435799.As was the author's practice in general, there is much psychologizing, including about the relationship of Nannerl and her father.
- Spaethling, Robert (2000). Mozart's Letters, Mozart's Life. Most of the letters are addressed to Marianne along with a parent; there are also a few letters bearing on Leopold's death, the dealing with Leopold's estate, and the petering out of their correspondence. The often-vivid translation imitates Mozart's own German diction.

Works of fiction with Maria Anna Mozart as a main character

- Bauld, Alison (2005). Mozart's Sister. London: Alcina Press. ISBN 978-0-9550713-0-0. OCLC 64769121. Bauld has also published a fictional diary as Nannerl Mozart in the form of Nannerls' blog.
- Charbonnier, Rita [in Italian] (2007). Mozart's Sister: A Novel. Ann Goldstein (trans.). New York: Crown Publishing Group. ISBN 978-0-307-34678-0. OCLC 132585106. Originally published in Italy as: Charbonnier, Rita (2006). La sorella di Mozart: romanzo (in Italian). Milan: Corbaccio. ISBN 978-88-7972-759-4. OCLC 64219881.
- Lu, Marie (2020). The Kingdom of Back. New York: G. P. Putnam's Sons. ISBN 978-1524739010. OCLC 1141426794.
- Meyer, Carolyn (2008). In Mozart's Shadow: His Sister's Story. Houghton Mifflin Harcourt. ISBN 978-0-15-205594-3. OCLC 180689946.
- Rees, Matt (2011). Mozart's Last Aria. New York: Harper Perennial. ISBN 978-0-06-201586-0. OCLC 703206599.
