= Eugenie Schumann =

German pianist (1851–1938)

Eugenie Schumann (1 December 1851 – 25 September 1938) was a German pianist and author.

== Biography ==
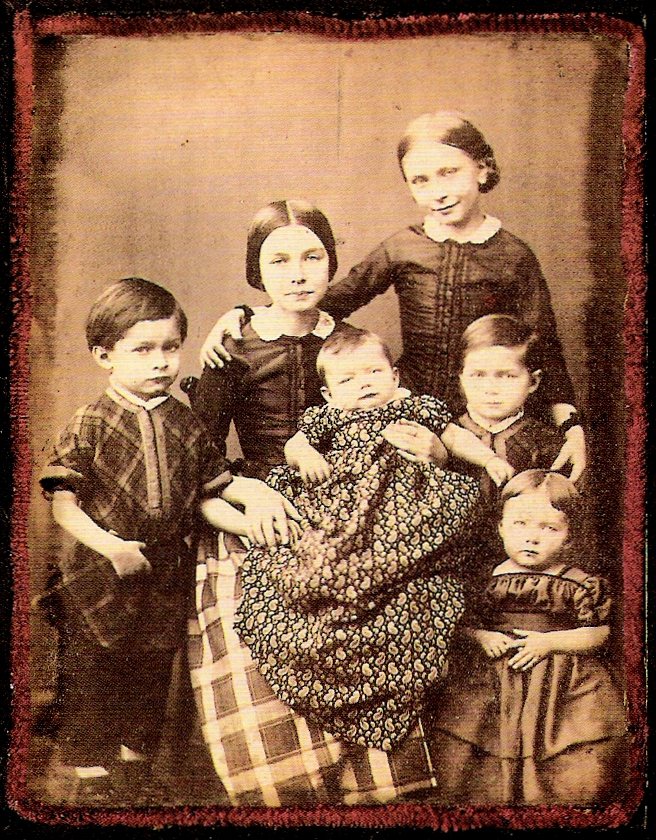
The children of the Schumanns in 1854. From left: Ludwig, Marie, Felix, Elise, Ferdinand and Eugenie.

Eugenie Schumann was born 1 December 1851 in Düsseldorf. She was one of eight children and the youngest daughter of Robert and Clara Schumann. Eugenie studied piano with her mother and with Ernst Rudorff in Berlin. During all of her artistic life, she stood in the shadow of her mother.

Schumann had a romantic relationship with the singer Marie Fillunger, called "Fillu", who lived with the Schumanns for a long time after 1878. In 1888, Schumann ended the relationship, and in January 1889, Fillunger left the Schumanns' home. Both, however, continued to correspond intensively afterwards.

In October 1892, Schumann moved to England and worked there as a piano teacher. In 1918, she left England to support her aged sister, Marie, who had lived in Interlaken, Switzerland, since 1897. In 1925, Schumann published her autobiography, Erinnerungen (Memories), and in 1931, a much-noted biography of her family, titled Robert Schumann after her father, which was translated into several languages. This second book was dedicated to her sister Marie, who had died in 1929, and her lover Marie Fillunger, who had died a year later.

Schumann died 25 September 1938 in Bern, Switzerland. She was buried next to Marie Fillunger at the Gsteig cemetery in Wilderswil near Interlaken.

== Publications ==
- Erinnerungen, Stuttgart: J. Engelhorns Nachfahren, 1925 – New edition with poems by Felix Schumann as: Claras Kinder, Cologne: Dittrich, 1995, ISBN 3-920862-05-8
- Robert Schumann. Ein Lebensbild meines Vaters, Leipzig: Koehler & Amelang, 1931
- Clara Schumann im Briefwechsel mit Eugenie Schumann, Vol. 1: 1857–1888, edited by Christina Siegfried (Schumann-Briefedition, Series I, Vol. 8), Cologne: Dohr 2013
