= Feministische Studien =

- Discipline: Women's studies
- Language: English, German
- Edited by: Rita Casale, Claudia Gather, Sabine Hark, Friederike Kuster, Regine Othmer, Tanja Thomas, Ulla Wischermann

Publication details
- History: 1982–present
- Publisher: Lucius & Lucius Verlagsgesellschaft (Germany)
- Frequency: Biannually
- Impact factor: 0.077 (2015)

Standard abbreviations
- ISO 4: Fem. Stud. (Stuttgart)

Indexing
- ISSN: 0723-5186
- LCCN: 83647896
- OCLC no.: 260159502

Links
- Journal homepage; Online archive

Feministische Studien (Feminist Studies) is a biannual peer-reviewed academic journal, published since 1982. It features articles written in German and English, covering on women's studies. It is published by the Lucius & Lucius Verlagsgesellschaft and the editors-in-chief are Rita Casale, Claudia Gather, Sabine Hark, Friederike Kuster, Regine Othmer, Tanja Thomas, and Ulla Wischermann.

== Abstracting and indexing ==
The journal is abstracted and indexed in the Social Sciences Citation Index. According to the Journal Citation Reports, the journal has a 2015 impact factor of 0.077, ranking it 40th out of 40 journals in the category "Women's Studies".

== Notable people ==
- Eva Rieger (born 1940), musicologist

== See also ==
- List of women's studies journals
