= Sabine Hark =

German sociologist

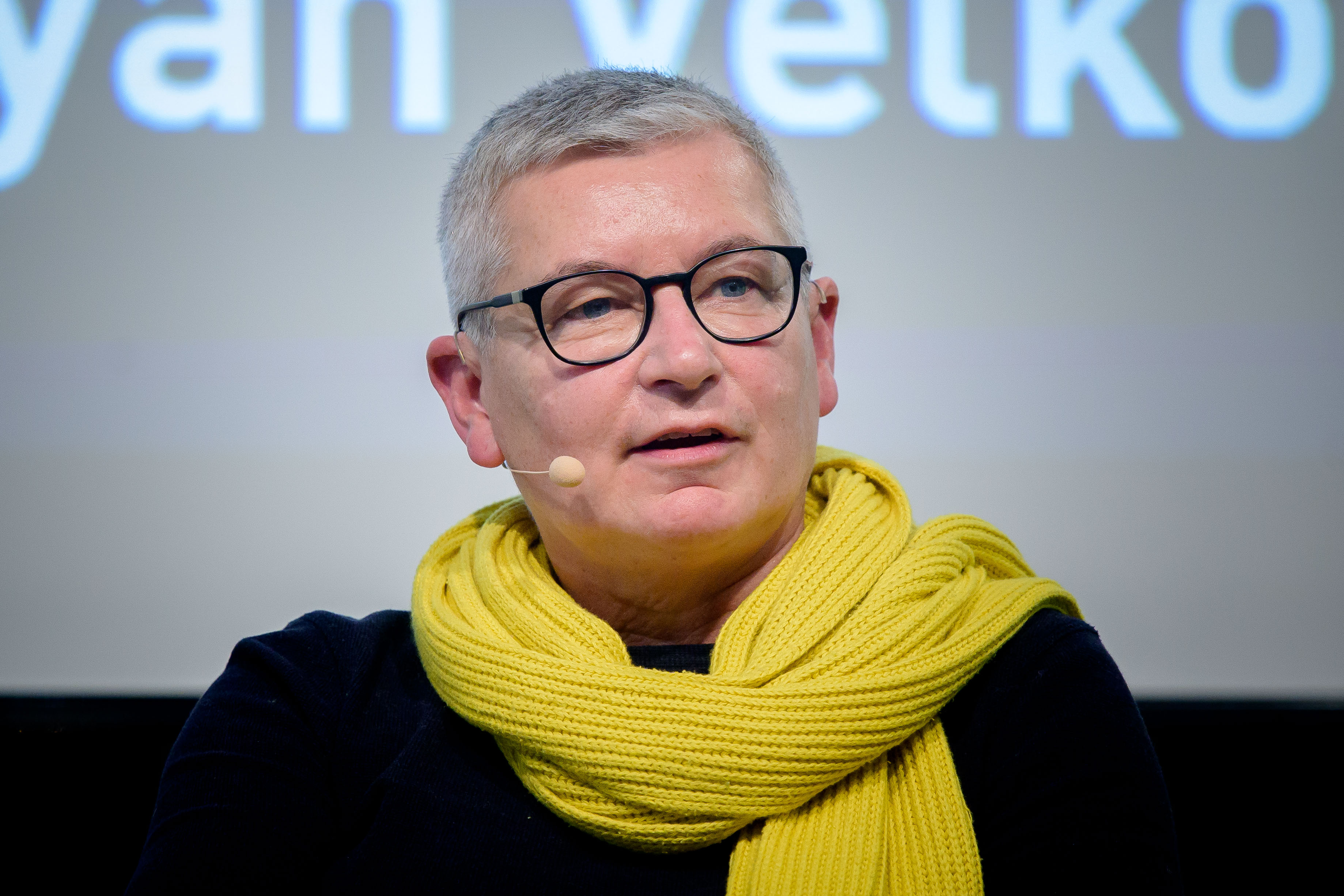
- Hark in 2021
- Born: August 7, 1962 (age 64); Nonnweiler, Germany
- Education: Free University of Berlin (PhD, 1995); Goethe University Frankfurt
- Scientific career
- Fields: Sociology of gender
- Workplaces: Technische Universität Berlin; University of Cologne

Sabine Hark (born 7 August 1962 in Nonnweiler) is a German feminist and sociologist, and sits on the editorial board of the journal Feministische Studien (Feminist Studies).

== Education ==
She studied sociology and political science at Mainz and Frankfurt am Main. She received her doctorate from the Free University of Berlin in 1995.

== Career ==
From 1997 until 2005 she has taught "sociology of gender" at the University of Potsdam. Since 2009 she has been director of "The center for interdisciplinary women's and gender's studies" at Technische Universität Berlin. A central part of her research is the deconstruction of lesbianism with respect to feminine identity.

== Selected bibliography ==
=== Books ===
- Hark, Sabine (2005). Dissidente partizipation: eine diskursgeschichte des feminismus (in German). Frankfurt am Main: Suhrkamp. ISBN 9783518293539.

Book review: Schlichter, Annette (December 2008). "Book review: Sabine Hark, Dissidente Partizipation: Eine Diskursgeschichte des Feminismus. Frankfurt am Main: Suhrkamp, 2005". Feminist Theory. 9 (3): 367–368. doi:10.1177/1464700108095859. S2CID 143676150.

=== Chapters in books ===
- Hark, Sabine; Villa, Paula–Irene (2010) [2009], "Ambivalenzen der Sichtbarkeit – Einleitung zur deutschen Ausgabe", in McRobbie, Angela (ed.), Top girls: Feminismus und der Aufstieg des neoliberalen Geschlechterregimes (in German), Wiesbaden: VS-Verl, pp. 7–16, ISBN 9783531162720.
  - From the original book in English: McRobbie, Angela (2009). The aftermath of feminism: gender, culture and social change. Los Angeles London: SAGE. ISBN 9780761970620.
- Butler, Judith; Hark, Sabine (2018), "Defamation and the Grammar of Harsh Words", in Sweetapple, Christopher (ed.), The Queer Intersectional in Contemporary Germany, Applied Sexology, Psychosocial-Verlag, pp. 203–207, ISBN 978383797444-7, ISSN 2367-2420

=== Journal articles ===
- Hark, Sabine (May 2009). "Was ist und wozu Kritik? Über Möglichkeiten und Grenzen feministischer Kritik heute". Feministische Studien (in German). 27 (1): 22–35. doi:10.1515/fs-2009-0104. S2CID 141045558.
- Hark, Sabine (May 2013). "Feministische Theorie heute: Die Kunst, ≥Nein≤ zu sagen". Feministische Studien (in German). 31 (1): 65–71. doi:10.1515/fs-2013-0113. S2CID 141587838.
