= Kane Race =

Australian sexuality researcher

Kane Race is an Australian professor of gender and cultural studies at the University of Sydney and is the author of a number of books including Pleasure Consuming Medicine: The queer politics of drugs (2009) and The Gay Science: Intimate experiments with HIV (2018).

He is internationally recognised for his contribution to the fields of HIV social research, critical drug studies as well as studies of digital sex.

== Education ==
In 1993 Race received a bachelor of art with honours at the University of Sydney which he followed with a bachelor of laws at the same university.

In 2004 he received his PhD from the University of New South Wales.

== Selected publications ==
- Race, Kane (2009). Pleasure consuming medicine : the queer politics of drugs. Duke University Press, Durham, NC.
- Hawkins, Gay & Potter, Emily & Race, Kane & Ebook Central (2015). Plastic Water : The Social and Material Life of Bottled Water. MIT Press, Cambridge, Mass.
- Race, Kane (2018). The gay science : intimate experiments with the problem of HIV. Routledge, an imprint of the Taylor & Francis Group, Abingdon, Oxon New York, NY.
